= Gurpreet =

Given name

Gurpreet is a Punjabi given name. Notable people with the name include:

- Gurpreet Kaur Bhatti (born Watford), British Sikh writer
- Gurpreet Singh Dhuri (born 1983), Indian sculptor
- Gurpreet Ghuggi (born 1971), Indian actor, comedian and politician
- Gurpreet Singh Lehal (born 1963), professor in the Computer Science Department, Punjabi University, Patiala
- Gurpreet Singh Sandhu (born 1992), Indian professional footballer
- Gurpreet Kaur Sapra, Indian Administrative Service officer, District Commissioner of Mohali, Ajitgarh
- Gurpreet Singh Shergill (born 1973), Indian musician
- Gurpreet Singh (actor), Indian TV and film actor
- Gurpreet Singh (artist) (born 1976), modern Indian painter
- Gurpreet Singh (kabaddi) (born 1979), representative for India in the sport of Kabaddi
- Gurpreet Singh (professor), associate professor at Kansas State University
- Gurpreet Singh (sport shooter) (born 1987), Indian sports shooter
- Gurpreet Singh Wander (born 1960), cardiologist and academic based in Ludiana, Punjab, India
