= Diwan Manna =

Indian artist and photographer (born 1958)

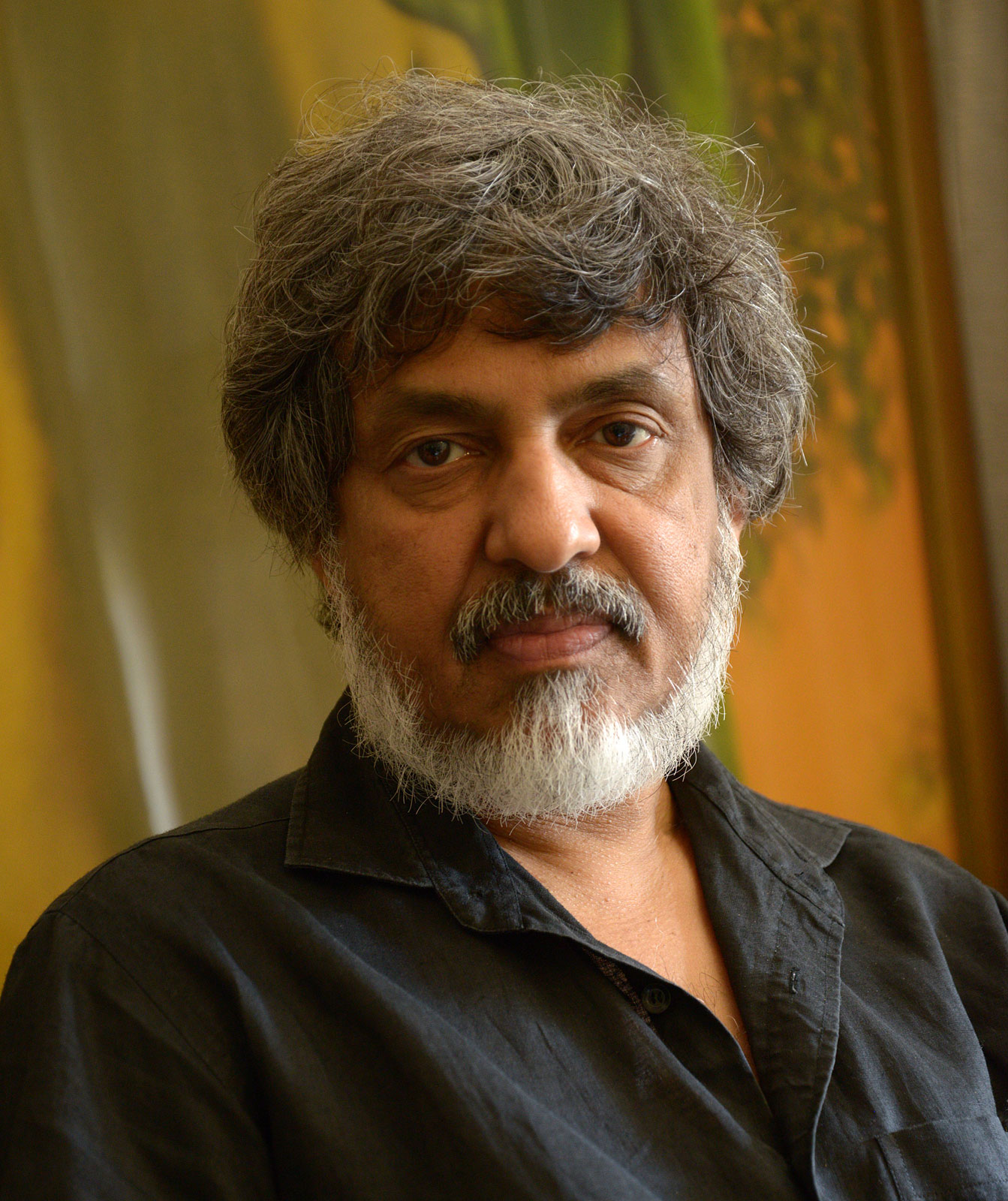
- Born: 1958 (age 67–68); Bareta, Punjab, India
- Education: Government College of Art, Chandigarh
- Known for: Conceptual photography
- Awards: National Academy Award (by Lalit Kala Akademi)
- Website: Official website

Diwan Manna (born 17 June 1958) is an Indian conceptual artist and photographer. He completed his study in graphic art and printmaking from the Government College of Art, Chandigarh in 1982. He exhibited in India, United Kingdom, Germany, France, Poland, and Italy. From 2014 to 2015 he served as the director of Triennale India, organised by Lalit Kala Akademi, National Academy of Art, Ministry of Culture, Govt of India. He served as the chairman of Chandigarh Lalit Kala Akademi, State Academy of Art, Department of Culture, Chandigarh Administration. Currently, he is serving as the president of Punjab Lalit Kala Akademi, State Academy of Art, Ministry of Culture, Government of Punjab, India.

He is a recipient of the National Academy Award by the Lalit Kala Akademi, New Delhi. Some of his artworks include Alienation (1980), Violence (1985), Waking the Dead (1996), Shores of the Unknown (2000), After the Turmoil (2003), and Master of Light, and Le Corbusier (2006).

== Early life ==
Manna was born in 1958, in Bareta, a town in Bathinda district (now Mansa district) of Punjab, India. He completed his matriculation from the Government High School, Bareta in 1975. In his early years, he studied fiction and poetry, and was active in sports, played leading role as an actor in theatre and local Ramlila, a popular theatrical folk form in India.

He studied printmaking at the Government College of Art, Chandigarh, India, from 1978 to 1982.

== Career ==
Manna has been practising art since 1980. In 2006, he was artist in residence at Firminy, Saint-Etienne, France, as a part of a cultural exchange program to photograph architecture of Le Corbusier.

On 17 June 2008, he was appointed the chairman of Chandigarh Lalit Kala Akademi, and held the position until 31 July 2015. From 2014 to 2015 he served as the director of Triennale India, organised by Lalit Kala Akademi India's National Academy of Arts, Ministry of Culture, Govt of India. Since 2016, he is the president of Punjab Lalit Kala Akademi.

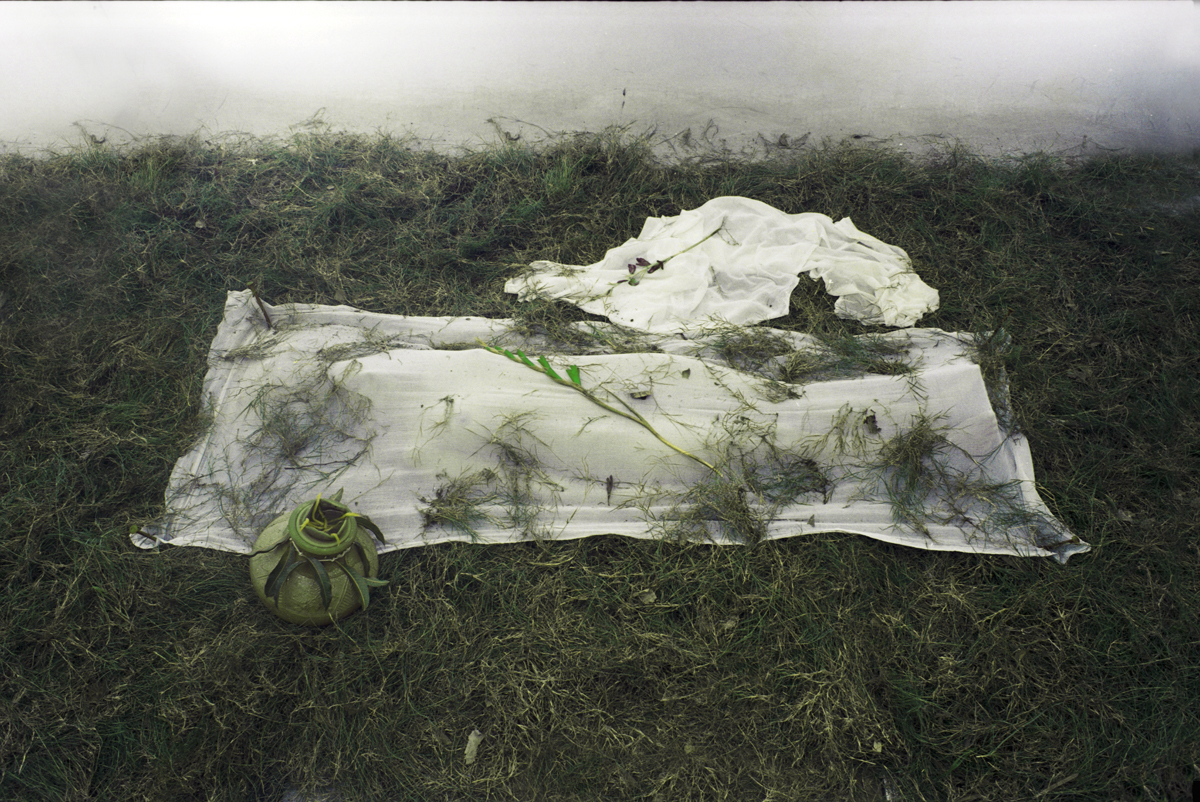
Shores of the Unknown New 13 by Conceptual Artist Diwan Manna

== Awards ==
He is a recipient of the National Academy Award by Lalit Kala Akademi. He first received the All India Fine Arts and Crafts Society award in 1995, and the second time in 1996.

== Artworks ==
Manna is one of the first artists from India to practice conceptual photography. His work combines images with objects, moving within a consciously chosen space in order to create a multimedia reality.

He is known for his work revolving around socio-cultural and socio-political concerns, in which he depicts the collapse of human sensitivities in the face of violence, turbulence, hypocrisy, alienation, dehumanization, war and death. According to the art historian Raffael Dedo Gadebusch in The Museum's Journal, Berlin, "...a rather thoughtfull laconic picture of the social reality emerges from Manna's compositions...".

By using existing icons and symbols of tradition and culture as a reference point, he creates visuals, which acquire a deeper meaning in the mind of the viewer, leading to a multitude of interpretations. His interest does not lie in creating pretty visuals but to transport the viewers from the image into their own perceived, imagined and lived experiences by inviting them to respond to these.

Diwan has pushed the boundaries of photography by developing a technique of combining painting, acting, and photography to narrate his personal impressions and experiences of the world in and around him. He creates a three-dimensional immersive environment in which there is a painting in the backdrop, actors whose bodies are painted and props created specifically around the themes he is working on (in the series Violence, Waking the Dead, Shores of the Unknown and After the Turmoil). This temporary installation of various elements is photographed on a transparency film which is further exposed in the darkroom on a normal photographic paper by controlling the rendition of images with the play of filters.

His artworks are not frozen mirror images of banal objects but there is certain remoteness from a routine visual experience. Camera for him is not merely a copying device to document the existing reality around him rather he constructs it in an effort to look beyond the obvious. He is often seen in the images (series - Waking the Dead, Shores of the Unknown and After the Turmoil), outside it, besides it, looking at it and looking from it thereby inhabiting space which is inner (mind), real (studio) and the social at the same time. His conceptual artworks began with the series Alienation in 1980 and continued with the series Violence, Waking the Dead, Shores of the Unknown, After the Turmoil, Master of Light-Le Corbusier over the next three decades. Through his works, Manna tries to express his concerns about the working class and the social inequality in Indian society.

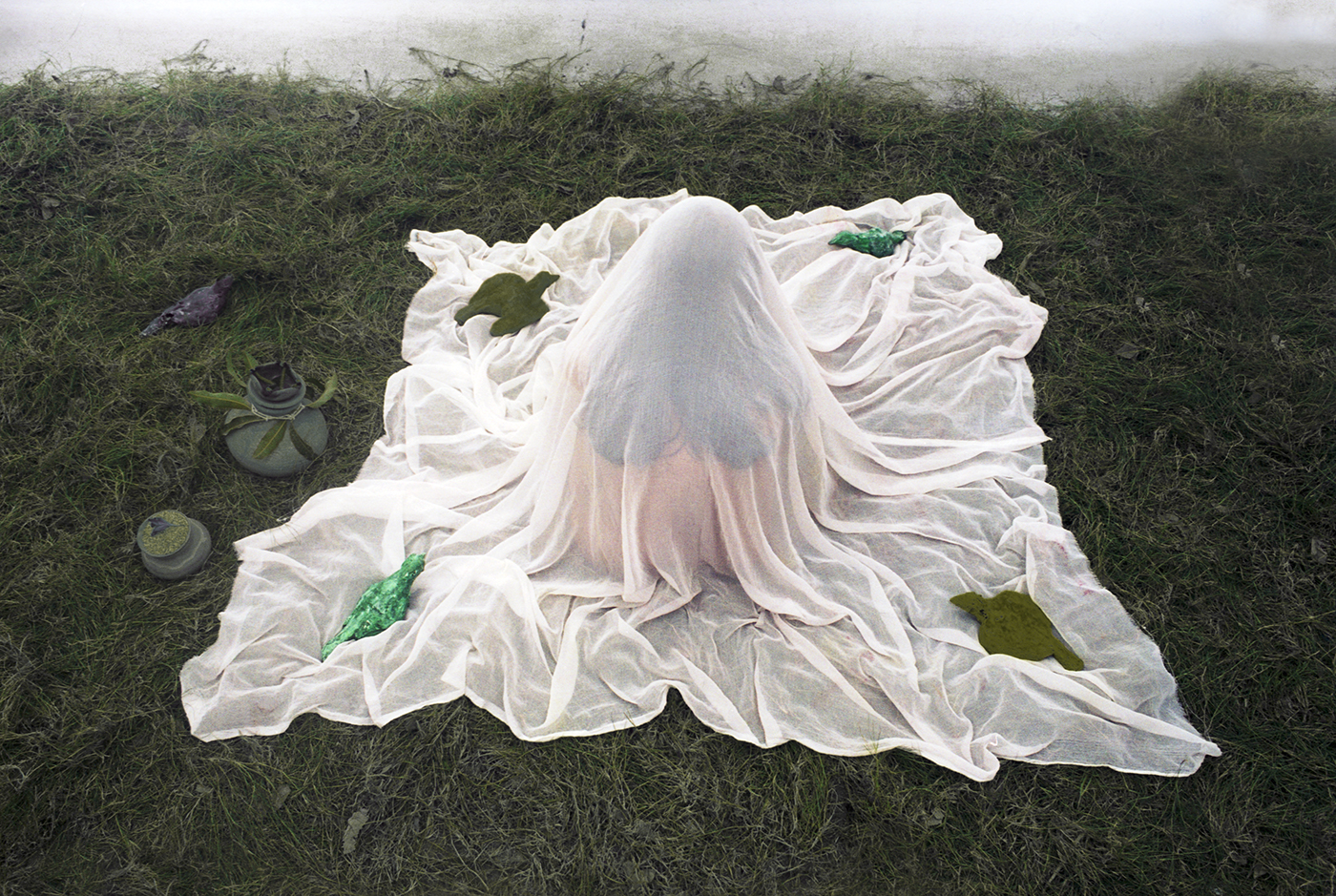
Shores of the Unknown 1 by Diwan Manna, conceptual artist

Some of his artworks include:

- Alienation (1980); 8 photographs created in 1980 revolving around the life of peons in the Government College of Art, Chandigarh, symbolizing increasing alienation in society.
- Dhaba (1987); photographs metaphorically representing darkness in the lives of workers in the local eateries.
- Waking the Dead (1996); series around various facets of death and life.
- Shores of the Unknown (2000); The unknown could be the expanse of private memory, the darkness of the collective unconscious, contemporary history, living environment and often the intersection of these spaces. An endless reflection of human predicaments characterizing the complex emotions that death evokes in us. These are the artworks in which Manna himself steps in as an actor to transcend and transform the scene.
- After the Turmoil (2003); based on the theme of optimism trying to come to terms with traumatic past and its newfound freedom.
- Violence (1985); work around insidious and unrecognized forms of degradation of a sense of life and honor within ourselves as well as in others.
- Master of Light, Le Corbusier (2006); images based on the modernist architect Le Corbusier's architectural creations. It is an attempt to create an imagery of lyricism, rhythm, and nuances of light, shape, form, volume, and colour based on his encounters with architectural spaces.
- Corridors of Power (2006); symbolic dimension of the administrative buildings in the Chandigarh Capitol Complex.

== Exhibitions ==
=== Individual ===
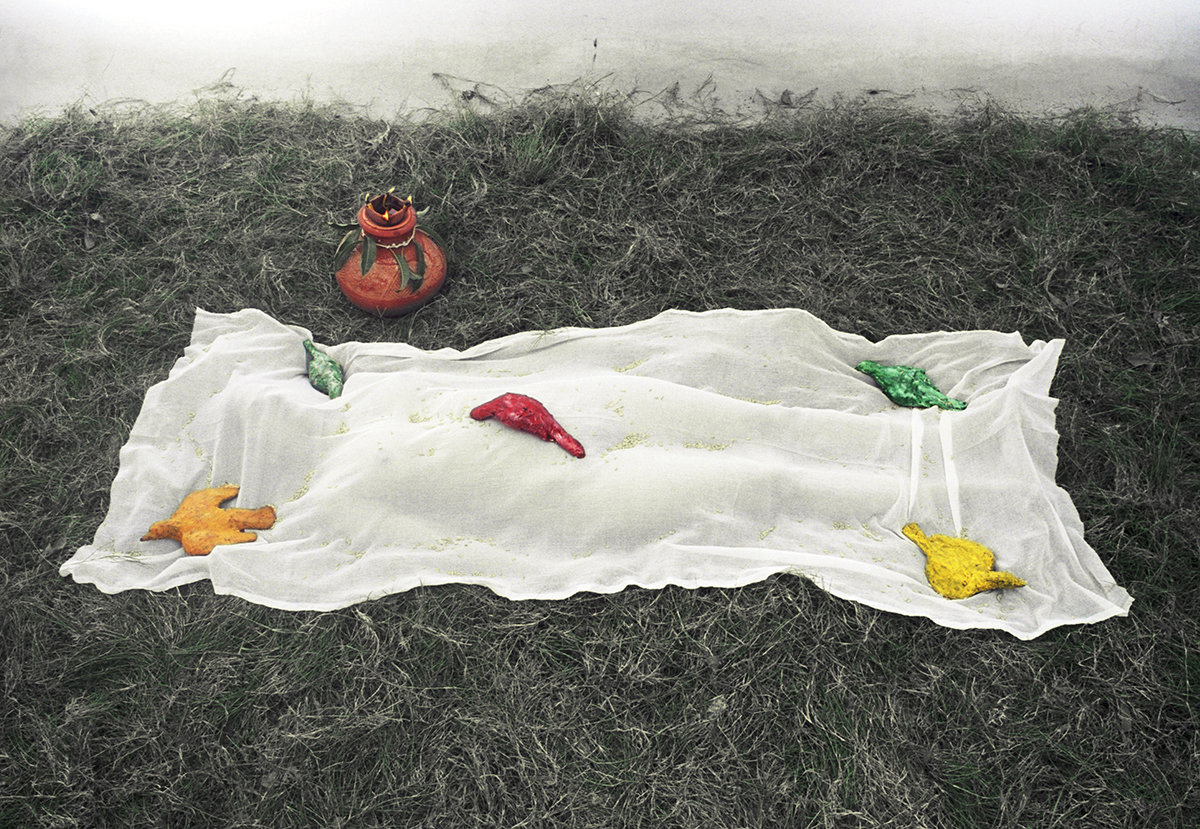
Shores of the Unknown 28 by Diwan Manna, conceptual artist

His individual exhibitions include:

- 2006: Ages of Separation curated by Alka Pande at India Habitat Centre
- 2003: After The Turmoil at International Art Centre, Paszkowka Palace, Kraków, Poland.
- 2001: Window on Time at Galerie Bateau Lavoir, Paris, France.
- 2000: Wheel of Time at Alliance Francaise de Chandigarh, India
- 2000: Alienation, Violence, Dhaba, Goat's Eye and Shores of the Unknown at Museum of Asian Art, Berlin, Germany
- 2000: Shores of the Unknown at Galerie Bellevue, Berlin, Germany
- 1999: Rooh Punjab Di curated by Alka Pande at Sector 17, Chandigarh, India
- 1997: Waking the Dead at Rowley's Museum, Shrewsbury, UK

=== Group exhibitions ===
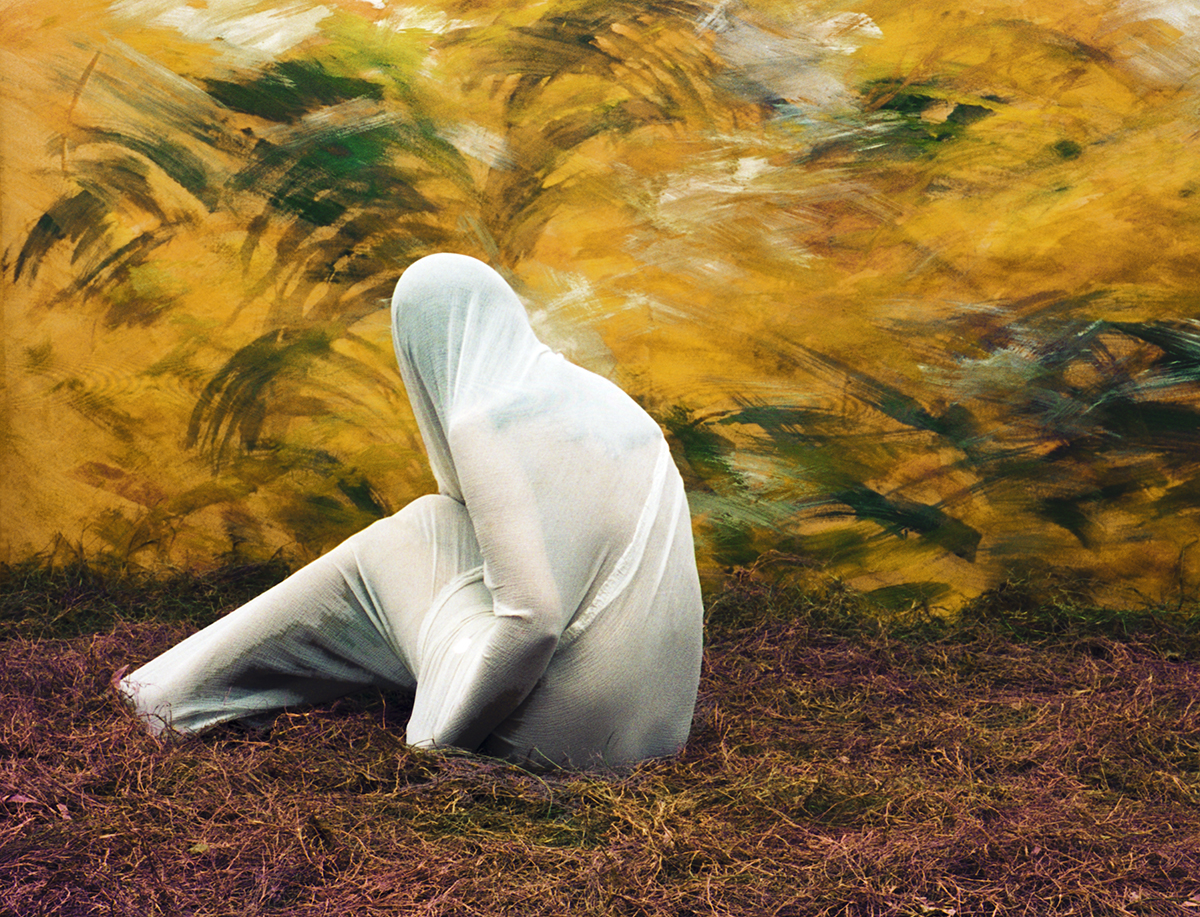
Shores of the Unknown 5 by Diwan Manna, conceptual artist

His work has been exhibited in some group exhibitions, including:

- 2016: Bodhgaya Biennale
- 2016: Le Corbusier - Mastering the Image in India, in collaboration with Museum of Fine Arts, La-Chaux-de-Fonds, Switzerland, and Fondation Le Corbusier, France, at NGMA, Bangalore, at Embassy of Switzerland in Nov 2015 and at Govt. Museum & Art Gallery, Chandigarh, October 2015, curated by Sphie Vantieghem
- 2011: Articulate 2011 - An Exhibition of Contemporary photography- Saffron Art and Pratham, UK, Bond Street, London, UK
- 2011: 150 Years of Income Tax in India- Lalit Kala Akademi Galleries, New Delhi, Chandigarh, Lucknow, and Jaipur.
- 2009: The Wonder that is India- A Visual Map, group exhibition of 8 Photographers, curated by Alka Pande, collateral event India Art Summit, Instituto Cervantes Nueva, Delhi.
- 2008: Click! Contemporary Photography in India, curated by Suneil Gupta and Radhika Singh, at Vadehra Art Gallery in collaboration with Photomedia, New Delhi, India and Grosvenor Gallery, London
- 2007–2008: Regards Croises Franco - Indien (Indo - French Glances) Firminy-Chandigarh, Le Corbusier, by Diwan Manna and Michel Dieudonne, curated by Martine Dancer, at Alliance Francaise de Chandigarh, Apparao Gallery Chennai, Gallery Romaine Rolland, Alliance Francaise de Delhi, April, Alliance Francaise Trivandrum, Alliance Francaise Kolkata, Alliance Francaise, Bangalore
- 2007: Brasilia-Chandigarh-Le Havre, Portraits de Villes, Musee Malraux, curated by Annette Haudiquet, Le Havre, France
- 2006–2007: Regards Croises Franco - Indien (Indo - French Glances) Firminy-Chandigarh, Le Corbusier, by Diwan Manna and Michel Dieudonne, curated by Martine Dancer at Unite de la Habitation, Firminy, St-Etienne, France
- 2006–2007: Lille 2007, Le Corbusier a Chandigarh 1951–2006, by Diwan Manna, Stephane Couturier, and Lucien Harve, curated by Yannick Courbes, Musee des Beaux-Arts, Tourcoing, Lille, France
- 2005: Decisive Moment, New Delhi, India
- 2004: Singular Identities, curated by Alka Pande, at India Habitat Center
- 2000: Group show of five artists at Alliance Francaise, Chandigarh, India
- 1997: Five Artists from Punjab, Galleries of English Bridge Workshop, Abbey Foregate, Shrewsbury, UK
- 1997: Yesterday, Today and Tomorrow, Government Museum and Art Gallery, Chandigarh, India
- 1996: 3rd All India Photography Exhibition, All India Fine Arts and Crafts Society, New Delhi and Chandigarh, India
- 1996: National Exhibition of Photography, Lalit Kala Akademi, Delhi, India
- 1995: 2nd All India Photography Exhibition, All India Fine Arts and Crafts Society, New Delhi and Chandigarh, India
- 1995: Project Punjab at National Gallery of Modern Art, New Delhi, Mumbai, Chandigarh, India and UK
- 1993: South Asian Visual Arts Festival, Wolverhampton Art Gallery, UK
- 1988: International Exhibition of Graphic Art & Photography, All India Fine Arts and Crafts Society, New Delhi, India
- 1982: National Exhibition of Art, Lalit Kala Akademi, Delhi, India
