= D. S. Kapoor =

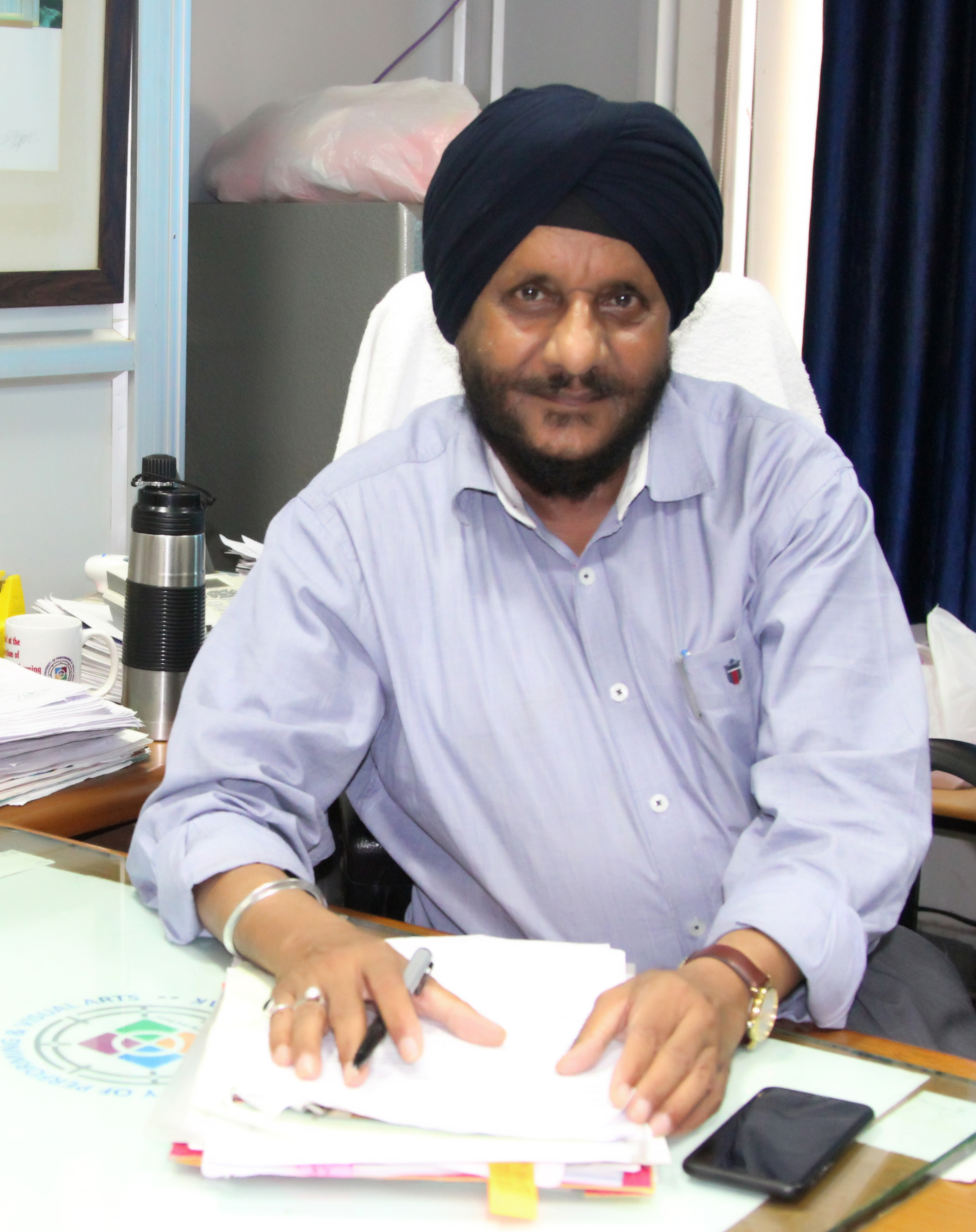
- Kapoor in 2016

Officer on Special Duty, National Institute of Design, Kurukshetra
- Incumbent
- Assumed office 2016

Principal, Government College of Arts, Chandigarh
- In office 2009–2012

Dean, Pandit Lakhmi Chand State University of Performing and Visual Arts
- In office 2012–2016

Personal details
- Born: 1954 (age 71–72) Gurugram, Haryana, India
- Education: Government College of Arts
- Website: aestheticvision.in

D. S. Kapoor (born 1954) is an Indian art historian and educator. He completed a bachelor of arts degree at Government College of Arts, Chandigarh (GCA) and began a career as a commercial artist. Later, he moved to art education, teaching at St. John's School. In 1990, he became a faculty member of the GCA, and served as the acting principal of the college from 2009 to 2012. After his retirement, he was appointed the dean of the Pandit Lakhmi Chand State University of Performing and Visual Arts, and then as an Officer on Special Duty at the National Institute of Design, Kurukshetra.

Kapoor designed a replica of the Eiffel Tower in Chandigarh, to serve as an entrance to the annual Chandigarh Carnival. He authored a coffee table book on the GCA's 140-year history titled History and Heritage, Government College of Art (INDIA), which was released in 2018.

== Early life and education ==
Kapoor was born in 1954 in Gurgaon, Haryana. His father, Sujan Singh, was a faculty member at the Government College of Arts (GCA), Chandigarh. Kapoor completed his primary education at the Lady Irwin School, Shimla, and his secondary education at the Government Senior Secondary School. Though his father wanted him to pursue a career in architecture, Kapoor was interested in the arts. He was accepted into the GCA and graduated from the college with a national diploma degree in 1978. He later pursued a postgraduate diploma in public relations and advertising at the Dayanand College of Communication and Management.

== Career ==
Kapoor's first job was as an artist at the Central Government's Tractor Training Centre, where he painted signboards. He quit after a month and joined St. John's School as an art teacher. In 1982, he moved to the Department of Industries & Commerce, Haryana, as a commercial artist. He was instrumental in designing the industrial journal, Udyog Yog. In 1988, he designed a postage stamp to commemorate the Silver Jubilee of the Bhakra Dam.

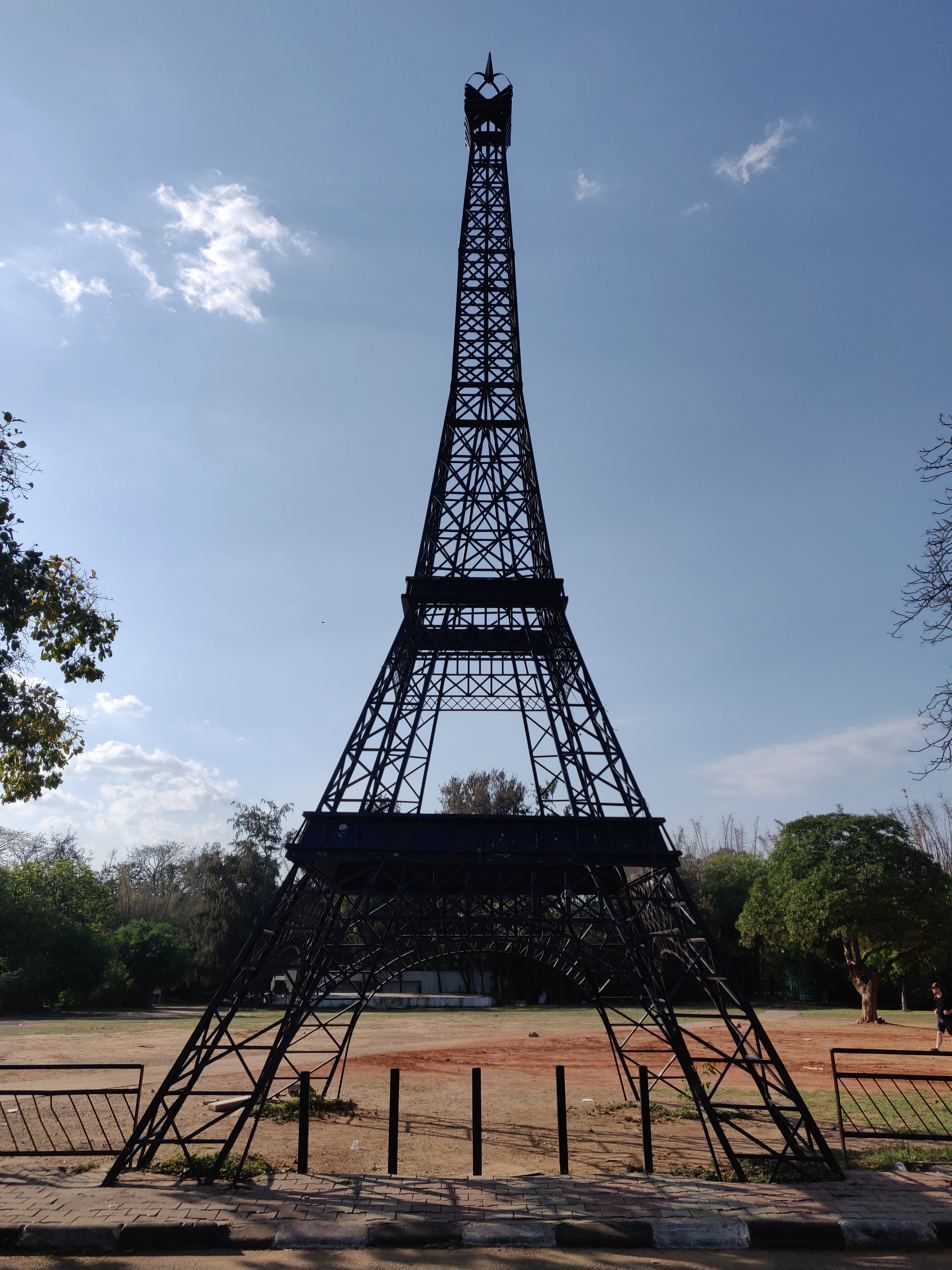
Replica of the Eiffel Tower in Chandigarh

In 1990, he joined the GCA, as a teacher. His father Sujan Singh, and his grandfather Sunder Singh, also held various positions at the college making him the third generation to teach there. During his years at the college, he introduced computer graphics as a subject and also founded a registered organisation for the college's alumni, Kala Maitri. In 2009, he was nominated to be the principal. During his tenure the college celebrated its diamond jubilee. He established a sculpture park on the college campus, which was named after the sculptor Dhanraj Bhagat. On 15 October 2010, the park was inaugurated by Ram Niwas, then Chief Secretary of Chandigarh.

Kapoor designed a replica of the Eiffel Tower in Chandigarh, which was installed in the Leisure Valley to serve as an entrance to the annual Chandigarh Carnival. He also designed murals for the Delhi Metro. In 2011, he curated an exhibition on the works on Sunirmal Chatterjee, titled Retrospective of Sunirmal Chatterjee. After his retirement as principal of the GCA in 2012, he was appointed dean of the Pandit Lakhmi Chand State University of Performing and Visual Arts, Rohtak, a position he held until 2016. In the same year, he assumed the office of Officer on Special Duty at National Institute of Design, Kurukshetra.

In 2014, with the slogan, Jai Jawan Jai Kisan (English: Hail the Soldier, Hail the Farmer), Kapoor launched a national campaign called Jai Kalakar (English: Hail the Artist). As of March 2019, he continues to serve as the president of Kala Maitri, the GCA alumni association, which he founded, and is an honorary member of the Chandigarh Lalit Kala Academy.

== History and Heritage (book) ==
Kapoor authored a coffee table book on the history of GCA, titled History and Heritage, Government College of Art (INDIA). The book outlines the College's 140 year history from its establishment as the Mayo School of Art in 1875 in Lahore (now in Pakistan). Kapoor began compiling the book in 2009. It was released in March 2018 at a book launch ceremony attended by the Governor of Haryana, Kaptan Singh Solanki, the Vice Chancellor of Punjab University, Arun Kumar Grover, and the former principal of the GCA, Prem Singh.

== Awards and honours ==
- 2002, 2005, 2008 – Award by Governor of Punjab-cum-administrators Chandigarh, on Independence Day and Republic Day
- 2004 – Chandigarh Lalit Kala Akademi award
- 2006 – First Friday Forum Prestigious Award for Creative Excellence
- 2008 – Special Award of Honour by the Vice Chancellor of Panjab University during World Punjabi Conference
- Tata Steel Selenium Award for Innovative Design

== See also ==
- Mayo School of Arts, Lahore
- The 1947 Partition Archive
- National College of Arts
