= Landless (film) =

- Film poster
- Directed by: Randeep Maddoke
- Written by: Randeep Maddoke
- Produced by: Zindabad Trust
- Cinematography: Randeep Maddoke
- Edited by: Sahib Iqbal Singh
- Music by: Asheesh Pandya
- Release date: 2018
- Running time: 70 minutes
- Country: India
- Language: Punjabi

Landless is a 2018 Punjabi documentary film by Randeep Maddoke, a photographer and photojournalist from Punjab, India. This documentary film accounts the problems faced by Dalits and caste-based discrimination in their daily life. It recounts the story of the people who have faced abomination like social boycott, communal attacks by Jatts (upper caste) in Punjab. The project records the recent disturbances in the state.

== Background ==
The documentary analysis about the caste and class system in Punjab, India. According to the ancient Hindu law book Manusmriti, society is divided into four Varnas; Brahmins, Kshatriyas, Vaishyas and Shudras and there are people who don't belongs to these Varnas, they known as Avarnas (Untouchables). They are considered as sub-humans and are set to do the jobs considered foul and disregarded in a society, like, manual scavenging. They were not allowed get education, to enter the religious buildings, and they were not permitted to use the public spaces as Varnas. The documentary talks about Punjab, where the caste-dynamics is unlike the rest of India due to the establishment of Sikh religion in this state in the mid-1500s. The Sikh religion had no space for caste-discrimination in theory, the Gurus preached egalitarianism across all the classes and caste groups and sought for the upliftment of the classes and groups marginalised by Hinduism. This attracted the disregarded groups to Sikhism.
