= Dhuri (disambiguation) =

Dhuri may refer to:

- Dhuri a city in India
- Bal Dhuri, Indian actor
- Gurpreet Singh Dhuri (born 1983), Indian sculptor
