= Randeep =

Randeep is a name. People with the name include:

- Randeep Hooda
- Randeep Surjewala
- Randeep Rai
- Randeep Sarai
- Randeep Guleria
- Randeep Maddoke
- Randeep Singh Nabha
