= Government College of Art, Chandigarh =

Government College of Arts, Chandigarh
- Former name: 1875 (as Mayo College of Arts)
- Motto in English: Excellence in work is art.
- Type: Public art school
- Established: 1951; 75 years ago in Shimla (Post-independence)
- Founder: S. L. Prashar
- Affiliations: Panjab University; AICTE
- Principal: Dr. Alka Jain
- Location: Chandigarh, India; 30.44°N 76.47°W
- Campus: Urban
- Language: Punjabi, Hindi, English
- Website: www.gcart.edu.in

The Government College of Arts, Chandigarh is an art institute in Chandigarh, India. Established in 1951 by SL Prashar, it offers professional education in art to students from over 68 years. This institute is one among the first three art institutions of India. It has a history of almost 132 years, initially, it was initially established as Mayo School of Industrial art in 1875 for purpose to provide industrial drawing as the world was on industrial revolution. John Lockwood Kipling was appointed as the first principal of the institution, which is now active as National College of Arts in Lahore. It came up on 16 August 1951 as splinter Mayo School of Arts, Lahore in Pakistan after Partition of India. In 1951 it was first established as Government School of Art and craft at Shimla, the capital of Punjab and subsequently Govt. College of art and craft, Chandigarh. On re-organization of Punjab, the control came under Chandigarh Administration. This institution is situated in Sector 10 C, adjoining the Government Museum and Art Gallery, Chandigarh.

== History ==
Government College of Art, Chandigarh the Institution is recognised as Mayo School's post-colonial cousins in India. Primarily it was set up by the British on the name of Mayo School of Art, at Lahore (now in Pakistan) in the year 1875. After the partition of the country, it was re-organized upon the prototype of Mayo School, as Government school of art and craft, at Shimla on 16 August 1951. The syllabus was modelled on the pattern of the Lahore school. Initially, it was put under the administrative control of Director of Industries and Industrial Training, Punjab.

In 1962, when Chandigarh came up as the new Capital of Punjab, the school of Art was shifted to its current location. Adjoining is the Government Museum and Art Gallery Chandigarh. The campus has been designed as a composite Cultural Complex by the French-Swiss architect Le Corbusier. The first principal and founder of this college in Chandigarh was S. L. Prashar.

== Campus ==
Dhanraj Bhagat Sculpture park in the College campus, was set up on 15 October 2010, that became an open-air workshop for the students to work in open classroom and an option to recover from the constraint of time and space of regular college routine, as a result, it came up with a permanent exhibition of artworks in the institution. S L Prashar Art Gallery was inaugurated on 16 June 2012, and the first exhibition with old photographs dating back to 1951 on diamond jubilee of the institution.

== Courses ==
Government College of Art, Chandigarh offers a graduate and a postgraduate degree in four main branches, namely, Painting, Sculpture, Print Making and Applied Art. Since the year 2002, The college has instituted another full-time diploma course of 4 years duration and special diploma course of 2 years duration since 2012 for deaf and Mute/Mentally Challenged students in Fine Arts (all the four disciplines)

== Notable alumni ==
- Satish Gujral
- Sohan Qadri
- Avtarjeet Singh Dhanjal
- Shiv Singh
- Sidharth (artist)
- Diwan Manna
- Thukral & Tagra
- Vibha Galhotra
- D. S. Kapoor
- R. M. Singh
- Gurpreet Singh Dhuri
- Manjot Kaur
- Randeep Maddoke
- DrJogender Pal Singh
