= Manjot Kaur =

Indian artist (born 1989)

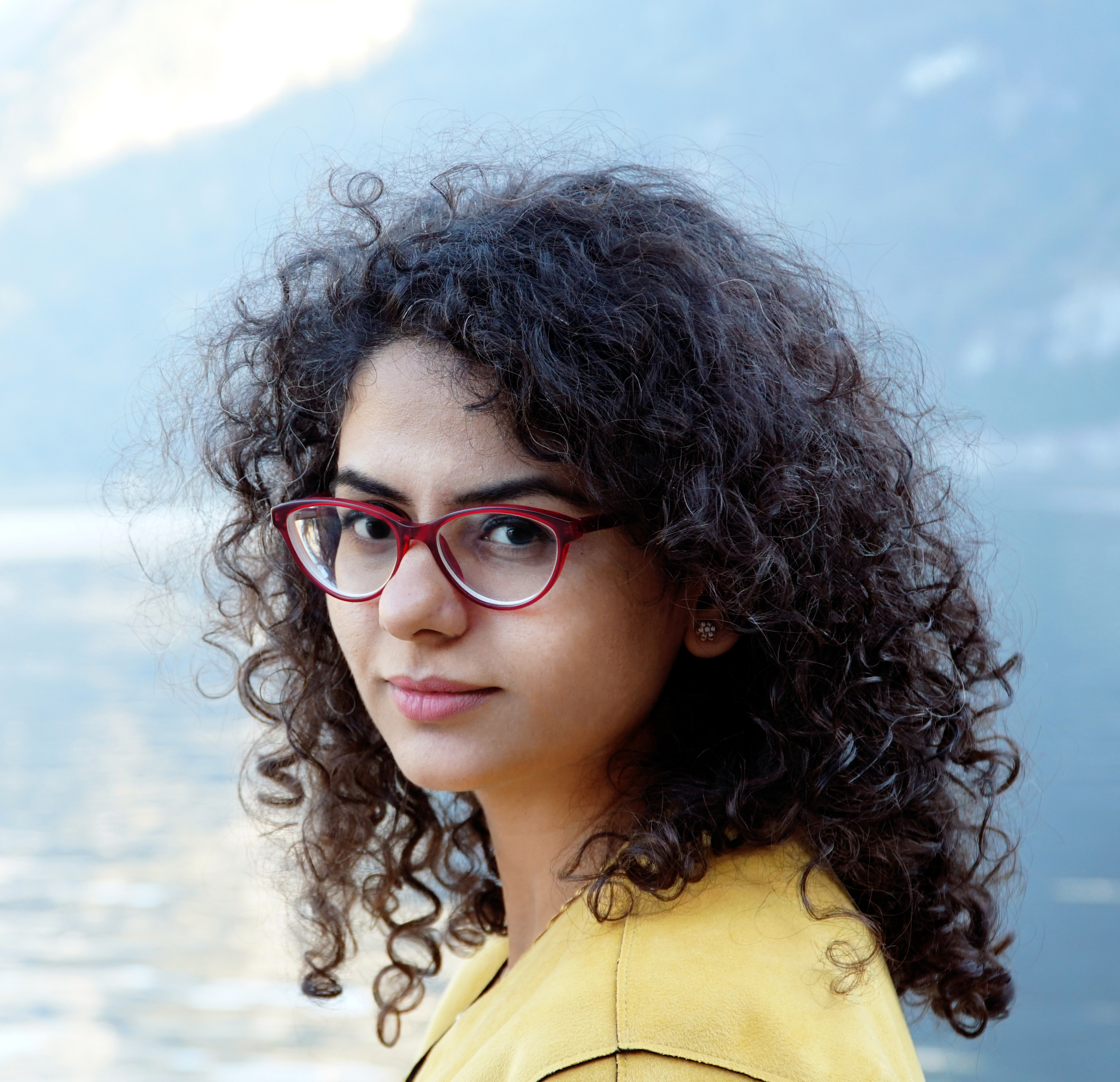
- Kaur in August 2018
- Born: 1989 (age 36–37); Ludhiana, Punjab, India
- Occupation: Visual artist
- Website: www.kaurmanjot.com

Manjot Kaur (born 1989) is a contemporary Indian artist. She is currently an artist-in-residence at International Studio & Curatorial Program. She was a visiting artist fellow at the Lakshmi Mittal and Family South Asia Institute of Harvard University in 2023. She lives and works between Vancouver and Chandigarh.

== About ==
Kaur studying painting and received a BFA and MFA (University Gold Medal) from Government College of Arts, Chandigarh, in 2010 and 2012 respectively.

== Practice ==
Manjot Kaur’s paintings, animations, and immersive interactive installations intersect the boundaries of speculative fiction, archetypal allegories, and precarious ecologies to push back against the centering of human as a protagonist. Her works explore the sovereignty of women’s bodies and ecolog. She cross-pollinates ancient mythologies with fiction to reflect on the relationship between humans and more than humans. Her paintings open up possibilities for a post-queer and post-human world where beings move towards an uncanny kind of becoming. While inventing fiction from mythology and the natural world, offers her powerful tools to demodernize the existing dualist constructs of nature and culture, raising questions concerning power and agency of both women and ecology. Her work propose an alternative meaning of motherhood and proposes narratives from a multi-species future.

== Biography ==
Manjot was a Visiting Artist Fellow at "The Lakshmi Mittal and Family South Asia Institute" at Harvard University, Cambridge, USA in March and April 2023. In the past, she has received "Generator Art Production Fund" grant from Experimenter Gallery, India in 2022. She has been an artist in residence at Jan van Eyck Academie, Maastricht, Netherlands (2020–21), 1 Shanthiroad, Bangalore, (2019), Unidee, Cittadellarte Fondazione Pistoletto, Italy (2018) funded by Inlaks Shivdasani Foundation, India and Peers - Khoj International Artists' Association, New Delhi, (2018) and Museo Casa Masaccio Centro per l’Arte Contemporanea, San Giovanni Valdarno (Italy) – a cross-institutional program with Clark House Initiative, Mumbai, India, 2018.

Her recent participations include "The Land Sings Back", The Drawing Room, London (2025) curated by Natasha Ginwala, "India Art Fair", Gallery Latitude 28, New Delhi (2023), "Where Shall We Plant The Placenta," A Tale of A Tub, Rotterdam (2022); "Non- Fungible Speculations," Nature Morte, New Delhi (2022); "The World Awaits You Like a Garden," with curatorial note by Prof Sugata Ray at Gallery Latitude 28, New Delhi (2022); "Hurting and Healing – Let’s Imagine a Different Heritage," curated by Charles Esche at Tensta Konsthall, Stockholm (2022); "The Pool of Memories," Surrey Art Gallery, British Columbia, Canada (2022); "Garden State," curated by Fadwa Namna at Garage Rotterdam, Rotterdam (2021), among others.

She has received State Award, Punjab Lalit Kala Akademi, Chandigarh, 2018; Sohan Qadri Fellowship, Chandigarh Lalit Kala Akademi, Chandigarh, 2017; State Award, Chandigarh Lalit Kala Akademi, Chandigarh, in 2017 and 2012, and Scholarship to Young Artists, Chandigarh Lalit Kala Akademi, in 2011. She was chosen by Hindustan Times as one of the Top 30-under-30 young achievers in 2017. She has received professional Category Annual Award, Punjab Lalit Kala Akademi (State Academy of Art), Chandigarh, India, 2018; Sohan Qadri Fellowship, Chandigarh Lalit Kala Akademi (State Academy of Art), Chandigarh, India 2017; Professional and Student Category Annual Award, Chandigarh Lalit Kala Akademi (State Academy of Art), Chandigarh, India, 2017 and 2012, respectively and Scholarship to Young Artists, Chandigarh Lalit Kala Akademi (State Academy of Art), Chandigarh, India in 2011. She was chosen by Hindustan Times as one of the Top 30 under 30 young achievers in 2017.

Her works are in the collection of Museo Casa Masaccio Centro per l’Arte Contemporanea, San Giovanni Valdarno (Italy), Govt. Museum and Art Gallery, Chandigarh, India, Personal collection Prof. B. N. Goswamy, India and Tellusart, Sweden.
