= Nand Singh =

Indian recipient of the Victoria Cross (1914-1947)

Jemadar Nand Singh VC, MVC
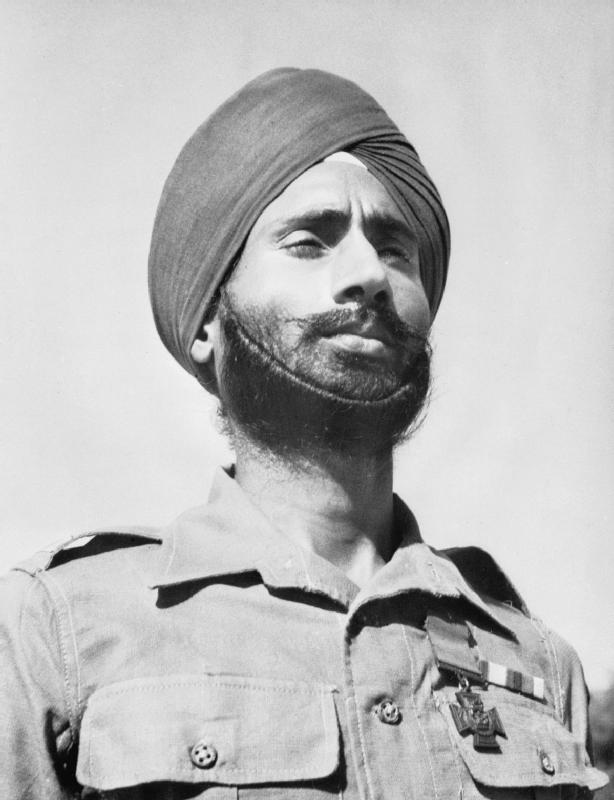
- Nand Singh in 1944
- Born: 24 September 1914; Bahadurpur (Mansa, Punjab, India)
- Died: 12 December 1947 (aged 33); Uri, Kashmir
- Military career
- Allegiance: British India; India
- Branch: British Indian Army; Indian Army
- Service years: 1933 - 1947
- Rank: Acting Naik (British Indian Army); Jemadar (Indian Army)
- Units: 1/11th Sikh Regiment; 1 Sikh
- Conflicts: World War II; Burma campaign; Indo-Pakistani War of 1947
- Awards: Victoria Cross; Maha Vir Chakra

Jemadar Nand Singh, VC, MVC (24 September 1914 – 12 December 1947) was an Indian recipient of the Victoria Cross, the highest and most prestigious award for gallantry in the face of the enemy that can be awarded to British and Commonwealth forces and he was posthumously awarded the Maha Vir Chakra, the second-highest Indian decoration for battlefield gallantry. This makes Nand Singh unique in the annals of VC winners

== Military career ==
Nand Singh joined the 1st Battalion, 11th Sikh Regiment, Indian Army, in March 1933 and took part in the Waziristan campaign of 1936–37. He was promoted lance naik in September 1942.

=== World War II ===
He was 29 years old, and an Acting Naik in the 1/11th Sikh Regiment, in the Indian Army during World War II when the following deed took place for which he was awarded the VC.

On 11/12 March 1944 on the Maungdaw-Buthidaung Road, Burma (now Myanmar), Naik Nand Singh, commanding a leading section of the attack, was ordered to recapture a position gained by the enemy. He led his section up a very steep knife-edged ridge under very heavy machine-gun and rifle fire and although wounded in the thigh, captured the first trench. He then crawled forward alone and, wounded again in the face and shoulder, nevertheless captured the second and third trenches.

=== Indo-Pakistan War ===
He later achieved the rank of Jemadar in the post-independence Indian Army, and his unit 1 Sikh was the first to be involved in the Jammu & Kashmir Operations or Indo-Pakistani War of 1947 which began in October 1947 as Indian troops went into action to repel a planned invasion of Jammu & Kashmir by raiders from Pakistan.

On 12 December 1947 Nand Singh led his platoon of D Coy in a desperate but successful attack to extricate his battalion from an ambush in the hills SE of Uri in Kashmir. He was mortally injured by a close-quarters machine-gun burst, and posthumously awarded the Maha Vir Chakra (MVC), the second-highest Indian decoration for battlefield gallantry. This makes Nand Singh unique in the annals of VC winners.

The Pakistanis recognised Jemadar Nand Singh because of his VC ribbon. His body was taken to Muzaffarabad where it was tied spreadeagled on a truck and paraded through the city with a loudspeaker proclaiming that this would be the fate of every Indian VC. The soldier's body was later thrown into a garbage dump, and was never recovered.

== Citations ==
=== Victoria Cross ===
The Victoria Cross citation reads as follows:

War Office, 6th June, 1944.

The KING has been graciously pleased to approve the award of the VICTORIA CROSS to: —

No. 13068 Sepoy (acting Naik) Nand Singh, 11th Sikh Regiment, Indian Army. In Burma on the night of the 11th/12th March, 1944, a Japanese platoon about 40 strong with Medium and Light Machine-Guns and a Grenade Discharger infiltrated into the Battalion position covering the main Maungdaw-Buthidaung road and occupied a dominating position where they dug foxholes and underground trenches on the precipitous sides of the hill.

Naik Nand Singh commanded the leading section of the platoon which was ordered to recapture the position at all costs. He led his section up a very steep knife-edged ridge under heavy machine-gun and rifle fire. Although wounded in the thigh he rushed ahead of his section and took the first enemy trench with the bayonet by himself. He then crawled forward alone under heavy fire and though wounded again in the face and shoulder by a grenade which burst one yard in front of him, took the second trench at the point of the bayonet.

A short time later when all his section had been either killed or wounded, Naik Nand Singh dragged himself out of the trench and captured a third trench, killing all the occupants with his bayonet.

Due to the capture of these three trenches the remainder of the platoon were able to seize the top of the hill and deal with the enemy. Naik Nand Singh personally killed seven of the enemy and owing to his determination, outstanding dash and magnificent courage, the important position was won back from the enemy

=== Maha Vir Chakra ===
The citation for the Maha Vir Chakra reads as follows:

Gazette Notification: 2 Pres 50, 26.1.50,

Operation: 1947 Indo Pak Kashmir War, Date of Award: 12 Dec 1947,

Citation:
On 12 December 1947, one Sikh was out on a fighting patrol at Uri against the tribesmen in Kashmir State. The enemy, who was occupying previously prepared bunker position, opened fire on the leading company of the battalion killing 10 men on the spot and wounding another 15. These 15 wounded soldiers were lying within 10 yards of enemy position. The enemy was attempting, under very heavy covering fire, to pull in these casualties and capture their arms and was at the same time carrying out an encircling movement round this position. Counter-attacks by the company on these bunkers had failed, resulting in even heavier casualties. Another company was then ordered to attack from the left flank. Jemadar Nand Singh, VC, was commanding one of its forward platoons.

His platoon went into attack like a band of Trojans with himself to the fore. The fire was intense and his men were falling left and right of him. Yet he pressed on. His men followed him shouting cries of "Sat Sri Akal" and closed in on the enemy. He carried on. Fierce hand to-hand fighting ensued. Jemadar Nand Singh was the first to draw blood with his bayonet. Although wounded, he killed five of the enemy. By this fine example, his men were inspired to frenzy and fought like fiends, bayoneting right and left. The enemy broke and fled, but very few of them could escape.

This brave VCO had captured his objective, but as he stood there on top of the bunker, a burst of enemy LMG hit him in the chest and killed him on the spot. However, his mission had been completed. The valour, leadership and selfless devotion to duty displayed by this son of India in this little action was something that cannot be described, much less matched.

He was VC of the last war and had more than lived up to the reputation of one.

== Legacy ==
Nand Singh was from the village of Bahadurpur now in Mansa district, Punjab. The nearest town is Bareta, where a local bus stand is named as Shaheed Nand Singh Viktoria Bus Stand. A statue in Bathinda (locally known as Fauji Chowk) stands as a memorial. Nand Singh bridge in Uri, Jammu and Kashmir was named in his honour.

His name appears on the Memorial Gates in Hyde Park London, along with other Indian Army VC winners.
