= Vibha Galhotra =

Indian artist (born 1978)

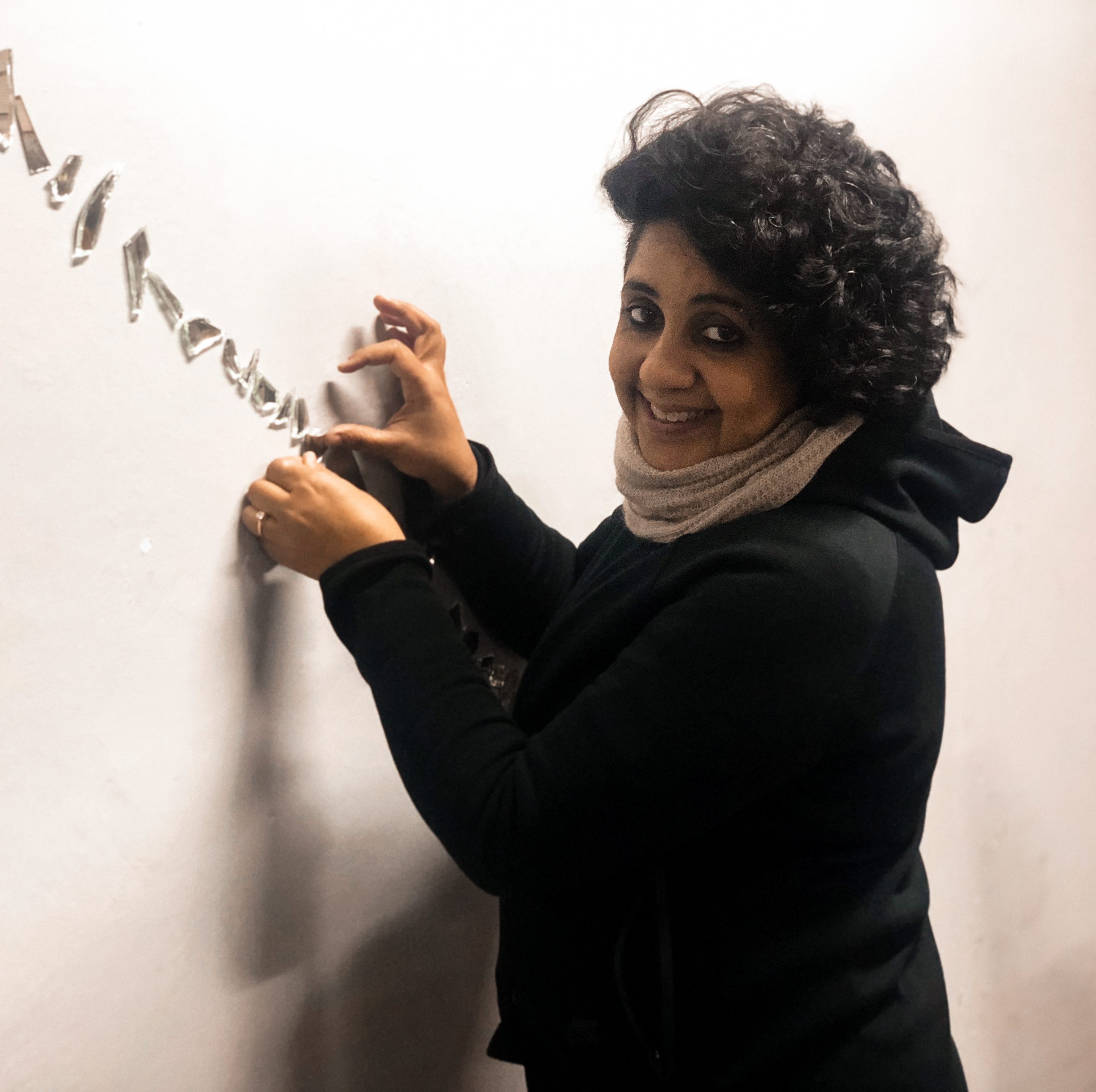
- Vibha Galhotra
- Born: 1978 (age 47–48)
- Occupation: Indian conceptual artist

Vibha Galhotra(born 1978) is an Indian conceptual artist based in New Delhi. Her work includes large-scale installations, sculptures, drawings, and films that explore themes of ecological and environmental concerns. Her works address the shifting topography of the world under the impact of globalisation and growth. She sees herself as being part of the restructuring of culture, society and geography of New Delhi, and the world.

== Early life and education ==
Vibha Galhotra was born in Kaithal, Haryana, India in 1978. In 1999 she completed Bachelor in Fine Arts from the Government College of Arts, Chandigarh. In 2002 she completed her Master in Fine arts from Kala Bhavan in Santiniketan. She currently lives in New Delhi.

== Career ==
Galhotra is a conceptual artist. According to Art in America, Galhotra's work is concerned with urban development, global concerns and ecological issues. The Hindu has called her work about environmental issues "sharp and cutting." One of her "trademark" artistic conventions is the use of ghungroos.

== Awards and Fellowships ==
- Sanatan Sangeet Sanskriti Puraskar, 2024
- Jerusalem International Fellows - Jerusalem, Israel, 2022
- Asia Art Future at Asia Art Game Changer Award India – 2019
- Rockefeller Grant at their Bellagio Center – 2016
- Asian Cultural Council Fellowship in the U.S.A. – 2017.
- YFLO Woman Achiever of the Year Award – 2015
- Inlaks Foundation Fine Arts Award – 2005-06
- The National Scholarship from the Human Resource Department, Government of India – 2001-02
- Artist Under 30 Award-Chandigarh State Lalit Kala Academy Award – 1998

== Solo shows, projects, and participation ==
=== 2022 - 23 ===
- Silent Seasons- Nature Morte, New Delhi, India
- Breathing- Hamburger-Kunsthalle, Hamburg, Germany

=== 2021 ===
- We Do Not Dream Alone- Asia Society Triennial, New York

=== 2020 ===
- Beyond the Blue - Jackshainman Gallery New York, 2020
- Down to Earth - Gropius Bau, Berlin, Germany
- Zero Waste - Museum of Fine Arts -Leipzig, Germany

=== 2019 ===
- Climateric - PLKA Gallery - Punjab Kala Bhawan - Chandigarh - India
- Brave New World - Jack Shainman Gallery – New York

=== 2018 ===
- Facing India - Curated by Dr.Uta Ruhkamp - The Kunstmuseum Wolfsburg - Germany
- Delirium/Equilibrium- Curated by Roobina Karode - Kiran Nader Museum of Art - Delhi
- Art - Poetry: The Last Innocences - Instituto Cervantes - Delhi
- Mutations - IndoFrench Image Encounters curated by Rahaab Allana & Francois Cheval - New Delhi

=== 2017 ===
- Insanity in the Age of Reason - New Delhi - India
- Water Line: A Creative Exchange - Center for Visual Art | Metropolitan State University of Denver U.S.A.
- The Darkened Mirror: Global Perspectives on Water San Jose Museum of Art, San Jose, CA, USA
- Unfiltered: An Exhibition About Water - William Benton Museum of Art Connecticut U.S.A.
- Kailash Cartographies - Sheila C. Johnson Design Center - Parsons School of Design/The New School, New York
- Sculpture Park curated by Peter Nagy-Nahargarh Fort-Jaipur-India
- Hold...On. Buddha Enlightened Art & World Peace 2017 Buddha Enlightened, Art & World Peace 2017 Bodh Gaya India

=== 2016 ===
- Land Art Biennial LAM 360° Mongolia
- Where do we come from? What are we? Where are we going? a Cook Book project India
- Meri Kahani Aankhon ki Jubaani a visual arts project with Apne Aap Women Worldwide.
- Garden of Dreams, a blindfold walk project, Kathmandu, Nepal

=== 2015 ===
- Absur–City–Pity–Dity - Jack Shainman Gallery, New York
- Winter in America - The School, Kinderhook, New York
- Piece by Piece- Building a Collection, Kemper Museum of Contemporary, Kansas City, Missouri
- Walking on the Planet, Casa Masaccio / Centro per l’arte Contemporanea, Corso, Italy

=== 2014 ===
- The Black Cloud Project - public participatory project, India
- Mise En Scène The School, Kinderhook, NY
- Past Tradition - Curated by Diana Campbell Betancourt,, New Delhi
- Forms of Activism- curated by Vivan Sundaram & Sasha Altaf, L K A, New Delhi
- Multiplicity- City as subject /Matter”, Curated by Marco Antonini, Nurture Art Gallery, New York
- Citizens of Time, curated by Veeranganakumari Solanki, Dhaka Art Summit
- Bright Noise- curated by Girish Shahane, Lalit Kala Academy, Chennai
- Is there love in this air- Art Oxygen, Mumbai

=== 2013 ===
- Sediments and Other Untitled... - Exhibit 320, New Delhi, India
- Alter - curated by Lucie Fontane, Mk search art gallery, Italy
- Icastica “Arezzo Biennial - Arezzo Italy
- Souvenir - curated by Lucie Fontane, Galerie Perrotin, Paris, France
- Sculpture on the Beach - Art Dubai, 2013. Curated by Chus Martinez
- Haein Art project Curated by Art O2 Haeinsa temple, Korea

=== 2012 ===
- Utopia of Difference- Jack Shainman Gallery, New York
- Metropia- Southeastern Center for Contemporary Art, Winston-Salem, North Carolina
- Re-BirthDay- Centro per l’Arte Contemporanea, Piazza Cavour, San Giovanni Valdarno, Italy 2011
- Neo Monster - an on-going public art project, displayed at different locations, New Delhi, Hornbill Festival Nagaland India/“Becoming” curated by Suresh Jairam, Colombo Art Biennial, Sri Lanka /Art Riga Latvia/ San Giovanni Valdarno, Italy
- Contemporary Renaissance- Casa Masaccio, San Giovanni Valdarno (Arezzo) Italy
- Becoming- Colombo Art Biennale - Sri Lanka “Theertha International Artists Collective”- Colombo, Sri Lanka

=== 2010 ===
- India Awakening Under the Banyan Tree- Essl Museum, Austria

=== 2009 ===
- Aluminum - 4th Baku Biennale, Azerbaijan
- Space Invader - Aicon Art Gallery, London, UK India
- Xianzai - Museum of Contemporary Art Shanghai, China

=== 2008 ===
- Metropia - Project 88, Mumbai, India
- Best of Discovery - Sh Contemporary, Shanghai, China
- Destination Asia: Flying over Stereotypes – Conversation: Artists from Central Asia and South Asia, Dubai

=== 2006 ===
- Where Do We Come From? What are we? Where Are We Going? - New Delhi, India
- Brazier International Artists Workshop UK

=== 2005 ===
- Between Me and Delhi - Anant Art Gallery, New Delhi, India
- Unclaimed Luggage - Artrageous Group Cyprus
- Bag Factory Fordsburg Artist Studio (Bag Factory) -South Africa

=== 2004 ===
- White - MS University, Baroda, India

=== 2002 ===
- Space within the Space - Max Mueller Bhavan, New Delhi, India

== Collections ==
Her work has been shown or is in the collections of the Kiran Nadar Museum of Arts, Pizzuti Collection, Casa Masaccio Arte Contemporanea, the Singapore Art Museum, Essl Museum, Austria, Devi Art Foundation, India, and Europas Park.
