= 108 Portraits of Indian Culture and Heritage =

Book series by Alka Pande

- Box set slipcover panel
- Author: Alka Pande
- Language: English
- Subject: Indian art and culture
- Genre: Encyclopedia
- Publisher: Artshila Trust
- Publication date: February 8, 2024
- Publication place: New Delhi
- Media type: Print: hardcover, trade paperback
- ISBN: 978-81-1931-422-5
- Website: www.arthshila.org

108 Portraits of Indian Culture and Heritage is a 14-volume series of books by Alka Pande, published by Artshila Trust. Each volume covers a single discipline and includes 108 entries, or "narratives" — for a total of 1,512 across the series — along with introductions incorporating personal reminiscences by the author.

The title and format were chosen, according to Pande, to honor the historical importance of the number 108 in Indian culture, as reflected in the 108 beads of a japamala and the same number of energy points in the Sri Yantra.

Pande wrote the series over a period of five years, drawing from her previous decades of research across the disciplines as an art historian, teacher and curator. While she considers it encyclopedic in scope, it is not structured as a reference work, and it is written in nonacademic English in order to make its contents broadly accessible.

The series was released simultaneously in hardcover and paperback in February 2024, both as a box set and as individual titles.

== Volumes ==
- 108 Portraits of Indian Traditional Art
- 108 Portraits of Indian Modern and Contemporary Art
- 108 Portraits of Indian Music
- 108 Portraits of Indian Dance
- 108 Portraits of Indian Sculpture
- 108 Portraits of Indian Architecture
- 108 Portraits of Indian Objects
- 108 Portraits of Indian Food
- 108 Portraits of Indian Printmaking
- 108 Portraits of Indian Design
- 108 Portraits of Indian Vernacular and Indigenous Art
- 108 Portraits of Indian Textile
- 108 Portraits of Indian Crafts
- 108 Portraits of Indian Photography
