= Gurpreet Singh (artist) =

Indian painter (born 1976)

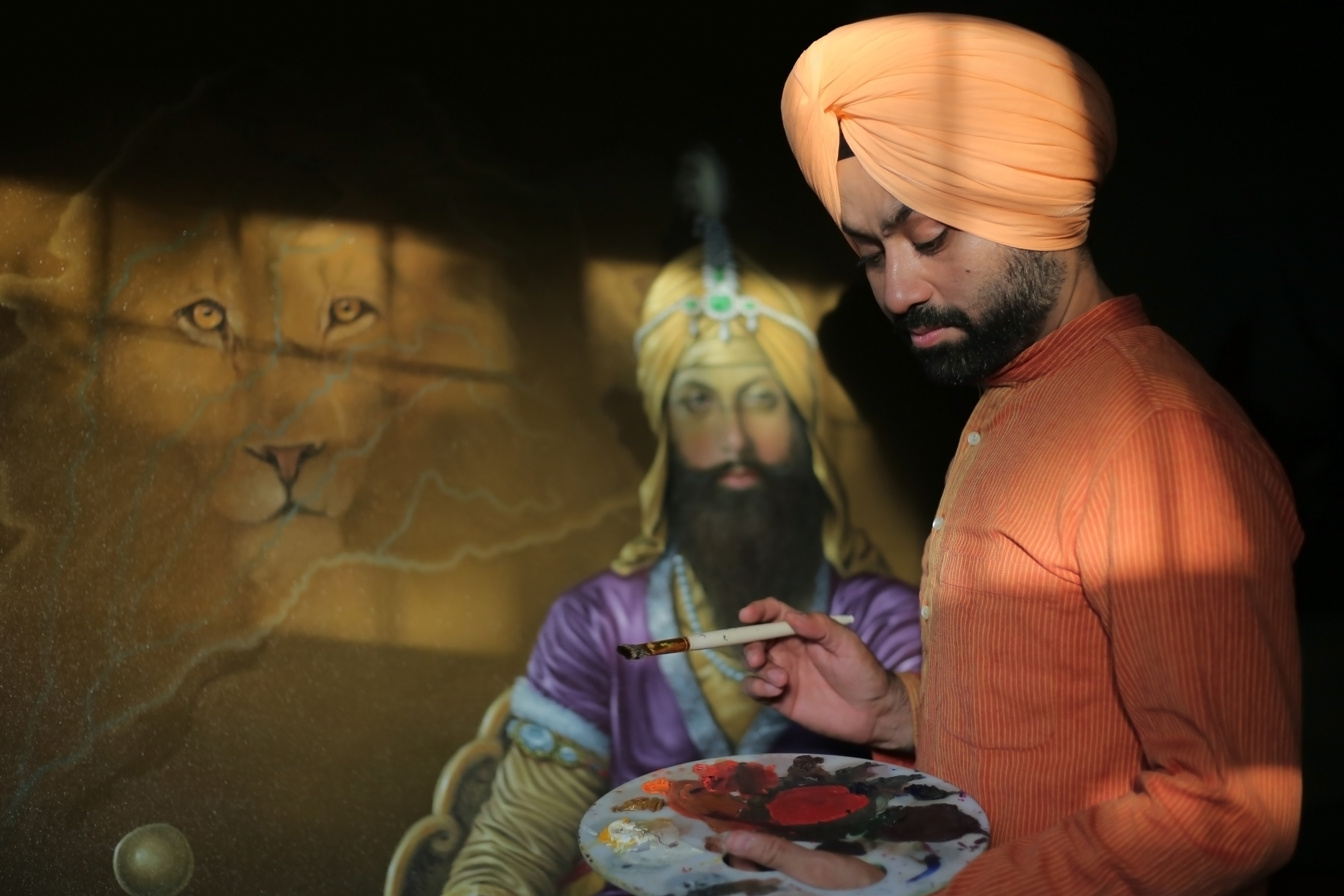
Gurpreet Artist Bathinda

Gurpreet Singh (born 24 July 1976) is a modern Indian painter of local acclaim, he also has a hand in photography. He had received awards and held painting exhibitions in Punjab.

== Early life ==
Gurpreet Singh was born in a Sikh family on 24 July 1976 in Bathinda to a Shinh (Punjabi: ਸ਼ੀੰਹ) family who trace their roots back to Rajasthan. Primarily self-taught, Gurpreet painted piece paintings and made sculptures in Bathinda early in his career. To earn extra money, he worked for a toy company designing and building toys when he was in 10th Grade. He completed college B.A., M.A. History of Fine Arts from GNDU Amritsar and M. A. Fine Arts from Jiwaji University Gwalior. He married Ghazal in 2000. The couple have two children, a boy and a girl Kunwar jai Singh and Sargam.

== Painting Works ==
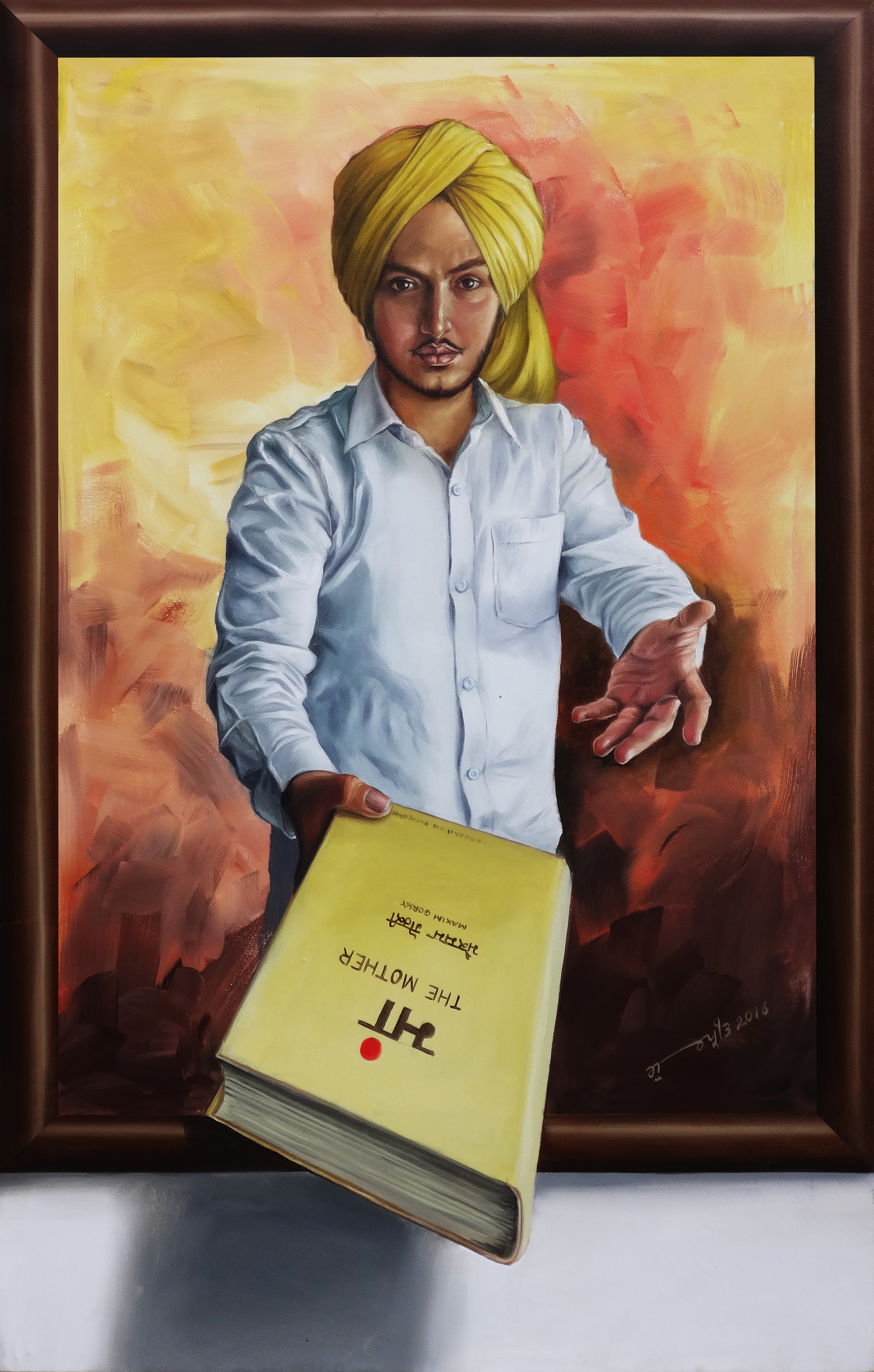

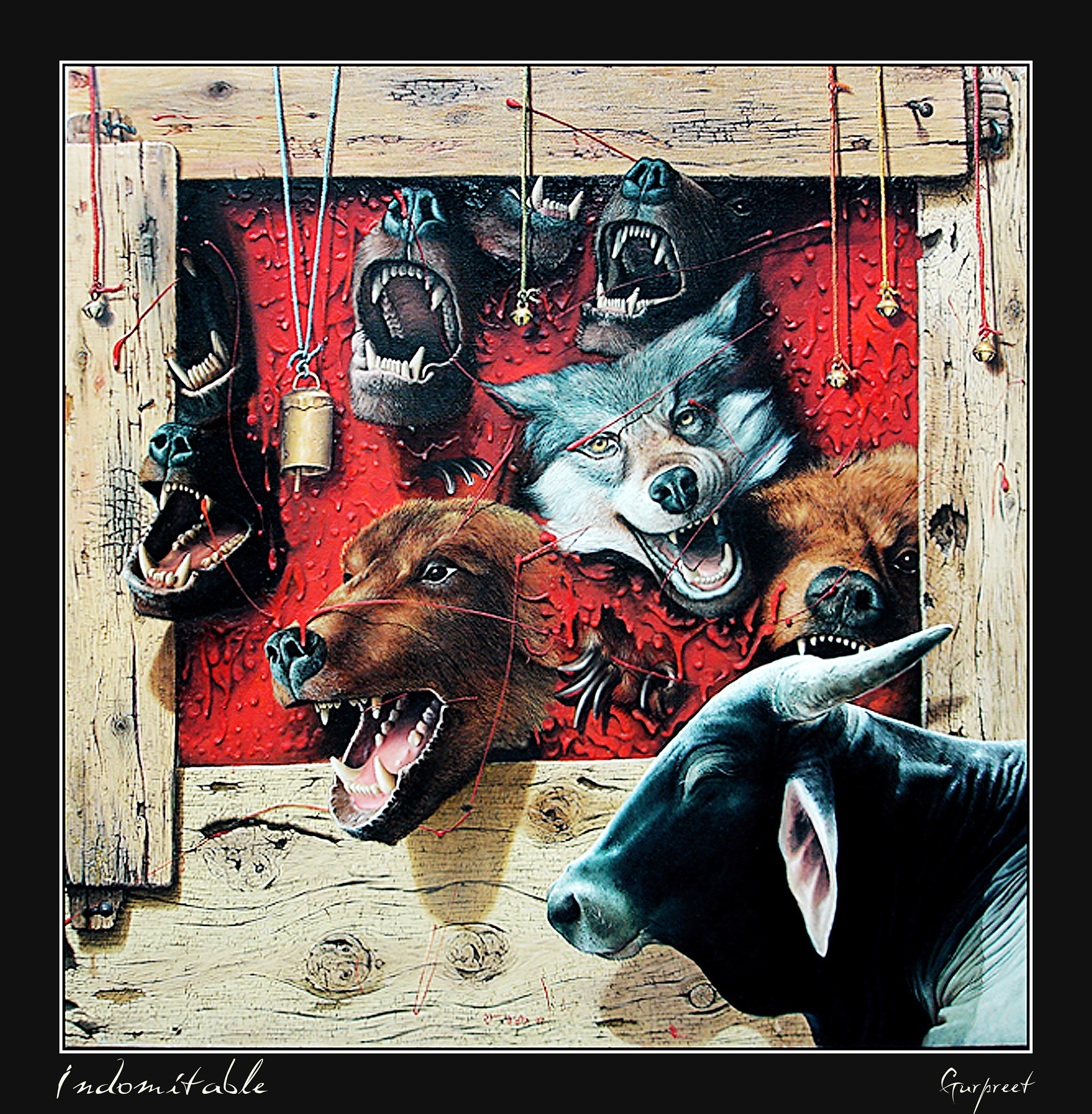
Painting 'The Indomitable' by Gurpreet Artist Bathinda

In his career Gurpreet Singh has painted hundreds of paintings where his main focus is on Sikh History. He has done several series such as on bulls or on meditation. Gurpreet Singh, has been awarded the state award for painting by the Punjab Lalit Kala Akademi. He was given Professional Category's Award for his painting "Indomitable". He said "In this painting I have shown a bull symbolising an honest and strong common man. He cannot be dominated by evil forces of society. Some barking and howling wild animals are shown at the back as a symbol of evil forces. And old wooden frame depicts the orthodox social structure," he said.

=== Awards ===
- 1995 Awarded for work on Sikh History at World Sikh Conference Amritsar
- 1996 Best Painting Award Sobha Singh Memorial Artist Society Bathinda
- 1997 Best Painting Award Sobha Singh Memorial Artist Society Bathinda
- 1997 Best Painting Award 2nd Bank of Punjab, Art Exhibition, Lalit Kala Academy, Punjab Kala Bhawan CHD
- 1998 Best Painting Award Kalapana Fine Arts Society, Ludhiana
- 1999 Awarded by Norah Richards Memorial Art & Theatre Society
- 2002 Awarded by Sobha Singh Memorial Artist Society Bathinda for valuable contribution in the field of Art
- 2004 Awarded by Bathinda Region Heritage Foundation for valuable contribution in the field of Art
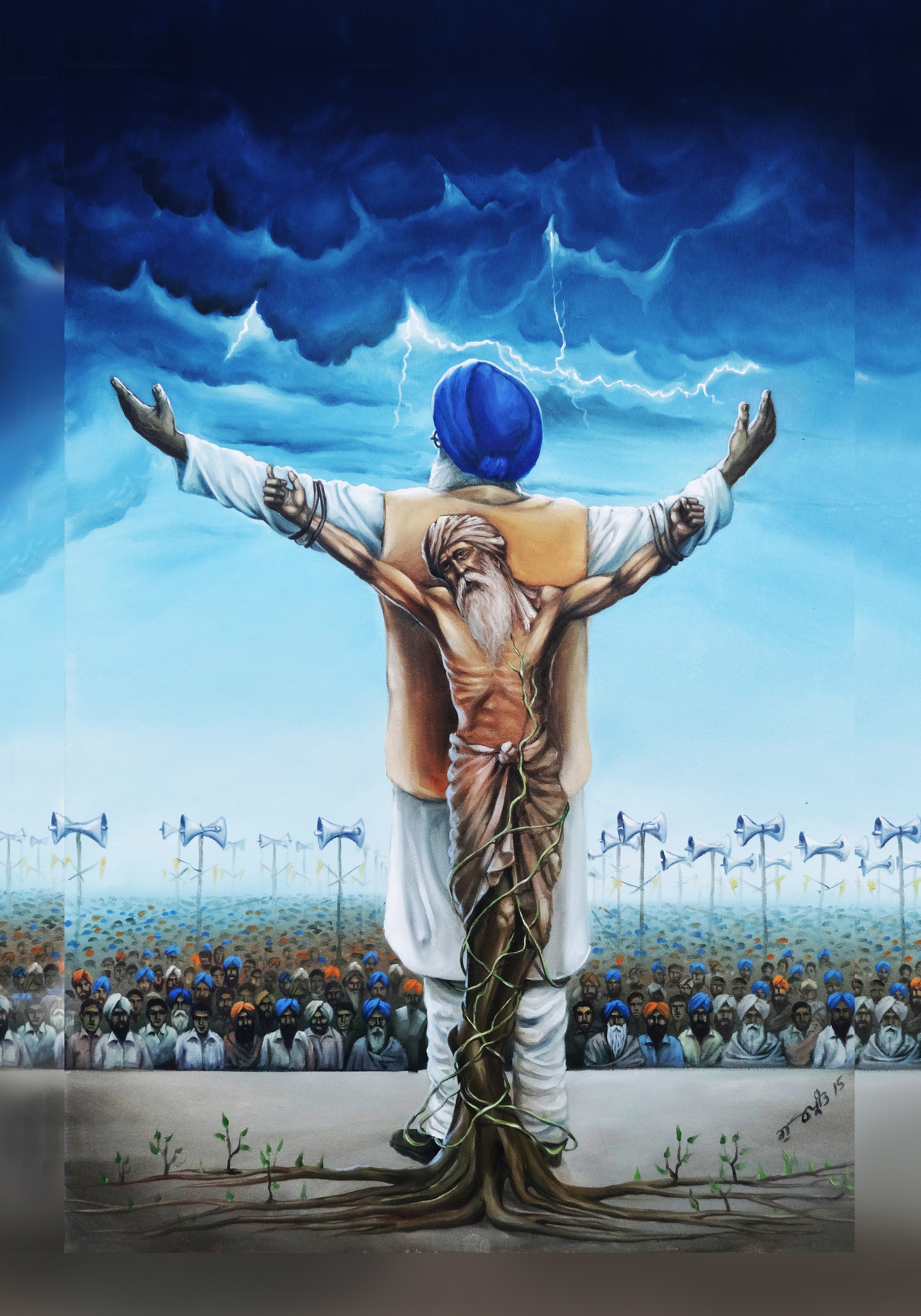
  reality at the back - gurpreet artist bathinda
  2004 Awarded by Capt. Amrinder Singh Chief Minister, Punjab for valuable contribution in the field of Art.
- 2015 Punjab Lalit Kala Akademi Award
