= Thukral & Tagra =

Indian visual artist duo

Jiten Thukral and Sumir Tagra
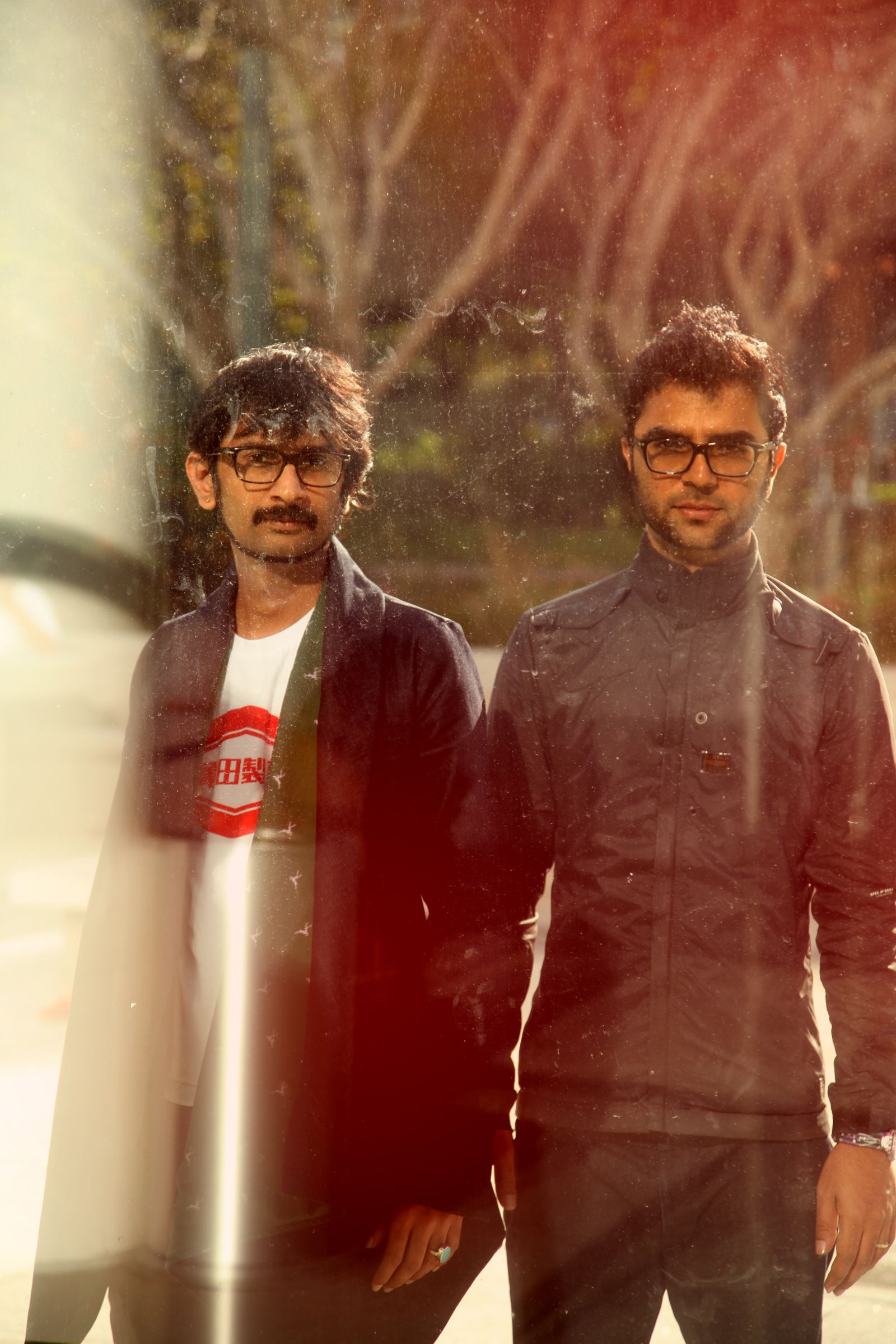
- Jiten Thukral and Sumir Tagra standing outside YBCA San Francisco
- Born: Thukral: 1976 (age 49–50); Tagra: 1979 (age 46–47); Jalandhar, New Delhi, India
- Website: www.thukralandtagra.com

Thukral and Tagra are an artist duo composed of Jiten Thukral and Sumir Tagra. They work with a wide range of media including painting, sculpture, installations, interactive games, video, performance & design.

Over the years they have had numerous exhibitions at the sixth edition of the Asia Pacific Triennial, Centre Georges Pompidou in Paris Arken Museum in Denmark, Kunstmuseum in Bochum, Lyon Museum of Contemporary Art, and Mori Art Museum in Tokyo. In 2010 they held a solo show "Match Fixed" at the Ullens Centre of Contemporary Art in Beijing and in 2015 they were invited to mount a solo show Games People Play at the Dr. Bhau Daji Lad Museum in Mumbai.

== Education ==
Jiten Thukral was born in 1976 in Jalandhar, Punjab. He earned his BFA from Government College of Arts, Chandigarh in 1998 and his MFA in 2000 at College of Art, Delhi.

Sumir Tagra was born in 1979 in New Delhi. He completed his BFA in 2002 from College of Art, Delhi and received his post-graduate degree at National Institute of Design, Ahmedabad.

== Residencies ==
In 2009 Thukral & Tagra were invited to do a residency at Singapore Tyler Print Institute. In 2011 they were invited for a residency at Edition Copenhagen and also at the Meissen Porcelain Manufactory near Dresden, Germany. In 2015 they were a part of a residency at Khoj International Artists Association that resulted in an exhibition titled Level 01 in January 2016 at KHOJ.

== Reviews and features ==
Georgina Maddox of The Hindu said, "Art provocateurs or nerds with a gaming obsession — Thukral and Tagra continue to challenge the norms of fine art and pop culture with interactive works that question GST, water woes and more.". Avantika Bhuyan of Livemint wrote, "Thukral and Tagra’s ongoing project drives people to become part of the process of art-making."

== Works and exhibitions ==
Bread, Circuses and ...

The series “Bread, Circuses” aka “panem et circuses” takes its reference from the metaphor of the Roman practice: stage as a sight for competition but also for the display of sportsmanship, but equally as a mode of daily survival strategies. The “Bread, Circuses and ….” represents a series of work that reflects on the lives of people as affected by everyday politics, societal and cultural norms. The duo addresses the discursive cultural economy/ contemporary societies through their visual dialogues, aesthetics, and systems. The work was exhibited at

- "Bread, Circuses and I", Nature Morte, New Delhi, 2019
- "Farmer Is A Wrestler" - Punjab Lalit Kala Akademi, Chandigarh, 2019
- "Bread, Circuses and TBD", Yorkshire Sculpture Park, 2019
- "Bread, Circuses and You", Art Fair, Dubai, 2017
- "Bread, Circuses and Wifi", Pearl Lam Gallery, Hong Kong, 2017

Memoir Bar

Memoir bar is a traveling exhibition that invites viewers to write a memory on a paper, shred it and watch it being made into a tile. The aim is to construct a large sanctuary of compressed emotions by mapping the emotions of a city. This interactive installation is a site of emotional recall that gets solidified into a tactile form. The work was exhibited at

- "Memoir Bar", India Art Fair, 2017
- "Memoir Bar", Dubai Design District, 2016
- "Memoir Bar", Chatterjee & Lal, Mumbai, 2016

Match Fixed/ Fixed Match

Continuing their research into the Punjabi Indian diaspora, Match Fixed/Fixed Match was first exhibited at the Ullens Center for Contemporary Art in 2010, conceived in response to the “holiday wives” in Punjab as a cultural puncture in the social fabric of the artists' home state, where the idea of migrating abroad is built with desperations and negotiations. The exhibition also serves as a case study of how international dreams have deteriorated the fabric of hometown culture. The work was exhibited at

- "Match Fixed/ Fixed Match" - Le Tripostal, Lille, France, 2019
- "Match Fixed/ Fixed Match" - Ullens Centre for Contemporary Art Beijing, 2010

Lullaments

The idea of play has evolved into a series of works considering the meditative aspects of play, while simultaneously trying to illustrate Indian mythology through the vocabulary of Ping-Pong that challenges the preconceived notions of cultural matter as pedantic knowledge. The work was exhibited at

- "Lullaments" - Ludwigsburg Kunstverein, Germany, 2019
- "Lullaments" - Stir Gallery, New Delhi, 2018

Table Manners

The exhibition narrates the social reality through the vocabulary of ping pong which also challenges the notion of culture as entertainment. The installation of 3 modified ping-pong tables critiques on the fact, how technology has gotten immersed into the fabric of our everyday lives in an intrusive manner. The work was exhibited at

- "Table Manners"- Palace Of Independence, Astana, Kazakhstan

Breaking Ground

The exhibition is an extension to the residency at Meissen porcelain manufactory by Thukral and Tagra back in 2011 as a part of an art campus program. The large body of work had three overlapping narratives. The exhibition took place at the Breaking Ground, Indian Ceramic Triennale. The sculptures displayed were conceived on playful manifestations and assumptions using Meissen‘s rich archive. The work tries to bring down the authority of the material to a more approachable popular imagery by illustrating the daily struggles of contemporary. The project attempts to be both eternal and fragmentary in nature. The work was exhibited at

- "Breaking ground" - Indian Ceramic Triennale (Ist Edition), Jawahar Kala Kendra, Jaipur, 2018

Pollinator

The Pollinator is an interdisciplinary lab that interrogates the complex understanding of ‘value’ by building a dialogue as a practice in ethics, intention, aesthetics, and education. It pollinates a new discourse each time by further placing it into a coherent collection. The work was exhibited at

- "Collection Bureau", 2018: The Collection Bureau acts as an agency to evaluate a work of art. It functions as a provisional consortium in developing cultural production in a compelling manner. The project is an attempt to interrogate the complex understanding of ‘value’ of a work of art, by building a dialogue as a practice in ethics, intention, aesthetics, archiving and education, further placing it into a collection that is coherent and complete.
- "Nafrat/ Parvah", 2020: ‘Hate / Concern’ is positioned as two polarised sentiments that have occupied our collective minds in the present moment. Nafrat/ Parvah is a collaborative project by Pollinator which explores the vocabularies, aesthetics and value systems of these antagonistic forces.

Longing for Tomorrow II

This series of work is a mix of sentimentality, nostalgia, and clichéd futurisms which is epitomized by the rising Indian middle-class. The mixture of high and low styles in paintings, sculptures and decorative accouterments is an apt response to this bewildering and perverse urban reality typifying the “new India.” The work was exhibited at

- "Longing for Tomorrow II", German Ambassador's Residence, New Delhi, 2013

Walk Of Life

Walk of Life explores the idea of ‘play’ from a cultural, strategic, and psychological perspective.

Walk of Life is built upon the ancient Indian card game called “Ganjifa”, originally played with a set of 120 cards, the artists have turned it into a board game that takes its reference from Dashavatar, the ten incarnations of the Hindu god, Lord Vishnu. Walk of Life 2; As an extension to the previous game walk of life 2, it is based on the idea of water conservation as a journey through the Kali Yuga dealing with real-time events of contemporary times. The game is based on 12 rounds of collective decision making between the players in order to conserve as much water in the finite collective reservoir as possible in order to win the game. The work was exhibited at

- "Walk Of Life" - Level 01 - Khoj International Artists Association, Delhi, 2016
- "(Water) - Climate Control", The Manchester Museum, Manchester, 2016
- "Walk of Life", Fed Galleries, Michigan 2016
- "Walk Of Life" - Of Games Residencies III - Khoj International Artists Association, New Delhi, 2015
- "Games people play", Dr Bhau Daji Lad Museum, Mumbai, 2015

Double Bounce

The following exhibition rejuvenates the traditional narratives and symbols to give audiences a fresh understanding of cultural matters of Indian Mythology through the informational Venn Diagram that is synonymous with Kali Yuga and Dashavatar of Lord Vishnu. The work was exhibited at

- Double Bounce, Pearl Lam Galleries, Singapore, 2019

Q

The artists’ long engagement with their home state Punjab, focus on the aspirational value of the urban Indian middle class and the desire to migrate or ‘escape’ abroad. The notion of middle-class success is synonymous with the desire towards the accumulation of material wealth. The exhibition unpacks a series of portraits of “Punjabi Home Boys” leaving and returning by virtue of a social and cultural movement in pursuit of their ambitions, architectural style in the suburban homes turning into surrealist castles commonly referred to as “Punjabi Baroque and ambiguity between dream and substance. The work was exhibited at

- "Adolescere-Domus", Art Basel 38, Nature Morte, 2007
- "Chalo! India: A New Era of Indian Art", Mori Art Museum, Tokyo, 2009
- "Escape for the Dream Land", Asia Pacific Triennial of Contemporary Arts 06, 2009
- “Nouveau Riche", Nature Morte, 2009
- "SAMDIGIT", Kulturhuset, Stockholm, 2010
- "Middle-Class Dreams", Arario Gallery, Seoul, 2010
- "Inside India", Palazzo Saluzzo di Paesana, Turin, 2010
- “Match Fixed”, Ullens Center for Contemporary Art, Beijing, 2010
- "German returned", Nature Morte, Gurgaon, 2011
- "Nosturistic", Hilger Contemporary, Vienna, 2012
- "ESCAPE: Reset-Resume - India Today", Arken Museum of Modern Art, Denmark, 2012
- "Windows of Opportunity", Art Plural, Singapore, 2013
- "Island", Dairy Art Centre, London, 2013

Put it on, Again!

Put it on is a research project which explores alternate mediums to spread awareness in context to HIV transmission and the AIDS epidemic. It is about identifying the gaps in the current communications around education, prevention and aims to provide solutions where existing media have failed to achieve results. The work was exhibited at

- "Put it on, Again!", Gallery Nature Morte, New Delhi, 2011

== Publications ==
- Somnium Seminibus
- Walk of Life
- Bridge is a Spine
- The Book of Flipping Desires
- Bathtub
- Meissien – Volume One
- Q
- STPI
- Thukral & Tagra – 2007
