= Shiv Singh =

Indian-Punjabi artist

- Born: 5 July 1938; Bassi Gulam Hussain Hoshiarpur, India
- Died: 25 June 2015 (aged 76); Chandigarh, India
- Education: Government Art and Craft School, Shimla & Government College of Art and Craft, Chandigarh
- Known for: Sculpture

Shiv Singh (5 July 1938 – 25 June 2015) was an Indian-Punjabi artist, known mainly for his work as a sculptor.

== Early life ==
Shiv Singh was born at Bassi Gulam Hussain village near Hoshiarpur in Punjab, India. His father was a landlord who owned around 35 acres of farmland in the village. Shiv Singh did his early schooling (till class IV) at the village school and then joined DAV Senior Secondary School in Hoshiarpur from where he did his matriculation.

== Education and career ==
In 1958 Shiv Singh took to studying art at the Government Art and Craft School at Shimla. It was later shifted to Chandigarh with a new name as Government College of Art and Craft, from where he finished his five-year degree course in 1962. He started teaching at Sainik School in Kapurthala in 1963. In 1968 German government offered him a scholarship in advanced studies and research in art for three years exposing the young artist to international art scene. Upon his return he joined Government Home Science College in Chandigarh in 1971 continuing to work on commissioned and personal basis. Known for working mainly with iron and sometimes wood, Shiv Singh’s creations are placed at National Gallery of Modern Art, New Delhi; National Academy of Art (Lalit Kala Akademi) New Delhi; Chandigarh Museum; Panjab University Museum; Punjab Agricultural University, Ludhiana; State Museum, Shimla; Hack Museum, Ludwigshafen; Glaub Art Museum, Koln (Germany) and Haryana State Tourism (Tourist Resort) besides at many public spaces. Shiv Singh was the chairman of the Chandigarh Lalit Kala Akademi from 1999 to 2005 and was also the president of the Punjab Lalit Kala Akademi. He held a total of 66 one-man shows in India, Germany, Denmark, Sweden, Scotland, Canada, England and other parts of Europe, besides participating in numerous national and international group exhibitions and festivals of art. More on www.gnmps.org

== Personal life ==
Shiv Singh married Gisela, a German national in 1972. They had a son Yasvin Singh, who lives in Frankfurt, Germany.

Shiv Singh died of heart attack in a private hospital at Panchkula, Haryana on 25 June 2015.

== See also ==
- List of people from Punjab, India
