= Gurpreet Singh (professor) =

Engineer

Gurpreet Singh is a professor of Mechanical and Nuclear Engineering at [Kansas State University]. He is endowed by the Harold O. and Jane C. Massey Neff Professorship in Mechanical Engineering. Singh was born in Ludhiana, India; he currently resides in the United States.

== Education ==
Singh attended the College of Engineering, Pune and graduated with a bachelor's degree in Mechanical Engineering in 2003. He obtained his master's degree in 2006 and his doctoral degree in 2007, both in Mechanical Engineering, from the University of Colorado Boulder. His doctoral advisor was Roop Mahajan. Singh's doctoral co-advisor was J. Richard McIntosh. Singh, along with J. Richard McIntosh invented the Nanoknife.

== Career ==
Singh worked as a postdoctoral associate at Institute of Critical Technologies and Applied Science at Virginia Tech, before joining as an assistant professor at Kansas State University in 2009.

== Research ==
Singh is the principal investigator of National Science Foundation-Partnerships in International Research and Education-Ceramics project at Kansas State University. He also heads the NanoScience and Engineering lab at the College of Engineering at K-State.

In 2018, Singh was awarded two patents related to polymer-derived ceramics. His first patent is titled, "Aluminum-modified polysilazanes for polymer-derived ceramic nanocomposites" (United States Patent 9908905). His second patent is titled, "Silicon-based polymer-derived ceramic composites comprising H-BN nanosheets" (United States Patent 10093584). In 2017, he was awarded a five year, approximately $5 million grant from the National Science Foundation Partnerships for International Research and Education. This award is to pursue creation of high-temperature ceramics for use in gas turbine engines. These PDCs can withstand higher temperatures than metal alloys and are designed to replace metallic materials in gas turbines. This would allow gas turbines to operate at higher temperatures, which may result in increasing engine thrust by as much as 25%, while reducing fuel usage by 10%. His research on polymer derived ceramic and carbon nanotube composite thermal absorber coatings has been highlighted in National Institute of Standards and Technology (NIST) technical beat. Singh's research on liquid phase exfoliation of 2-D crystals to generate atomically thin sheets of graphene oxide, tungsten and molybdenum disulfide for high capacity metal-ion batteries has appeared in top journals, including American Chemical Society and Nature. Singh is the recipient of the National Science Foundation CAREER Awards for his research on two-dimensional transition metal dichalcogenide and graphene materials for rechargeable metal-ion batteries. Singh has more than 140 technical publications (journal papers, conference papers, patents, books and technical abstracts) to his credit. Singh has a google h-index of 34. He is Elected Fellow of the American Society of Mechanical Engineers (ASME) and the American Ceramic Society (ACerS)

== Awards ==
- Fellow of the American Ceramic Society, ACerS (Class of 2025)
- Fellow of the American Society of Mechanical Engineers, ASME (Election Year 2022)
- Frankenhoff Outstanding Research Award (2021)
- NSF Career Award (2015-2020)
- Chairman of the editorial board of the American Ceramic Society Bulletin: 2017-2018
- Member of the Editorial Board, Nature-Scientific Reports (2013–present)
- Member of the Editorial Board, American Ceramic Society Bulletin (October 2015 – present)
- Member of the Editorial Board (September 2015 – present): Nanomaterials and Nanotechnology Journal
