= Nanoknife =

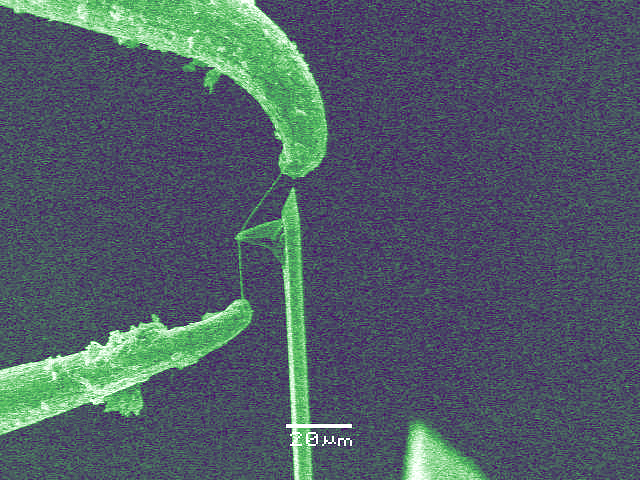
Scanning electron micrograph of a nanoknife. An individual carbon nanotube is being stretched between two tungsten needles. The triangular tip is an atomic force cantilever, measuring the knife's breaking point.(NIST)

A nanoknife is a carbon nanotube-based prototype compression cutting tool intended for sectioning of biological cells. Working principle is similar to that of a 'cheese slicer', a nanometer-thin individual carbon nanotube strung between two tungsten needles would allow sectioning of very thin slices of biological matter for imaging under an electron microscope. Tests are currently being performed by scientists at Virginia Tech, CU-Boulder and other universities. A successful development of this new tool will allow scientists and biologists to make 3D images of cells and tissues for electron tomography, which typically requires samples less than ~300 nanometers in thickness. In 2009, the nano-knife was used to create indentation marks on biological cell plasticizer (epoxy resin). The whole cutting process is currently limited by electron charging of polymeric specimen in the SEM, which makes it difficult to observe any small cut or mark as the carbon nanotube is pressed against the specimen.

Nanoknife Procedure

Doctors use a special medical device designed for the specific purpose of performing irreversible electroporation. The device implements a direct current generator which emits short pulses of high voltage electric current through electrodes into the cell membrane. The doctor inserts thin needles into the area, using ultrasound imaging to guide the placement of the needles. In nanoknife treatment, strong electric fields cause cells to die without exposing the tissue to radiation or heating it. Most patients don't feel anything at all during the procedure.
