= Gurpreet Kaur Sapra =

Indian Administrative Service officer

Gurpreet Kaur Sapra is an Indian Administrative Service officer and the District Commissioner of Mohali, Ajitgarh . in passed time.
