= Avtarjeet Singh Dhanjal =

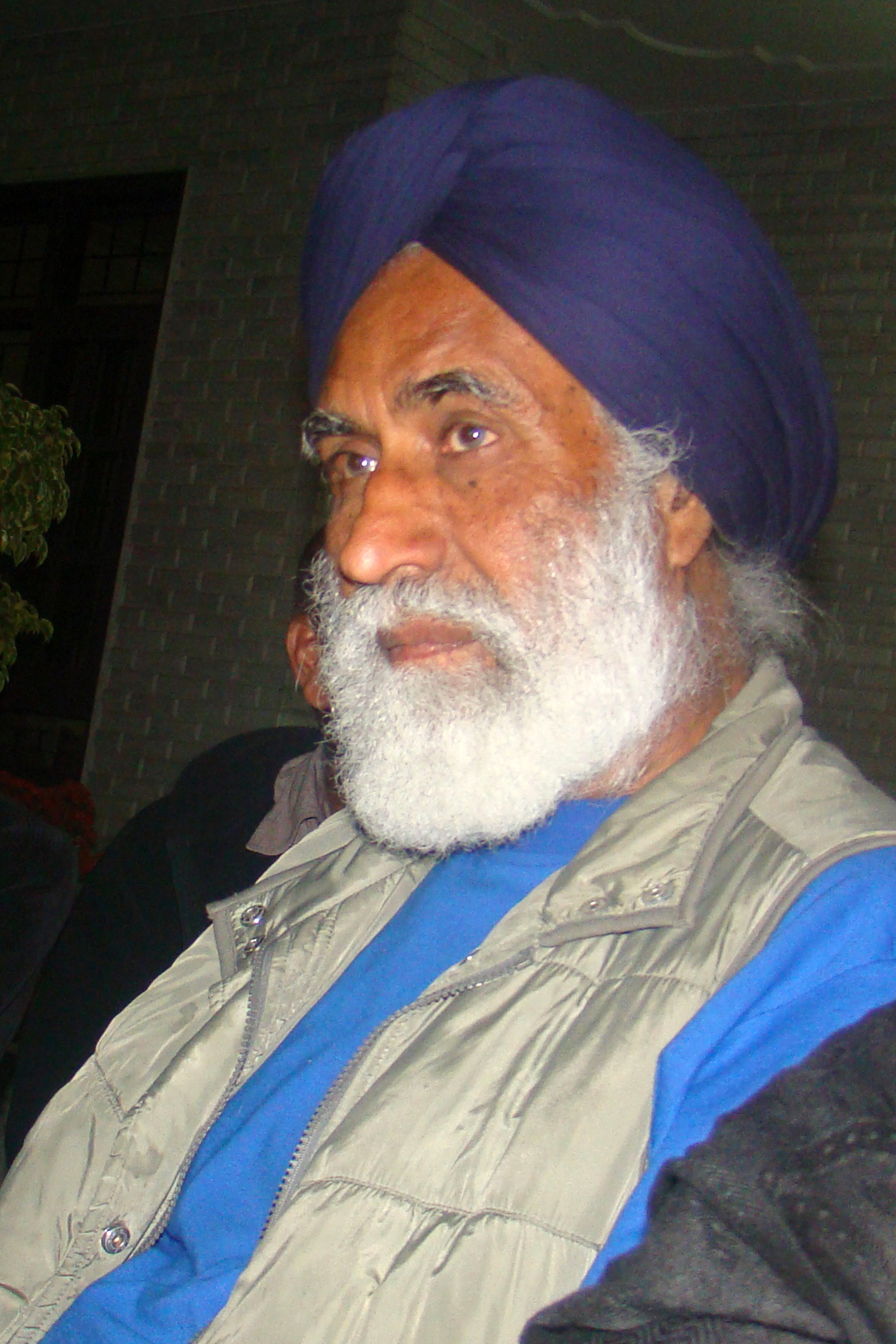
Avtarjeet Singh Dhanjal

Avtarjeet Singh Dhanjal (born 10 April 1940) is a British sculptor and a multi-media artist of Indian origin whose work has been shown internationally for over four decades. He is "an artist who, nourished by the tension between the cultures of East and West, occupies a singular place in contemporary sculpture".

Dhanjal's international reputation as an artist derives primarily from his work over many years, especially in the 1970s, 1980s and 1990s, where as a sculptor, he works using various mediums like wood, aluminium, stone as he seeks out the relation to natural substances like weathered rocks and soil in his sculpture. His more recent works are focused on photography, installation and writing.

After leaving Art School in 1970, he travelled extensively around East Africa, gaining a teaching post at the Kenyatta University in Nairobi, before giving this up to attend St Martin's School of Art, London in 1974. Dhanjal seeks to produce art that enhances the quality of human life – by inviting silence, stillness and contemplation. He argues that, to be truly creative, the artist needs to disengage himself from the races of contemporary society and the art world itself. That the artist's quest should be to escape from the crowd and become attuned to the inner silence.
