= Gurpreet Singh Dhuri =

Indian sculptor and special effects artist

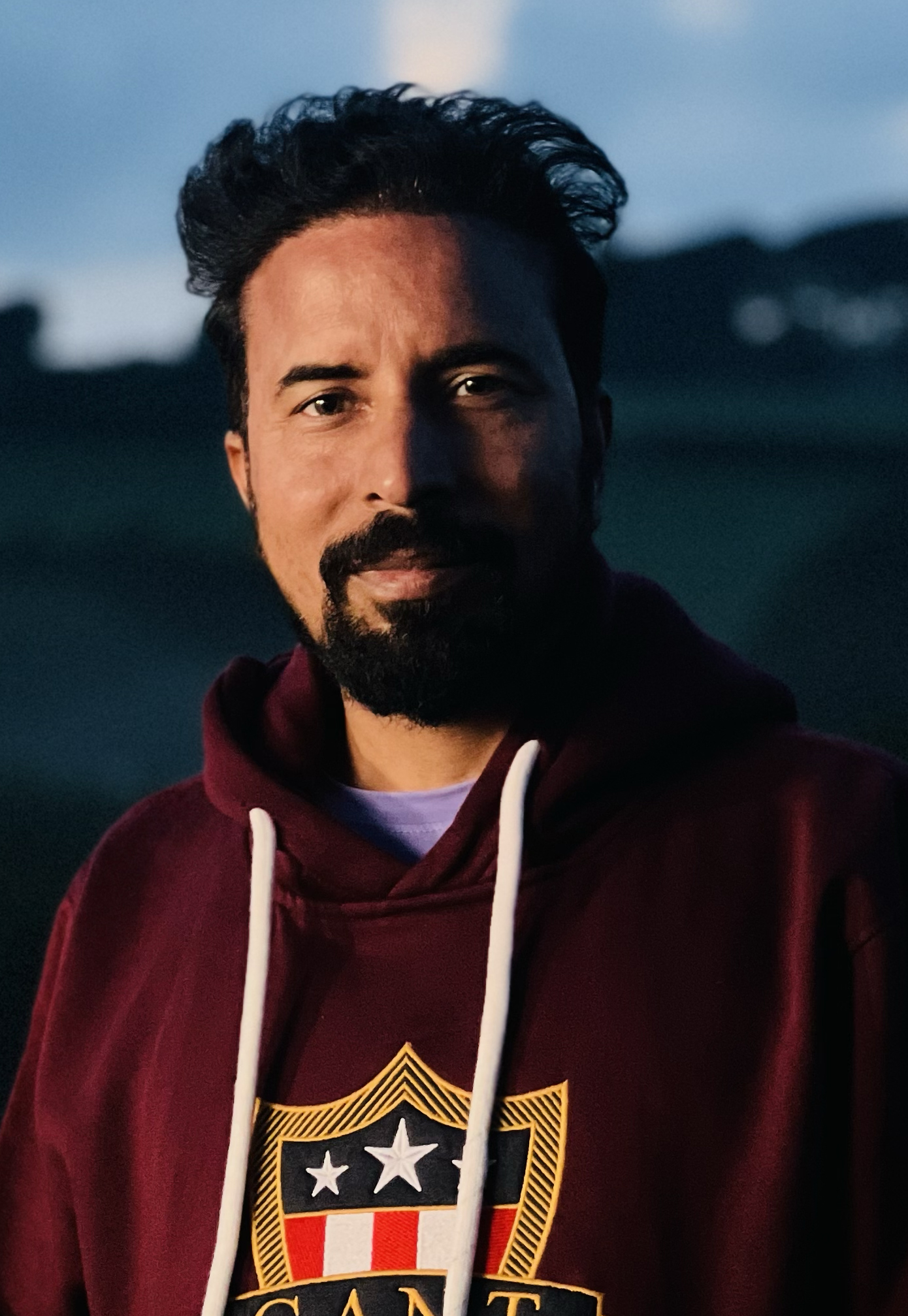
- Gurpreet Dhuri in, Bradworthy, United Kingdom
- Born: Gurpreet Singh; 26 December 1983 (age 42); Ghanaur Khurd, Punjab, India
- Education: Government College of Arts, Chandigarh (passed out in 2009)
- Occupations: Sculptor; Special make-up effects artist
- Years active: 2003–present
- Known for: Sculpture, portraiture and special make-up effects
- Website: gurpreetdhuri.com

Gurpreet Singh Dhuri (born 26 December 1983), or simply Dhuri, is an Indian sculptor and special make-up effects and installation artist. He is known for his clay modeling and portraiture in medium of sculpture and prosthetic makeup in Indian films. He is an alumnus of the Government College of Arts, Chandigarh where he completed a masters of fine art with a specialisation in sculpture.

== Early life and background ==
Born in a working-class family in Ghanaur Khurd in Punjab, India on 26 December 1983, to mother Joginder Kaur and father Labh Singh, he is the youngest among his four siblings. His father tried to continue the traditional shoemaking, the family’s ancestral occupation, in the small village of Ghanaur for many years. However, with the advent of new technology and trends in the shoe industry, the family business faced constant economic pressures. He managed to delay his resignation until Gurpreet Dhuri came of age. Eventually, his father gave up the trade and began working as a laborer in the sugar mill at Dhuri, carrying his tiffin box and commuting by bicycle.

This shift ensured the continuity of his children’s education, as the steady salary from the sugar mill began to provide financial stability. Despite the income, it wasn’t enough to grant Gurpreet a carefree childhood, and he had to take on work to help his family. His passion for colors and painting led him to work as an assistant to Rinku Painter. Here, he had his first encounter with paints. Dhuri learned the techniques of working with poster and enamel paints on cloth, walls, and metal sheets.

“By the time I passed matriculation, I had already realized that I had a special attraction to art, although I wasn’t fully aware of its scope as a profession. ... One day, my elder brother Gurmeet came to me with a newspaper clipping, suggesting it might interest me. Not fully understanding it, I took it to my primary teacher, who explained that it was an advertisement for admission to an art college. I immediately knew it was my destiny,” Gurpreet has stated.

After completing his 10+2 in 2000, he sought to find work and continued working with Rinku Painter in Dhuri, painting banners for advertisements and political campaigns during election seasons, a job that remained a part of his life for some time.

== Education ==
He joined graduation in a nearby college in the year 2001, which he left in the year 2002 when he cleared the entrance test for the Government College of Art, Chandigarh in July 2003. The art college was a new world to him but he could not afford to submerse himself into it fully due to the economic constraints. He took a bus every Friday to travel 128 km to his home town Dhuri to utilize the weekend by painting banners for an earning. He started getting some early sculpting commercial work in the third year of college itself, “I met many kind people, who were always ready to help, promote and encourage me. Most notably Mr. Rahi Mohinder Singh, painter and Sant Singh Dhuri, Rinku Painter Dhuri & Jagdeep Jolly". Dhuri further joined the MFA programme after graduating in the year 2006 and completed his masters in 2009.

== Career ==
After completing his MFA, Dhuri set out to explore the subfields of sculpture and art instead of looking for a job. He started experimenting with new materials like silicone and proceeded towards good results which invited public attention.

=== Sculpture ===
In 2004 he started working as a freelance sculptor for local clients and galleries, and later started getting invitations for sculpture workshops. In 2009 North Zone Cultural Centre Dimapur, Nagaland invited him to a stone carving workshop.

=== Special make-up effects ===
After completing the master's of visual art, He went to Gujarat to assist senior artists on a museum project in Ahmedabad. Around the same time, he entered the film industry, contributing prosthetic effects in Anurag Kashyap’s Gangs of Wasseypur (2012) with the same team. Their early work included creating realistic silicone props like a severed head and a pregnancy belly for Richa Chadha’s character. This marked the beginning of his journey in character design, portraiture, and special make-up effects.

== Filmography ==
- Detective Byomkesh Bakshy! (2015)
- Gangs of Wasseypur (2012)
- Gangs of Wasseypur – Part 1
- Gangs of Wasseypur – Part 2
- Ghoul (miniseries) (2018)
- Tumbbad (2018)
- 72 Hours: Martyr Who Never Died (2019)
- Sonchiriya (2019)
- Arjun Patiala (2019)
- Any How Mitti Pao (2023)
- Demons (2024)
- The Missing Cow (2024)

== Awards and honors ==
- In 2008 Gurpreet Dhuri received Rabindranath Tagore Scholarship sponsored by late Mrs. Amita Mundra from Lalit Kala Akademi Chandigarh
- 2008 Indo-Swiss Friendship Art Exhibition, Government Museum and Art Gallery, Chandigarh

== Style themes and influences ==
Dhuri and his fellow artists started a prosthetic makeup and sculpture studio in Chandigarh. He draws significant inspiration from Stan Winston, a legendary figure in special effects known for his work on films like Jurassic Park and Edward Scissorhands. Winston’s groundbreaking ability to create lifelike creatures and characters through prosthetics and special effects deeply influenced Dhuri. He is also inspired by painter R. M. Singh.
