= Maddoke =

- village
- Location in Punjab, India
- Coordinates: 30.755131°N 75.323521°E
- Country: India
- State: Punjab

Languages
  - Official: Punjabi
- Time zone: UTC+5:30 (IST)

The village of Maddoke is between the cities of Moga and Jagraon, India, 7 km. from Ajitwal. The sixth Sikh Guru, Guru Hargobind, visited it. A five story building built in his memory.

The population in the 1991 census was 2380, and the area is 570 hectares.
