= Bareta =

- city
- Location in Punjab, India Bareta (India)
- Coordinates: 29.87000°N 75.70000°E
- Country: India
- State: Punjab
- Region: Punjab
- District: Mansa

Population (2011)Census of India, 2011
  - Total: 17,432

Languages
  - Official: Punjabi
  - Regional: Puadhi
- Time zone: UTC+5:30 (IST)
- PIN: 151501
- Telephone code: 01652
- Vehicle registration: PB-50

Bareta is a city and municipal council in the Mansa district in Southern Punjab, India. It is a small town that lies on the Famous people include Nand Singh, a soldier in WW2

== History ==
Bareta is a small town in the southern part of the Indian state of Punjab. It is believed to be founded by Chauhan Rajputs 600 years ago, who resettled in area from Ganganagar area of Rajasthan. They were initially employed by Jalla Ranghar of nearby village Jalwera. Later on Chauhans established direct links with Delhi Kingdoms. Bareta got its name from a warrior Rajput "Bad-beta "who was marshall swordsman and fighter.He carved his own constituency of 13000 acres. Three more villages got established by his descendants i.e. Dyalpura, Bahadarpur, Kulrian .All five villages have Chauhan surname population who have now converted to Sikhism.

There is an old building of "Agrawal Dharmashala" here. Now there is Bareta town developing near the Bareta village. This small town comes under the Bathinda Lok Sabha constituency.

Despite being a very small town in terms of infrastructure & resources, people of this town have pursued higher education and are working in the fields of health, engineering, administration.

== Geography ==
Bareta is located in the Mansa district in southern part of Indian Punjab at 29°52′12″N 74°42′00″E It lies on Delhi - Ferozpur Railway track (via Bathinda)

Distances from major towns: From Chandigarh = 170 km, From Patiala = 100 km, From Bathinda = 100 km, From Delhi = 215 (by rail), 260(by road),

Townships are being developed in Bareta which have been designed with urban planning and have good facilities. Following are main townships, also known as colonies: 1. The Bareta Cooperative House Building Society, also known as Mulazam Colony (at Bareta-Budhlada Main Road) 2. Aggarwal Colony (Behind Police Station Bareta) 3. Municipal Colony (Near BMD School, Bareta 4. Astha Colony (On Dyalpura Road) 5.Aggarsain colony near Greenland schoolBareta

== Demographics ==
As per Census of India conducted in 2001, Bareta had a population of 14,886. Males constitute 53% of the population and females 47%. Bareta has an average literacy rate of 56%, lower than the national average of 59.5%; with 59% of the males and 41% of females literate. 14% of the population is under 6 years of age. Bareta is Municipal Council having area of 4 km^{2}.

== Education and economy ==
The city has Milkha Singh Educational Institute situated on the Budhlada road. Students from the city are well placed in the fields of Engineering, IT, Banking, Pharmacy etc..

List of Schools:

- Govt Senior Secondary School
- BMD High School (Punjabi Medium - PSEB)
- DAV Public School (English Medium - CBSE)
- Greenland Day Boarding Public School (English Medium- CBSE)
- Atma Ram Memorial School (English Medium - CBSE)
- Arya Public School (Punjabi Medium - PSEB)
- Adarsh Senior Secondary School (Punjabi Medium - PSEB)
- Mata Gurdev kaur College Of B .Ed
- Arihant College Of Education for B .Ed
- University College Bahadurpur (GOVT.)

In addition, a co-educational Government Polytechnic College was established in Bareta to provide post-secondary technical education, expanding access for students from the surrounding rural areas.

== Industry and occupation ==
This area is not well developed in industrial sector. It mainly contains rice milling and cotton factories. A large part of the residents here are engaged in government jobs, mainly in Education and Banking. Other small scale industries include leather. The local shoe makers produce good quality shoes, popularly known as "Punjabi Jutti" But now government is bringing new projects also. A thermal plant of 1350 MW is being established in Bareta (Vill. Gobindpura) by private sector company.
