= Randeep Maddoke =

Indian photographer and documentary maker (born 1977)

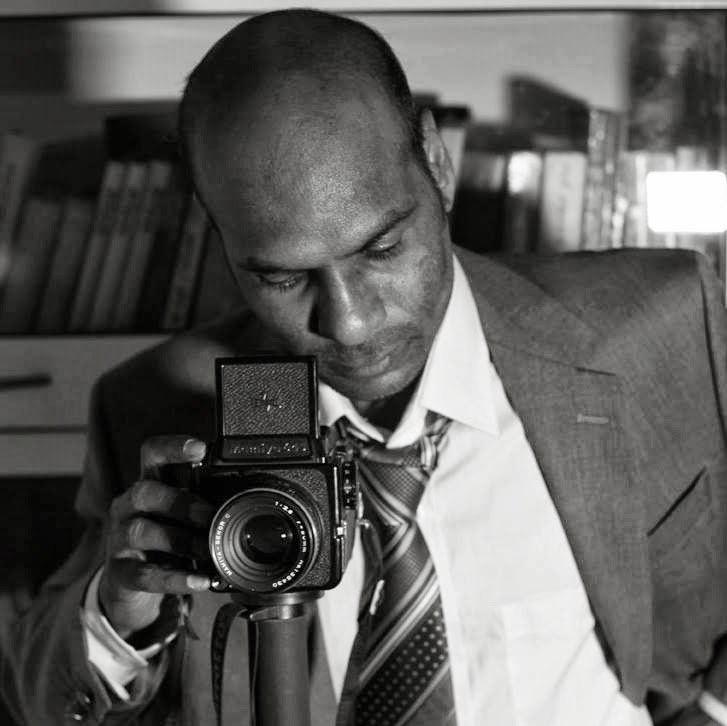
- Born: Randeep Singh; 10 January 1977 (age 49); Maddoke, Punjab, India
- Education: Government College of Arts, Chandigarh
- Known for: Photography, Photojournalism
- Notable work: Landless (Documentary Film)
- Father: Bagh Singh
- Patrons: Zindabad Trust, Punjab Lalit Kala Academy

Randeep Maddoke is a Punjab-based concept photographer and documentary filmmaker, born and raised in the village Maddoke, Moga (Punjab). Randeep, an activist turned photographer, is known for his focus on the pains of the marginalised sections of society which are constantly subject to a systematic social exclusion.

He completed his studies from Government College of Arts, Chandigarh with specialization in Graphics (Printmaking). He documented the class struggle of Dalits in Punjab, Haryana, and Tamil Nadu to study the practice and effects of caste. In 2008 he went to Nepal to document the making of the democratic Republic out of the monarchical Nepal. There too he located the threads of casteism and the resistance thereof. He made a documentary film Landless about caste based discrimination, communal violence in Punjab.

== Life ==
=== Early life ===
Randeep has grown up in a Dalit Landless family of village Maddoke, in Moga district of Punjab, where he started drawing and sending these artworks to the literary and art festivals organized by radical left groups. Here he got appreciation and encouragement that drove him to work more in the art field. As an activist Randeep traveled by bicycle from village to village to organize meetings on agricultural labor and farmers’ rights. He also joined a theatre group. He could only study up to class 12 due to poor financial conditions of his family. Having quit the further studies in 2004, he did what most of the boys with similar family backgrounds did -working as an agriculture laborer, daily wager in town or as a wall-painter in house construction.

=== Education and work ===
Despite the struggle to earn a living he kept on looking for avenues to express through art. Over a period of time, Randeep found an advertisement in a newspaper about admission into the Government College of Arts, Chandigarh. At the age of thirty and an eight years into union activism, he decided to appear in the entrance examination and eventually he got admission in this institution. To continue his studies in this college he sold a part of the land from his family property. Thus he began his study in BFA with Graphic Print course from the given options and he chose photography as an additional subject. To practice photography he borrowed a camera from an activist friend. Spent four years in this institute finally, he graduated from the college. During this, he realised that his main interest was in photography. So he decided to go ahead with photography as a profession as well as a way to express his ideas. He got a job as Photojournalist in Haryana Review (under Public Relations & Information Department, State Government of Haryana), Chandigarh (April 2008 to April 2014). In 2010, Randeep made a short documentary film ‘Meri Pehchan’ produced by Directorate of Census Operations, Government of Haryana, (18 minutes).

== Filmography ==
- Meri Pehchan (2010) (documentary)
- Landless (documentary)

== Awards ==
- 2007 First prize in Photography Exhibition ‘Chandigarh in April’ Organized by Chandigarh Tourism.
- 2011 Group show on ‘World Photography Day’ at Punjab Kala Bhawan, Chandigarh.
- 2012 Annual Art Exhibition Award, Chandigarh Lalit Kala Akademi (State Fine Art Academy), Chandigarh.

== Exhibitions ==
- 2009 Group show ‘Jugnu Mela’ organized by People for Animals(PFA) at Taj Chandigarh.
- 2014 A solo exhibition ‘Sculpted Moments’ at Alliance Française de Chandigarh.
- 2015 Digital Display in International Exposure Awards held in Paris, France.
- 2014 A solo exhibition ‘Chandigarh Through my Heart’ at Government Museum and Art Gallery, Chandigarh.
- 2012 Group show ‘Untitled’ at Punjab Kala Bhawan, Chandigarh.
- 2011 Group show on ‘World Photography Day’ at Punjab Kala Bhawan, Chandigarh.
- 2009 A solo exhibition ‘Chandigarh Through My Heart’ at Alliance Française de Chandigarh.
- 2006 Exhibition as a member of International Artist's Group ‘Flux Asia’ held at Fine Art Museum, Punjab University, Chandigarh.

== Fellowships ==
- 2011 Awarded Junior Fellowship to Outstanding Person in the Field of Culture for the project titled "Known and Unknown Landmarks of Punjab" by Ministry of Culture, Government of India, New Delhi.
- 2013 Awarded Sohan Qadri Fellowship for the photography project titled "Paradox of Prosperity" by Chandigarh Lalit Kala Akademi (State fine art academy), Chandigarh.
- 2019 Awarded grant by Zindabad Trust for Documentary film titled "Landless", New Delhi.
