= Dhanraj Bhagat =

Indian sculptor (1917–1988)

- Born: 1917; Lahore, British India
- Died: 1988 (aged 70–71)
- Occupation: Sculptor
- Notable work: The kiss; the king; flute player; sitar player; cosmic man; monarch series; Shiva dance
- Awards: Padma Shri; Lalit Kala Akademi Award; Delhi Sahitya Kala Parishad Award; Academy of Fine Arts, Kolkata Gold Medal; Bombay Art Society Award
- Website: Official website

Dhanraj Bhagat (1917–1988) was an Indian sculptor, considered by many as one of the major sculptors of the Indian subcontinent. He was born in 1917 in Lahore, in the erstwhile British India and secured a diploma in sculpture from the National College of Arts (formerly known as Mayo School of Art), Lahore. His career started as a member of the faculty at the College of Art, Delhi in 1947 where he rose to the position of the head of the Sculpture Department by the time of his retirement in 1977.

Bhagat participated in the first three Triennales staged in India, The All India Sculpture Exhibition in 1954 and many exhibitions held at galleries such as Bombay Art Society, the Academy of Fine Arts, Kolkata, and the All India Fine Arts and Crafts Society, New Delhi. The Lalit Kala Akademi hosted a retrospective of Bhagat in 1978 and his works are exhibited at the National Gallery of Modern Art, among other art galleries. Though he worked on several media like papier-mache, aluminium, copper and stone, most of his known works are in wood and is characterized by their geometric shapes. He also produced many drawings towards the later part of his life.

Bhagat was the first prize winner at two art competitions conducted by Punjab Fine Arts Society, Lahore in 1937 and 1945 and he won the first prize at two more competitions by All India Fine Arts and Crafts Society in 1947 and 1949. He received the Bombay Art Society award twice, in 1948 and 1949, and the Gold Medal from Academy of Fine Arts, Kolkata in 1948. Lalit Kala Akademi, New Delhi awarded him their national honour in 1961 and he received the state award from the Sahitya Kala Parishad, Delhi in 1969. He was awarded the fourth highest Indian civilian honour of Padma Shri by the Government of India in 1977.

Dhanraj Bhagat died in 1988 at the age of 71. The Government College of Art, Chandigarh, an offshoot of the former Mayo School of Art where Bhagat did his art training, established a sculpture park at its premises in 2010, named after the alumni. Some of Bhagat's works are on display at Government Museum, Chandigarh.

== See also ==
- National College of Arts, Lahore
- College of Art, Delhi
