= Alka Pande =

Indian academic, author and museum curator

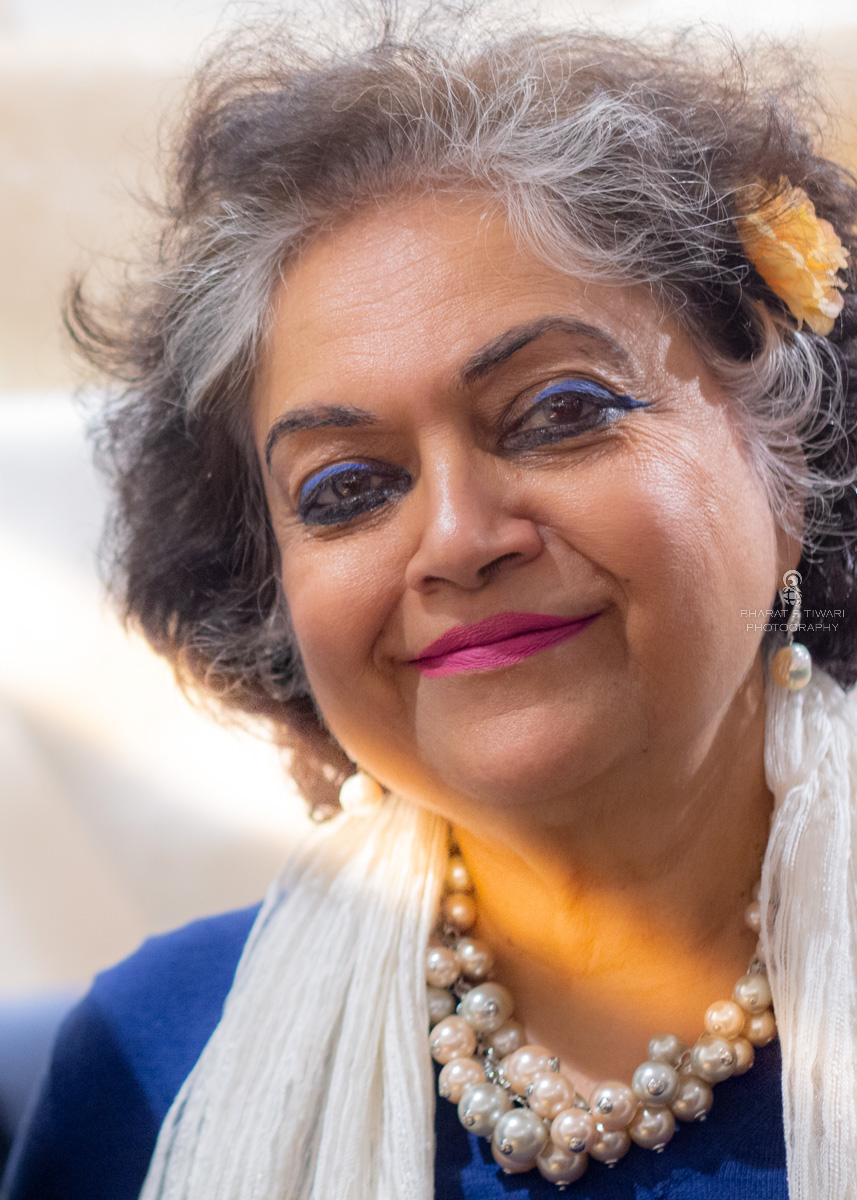
- Alka Pande

Alka Pande (born 1956) is an Indian academic, author and museum curator.

== Background ==
Alka Pande was born in Kolkata in 1956. She went to Convent of Jesus and Mary School, New Delhi until the 8th and then completed her class 9th to 12th in St. Mary's Convent School, Kanpur, ICS (1972).

Pande did her double MA in History of Art from Bombay University in 1981 and Panjab University in 1983. In 1996, she was Awarded a Phd in Art History from the Panjab University. Pande's thesis was on the Study of Ardhanarisvara in Indian Art, with special reference to Indian Sculpture. In 1999, she further did her Post Doctoral Degree from Goldsmiths College, University of London, under the Aegis of the Charles Wallace Fellowship, through the British Council.

== Career ==
Pande has been a reader at the Department of Fine Arts, Panjab University, Chandigarh from 1996 till 2000 and before that she was the Director of the Museum of Fine Arts, Panjab University, Chandigarh.

2000–present: She is currently working as Art Consultant at the India Habitat Centre, New Delhi. Pande is also the visiting faculty of DJ Academy of Design, Coimbatore, Tamil Nadu.

== Curated shows ==
- In 2015 and 2016: 'Art in the Metro', an ongoing initiative by India Habitat Centre and Delhi Metro at Jor Bagh and Mandi House Metro Stations in New Delhi
- In October 2014, Pande curated The Kama-Sutra : spirituality and erotism in Indian art at Pinacothèque de Paris. This was alongside Marc Restellini, director of the Pinacothèque de Paris. The show was on till 10 January 2015.
- In March 2014, Pande was the guest curator for the Sculpture Gallery at the City Palace, Udaipur. The show ‘Diving Gesture - The Magnificence of Mewar Spirituality’ was organised by the Maharana of Mewar Charitable Foundation (MMCF), Udaipur, in association with UNESCO, New Delhi.
- In 2011, she co-curated the Delhi Photo Festival, a biennial photography festival organized by India Habitat Centre (IHC) and Nazar Foundation in Delhi
- Curator of "India Awakens. Under the Banyan Tree" from November 2010 –February 2011 Essl Museum, Klosterneuburg near Vienna, Austria. This was part of the emerging artists series by bringing in 34 selected artists.

== Books ==
- 108 Portraits of Indian Culture and Heritage, 14-volume encyclopedia, Artshila Trust, 2024
- Voices and Images, Penguin Enterprise, November 2015.
- Mukhwas Indian Food Through the Ages, Imprint, 2013
- Shringara – the many faces of Indian beauty, Year of publishing: 2011
- Leela – An Erotic Play of Verse and Art, Published by HarperCollins 2009
- Kama Sutra - The Quest for Love Published by Brijbasi Art Press 2008
- Ardhanarishvara the androgyne Published by Rupa & Co., 2005
- Masterpiece Of Indian Art Published by Lustre Press, Roli Books, 2004
- A Celebration of Love Article : Myriad Moods of Love, by Alka Pande - Published by Roli Books, 2004
- Indian Erotic Art - Published by Roli Books, 2002
- Folk Music & Musical Instruments of Punjab Dr. Alka Pande - Published by Mapin Publishing, Ahmedabad, 2002
- Indian Erotica Alka Pande & Lance Dane - Published by Roli Books, 2002
- Kama Sutra Introduction by Dr. Alka Pande - Published by Roli Books, 1999

== Awards ==
- In 2006, Pande was Awarded the Chevalier dans l'Ordre des Arts et des Lettres - Knight of the Order of Arts and Letters, bequeathed by the French government.
- In 2009, Pande received the Australian Asia Council Special Award
- In 2015, Pande was awarded the Chandigarh Lalit Kala Akademi honours - in recognition of the distinguished contribution to art - with Amrita Sher-Gil Samman
- On 23 March 2015 Alka Pande was awarded L’Oréal Paris Femina Women Awards 2015 under Design and Arts
