= R. M. Singh =

Indian painter, illustrator, and teacher

R M Singh
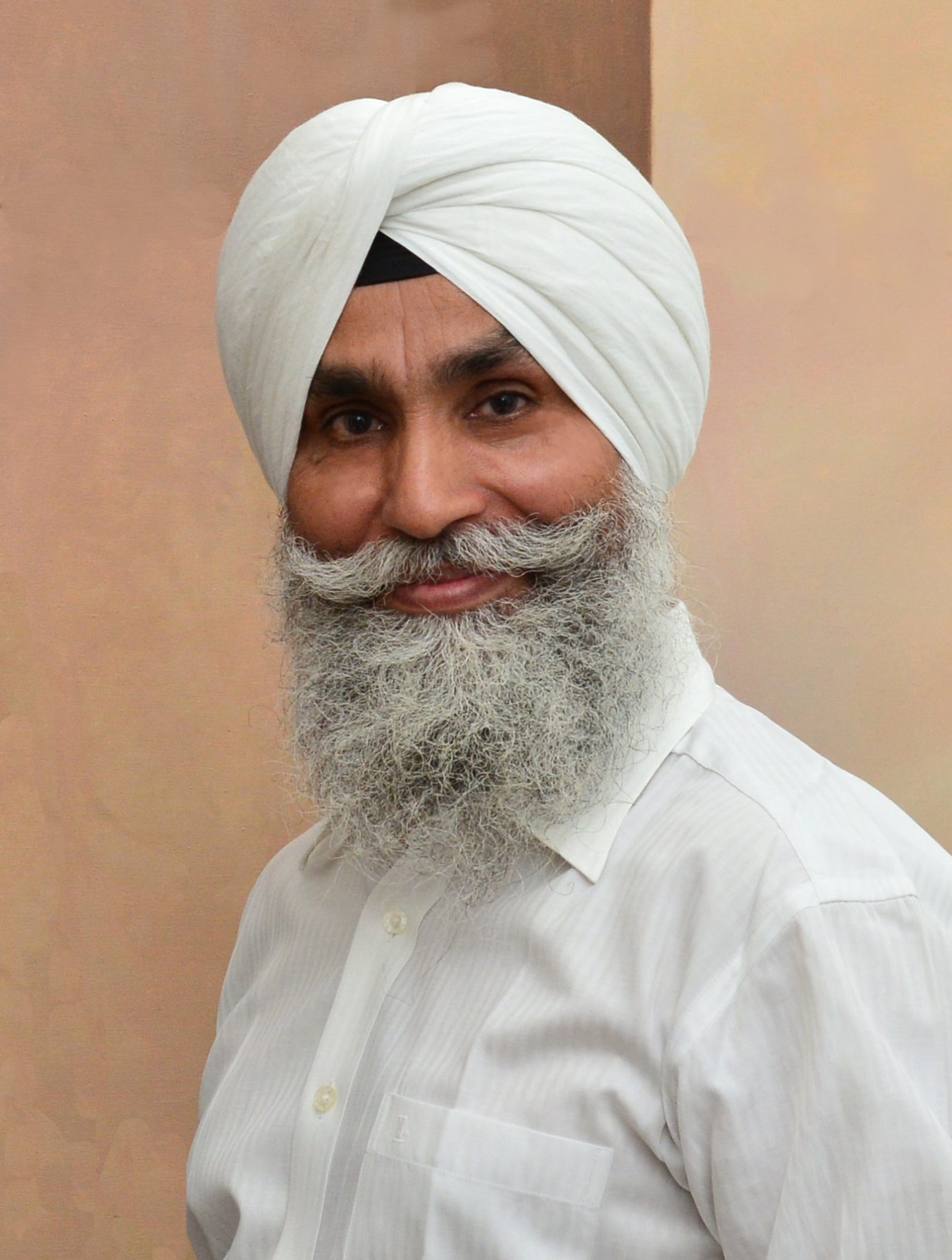
- Born: Mohinder Singh; May 9, 1965 (age 61); Baroli Kalan
- Education: Graduation in Fine Art
- Alma mater: Government College of Arts, Chandigarh
- Known for: Portraiture and Sikh Paintings
- Style: Realist Art
- Elected: Secretary Punjab Lalit Kala Akademi (State Academy of Fine Art, Punjab), 2010
- Website: www.rmsingh.com

Rahi Mohinder Singh better known as RM Singh, is a Punjabi-speaking Indian painter, illustrator, and teacher. He studied under artist Sobha Singh. He has painted many men and women of importance and his portraits have been exhibited the Parliament of India and the President House of India.

== Early life and education ==
Rahi Mohinder Singh started schooling at a government primary school in his native village Bharoli Kalan, distt. Pathankot, Punjab, India. Later, he went to a nearby town Pathankot for high school. He started painting in oil colours when he was in 7th standard. The very first painting, he recalls painting was a landscape on waste piece of plywood tea leave container box. He was introduced to canvas painting, later. In 1983, he got a chance to meet renowned artist Sobha Singh (painter) at Andretta, Himachal Pradesh. RM Singh remained a lifelong follower of Sobha Singh's works. Soon he became a child prodigy known for his art works among local art lover families of Pathankot. He participated in an exhibition, which was organised by a local convent school, where he sold off all his displayed works. For his further studies in art he went to New Delhi but finding the Delhi atmosphere not much to his taste, he returned and tried at Government College of Arts, Chandigarh. He completed his graduation in Fine Arts from this institute.

== Works and style ==
RM Singh is known for working with a wide spectrum of genres of painting. Painting landscapes is rather easy for him, but, where he finds the actual challenge to his sense of aesthetics and the grip over the medium is the genre of portraiture. He recognizes a deeply entrenched realism in himself as he says that the portrait cannot be simply 'like' someone, it should 'be' someone.

== Portraits ==
In 1994, he was commissioned by the War Museum in Ludhiana to paint portraits of the war heroes of Punjab.

He made 40 portraits of writers and artists of Punjab for Punjab Kala Bhawan, Chandigarh.

At Shabad Parkash Museum, Rakba, Ludhiana, Punjab, he painted portraits of the 36 writers of Guru Granth Sahib. He also painted the "Inauguration Ceremony of The Holy Guru Granth Sahib ji" which portrays Baba Buddha ji opening the holy scripture for the public.

Singh has painted portraits of Giani Gurmukh Singh Musafir and Shivraj Patil. Both portraits are displayed at Lok Sabha Gallery at the Parliament of India. In 2012 and 2016, respectively, he painted portraits of Pratibadevi Singh Patil and Pranab Mukhraji. Both portraits are displayed at the Rashtrapati Bhavan (president's residence) in New Delhi.
