= Punjab Lalit Kala Akademi =

Coordinates: 30°44′53.8″N 76°46′54.3″E

- Formation: 5 August 1966; 59 years ago
- Founder: M. S. Randhawa
- Headquarters: Punjab Arts Council, Chandigarh
- Location: Chandigarh, India
- Region served: India
- Fields: Fine arts and Culture
- Official language: English, Punjabi
- President: Diwan Manna
- Parent organisation: Government of India
- Website: lalitkalaakademipunjab.com

The Punjab Lalit Kala Akademi is Punjab's state academy of fine arts. It's an autonomous cultural organisation established and funded by the Government of Punjab to preserve and publicize the fine art and culture outside the state.

== History ==
Punjab Lalit Kala Akademi was founded in 1966. The Akademi was set up by the Government of Punjab to promote the associations and development of such collaborative efforts among the artists of Punjab state.

In the year 1980 Akademi got recognition in the entire Northern India and for the first time Akademi organised the exhibition of Photography and Sculpture, Akademi also announced to grant awards of Rs. 13,500/- with certification to the participants. Akademi purchased the works from the artists displayed at the exhibitions in Chandigarh and sponsored an exhibition of All India Fine Arts and Crafts Society

== Art gallery ==
Punjab Lalit Kala Akademi Gallery is located in the building.

== Publications ==
It has also decided to foster the publications on art literature including monographs, journals, art- albums etc. An art library was also established and equipped with books and journals on Indian and International art with intention to provide assets for future generations.
