= Manghera =

Manghera Pannu
- village
- Location in Haryana, India Manghera (India)
- Coordinates: 29.636525°N 75.700698°E
- Country: India
- State: Haryana
- District: Fatehabad

Government
  - Type: Democracy

Population
  - Total: 1,177

Languages
  - Official: Hindi language, Punjabi, Haryanvi
- Time zone: UTC+5:30 (IST)
- PIN: 125106 (Dharsul Kalan)
- Telephone code: 01692
- ISO 3166 code: IN-HR
- Vehicle registration: HR,23
- Nearest city = kullan: Fatehabad
- Sex ratio: 631:546 ♂/♀
- Lok Sabha constituency: Fatehabad and Adampur
- Website: haryana.gov.in

Manghera is a village in Fatehabad District, Haryana. It is 21.2 kilometers from the main town of Tohana, 40 kilometers from Fatehabad, and 161 km from the state capital, Chandigarh.

== Neighbouring Villages ==
Village	Distance (in km)
Laherian	2.5 km
Nanheri	4.5 km
Kunal	5 km
Tibbi	5.8 km
Dharsul Khurd	6.2 km
Bhuna	0.2 km
Ratia	14.2 km
Jakhal	18.7 km
Tohana	21.2 km
Amani	
Baliawala	
Bhemewala	
Chander Kalan	
Chander Khurd	
Chelewal	
Bosti	

== Schools in Manghera ==
- Government primary school Manghera

== Colleges nearby Manghera ==
- Apex polytechnic college
- Surya College of Education
- JBRD College, Uklana
