= Talwari =

- Village
- Location in Haryana, India
- Coordinates: 29.78914°N 75.79218°E
- Country: India
- State: Haryana
- District: Fatehabad

Government
  - Type: Village Council
  - Body: Gram Panchayat
- Elevation: 232 m (761 ft)

Population (2011)
  - Total: 1,504

Languages
  - Official: Punjabi, Hindi, Bagri
- Time zone: UTC+5:30 (IST)
- PIN: 125133
- Telephone code: +01749
- Vehicle registration: HR 23

Talwari is a village in Jakhal Tehsil of Fatehabad District of the state of Haryana, India. It belongs to Hisar Division.

The places like Sadhanwas (2 km), Jakhal (3 km), Jakhal Mandi are the nearby to Talwari. Talwari is surrounded by Tohana Tehsil towards South, Lehragaga Tehsil towards North, Andana Tehsil towards East, Budhlada Tehsil towards west. Talwari Pin code is 125133 and postal head office is Jakhal Mandi . This Place is in the border of the Fatehabad District and Sangrur District. Sangrur District is North towards this place . It is near to the Punjab State Border.

== Demographics ==
Talwari's total population is 1504 and number of houses is 277. Female population is 48.3%. Village literacy rate is 50.5% and the female literacy rate is 20.7%.
