= Barseen =

Barseen Barsin
- Village
- Location in Haryana, India Barseen (India)
- Coordinates: 29°30′17.7″N 75°29′59.5″E
- Country: India
- State: Haryana
- District: Fatehabad

Government
  - Type: Sarpanch

Population
  - Total: 4,500

Languages
  - Official: Hindi
- Time zone: UTC+5:30 (IST)
- PIN: 125050
- ISO 3166 code: IN-HR
- Vehicle registration: HR 22
- Fatehabad: Fatehabad
- Website: haryana.gov.in

Barseen also spelled as Barsin, is a village near the City of Fatehabad, Haryana (India). It belongs to District and Tehsil Fatehabad, Hissar division of Haryana. It is located on Bhuna road and is 5 km from National Highway 10 (NH10) and Fatehabad city. It is 217 km away from Haryana State capital Chandigarh and 228 km from national capital New Delhi. It is close to the Punjab state border.

The famous archaeological site called Banawali of Indus Valley civilization (Harappan culture) 2400-2900 BC, is only 21 km from this village. Also, it is 28 km away from famous historical and tourist place called Agroha.

The village is headed by Sarpanch, who is elected for five years along with other Gram Panchayat members.

== Languages ==
Punjabi, Hindi and Bagri are the local languages of this village.

== Geography ==
The village is located on the western side of Haryana state of Northern India. This village and surrounding area has not experience any significant earthquake. Occasionally, floods are caused due to heavy rain water.

Barseen is surrounded by Bhattu Kalan from South, Ratia Tehsil from North, and Bhuna from East. The cities Hissar, Fatehabad, Ratia and Sirsa are within 50 km range from Barseen.

== Climate ==
The climate in the village and surrounding areas includes, hot summer and cool winter. Sometimes, temperature is in extreme with dryness and occasionally, dust storms are experienced during summer months.

== Local government ==
Gram Panchayat

(Sarpanch and Members Panchayat)
