= Phullan =

Phullan Phoolan
- Village
- Nickname: Fullan
- Location in Haryana, India Phullan (India)
- Coordinates: 29.624989°N 75.5136037°E
- Country: India
- State: Haryana
- District: Fatehabad

Languages
  - Official: Hindi
- Time zone: UTC+5:30 (IST)
- Telephone code: 125051
- ISO 3166 code: IN-HR
- Vehicle registration: HR
- Nearest city: Fatehabad
- Website: haryana.gov.in

Phullan, India is a small village that is located between Ratia and Fatehabad established around 1860–1870. The population of Phullan is around 7800–8000. It is approximately 18 km from Fatehabad and 10 km from Ratia. The population includes many Jat gotras, such as the Sihag, Thalor, Godara, Babal, Maiya, Dahiya, Manglauda, Karwasra, Garhwal, Fageria, Jewliya, Jangra, Jhajhra, Dhaka, Dheru, Tandi, Jhakar, koont and Mehla. Harijan, Nayak are among the backward classes living in the village.

The village got its name "Phullan" from the flowers which were present at the entrance of the village.

== See also ==
- List of villages in Fatehabad district
