= Baari (film) =

2015 Indian short film

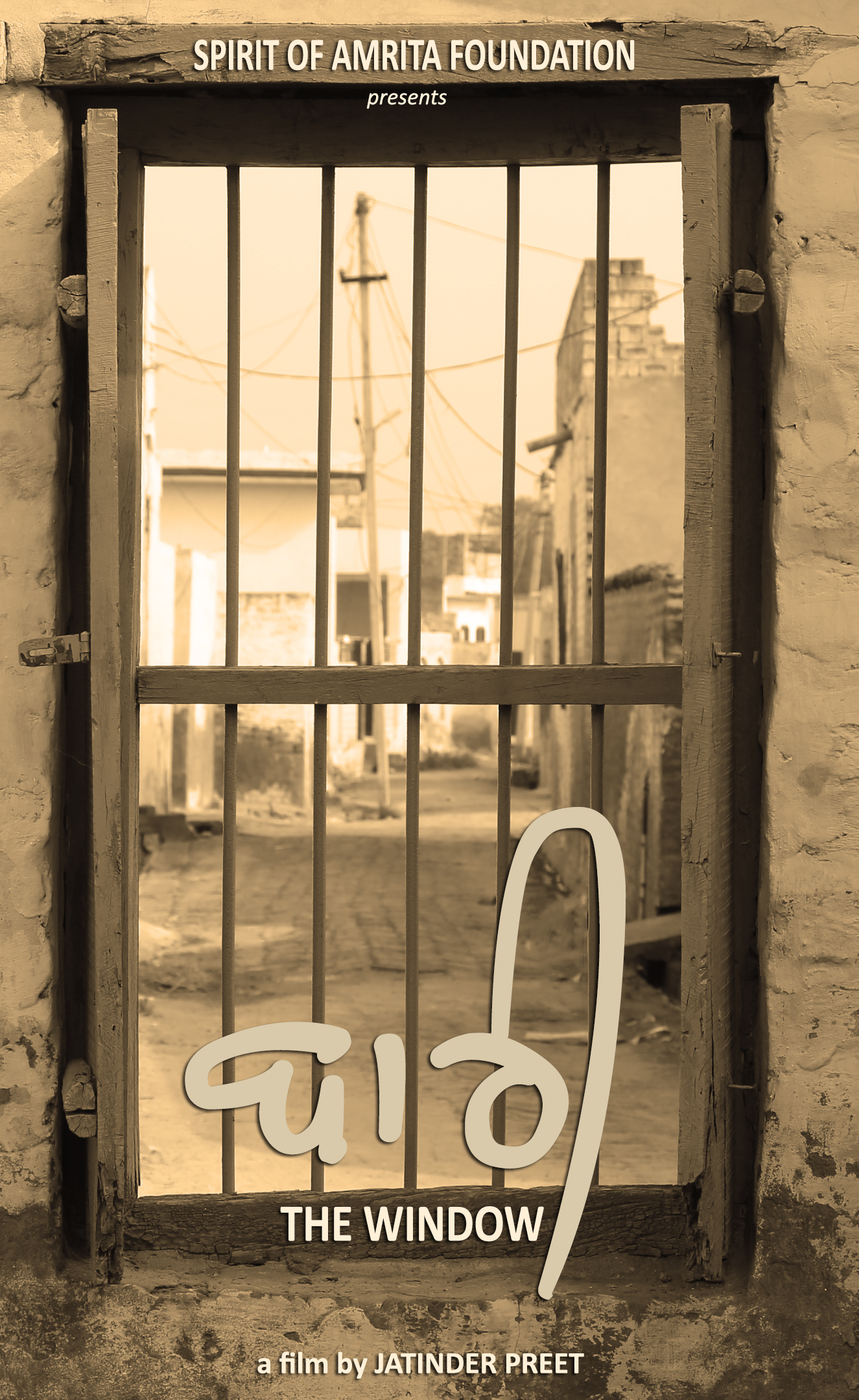
- Directed by: Jatinder Preet
- Screenplay by: Balram
- Produced by: Iqbal Lahar
- Starring: Raj Dhaliwal, Hardarshan, Jagmel Singh
- Cinematography: Parminder Singh
- Edited by: Deepak Garg
- Release date: 16 April 2015
- Running time: 24 minutes
- Country: India
- Language: Punjabi

Baari (Punjabi: ਬਾਰੀ) is a 2015 Punjabi language Indian short film, directed by Jatinder Preet, a journalist turned filmmaker. Baari had its world premiere at International Film Festival of South Asia in Toronto, Canada in April 2015. It has also been shown at Imagineindia International Film Festival in Madrid, Spain.

Real life farmers and locals from village Changaliwal of Lehragaga in Sangrur district have played different roles in the film highlighting the plight of the widows left behind by the debt-ridden farmers who commit suicide.

== Plot ==
The story of the film is set in rural Punjab, a province in India known to have been the bread basket of the country, but now facing fallout of severe agrarian crisis. While men are addicted to drugs, women have been forced to look out for sustenance elsewhere. Some women in the village have started going to the nearby towns about whom the villagers make insinuating remarks. It's night and a woman, the central character in the film, who remains unnamed, is unable to sleep. She recounts her recent past from the time she came to that house as a newly-wedded bride. Her first husband, a small-time farmer, committed suicide and she was remarried to her brother in law, Bhola, a cripple and a drug-addict. Failing to cope with mounting debts he too ended his life consuming pesticide. Having watched them die one after the other, she is the one left to look for the rest of the family, consisting of her young daughter and infirm father in law. Spending the whole night awake she finally arrives at a decision. The woman who has so far seen decisions being taken for her by others only, decides to take things in her own hands and fight on. As another day comes up she announces to her father in law that she is going to town. She steps out of her home all prepared to face the challenges of life anew.

== Cast ==
- Raj Dhaliwal as central woman character
- Hardarshan as Bhola, her second husband
- Jagmel Singh as father-in-law
- Navdeep as first husband
- Pirthipal as Moneylender
- Ashok Garg as moneylender's assistant
- Veerpal Kaur as her daughter
- Chinto as a woman in the mourning and wedding scenes
- Gurmel Khokhar as first man in the mourning scene
- Bihari Mander as second man in the mourning scene

== Production ==
This is the debut film of the director Jatinder Preet, also known as Jaypee. The story of the film was developed during his visits with his partner Amrita Chaudhry to Lehragaga, a small town in Punjab that has witnessed a spate of farmer suicides over the past several years. The shooting for the film started in November 2014 and it was completed in four months under the banner Spirit of Amrita Foundation, formed after Chaudhary's death in a road accident in 2012. No professional actors were hired for the project and the film does not follow much of conventional cinematic devices, narrating the story in a very realistic manner. No background music has been used in the narrative with a realistic sound-design.
