= Burj, Fatehabad =

Burj
- Village
- Location in Haryana, India Burj (India)
- Coordinates: 29.618°N 75.645°E
- Country: India
- State: Haryana
- District: Fatehabad

Languages
  - Official: Hindi
- Time zone: UTC+5:30 (IST)
- ISO 3166 code: IN-HR
- Vehicle registration: HR
- Nearest city: Fatehabad
- Website: haryana.gov.in

Burj is a village and Indus Valley civilization archaeological site in the Fatehabad district of the Indian state of Haryana.
