= Balran =

- Village
- Location in Punjab, India
- Coordinates: 29.84303°N 75.84721°E
- Country: India
- State: Punjab
- District: Sangrur

Area
  - Total: 20.99 km^{2} (8.10 sq mi)
- Elevation: 227 m (745 ft)

Population (2001)
  - Total: 6,566
  - Density: 312.8/km^{2} (810.2/sq mi)

Languages
  - Official: Punjabi
- Time zone: UTC+5:30 (IST)
- Postal code: 148033
- Telephone code: +911676
- Vehicle registration: PB 64

Balran is a village of Sub division Moonak in Sangrur district in the state of Punjab, India. It is 54 km to the south of district headquarters Sangrur and 157 km from state capital Chandigarh. This village is near the border of the Sangrur district and Fatehabad district in state of Haryana.

== Geography ==
Balran is located at 29.84°N 75.85°E in Punjab border with Haryana state, India. It has an average elevation of 227 metres.

== Demographics ==
As of 2001 India census, Balran had a population of 6,566 in 1,111 households. The male population was 3,542 and female population was 3,022.
