= Sadhanwas =

- Village
- Location in Haryana, India
- Coordinates: 29.79300°N 75.76690°E
- Country: India
- State: Haryana
- District: Fatehabad

Government
  - Type: Village Council
  - Body: Gram Panchayat
- Elevation: 232 m (761 ft)

Population (2011)
  - Total: 4,103

Languages
  - Official: Punjabi, Hindi, Bagri
- Time zone: UTC+5:30 (IST)
- Postal code: 125133
- Telephone code: +01749
- Vehicle registration: HR 23

Sadhanwas is a village of Sub-division Jakhal in Fatehabad district in the state of Haryana, India. It is located 46 km towards East from District headquarters Fatehabad, 6 km from Jakhal Mandi, and 166 km from Chandigarh.

== Demographies ==
As per the Census 2011, the literacy rate of Sadhanwas is 64.1% . Thus Sadhanwas village has higher literacy rate compared to 59.2% of Fatehabad district. The male literacy rate is 70.06% and the female literacy rate is 57.82%.
