= Lakhmir Wala =

- Village
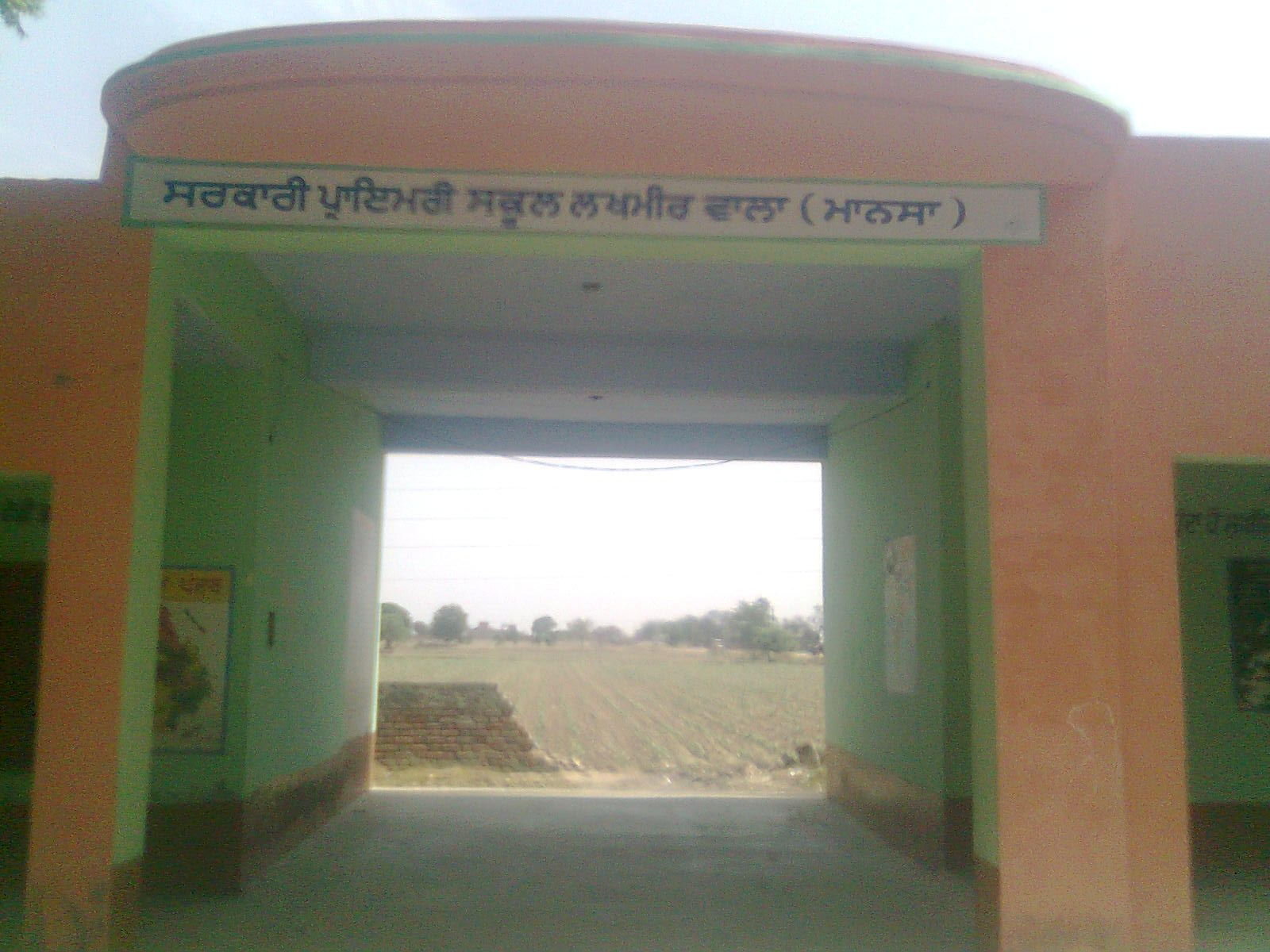
- A view of the local primary school

- Location in Punjab, India Lakhmir Wala (India)
- Coordinates: 29.860°N 75.393°E
- Country: India
- State: Punjab
- District: Mansa

Languages
  - Official: Punjabi
  - Regional: Punjabi
- Time zone: UTC+5:30 (IST)
- PIN: 151505
- Telephone code: 01659
- Nearest city: Jhunir

Lakhmir Wala (sometimes spelled Lakhmeerwala or Lakhmirwala) is a village in the Mansa district of Indian Punjab.

== Geography ==
It's centered approximately at 29°51′36″N 75°23′35″E, located at only 19 km from Mansa and 10 km from Jhunir. Chachohar, Kot Dharmu, Bhamme Khurd, Akkan Wali and Khiali Chehlan Wali are the nearby villages.

== History ==
Lakhmirwala is the site of archaeological remains belonging to the Harappan Civilization. (Note: Not to be confused with the Lakhmir Mound in Sind, Pakistan.) The Archaeological Survey of India has also conducted excavations at nearby Dhalewan that revealed Harappan Civilization finds. History of Lakhmirwala (District Mansa) The village Lakhmirwala was founded around the year 1830–1835 by Sardar Lakhmir Singh Brar. He, along with his family (descendants of Bhira), migrated from the old village Kot Dharmu and settled on a sandy, elevated mound toward the southwest. This new place was named “Lakhmirwala” after him. Over time, other Brar families from nearby areas and many farm laborers also migrated and settled here, which gradually led to the expansion of the village. Among the ancestors of Sardar Lakhmir Singh, Chaudhary Dilla Singh was a significant figure. Dilla Singh was a devoted disciple of Guru Gobind Singh Ji. After the Battle of Muktsar, when Guru Sahib came to the Malwa region, Dilla Singh, along with four companions, warmly welcomed him. He offered the Guru a prized horse and one and a quarter rupees as a gift and respectfully hosted him at his home. During this time, when Wazir Khan, the governor of Sirhind, issued an order for the Guru’s arrest, Dilla Singh refused to comply and said: "The Guru will stay with me, even if it costs me my life!" Seeing his pure devotion and service, Guru Sahib blessed him, saying: "Ask for whatever you desire." Dilla Singh humbly requested: "Our region is dry and sandy; please bless it with water so that people may prosper." Guru Sahib, blessing him, said: "This forested land will become fertile. Canals will flow here, trees will provide shade, and the land will yield wheat, barley, and rice in abundance." The descendants of Sardar Lakhmir Singh Brar still live in the village of Lakhmirwala today. This history is also recorded in the book “Pichhle Braran da Itihaas” by historian Dr. Balwant Singh (First edition: 1956, Second edition: 1986). ________________________________________ History of the Safoke Brars The Safoke Brars are descendants of Rao Brar. Rao Brar’s elder son Silhar had only one son, Sabo, who conquered most of the Bathinda region and established rule over the eastern jungles. In the First Battle of Panipat (1526), Sabo Brar supported Babur in his campaign. As a reward for his assistance, Babur granted him leadership over the jungle territory. In the fifth generation of the 18th century, Chaudhary Sabo founded the village of Talwandi. His son Bhago received the title “Bhalak” from Sher Shah Suri. Bhago had two sons: Bhalak Sito and Bhalak Nanu. Sito had two sons: Bhalak Bol and Bhalak Fazak. From Bol was born Chaudhary Sadhu Ji. Chaudhary Sadhu Ji had eight sons, among whom was Sardar Lakhmir Singh Brar. His brothers were: • Rajada Singh Brar • Ubba Singh Brar • Khana Singh Brar • Nind Singh Brar • Bimba Singh Brar • Ugind Singh Brar • Sohan Singh Brar Each of these brothers migrated and founded their own separate villages, which still exist today. Among them, Sardar Lakhmir Singh Brar laid the foundation of Lakhmirwala village. ________________________________________ Genealogy of Sardar Lakhmir Singh Brar 1. Gurdayal Singh Brar 2. His son: Sardar Budha Singh Brar 3. His son: Sardar Jai Singh Brar 4. His son: Partap Singh Brar 5. His son: Sardar Atar Singh Brar and Sardar Fateh Singh urf Keher and his son is Basant Singh. 6. His son: Sardar Hajoora Singh, Sardar Kapoor Singh, SardarKundha Singh, Sardar Sampuran Singh, Sardar Mall Singh, Sardar Puran Singh, Sardar Bakhshi Singh and Sardar This family still resides in Lakhmirwala village today.

Conclusion Thus, the foundation of Lakhmirwala, the genealogy of its founders, and the historical role of the Safoke Brars continue to be central to the identity and cultural heritage of the village.

== Culture ==
Punjabi is the mother tongue as well as the official language here. The Jatt clan of the village includes, Jagal, Chahal, Brar Sidhu Bhathal and Sandhu BHATTI.

=== Religion ===
By religion, the village is predominated by the Sikhs, the follower of Sikhism with Hindu and Muslim minorities. Among the ancestors of Sardar Lakhmir Singh, Chaudhary Dilla Singh was a significant figure. Dilla Singh was a devoted disciple of Guru Gobind Singh Ji. After the Battle of Muktsar, when Guru Sahib came to the Malwa region, Dilla Singh, along with four companions, warmly welcomed him. He offered the Guru a prized horse and one and a quarter rupees as a gift and respectfully hosted him at his home. During this time, when Wazir Khan, the governor of Sirhind, issued an order for the Guru’s arrest, Dilla Singh refused to comply and said: "The Guru will stay with me, even if it costs me my life!" Seeing his pure devotion and service, Guru Sahib blessed him, saying: "Ask for whatever you desire." Dilla Singh humbly requested: "Our region is dry and sandy; please bless it with water so that people may prosper." Guru Sahib, blessing him, said: "This forested land will become fertile. Canals will flow here, trees will provide shade, and the land will yield wheat, barley, and rice in abundance."

== Demographics ==
According to the 2001 census, the village has the total population of 1,584 with 280 households, 861 males and 723 females.

== Education ==
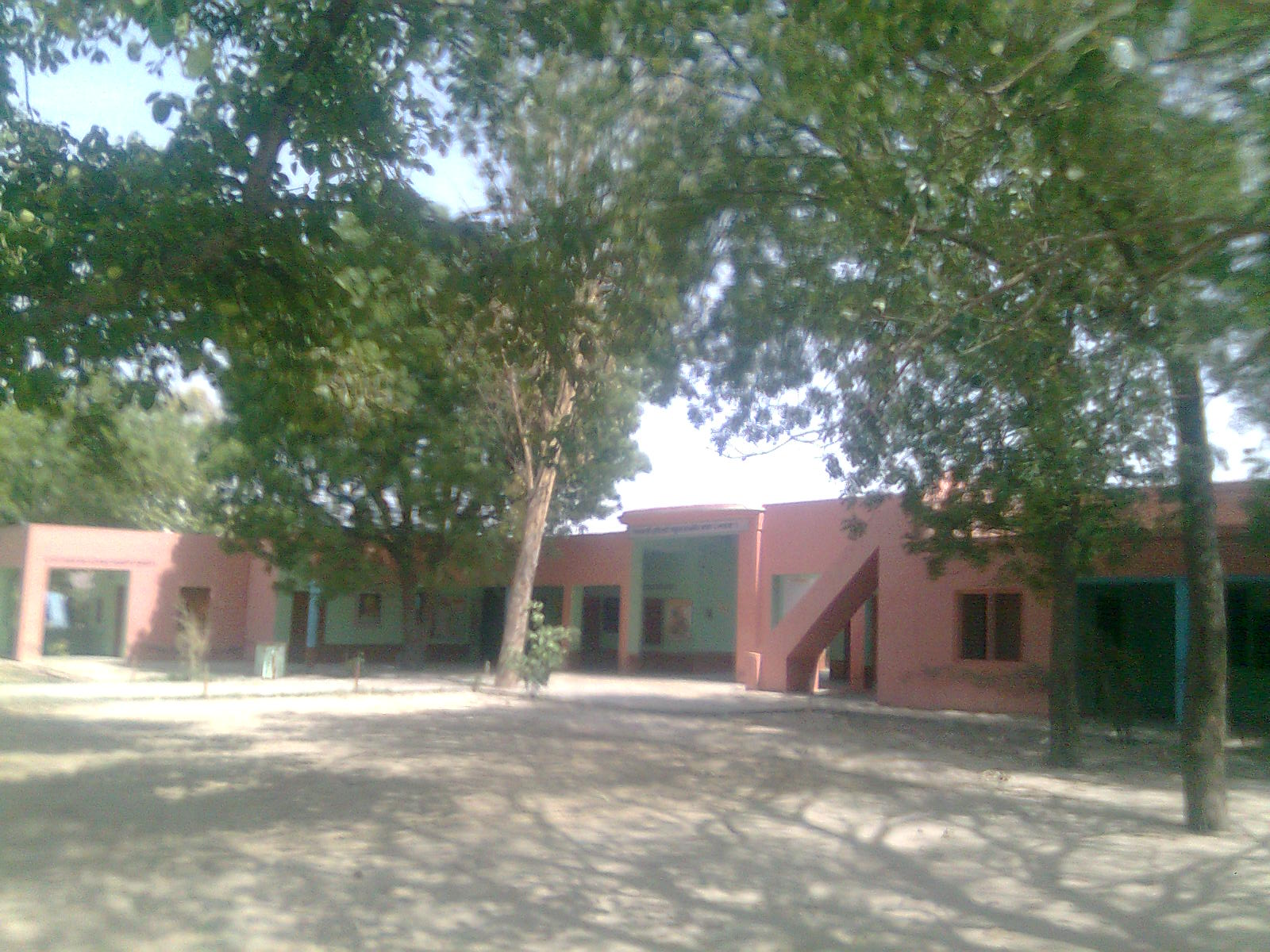
A view of the local Government Primary School

There is a government primary school (Note: Both pictures above, taken by Tari Buttar, is the proof itself) on the way to Chachohar.
