= Sidhani =

- Village
- Location in Haryana, India Sidhani (India)
- Coordinates: 29.796°N 75.731°E
- Country: India
- State: Haryana
- District: Fatehabad

Languages
  - Official: Hindi
- Time zone: UTC+5:30 (IST)
- ISO 3166 code: IN-HR
- Vehicle registration: HR
- Nearest city: Fatehabad
- Website: haryana.gov.in

Sidhani is a village situated on the Haryana-Punjab border in the Fatehabad district of Haryana state, India.
