= Khundan, Haryana =

Village in Haryana, India

Khundan
- village
- Interactive map of Khundan
- location in Haryana, India#Location in India Khundan (India)
- Coordinates: 29.6441536°N 75.3778429°E
- Country: India
- State: Haryana
- District: Fatehabad
- Tehsil: Ratia

Population (2011)
  - Total: 2,413

Languages
  - Regional: Punjabi, Hindi
- Time zone: UTC+5:30 (IST)
- Pin code: 125051
- Vehicle registration: HR59
- Nearest City: Ratia

Khundan is a village located in Nagpur block of Ratia Tehsil in Fatehabad district, Haryana, India.

== Demography ==
According to Indian Census 2011, There are total 478 families in the village. village has population of 2413 of which 1254 are males while 1159 are females. Literacy rate is 65.23 % as compared to 75.55 % of Haryana.
