= Ahlisadar =

- Village
- Location in Haryana, India Ahlisadar (India)
- Coordinates: 29°34′3″N 75°20′4″E
- Country: India
- State: Haryana
- District: Fatehabad

Languages
  - Official: Hindi
- Time zone: UTC+5:30 (IST)
- ISO 3166 code: IN-HR
- Vehicle registration: HR
- Nearest city: Fatehabad
- Website: haryana.gov.in

Ahlisadar is a resettlement village in Fatehabad district, Haryana, India. Two tornadoes were reported from the town in 2010; the first one, on the 22nd of July, damaged standing crops, touching down in rice paddy fields and staying in agricultural areas. The second one, on the 13th of August, caused no reported damage. A funnel was reported forming, but dissipated before it could reach the ground. Murrah buffaloes are raised by local ffarmers Ahli sadar 500 to 600 NRI Person
