= Rampura Jawaharwala =

- village
- Location in Punjab, India
- Coordinates: 29.89900°N 75.80275°E
- Country: India
- State: Punjab
- District: Sangrur

Area
  - Total: 3.94 km^{2} (1.52 sq mi)
- Elevation: 226 m (741 ft)

Population (2001)
  - Total: 1,272
  - Density: 323/km^{2} (836/sq mi)

Languages
  - Official: Punjabi
- Time zone: UTC+5:30 (IST)
- PIN: 148031
- Telephone code: 91-1676
- Vehicle registration: PB 75

Rampura Jawaharwala is a village located at 29.90°N 75.80°E, 9 km southeast of Lehragaga, in Sangrur district of the Punjab. It is 4 km from Lehra Gaga and 53 km from the district headquarters Sangrur.

== Geography ==
Rampura Jawaharwala (village) is situated on the Lehragaga to Moonak and Jakhal Link Road.

== Demographics ==
As of 2001 India census, the village had a population of 1272, of which 693 were males and 579 were females. There were 231 households. The village has a school, Government High School, Rampura Jawaharwala.
