= Borawal =

- Town
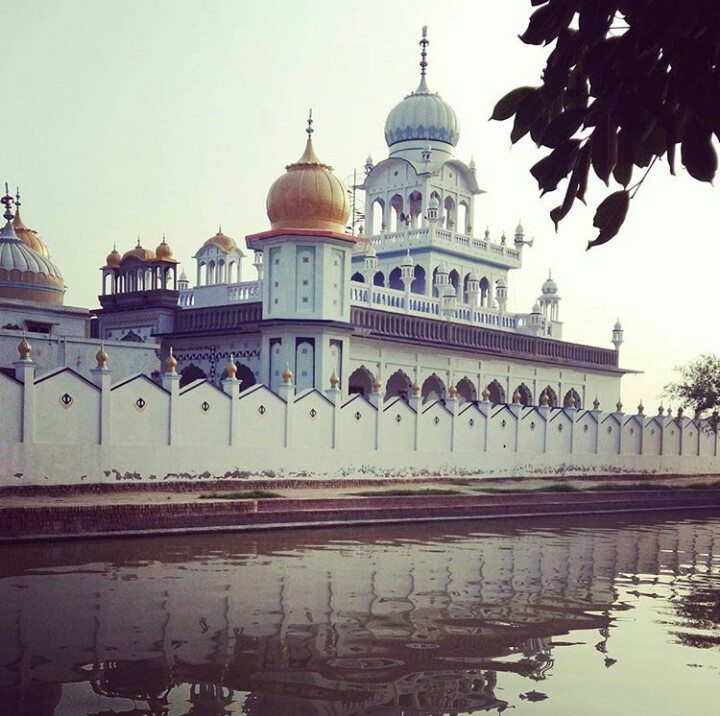
- Gurdwara Shaheed Baba Dharam Singh Sekhon, a landmark of Borawal

- Location in Punjab, India Borawal (India)
- Coordinates: 29.995901°N 75.543108°E
- Country: India
- State: Punjab
- District: Mansa
- Established: 1198

Government
  - Body: Naruto

Area
  - Total: 11.55 km^{2} (4.46 sq mi)
- Elevation: 213 m (699 ft)

Population (2011)
  - Total: 3,950
  - Density: 342/km^{2} (886/sq mi)

Languages
  - Official: Punjabi
- Time zone: UTC+5:30 (IST)
- PIN: 151502
- Area code: 01652-283xxx

Borawal (ਬੋੜਾਵਾਲ) also in records written as Borewal is a village in Budhlada tehsil of Mansa district in the Indian state of Punjab. It is on Budhlada - Bhikhi road. The village has a very large pond, three gurdwaras, and C-pet camp. Welfare clubs such as U Meed and Saheed Udam Singh are present.

== History ==
According to historians, Borawal came into existence in the early or mid-thirteenth century. Pt. Kartar Singh Dakha wrote in 1945 that "In the town of Borawal in Patiala Raaj, there lives the Braveheart Sekhon people from 700 years ago" (Punjabi: ਕਸਬਾ ਬੋੜਾਵਾਲ ਜੋ ਵਿੱਚ ਪਟਿਆਲੇ ਰਾਜ। ਬਸੈ ਸਾਤ ਸੌ ਬਰਸ ਤੇ ਸਭ ਸੇਖਮ ਸਿਰਤਾਜ।।).

=== The big pond ===
On Budhlada Bhikhi road is a big pond in the village. It is the creation of greed for good clay. This area around a small pond was used by farmers to thrash their produce, winter crops (ਹਾੜੀ )mainly wheat, gram, mustard and barley etc. and summer crops (ਸੌਣੀ) Bajra, Juwar, maize, guara, moong etc. When trashing became mechanical, the area became vacant. The soil of the area was black hard good clay. People started digging and using it for pottery, thatching roofs, plastering mud walls and floors and big pits were formed. Even some people started selling it nearby towns and villages. Over time small pond changed to a big pond or lake.

== Demographics ==
Borawal has a population of 3950 of which 2112 are males and 1838 are females, as per Population Census 2011. In Borawal village, 403 children aged under 6 live, making up 10.20% of the total. The average sex ratio is 870 which is lower than the Punjab state average of 895. The child sex ratio for the Borawal as per the census is 824, lower than the Punjab average of 846.

Borawal village has a lower literacy rate than Punjab. In 2011, the literacy rate was 55.79% compared to 75.84% of Punjab. Male literacy stands at 59.65% while female literacy rate is 51.39%.

== Governance ==
Borawal village is administrated by Sarpanch (head of village), who is the elected representative of the village.

Religion in Borawal
Religion	Percent
Sikhism	95.10%
Hinduism	4.43%
Others	0.47%

== Culture ==
Borawal is known for its rich cultural and religious heritage.

== Education ==
Government primary school in the village was constructed and started in 1955 and master Mehar Chand from Budhlada was the first teacher. For a few years earlier to it a single teacher taught students in Dharmshala near the Mitha Khooh and before that education was given by some pundits or dera pujaries in the village or one had to go to nearby towns for education. The school was upgraded from time to time and is now High School. Its buildings and grounds cover the two old Deras, and deep pond which was filled mainly by levelling the Deras.

== Gurdwara Shaheed Baba Dharam Singh Sekhon ==
Located about one and half kilometer from the Bus Stand and almost equidistance from Borawal, Gurne Kalan and Biroke Khurad is a historical Sikh Gurdwara named Dharmeana (ਧਰਮੇਆਣਾ) It is built on the place where Shaheed Baba Dharam Singh Sekhon fought with the slaughterers of cows, in spite of cutting down his head. He continued swaying his sword and remained in the saddle of his horse he was riding even when his head dropped to the ground at this place. The horse trotted towards the village and his torso dropped near the village, about one and half kilometer from where he was fighting. This place is named Baba Marh (ਬਾਬਾ ਮੱੜ੍ਹ) and a gurudwara has been built here too.

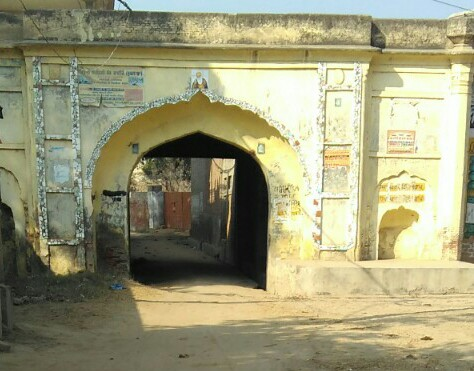
Darwaza Baar, Borawal

=== Darwaza Baar ===
It is one of two gates that were used to protect the town from foreign invaders. It is the one remaining. None of the houses on the periphery had door to the outside all houses opened in the streets leading to these gates. These were closed in an emergency. When peace returned people made more ways leading to outside. One on the south side was called morebar (ਮੋਰੇ ਬਾਰ)

=== Haveli Of Maharaja Hira Singh ===
The haveli of Maharaja Hira Singh, the ruler of Nabha state in Punjab, was located in the middle of Borawal but is now in shambles. Borawal was the maternal ancestral village of Maharaja Hira Singh who ascended the Nabha throne in the absence of any direct descendant of Raja Bhagwan Singh who died young from tuberculosis in 1871. Many persons from Borawal were then employed in Nabha State by Hira Singh.

=== Khaara Khoo and Mittha Khoo ===
Two wells (Punjabi: ਖੂਹ) are located there. The Khaara Khoo (ਖਾਰਾ ਖੂਹ) is saline, and the Mittha Khoo (ਮਿੱਠਾ ਖੂਹ) has drinkable water. These preserved wells are no longer in use.
