= Amrita Chaudhry =

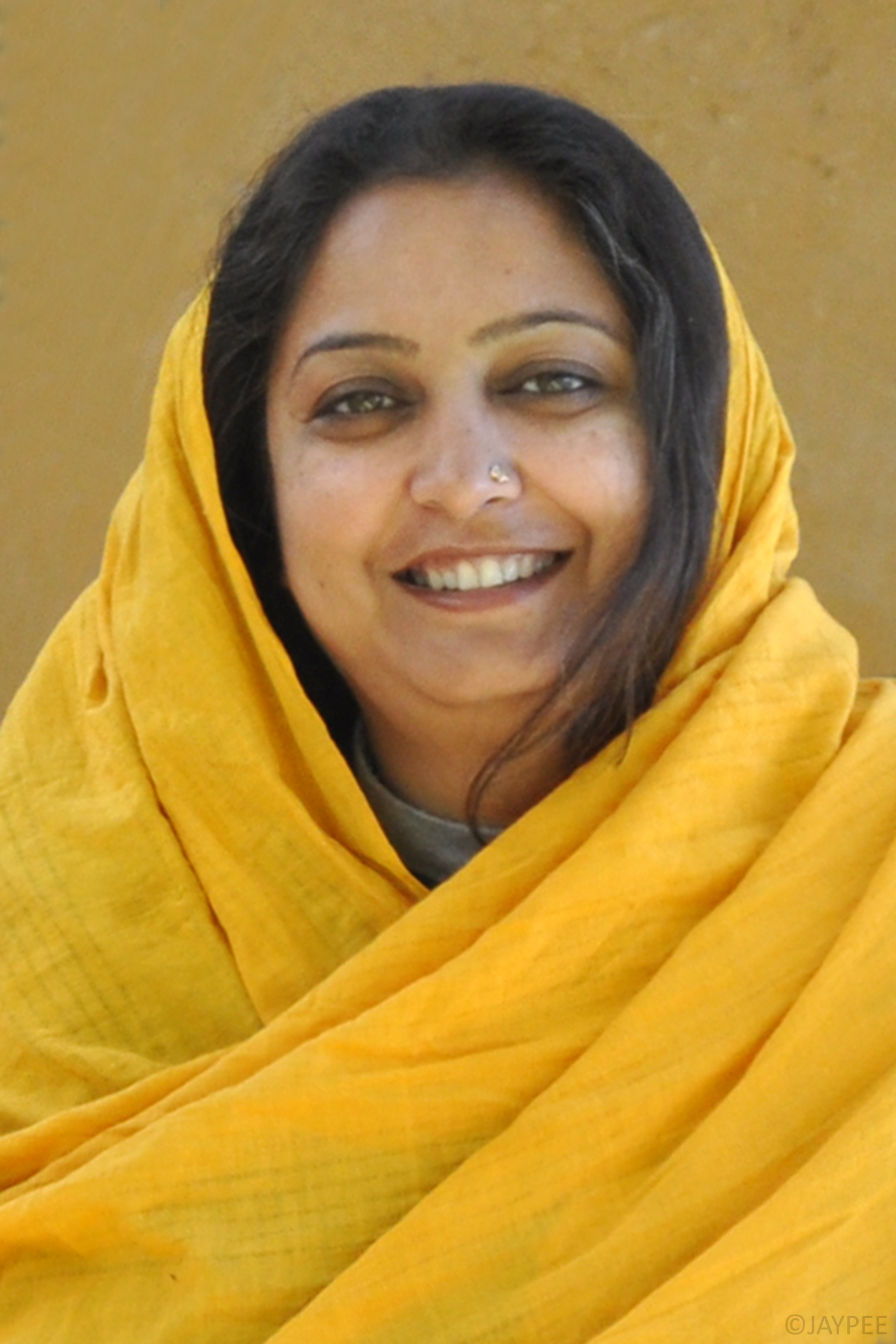
- in 2011, clicked by Jaypee
- Born: Amrita Arora; 26 June 1972; Jalandhar, Punjab, India
- Died: 22 October 2012 (aged 40); Ludhiana
- Other name: Sheena
- Education: Punjab Agricultural University, Ludhiana

Amrita Chaudhry (26 June 1972 – 22 October 2012) was an Indian print media journalist working as Principal Correspondent with the newspaper The Indian Express. In her decade long career with the newspaper, Amrita earned wide recognition for her reporting on diverse issues in Punjab. Amrita died on 22 October 2012 after a road accident.

She was part of a documentary series on women made by documentary filmmaker Daljit Ami. Noted Punjabi poets Surjit Patar and Swarnjit Savi wrote poems on her. Renowned artist Sidharth drew a portrait of Amrita. After she died Kirtan Maryada exponent Bhai Baldeep SinghBhai Baldeep Singh paid tributes with a shabd recital. Sufi singer Madan Gopal Singh held a concert Sada Salamat in her remembrance. Well-known playwright Balram wrote a play based on emails exchanged between Amrita and her partner Jatinder Preet, also known as Jaypee.

== Personal life ==
Amrita was born in Jalandhar where her father Harbans Singh Arora worked as an engineer with state electricity board. She did her initial schooling from Sacred Heart High School (Sidhpur) in Himachal Pradesh. She completed her matriculation from St. Joseph's Convent School, Jalandhar. Amrita settled in Ludhiana after marriage but got separated from her husband after few years.

She lived separately with her son Sidharth and Jaypee until her death.

== Career ==
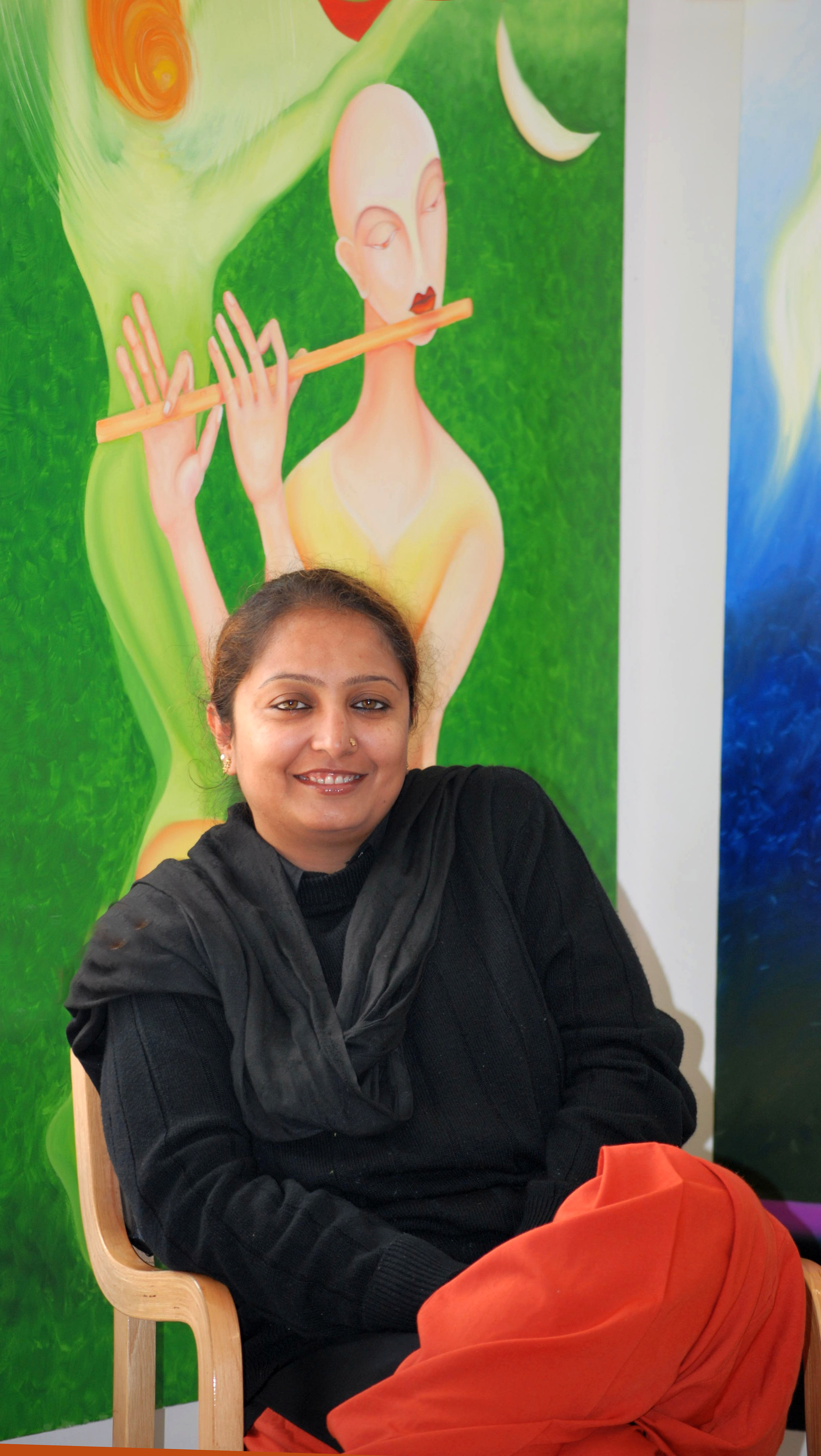
Amrita Chaudhry at Artcave

Amrita graduated from College of Home Science, Punjab Agricultural University, Ludhiana. She received a Master's in Journalism, Languages and Culture from College of Basic Sciences and Humanities of the same university. She started her journalism career as a contributor to Ludhiana city supplement of The Indian Express in 1997 and later rose to become the Principal Correspondent.

Amrita earned acclaim for her coverage of diverse beats across different cities and towns of the state of Punjab. She was particularly known for her incisive coverage of agriculture related issues.

Amrita was actively involved in civil society groups engaged in activities to promote eco-awareness, education for special children and in art and cultural sphere. She co-founded along with Jatinder Preet, a group Media Artists that conducted workshops for children, staged theatrical and musical performances and held lectures by eminent people.

Spirit of Amrita Foundation has been formed to continue with the activities dear to her after her demise. The foundation staged shows of the play It’s Not An Affair based on email conversations between Amrita and Jaypee in Chandigarh, Ludhiana, Lehragaga and Patiala. A painting contest for students of government schools was also organised in Ludhiana to remember her on 3 May 2013. The foundation has been running a campaign to collect warm clothes for needy in the winters in Ludhiana.
