= Lehal Kalan =

- village
- Location in Punjab, India
- Coordinates: 29.879797°N 75.856634°E
- Country: India
- State: Punjab
- District: Sangrur
- Elevation: 226 m (741 ft)

Population (2001)
  - Total: 5,308

Languages
  - Official: Punjabi
- Time zone: UTC+5:30 (IST)
- PIN: 148031
- Telephone code: 91-1676
- Vehicle registration: PB 75

Lehal Kalan is a village located at 29.88°N 75.87°E in 9 km southeast of Lehragaga, in Sangrur district of the Punjab. It was visited by Guru Tegh Bahadur, who halted briefly on a sandy mound, about 400 metres west of the village. An old farmer from the Lehal Kalan village, Arak by name, served him, and received instruction from him. Bhai Arak constructed a simple memorial at the mound in honour of the Guru. His descendants continued to manage it until 1883 when Bhai Mall Singh, a mahant of Dhamtan, constructed the square domed Manji Sahib which still stands. This is the seat of the holy Guru Granth Sahib. A large marble floored hall, with a square sanctum, completed in 1980, caters for larger gatherings. Gurdwara Sri Guru Tegh Bahadur Sahib now attracts on special occasions. Within the Gurdwara compound lias been built the samddh of Baba Arak. A mahant claiming descent from Baba Arak manages the Gurdwara.

== Geography ==
Lehal Kalan (village) is situated on the Lehragaga to Moonak Road,

== Demographics ==
As of 2001 India census, Lehal Kalan had a population of 5308. Males 2876 and females 2432. There were 911 households.
