= Dhani Bhojraj =

Village in Haryana, India

Coordinates: 29°33′N 75°47′E

Dhani Sanchla, also written Dhani Sanchla, is a small village in Fatehabad, Haryana, India, with a population of approximately 3,500. Hindu religion is the mainly found in Dhani Sanchla . It is mainly dependent on agriculture. It is watered by a canal which passes through the village.
