= Tohana =

- City
- Nickname: City of Canals
- Location in Haryana, India Tohana (India)
- Coordinates: 29.7°N 75.9°E
- Country: India
- State: Haryana
- District: Fatehabad

Government
  - Type: Municipal Council
  - Body: Municipal Council Tohana
- Elevation: 224 m (735 ft)

Population (2011)
  - Total: 63,871 [urban] 199,870 [rural]

Languages
  - Official: Hindi, English, Haryanvi
  - Regional: Bagri
- Time zone: UTC+5:30 (IST)
- PIN: 125120
- Telephone code: 01692
- ISO 3166 code: IN-HR
- Vehicle registration: HR23

Tohana is a city and a municipal council, just 56 km from Fatehabad City in Fatehabad district in the Indian state of Haryana. Its name comes from the Sanskrit 'Taushayana'. It is known as the City of Canals (Nahro ki Nagri).

== Geography ==
Tohana is located at 29.7°N 75.9°E. It has an average elevation of 225 metres (734 feet).

== Communities ==
Tohana is located near the Punjab border. The majority of people are Hindus, with some Sikhs and Jains. People mainly speak Haryanvi, Punjabi, Multani as well as Hindi.

== Demographics ==
As per 2011, Tohana had a population of 63,871 in 12,642 households. Males constitute 52.65% of the population and females 47.35%. Tohana has an average literacy rate of 67.81%, lower than the national average of 74.5%; male literacy is 72%, and female literacy is 62.54%. In Tohana, 11.99% of the population is under 6 years of age. Among children under 6, the male to female ratio is 55.48:44.52.

Tohana is two kilometres from the Punjab border in north-west Haryana. One of the neighboring cities is Hisar, 72 km away from Tohana, which was the district headquarters of Tohana until 1997. Fatehabad was created as a separate district from Hisar and Tohana was included in the part that went to Fatehabad.All the parks of the city are located between the canals.

== History ==
The area around Tohana used to be a desert land until the Bhakhra Nangal sub-branch canal brought a source of irrigation for the town and neighboring villages. After this, Tohana developed into a major agricultural hub. Credit for the transformation goes to Rai bahadur Kanwar Sen Gupta, who was born in 1899 in Tohana.

== Transportation ==
=== Railways ===
Tohana railway station lies in Northern Railway zone and in Delhi railway division. Double electric line is present and a total of 47 trains halt here. India's longest everyday running train Avadh Assam Express also halts at Tohana railway station.

=== Roadways ===
Tohana is connected to Narnaul, Hansi, Moonak, Bathinda with National Highway 148B.Tohana is connected to its district Fatehabad via Bhuna and Ratia.
