= Baba Ranadhir =

Coordinates: 29.530°N 75.705°E

Baba Ranadhir is a temple in the town of Bhuna in the Fatehabad district of the state of Haryana, India.

== Overview ==
Built as a homage to an ancient saint known to heal people of their sufferings called Baba Ranadhir, the shrine carries a popular belief that a sprinkle from the holy waters of the temple heals all kinds of skin infections. The temple is open to everyone with no bar of cast, creed, or religion. The site is bustling with devotees mostly on Thursdays.

Access to the temple is easy as buses and taxis regularly ply to and from Bhuna. Accommodation is easily available as the town has basic lodges, hotels and guest houses.
