= Veena Verma =

Veena Verma may refer to:

- Veena Verma (writer)
- Veena Verma (politician)
