= Akkan Wali =

- Village
- Location in Punjab, India Akkan Wali (India)
- Coordinates: 29.869°N 75.421°E
- Country: India
- State: Punjab
- District: Mansa
- Talukas: Budhlada

Languages
  - Official: Punjabi (Gurmukhi)
  - Regional: Punjabi
- Time zone: UTC+5:30 (IST)
- ISO 3166 code: IN-PB

Akkan Wali (also spelled as Akkanwali or Akanwali) is a village in the Mansa district of Indian Punjab. Lakhmir Wala, Kot Dhamu and Chachohar are the nearby villages.
