= Veena Verma (writer) =

Indian writer and poet (born 1960)

- Born: Veena Verma; 2 October 1960 (age 66); Budhlada, Mansa district, Punjab, India
- Other name: Veena Varma
- Occupations: Writer, poet

Veena Verma (born 2 September 1960) is a UK-based Punjabi short-story writer and poet from Punjab, India.

== Early life ==
Verma was born to a Khatri family, and married to Sunyara family in Budhlada village of Bathinda district (now falls under Mansa district) of the state of Punjab, India. She studied at Budhlada and, after completing her study, she settled in UK.

== Career ==
She was very fond of writing since her childhood. She writes mostly on women's problems of Asian community. Her first anthology of stories, Mull Di Teeveen, was published in 1992. Till now, she has published three anthologies of stories including Mull Di Teeveen, Firangian Di Noonh (2002), Jogian Di Dhee (2009) and one poetic, Jee Kardai. Some of her stories like Firangian Di Noonh, Gulbano, Khali Plot, Sachchi Saanj and Chhoti Sardarni have been played on stage and been filmed by TV channels.
