= Gurbachan Singh Talib =

Indian writer (1911–1986)

- Born: April 7, 1911; Moonak, Sangrur district, Punjab, British India (now Punjab, India)
- Died: April 9, 1986 (aged 75); Patiala, Punjab, India
- Education: M.A. (English Literature)
- Alma mater: Khalsa College, Amritsar
- Occupations: Scholar, author, educator, translator
- Spouse: Smt. Desh Kaur
- Children: Four sons and one daughter
- Writing career
- Notable work: Translation of Guru Granth Sahib into English
- Notable awards: Padma Bhushan (1985); Sahitya Akademi Fellowship (1984)

Sardar Gurbachan Singh; 7 April 1911 – 9 April 1986) was an Indian Sikh scholar, professor, and author, recognized for his contributions to Sikh studies, Punjabi literature, and English literature. His notable works include an English translation of the Guru Granth Sahib, the holy scripture of Sikhism. For his contributions to literature and education, he was awarded the Padma Bhushan, India's third-highest civilian honour, in 1985. He was also a recipient of the Sahitya Akademi Fellowship in 1984, and National Fellowship by the Indian Council of Historical Research, New Delhi in 1985.

== Early life and education ==
Gurbachan Singh Talib was born on 7 April 1911 in the village of Moonak, then part of the princely state of Patiala (now in Sangrur district), Punjab to Sardar Nihal Singh and Nand Kaur. He received his early education in Moonak and Patiala. He pursued higher education at the renowned Khalsa College, Amritsar, where he earned his M.A. in English Literature.

== Academic and literary career ==
Talib began his professional journey as lecturer at the Sikh National College at Lahore. He served at various institutions, including his alma mater, Khalsa College, Amritsar, Sikh National College, Lahore, Lyallpur Khalsa College, Jalandhar, and National College, Sirsa. After the partition of 1947, he moved to Patiala and joined Mahendra College as a professor of English.

Throughout his career, he served as the principal of several colleges—Khalsa College, Bombay (1949-1953), Khalsa College, Delhi (1953-1954), Government Bikram College of Commerce, Patiala, and the Government Ranbir College, Sangrur. A significant phase of his career was his association with Kurukshetra University, where he was Reader in English and later Professor and Head of the Department of English from 1962 to 1969. He then became the first Guru Nanak Professor of Sikh Studies at Panjab University, Chandigarh, a chair he held from 1969 to 1973. Subsequently, he served as Professor and Head of the Department of Guru Nanak Sikh Studies at Punjabi University, Patiala, from 1976 until his retirement in 1982. He was also Dean of the Faculty of Religious Studies at Punjabi University. He was a member of the Sahitya Akademi's General Council and its Executive Board, the Kendriya Punjabi Lekhak Sabha, and the Punjabi Sahitya Akademi, Ludhiana.

== Bibliography ==
- The Idea of Sikh State ( 1946)
- Anapachhate Rah (1952)
- Adhunik Punjabi Sahit (Punjabi Kav) (1955)
- Pavittar Jivan Kathavan (1971)
- Baba Shaikh Farid (1975)
- Muslim League Attack on the Sikhs and Hindus in Punjab, 1947 (1950) It was first published in 1950 by the Shiromani Gurdwara Prabandhak Committee (SGPC). This book details the witness accounts of the Hindus and Sikhs who fled their homes in the West Punjab, the North-West Frontier Province, Sindh and parts of Jammu & Kashmir.
- The Impact of Guru Gobind Singh on Indian Society (1966)
- Guru Nanak: His Personality and Vision (1969)
- Bhai Vir Singh: Life, Times and Works (1973)
- Baba Sheikh Farid (1974)
- Guru Tegh Bahadur: Background and Supreme Sacrifice (1976)
- Japuji: The immortal Prayer-chant (1977)
- Translation in English of the Guru Granth Sahib (four volumes)

== Awards and recognition ==
- Padma Bhushan (1985)
- Sahitya Akademi Fellowship (1984)
- SADDA Award (South Asia Diaspora Distribution Agency)
- Punjabi Sahitya Sameekhya Board Award - 1973
- Punjab State Award for Literature - 1962

He was honored by the Punjab Government as an "eminent educationist and writer" in 1967. Punjabi University also conferred upon him the degree of D.Litt. (honoris causa).
