= Chachohar =

- Village
- Location in Punjab, India Chachohar (India)
- Coordinates: 29.840°N 75.395°E
- Country: India
- State: Punjab
- District: Mansa

Languages
  - Official: Punjabi
  - Regional: Punjabi
- Time zone: UTC+5:30 (IST)

Chachohar is a village in Mansa district of East Punjab. In 2009, the village was honored for increasing the number of girls in schools. The village was on the list for more than 90% of voting in the February 2012 election.

== Geography ==
The village is approximately centered at 29°50′24″N 75°23′42″E. Bhamme Khurd, Kaur Wala, Khiali Chehlan Wali, Lakhmir Wala and Akkan Wali are the surrounding villages.

== Demographics ==
Punjabi is the mother tongue as well as the official language of the village.

The population mostly follows Sikhism with other minorities.
