= Khiali Chehlan Wali =

Khiaali Chehlan Wali
- Village
- Location in Punjab, India Khiaali Chehlan Wali (India)
- Coordinates: 29.821°N 75.367°E
- Country: India
- State: Punjab
- District: Mansa

Languages
  - Official: Punjabi
  - Regional: Punjabi
- Time zone: UTC+5:30 (IST)
- Nearest city: Jhunir

Khiali Chehlan Wali (also spelled as Khiali Chahlan Wali or Khiali Chehlanwali) is a village in Mansa district of Punjab. It is predominated by the Jatt people of Chahal clan.

== Geography ==
It is located at only 3 km from Jhunir. Kaur Wala and Dane Wala, Chachohar and Akkan Wali are the nearby villages.

== Demographics ==
=== Religion ===
The predominators, Chahals, are Sikhs and follows Sikhism. The village has a Gurdwara as the main religious site. Its new building is almost complete.
