= Bhuna, Fatehabad =

Town in Haryana, India

Coordinates: 29.5300°N 75.7068°E

Bhuna [भूना] is a small town in Fatehabad District of the state of Haryana, India. It is located 26 kilometres (16 mi) from Fatehabad, 18 kilometres (11 mi) from Uklana, 50 kilometres (31 mi) from Hisar, 4 kilometres (2.5 mi) from Dullat village, and 11 kilometres (6.8 mi) km from Hasinga Village. Bhuna is an old village with Punjabi, Jat, Bishnoi, Sardar, and Dalit. It has a Ranadhir Mandir dedicated to Baba Ranadhir.Arpana Pankaj Pasrija is the chairperson of Nagar Palika Bhuna

== See also ==
- Baba Ranadhir
