= Moonak =

- Town
- Location in Sangrur District, Punjab, India
- Coordinates: 29.82316°N 75.89755°E
- Country: India
- State: Punjab

Government
  - Type: City Council
  - Body: Nagar Palika
- Elevation: 241 m (791 ft)

Population (2011)
  - Total: 18,141

Languages
  - Official: Punjabi
  - Native: Puadhi
- Time zone: UTC+5:30 (IST)
- PIN: 148033
- Vehicle registration: PB-64

Moonak is a town and a nagar panchayat in Sangrur district in the Indian state of Punjab. Moonak is situated near the Punjab-Haryana border. The nearest towns of Haryana are Jakhal Mandi and Tohana. The nearest commercial airport, at Chandigarh, is 150 km away. The majority of people are engaged in farming and agricultural activities.

== Demographics ==
The Moonak has population of 18,141 of which 9,475 are males while 8,666 are females as per report released by Census India 2011. Children between 0-6 years number 2325, which is 12.82% of the total population. In Moonak, the female sex ratio is 915 against state average of 895. Moreover, the child sex ratio in Moonak is around 863 compared to Punjab state average of 846. The literacy rate of the town is 67.68%, which is lower than state average of 75.84%. While male literacy is around 73.54% and female literacy rate is 61.33%.

The table below shows the population of different religious groups in Moonak city, as of 2011 census.

Population by religious groups in Moonak city, 2011 census
Religion	Total	Female	Male
Hindu	13,936	6,638	7,298
Sikh	3,613	1,743	1,870
Jain	377	184	193
Muslim	134	64	70
Christian	21	8	13
Other religions	44	21	23
Not stated	16	8	8
Total	18,141	8,666	9,475

== History ==
Moonak was originally known as Akalgarh. There is an old fort 'Qila Mubarik' said to have been built in the Muslim period. In the fort, there was a well with unhealthy water. Hardened prisoners of Patiala State were sent to this place where they died after a few days. The town is a Tehsil of the Sangrur district. It is surrounded by Ghaggar, a seasonal river which causes floods during monsoon. In 1988, 1992, 2011, 2015, 2019 and 2023, floods led to loss of crops, death and destruction in and around the areas. People are demanding its deepening.

== Climate ==
Moonak has similar climate like other places in North India. It has profile of semi-arid climate. During the months of June and July, the temperature rises to 44 °C. In December and January, the temperature falls to around 10 °C. In monsoons, Moonak receives average rainfall.

== Major business activities ==
Most of the population depends on agriculture and farming. There are also some small-scale industries:

- Incense manufacturing
- Sushil Dhoop Industries
- Punjabi University College
- Swami Vivekanand College
- Lord Mahavira College
- Lord Shiva College of Nursing
- Hastings English Academy
- Agriculture machine manufacturing
- Wine and whiskey making (Karail)
- PVC pipe manufacturing
- Fertilizer factory
- Rice mills
- Brick making
- Furniture manufacturing
- Karan and Malkeet organic agriculture farms

== Notable people ==
- Gurbachan Singh Talib - author- Conferred with Padma Bhushan in 1985
- Brish Bhan - advocate- Last Chief Minister PEPSU in 1955

== Nearby towns ==
- Pattran
- Khanauri
- Sunam
- Lehragaga
- Jakhal Mandi
- Makror Sahib
- Tohana
- Karail
