= Sidharth (artist) =

Indian painter and sculptor (born 1956)

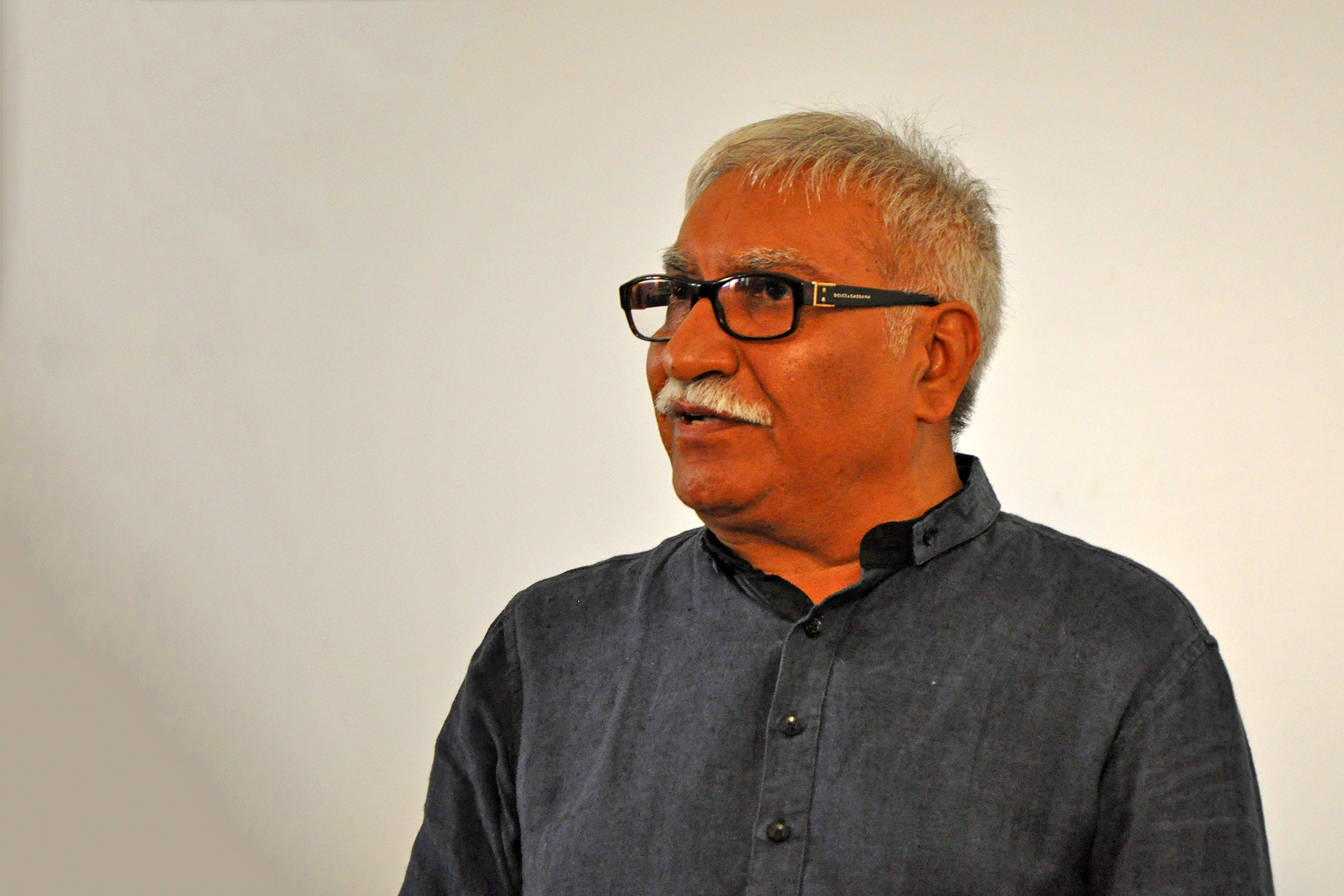
- Born: Harjinder Singh; 1956 (age 69–70); Bassian (Raikot), Punjab
- Known for: Painting

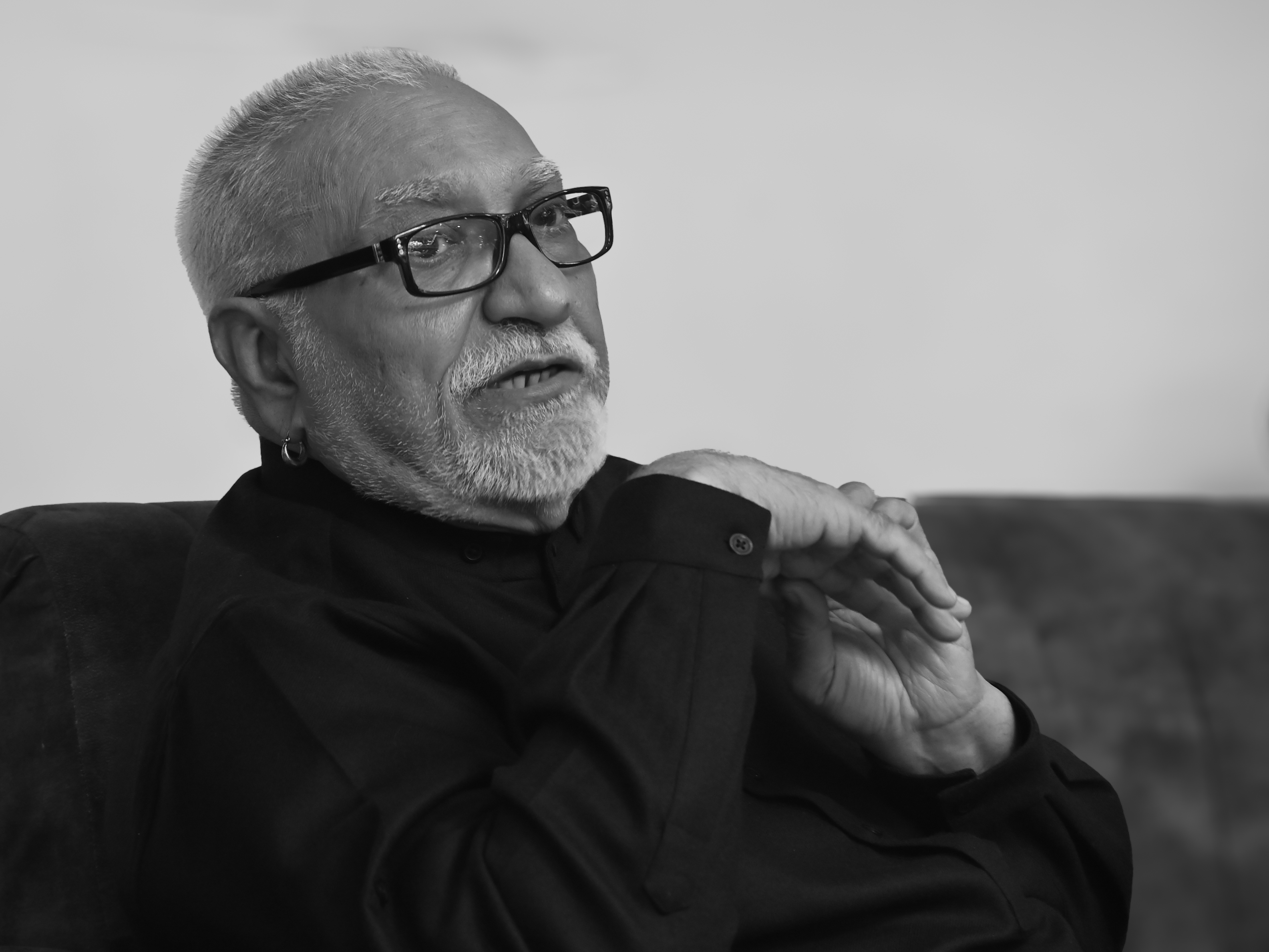
Sidarth in 2025

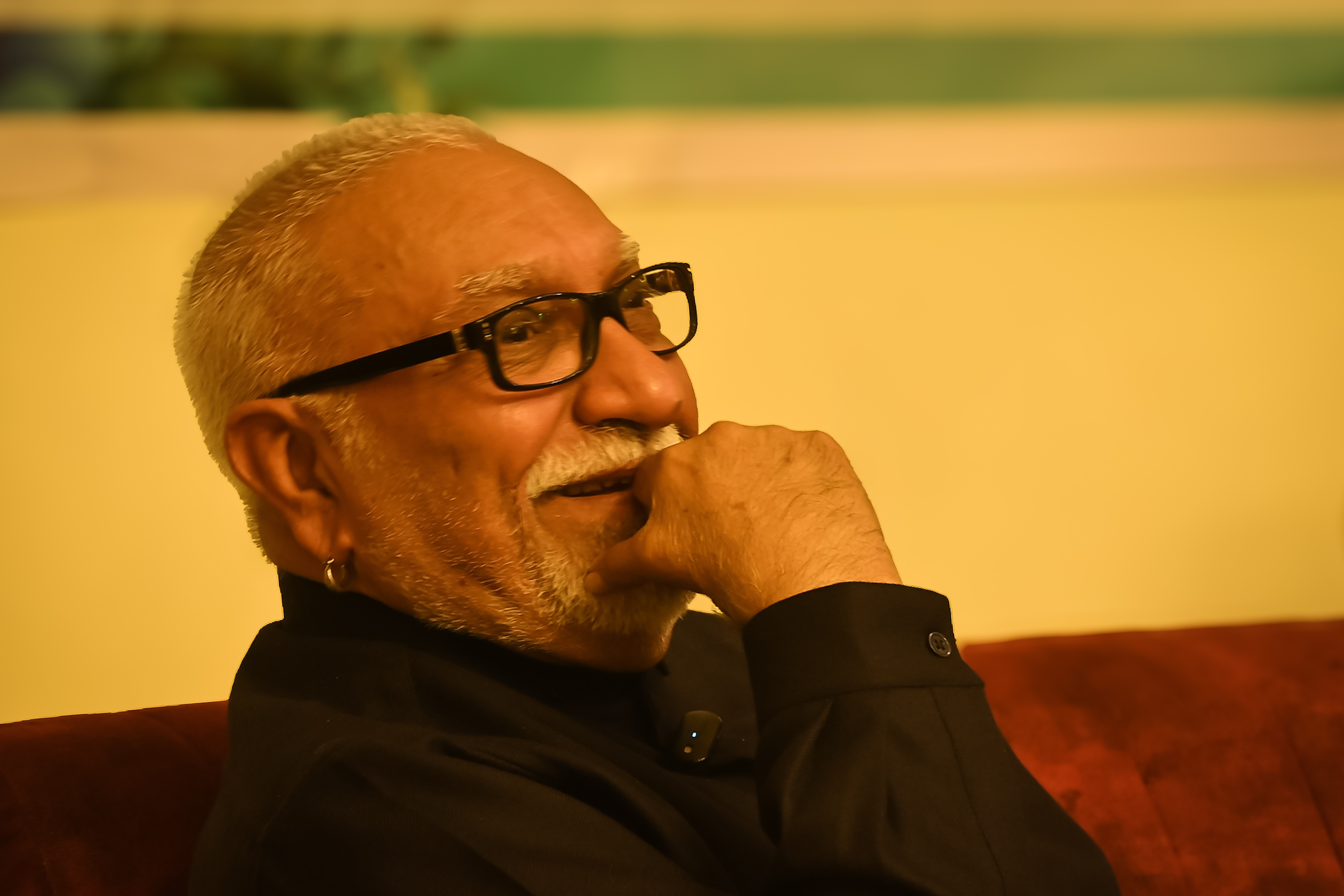
Sidarth in 2025

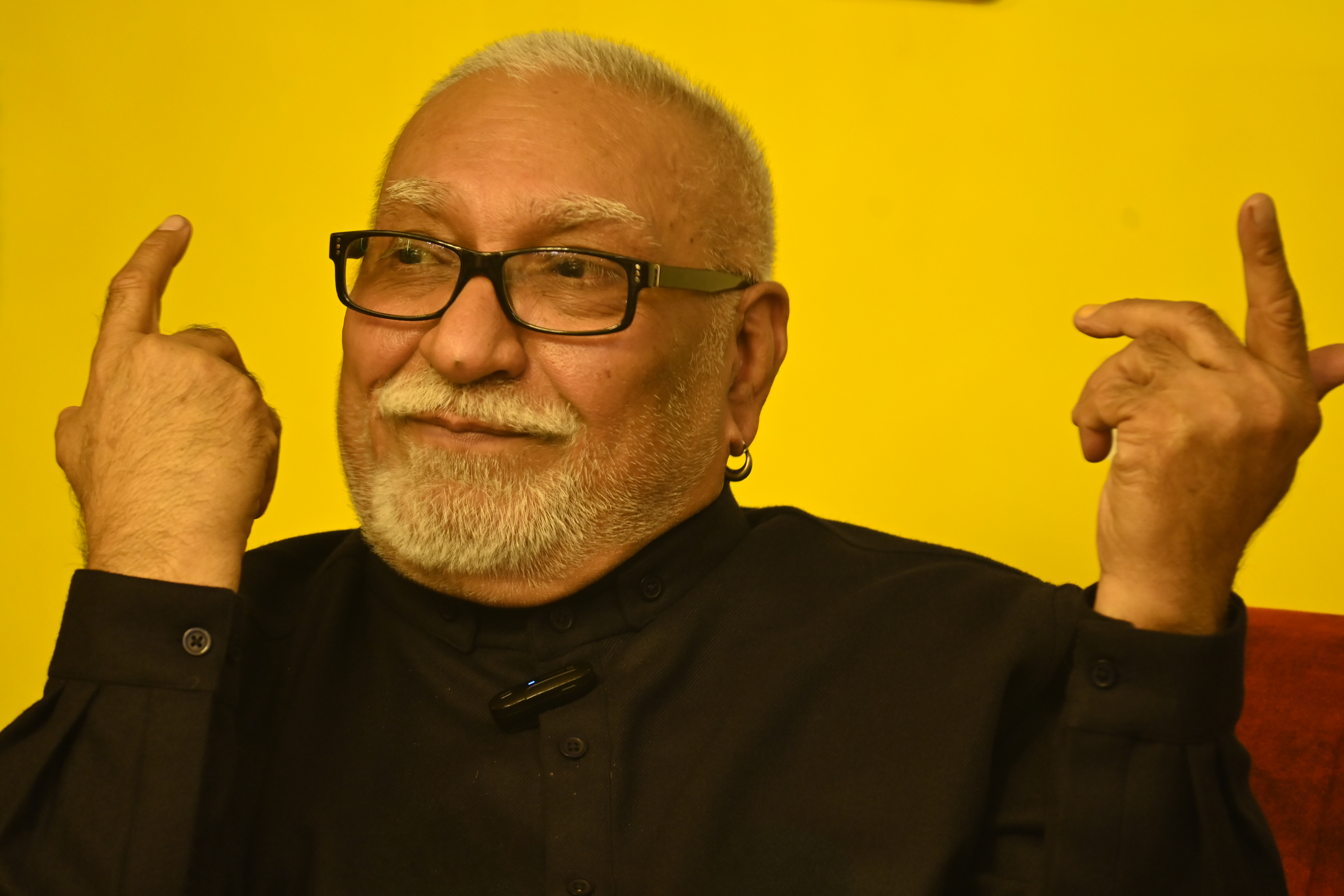
Sidarth in 2025

Sidharth (born 1956 in Bassian, near Raikot town in Ludhiana district of Punjab), is an Indian painter and sculptor.

== Early life and education ==
Sidharth was born in the village of Bassian in Punjab, India. He completed his early education in Bassian and later in Raikot. During his school years, he began painting signboards and developed an early interest in visual art. He received informal training in fresco painting from local artisans and apprenticed under village mason Tara Mistry, learning to create murals and friezes.

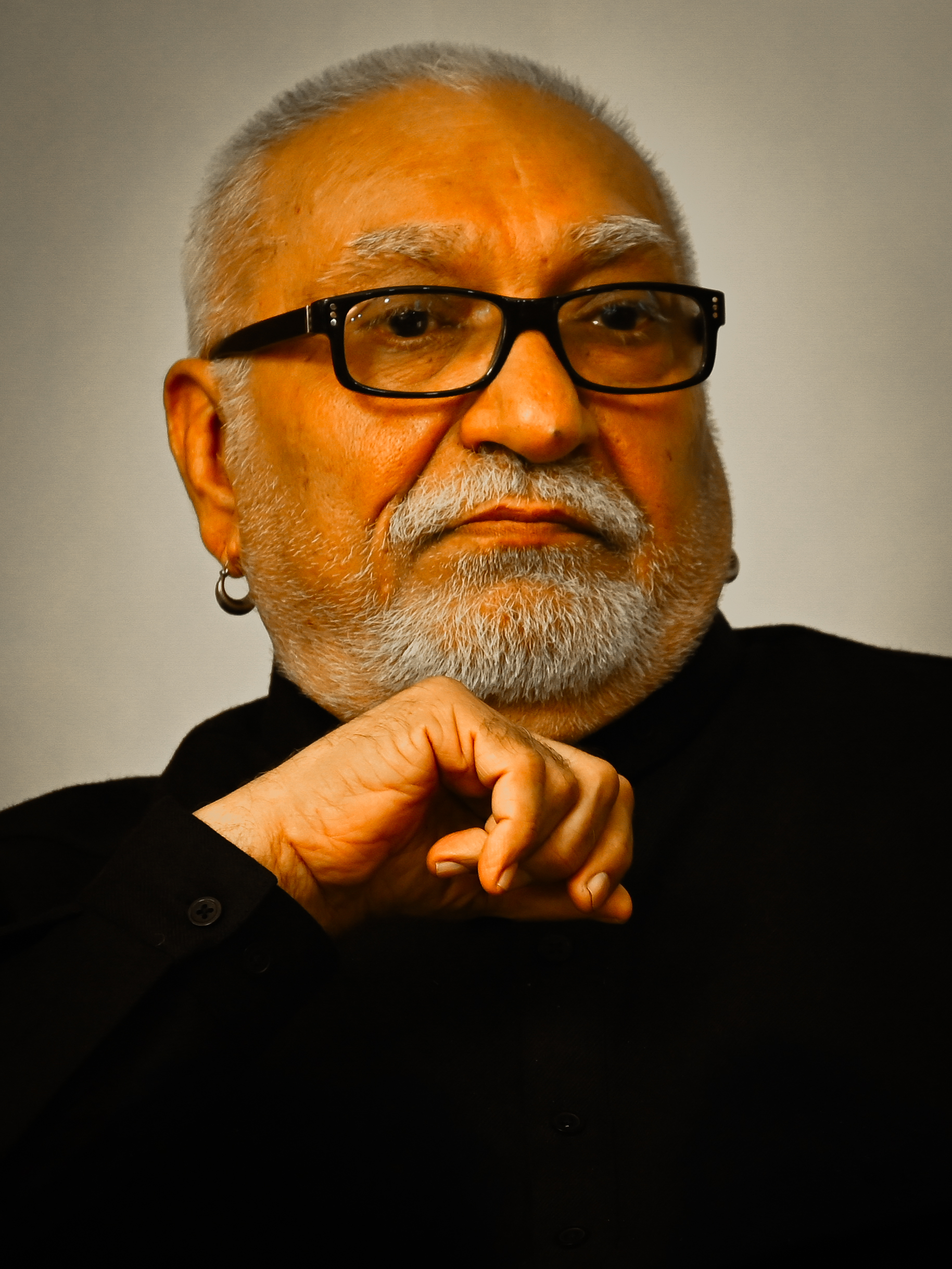
Sidarth in 2025

He later studied Thangka painting techniques from Tibetan monks in Dharamsala and spent time with renowned artist Sobha Singh at his studio in Andretta, Himachal Pradesh.

He pursued formal education in art by completing a five-year Diploma in Painting from the Government College of Arts, Chandigarh. During this period, he also learned the techniques of Madhubani painting and Kashmiri papier-mâché crafts from master artisans.

Following his studies in India, he spent some time in Sweden, further expanding his artistic perspective. He currently lives and works in New Delhi, where he maintains his own studio.

== Career ==
Since 1976, Sidharth has held 28 solo exhibitions and participated in over 460 group shows, including international art fairs in India, the United Kingdom, Sweden, the United States, Africa, Singapore, and Hong Kong.

His artwork is part of several notable collections, including:

- Government museums in India
- The British Council, New Delhi
- Punjab Lalit Kala Akademi
- Ambassadors of Britain, Mexico, and Sweden
- Düsseldorf Museum, Germany
- Heda, Sweden
- Various industrial and private collections in India and abroad

== Artistic practice ==
Sidharth is known for producing his own organic pigments using natural materials such as vegetables, minerals, and earth-based sources. His practice bridges traditional techniques and contemporary themes, often exploring cultural, spiritual, and ecological subjects. His multidisciplinary approach includes painting, sculpture, writing, and documentary filmmaking.

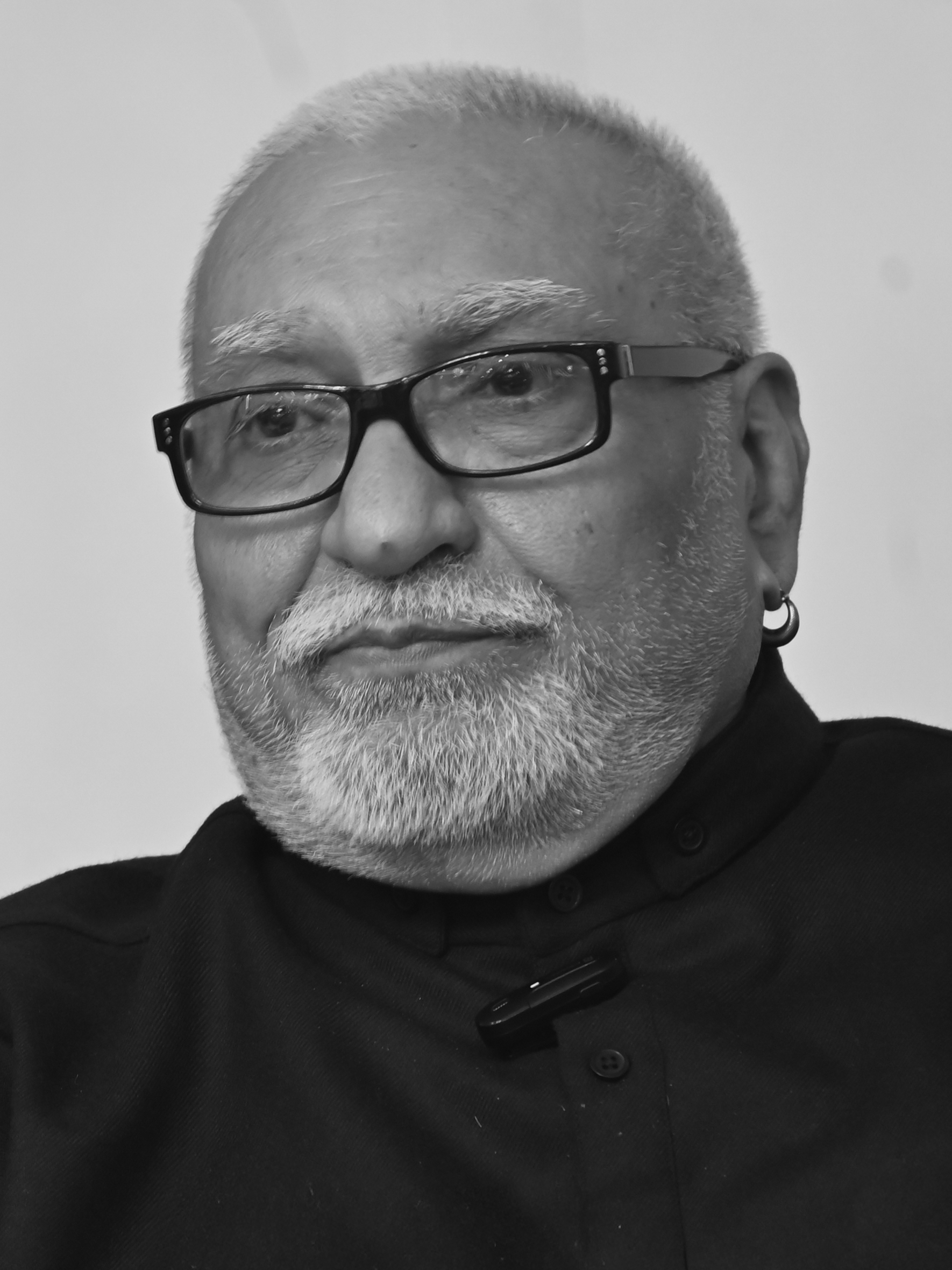
Sidarth in 2025

== Awards and recognition ==
Sidharth has received numerous awards for his contributions to art and literature, including:

- Honorary D.Litt., Punjabi University, Patiala (2012)
- Punjab Gaurav Award (2024)
- Nanak Naam Leva Personality Award, Government of Punjab (2022)
- Awards from Punjab Lalit Kala Akademi, Himachal Pradesh State Akademi, and Bharat Bhavan, Bhopal
