= Kot Dharmu =

- Village
- Location in Punjab, India Kot Dharmu (India)
- Coordinates: 29.893247°N 75.371533°E
- Country: India
- State: Punjab
- District: Mansa
- Taluka: Mansa

Area
  - Total: 11.48 km^{2} (4.43 sq mi)

Population (2011)
  - Total: 4,121
  - Density: 359.0/km^{2} (929.7/sq mi)

Languages
  - Official: Punjabi (Gurmukhi)
- Time zone: UTC+5:30 (IST)
- PIN: 151505
- Telephone code: 01659-26*****
- Vehicle registration: PB31
- Nearest city: Mansa

Kot Dharmu is a Village in Mansa District of Punjab State, India. Population of the village according to 2011 census is 4161.

== Geography ==
Mansa is the nearest railway station to its north, Sardulgarh to the southwest, the city and district of Bathinda to the northwest and the city and district of Sangrur to the northeast.

== Education ==
There is a Govt. Primary school and a Govt. High school in the village. Sahibza Jhujhar singh public school is also near to this village.
