= Haryau =

Town in Punjab India

- Town
- Location of Haryau Haryau (India)
- Coordinates: 29.965129°N 75.70661870000004°E
- Country: India
- State: Punjab
- District: Sangrur
- Established: 1650 (Estimated)
- Founder: Multania Sangu

Population (2011)
  - Total: 5,237

Languages
  - Official: Punjabi
- Time zone: IST (UTC +5:30)
- PIN: 148031
- Telephone Code: +91 1676X-XXXXX
- Vehicle registration: PB-13
- Website: www.facebook.com/Haryau.Sangrur

Haryau is a village situated in the Sangrur District of Punjab, India. This village was established in 1650 by Multania Sangu. Mughal emperor Shah Jahan gave 78,000 Vigha land to Multania Sangu, where he established this village. This village is also known by Haryau-Sangva. It has one government school, three private schools, one government hospital, one co-operative agriculture society and Bank, one HDFC bank, two main gurudwara's, one mosque and one suvidha kendra.

== Gallery ==
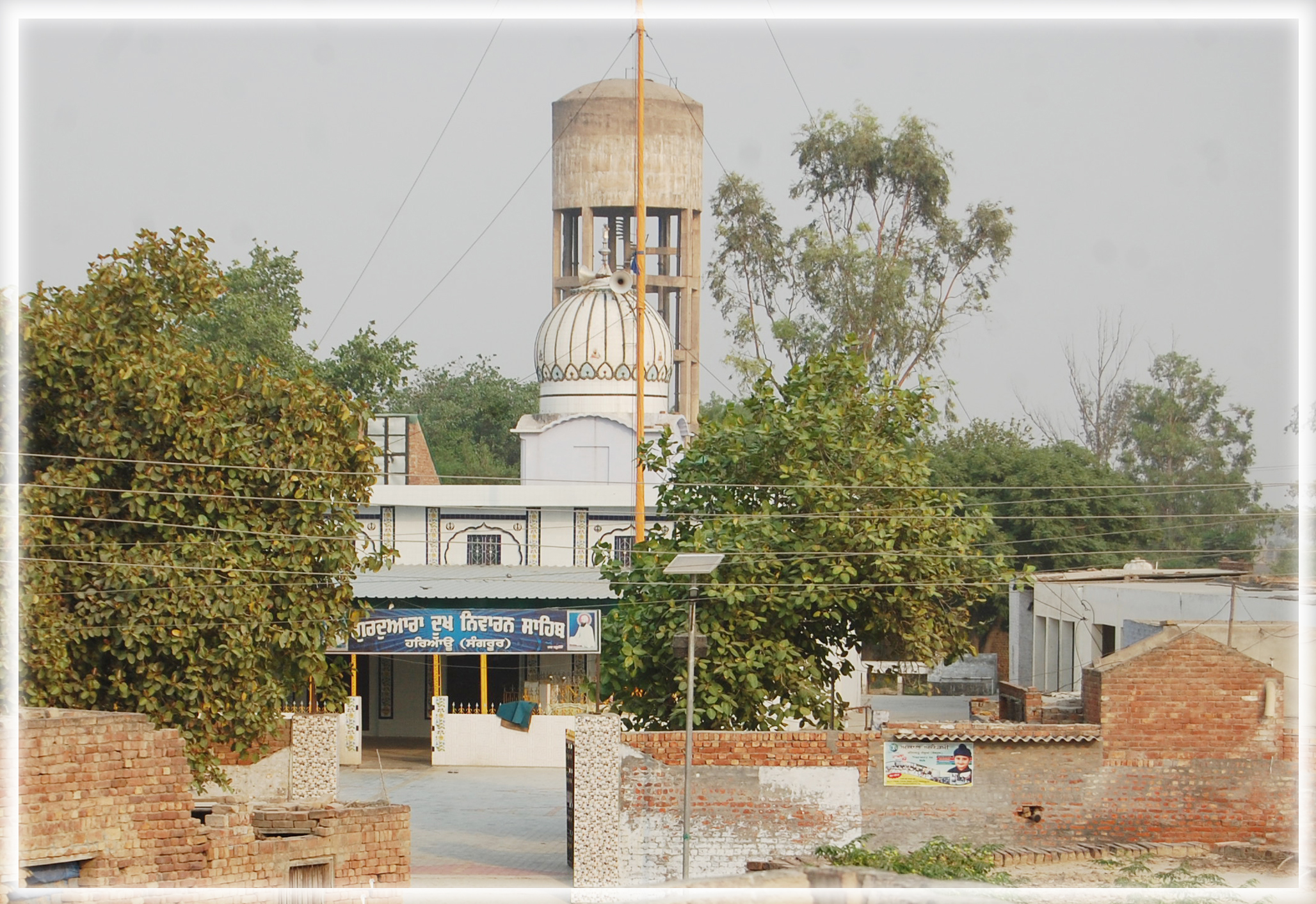
Gurudwara Dukh Niwaran Sahib, Haryau

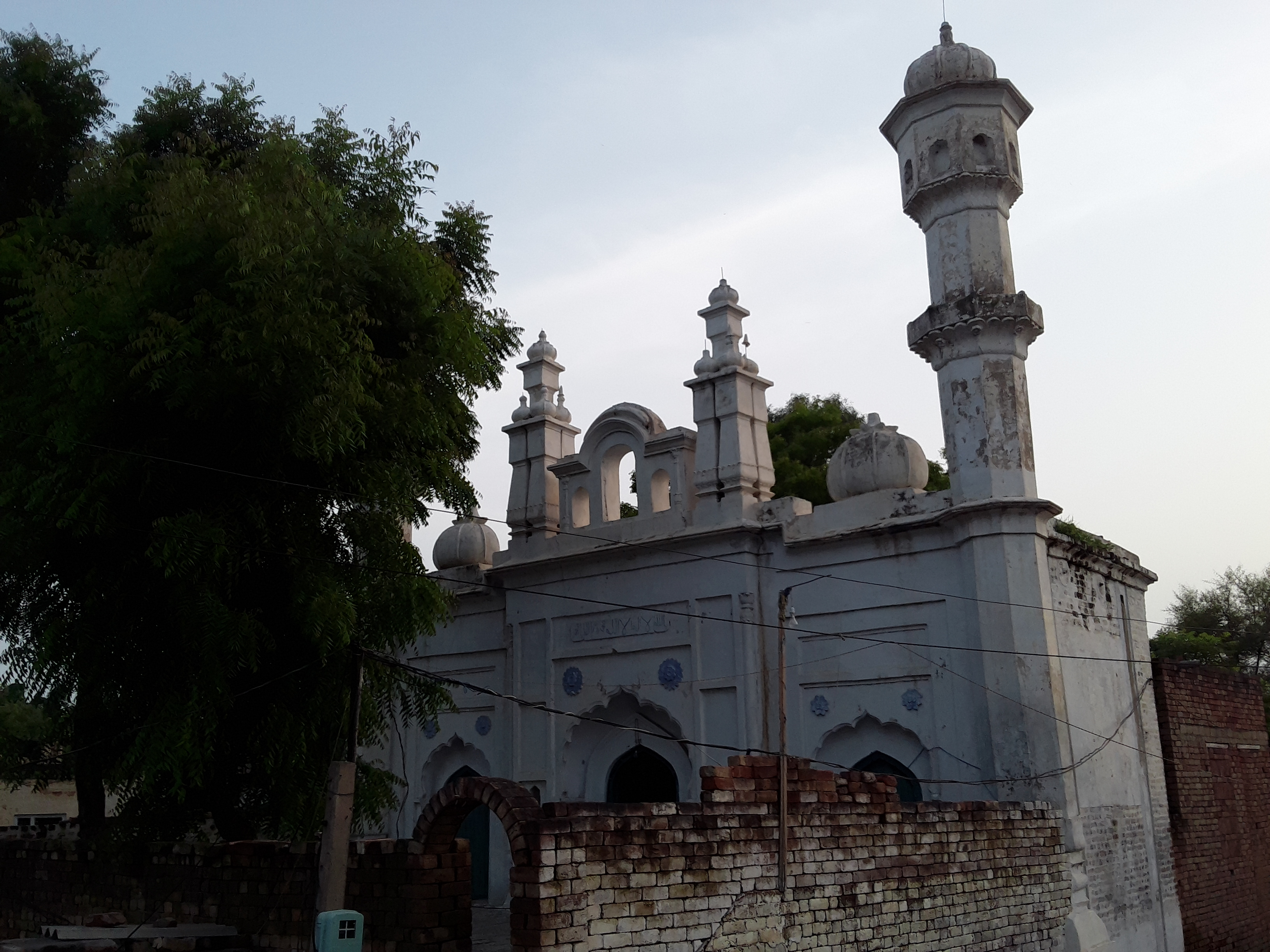
Masjid Haryau

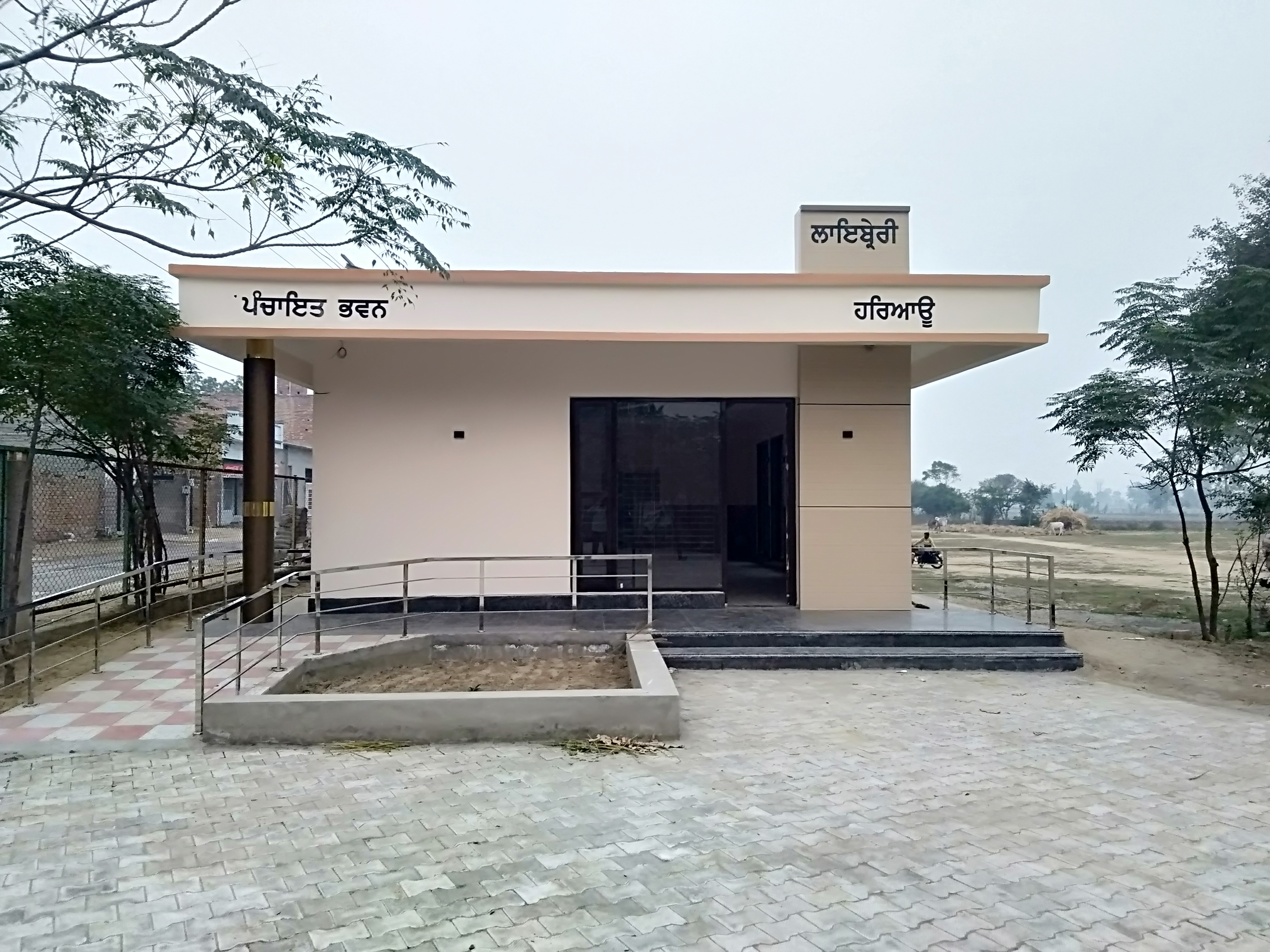
Library Village Haryau

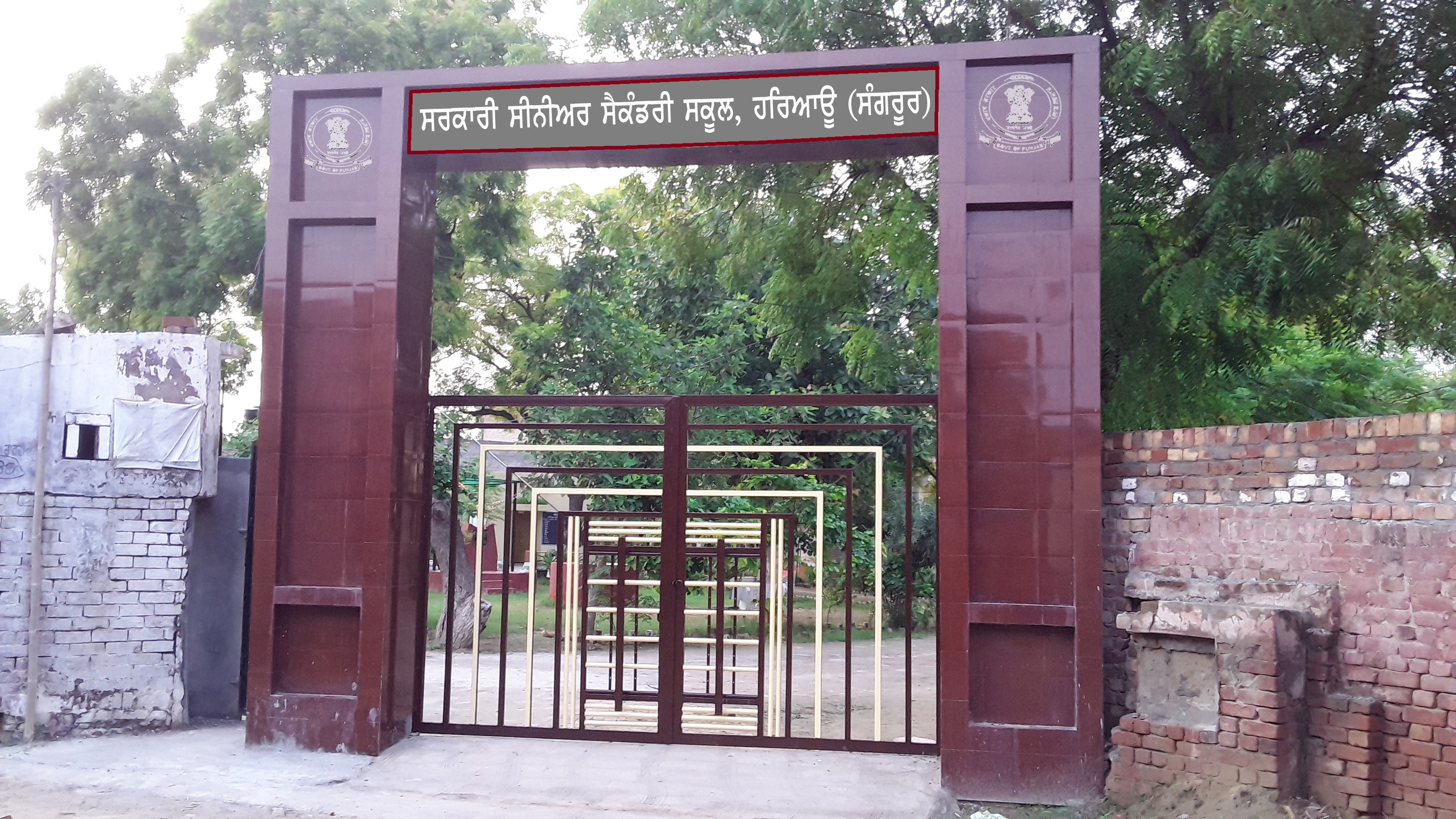
Govt. High School, Haryau

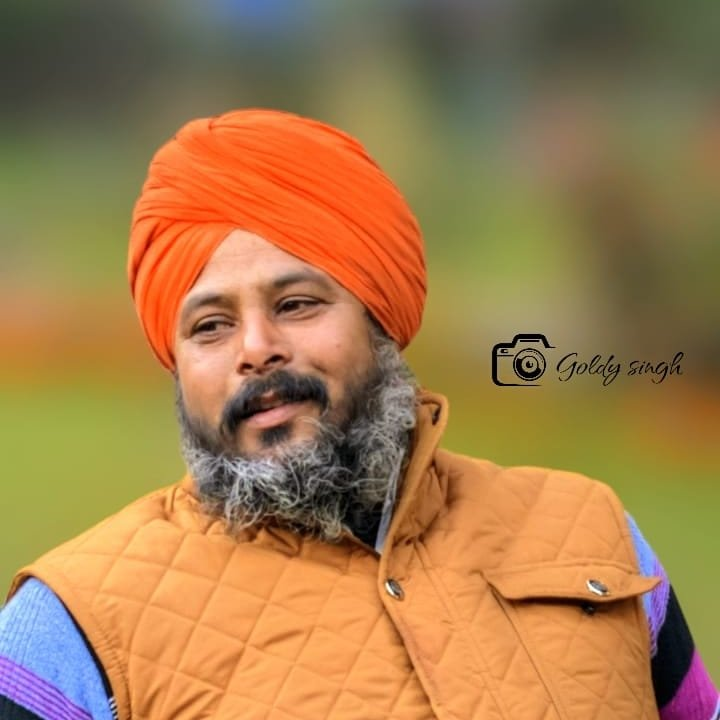
Mandeep Singh Sarpanch
