= Changali Wala =

Changaliwala Kartarpura
- village
- Location in Punjab, India
- Coordinates: 29.96088359°N 75.79510689°E
- Country: India
- State: Punjab
- District: Sangrur
- Named for: Late. Kartar Singh Numberdar

Government
  - Body: Panchayat
  - Sarpanch: Harkirat singh (Mani)

Area
  - Total: 4.94 km^{2} (1.91 sq mi)
- Elevation: 221 m (725 ft)

Population (2001)
  - Total: 988
  - Density: 200/km^{2} (518/sq mi)

Languages
  - Official: Punjabi
- Time zone: UTC+5:30 (IST)
- PIN: 148031
- Telephone code: 91-1676
- Vehicle registration: PB 75

Changaliwala is a village in Sub division Lehragaga in Sangrur district in the state of Punjab. It is located 40 km to the south of District headquarters Sangrur, 149 km from State capital Chandigarh. Earlier the village was called Kartarpura, named after Numberdar Kartar Singh. But as many people migrated here from Changal Village in District Sangrur, it was renamed Changaliwala.

== Geography ==
Changaliwala (village) is located at 29.96°N 75.79°E 3 km from Lehragaga to Sunam Main Road.

== Demographics ==
As of 2001 India census, Changaliwala had a population of 988. Males 525 and females 463. There were 174 households.
