= Lehragaga =

- City
- Location of Lehragaga
- Coordinates: 29.94°N 75.81°E
- Country: India
- State: Punjab
- District: Sangrur

Government
  - Type: Municipality
  - Body: Municipal Council

Area
  - Total: 10 km^{2} (3.9 sq mi)
- Elevation: 69 m (226 ft)

Population (2011)
  - Total: 22,588

Languages
  - Official: Punjabi
- Time zone: UTC+5:30 (IST)
- PIN: 148031
- Telephone Code: 01676
- Vehicle registration: PB-13, PB-75

Lehragaga is a town, municipal council, railway station, community development block, district sub-division and vidhan sabha constituency in Sangrur district in the Indian state of Punjab near the border of Punjab and Haryana, 15 km north of Jakhal Mandi on Haryana border. It has many schools, colleges, financial institutes, and Asia's largest CBG (Compressed Bio Gas) plant named Verbio India. An adjoining village is called Gaga.

== History ==
It is the location of Battle of Lahira between Sikhs Guru and Mughals.

Lehragaga, formerly part of the princely state of Patiala, founded by Baba Ala Singh, holds historical significance due to its association with Bhai Mani Singh. He was executed here by the Mughal rulers, prompting the construction of a Gurudwara in his memory. A fair is also held to commemorate his life, particularly his reputation for assisting the poor and needy. In that context, the Lehragaga remembered as the place of Mohan (Baba Mani Singh) in the following couplet: "lehro lehr samundar aye jaye jaha Mohan ka was; Inder barse apni rut, or Mohan charo mas..." (Mohan's presence is as constant and powerful as the ocean, Indra [the rain god] rains in his season, and Mohan [is present] all four months.)

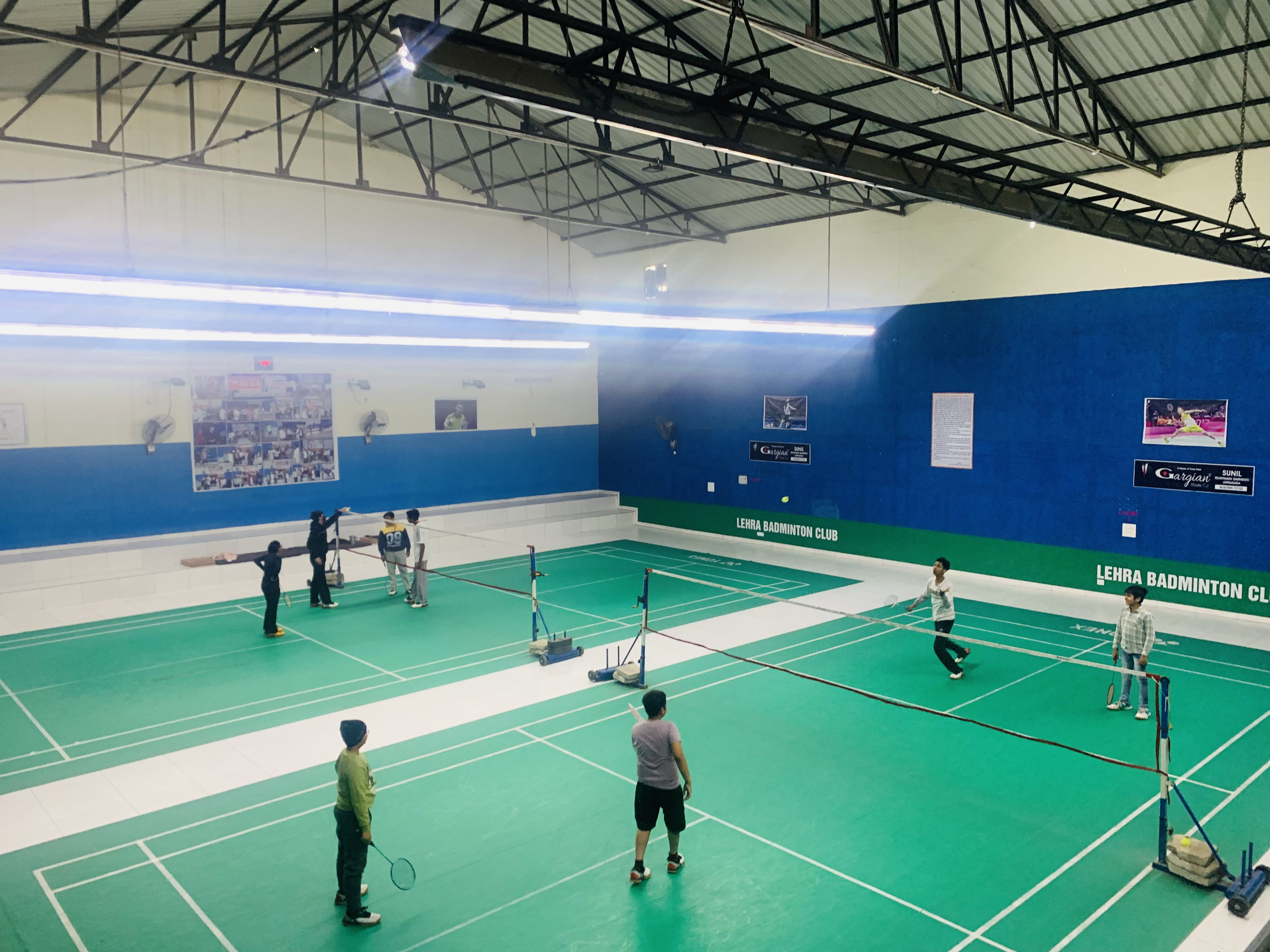

== Cultural and social ==
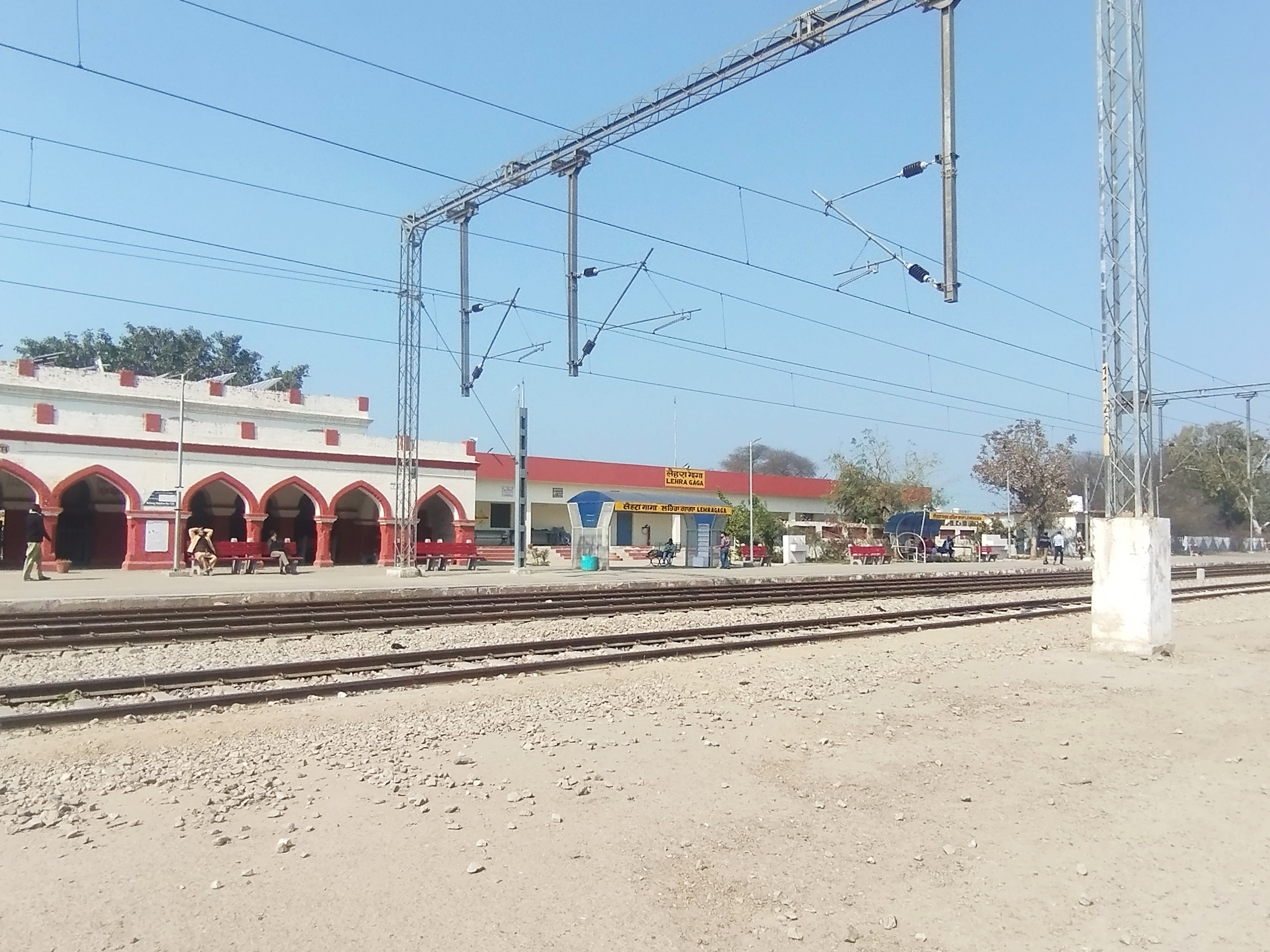
Railway Station of Lehragaga, Punjab.

There is a railway station in the city that lies on Ludhiana-Hisar railway line. This line divides the city into two parts. There is Dr B R Ambedkar Stadium in the city which has facilities like indoor badminton court, track, volleyball ground, gym etc.

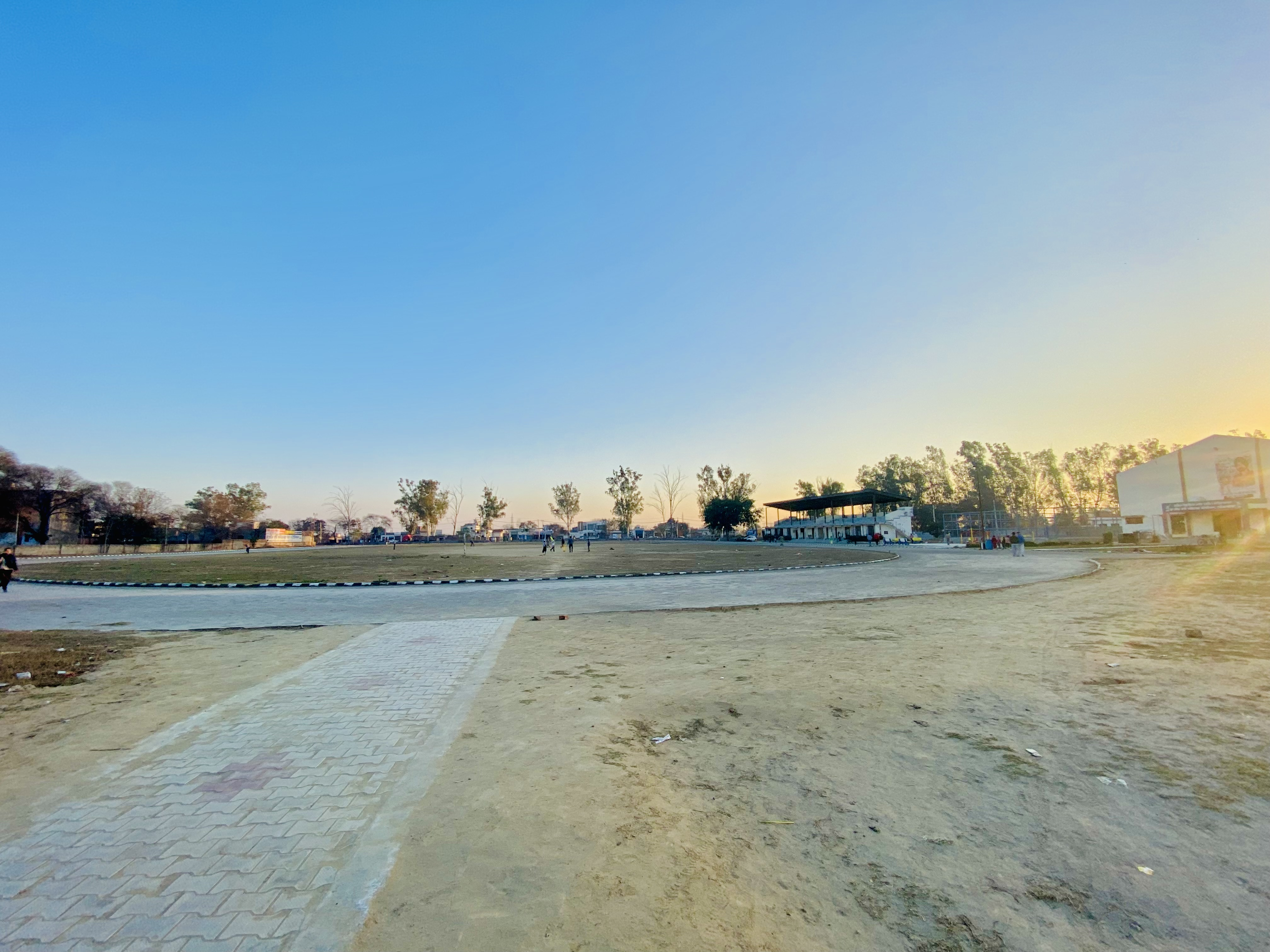
View of Dr B R ambedkar stadium

== Demographics ==
As of 2011 India census, Lehragaga had a population of 22,588 of which 12,003 were male, 10,585 were female and 2,710 under 6 years of age. 15,052 were literate; 8,621 males and 6,431 females.

The table below shows the population of different religious groups in Lehragaga city, as of 2011 census.

Population by religious groups in Lehragaga city, 2011 census
Religion	Total	Female	Male
Hindu	13,729	6,395	7,334
Sikh	8,367	3,964	4,403
Muslim	338	152	186
Christian	50	23	27
Jain	45	21	24
Buddhist	15	8	7
Other religions	8	4	4
Not stated	36	18	18
Total	22,588	10,585	12,003

== Politics ==
Lehragaga is one of the 117 Vidhan Sabha Constituencies of Punjab. Its constituency no. is 99. It is part of the Lehra Assembly constituency. Member of legislative assembly from Lehra constituency is Advocate Barinder Kumar Goyal from 2022 onwards.

== Education ==
- Government High School Chotian

== Nearby villages ==
Notable nearby villages include:-

- Changali Wala
- Dirba
- Haryau
- Khai
- Lehal Kalan
- Rampura Jawaharwala
