= Jakhal Mandi =

- City
- Location in Haryana, India Jakhal Mandi (India)
- Coordinates: 29.800768°N 75.833381°E
- Country: India
- State: Haryana
- District: Fatehabad

Population (2001)
  - Total: 6,890

Languages
  - Official: Hindi, Punjabi Haryanvi
- Time zone: UTC+5:30 (IST)
- Postal code: 125133
- ISO 3166 code: IN-HR
- Vehicle registration: HR-23
- Website: fatehabad.nic.in

Jakhal Mandi is a city and a municipal committee, near Fatehabad town in Fatehabad district in the Indian state of Haryana.

== Demographics ==
As of 2001 India census, Jakhal mandi had a population of 6890. Males constitute 54% of the population and females 46%. Jakhal Mandi has an average literacy rate of 71%, higher than the national average of 59.5%: male literacy is 76%, and female literacy is 67%. In Jakhal Mandi, 13% of the population is under 6 years of age. Punjabi is the major language of Jakhal Mandi.

== Transportation ==
Jakhal railway station is an important railway junction on the Delhi–Fazilka line. It is connected directly to national capital Delhi and provides connectivity to important towns of Punjab & Haryana like Ludhiana, Bhatinda & Sirsa.

== Agriculture & commerce ==
As the name suggests - word "Mandi", which is attached with the name of town, means "Market". This town hosts a locally significant market for agricultural produce. Having direct rail connections with major economically important locations like Ludhiana, Bhatinda, Rohtak and Delhi, makes this market an important one in the region.
