= Ratia =

- City
- Nickname: Bola Ratia
- Location in Haryana, India Ratia (India)
- Coordinates: 29°41′00″N 75°34′30″E
- Country: India
- State: Haryana
- District: Fatehabad

Government
  - Type: Municipal Committee
  - Body: Municipal Committee Ratia
- Elevation: 210 m (690 ft)

Population (2011)
  - Total: 37,152

Languages
  - Official: Hindi, Haryanvi
  - Regional: Bagri, Haryanvi
- Time zone: UTC+5:30 (IST)
- Postal code: 125051
- Vehicle registration: HR 59
- Website: haryana.gov.in

Ratia is a city and a municipal committee on the banks of Ghaggar River, 23 north of district headquarter, Fatehabad City, in the Fatehabad district of the Indian state of Haryana.

== History ==
=== Etymology ===
The town is named after a Hindu sadhu: Shri Rattan Nath.

=== British era ===
During the Chalisa famine of 1783–84, the people abandoned this town, which was repopulated in 1816 during British Raj], by a person named Rattan Singh (not to be confused with the founder Rattan Nath).

The Maharaja of Patiala State constructed a fort here as an outpost. Located at a distance of 12 km from Ratia tehsil, Kunal is one of the oldest pre-Harappan settlements and dates back roughly to the 5th millennium BC.

The roughly 6,000-year-old site holds within it a rich legacy and its ties to the past can possibly help trace the history of Haryana and the country. First discovered in 1986, excavations in Kunal have taken place over different seasons starting in 1992–93, 1996–97, 1998–99, 1999–2000, 2001-2002 and 2002–2003.

== Administration ==
Ratia is a Haryana Legislative Assembly constituency segment within the Fatehabad Vidhan Sabha constituency, and the current representative in the state assembly is Sardar Jarnail Singh.

== Geography ==
Ratia is located on the bank of the Ghaggar River about 23 km north of Fatehabad. Ratia has an average elevation of 210 metres (688 feet).

== Demographics ==
As of 2011 India census, The Ratia Municipal Committee had a population of 37,852 of which 19,937 were males while 17,915 were females. The population of the children, ages 0-6, were 4,683 which is 12.60% of total population of Ratia (MC). Females represented 911 against the state average of 879.

Moreover, the child sex ratio in Ratia is around 846 compared to the Haryana state average of 834. The literacy rate of Ratia is 72.89% which is lower than the state average of 75.55%. male literacy was around 78.28% while the female literacy rate was 67.04%.
