= Budhlada =

- City in Punjab, India
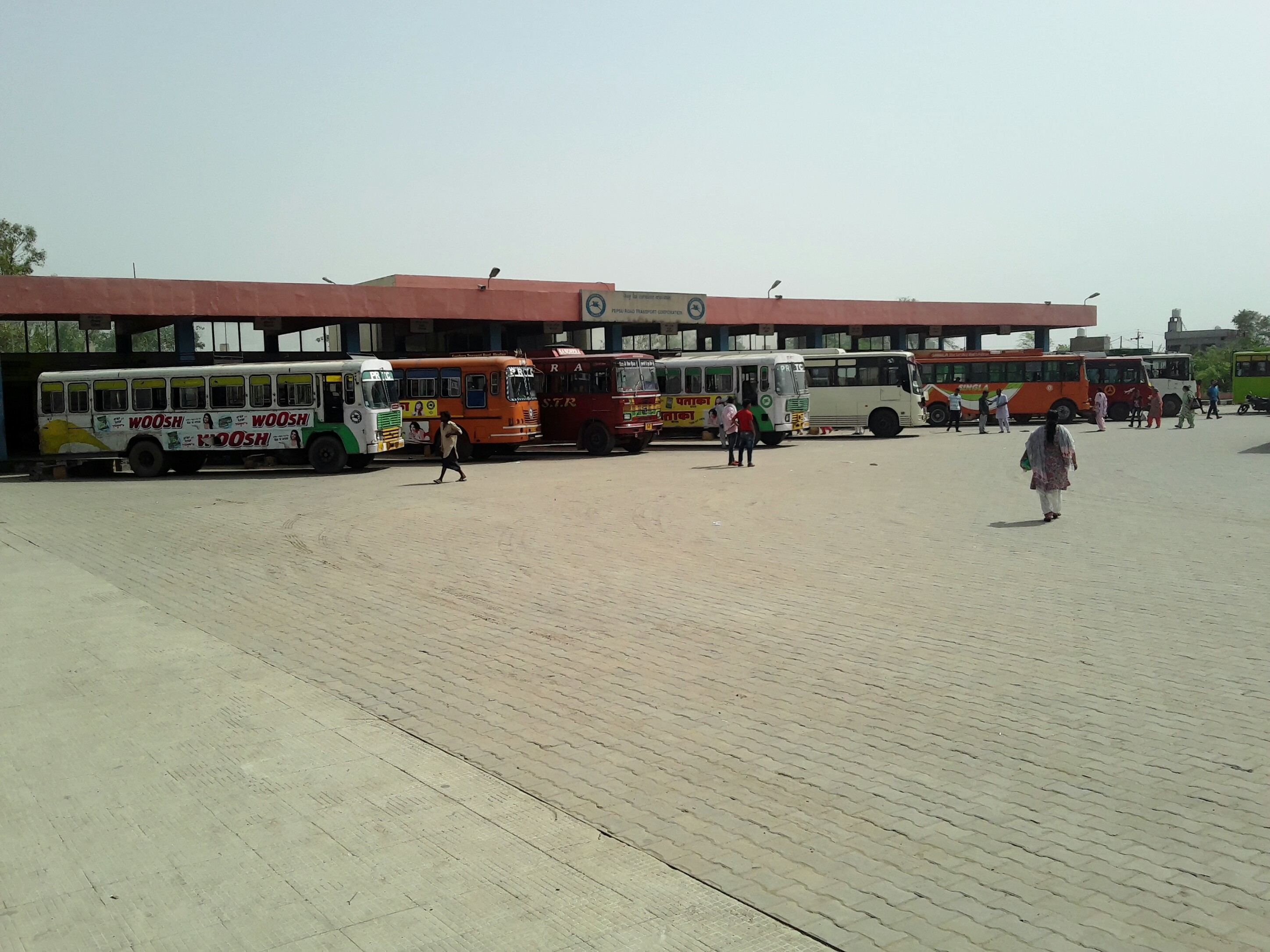
- PRTC Bus Station at Budhlada

- Location in Punjab, India
- Coordinates: 29.93°N 75.57°E
- Country: India
- State: Punjab
- District: Mansa

Government
  - Body: Municipal Council
- Elevation: 211 m (692 ft)

Population (2011)
  - Total: 26,172

Languages
  - Official: Punjabi and English
- Time zone: UTC+5:30 (IST)
- PIN: 151 502
- Telephone code: +91-1652-XXX-XXX
- Vehicle registration: PB 50
- Literacy: 80.2%
- Website: budhladacity.in

Budhlada is a municipal council located in the Mansa district of the state of Punjab, India. The area's main industry is agriculture, which provides the majority of employment opportunities in the region. The municipal council of Budhlada is divided into 19 wards, and regular elections are held every five years. It has held the status of a Class II Municipal Council since the 1950s.

== History ==
Residents of the village belonged to the Majhbi and Ramdasia communities, it was a part of the state of Kaithal. However, following their failure to assist the British during the 1857 insurgency, the village was annexed along with the rest of the territory. It later merged with Karnal District, a significant market in East Punjab, and was known for its suitability for the recruitment of military personnel, second only to Rohtak. One notable soldier recruited from Budhlada was Hawaldar Joginder Singh Datewas, who was awarded the Ashoka Chakra.

The British constructed a railway line connecting Budhlada to other regions of Punjab, leading to increased commerce and trade in the area. By 1901, the village had a population of roughly 3,500 people. During the 1930s and 1940s, it was renowned for its "boora khand" (superfine sugar), with a large factory near the railway station that dispatched consignments to Lahore and Karachi. However, this period of relative prosperity ended with the Partition of India in 1947, which cut off the town from these markets.

As of 2021, the town's estimated population is approximately 35,000 people. Under British Raj rule, Budhlada was a "riyasat" (princely state). Kishna Maur, the brother of 'Lok Nike' (hero of the people), Jiauna Maur, was arrested by Budhlada police station. Both brothers were known for their support of the poor. Moreover, Sucha Singh Soorma's village of Samaon is nearly 18 km (11 mi). Although, Budhlada is also an important center of the Praja movement, with freedom fighters utilizing it for many freedom movements, it remained neglected after India's independence. Following the death of Sewa Singh Thikriwala, the president of the Riyasat Praja Mandal party, local residents began participating in the Praja Movement. The martyr Captain K. K. Gaur, social reformer Babu Hitabhilashi, and scientist Dr. M. L. Singla, who headed the Chandrayaan program, are all from Budhlada.

== Demographics ==
As of the 2011 Indian census, the total population of Budhlada was 26,172. There were 13,832 males in the city (53%) and 12,340 females (47%). For every 1,000 men in Budhlada, there were 892 women. Furthermore, there were 2,882 children below six years of age, of which 1,599 were boys and 1,283 were girls. 11% of the total population was under six years of age. The number of working individuals in Budhlada was 8,726, with the remaining 17,446 unemployed. Out of 26,172 people, 18,680 people were literate. Budhlada has a literacy rate of 80.2%, higher than the national literacy rate of 74.0%. Sikhism and Hinduism are the major religions practiced in Budhlada, making up about 98% of the population.

== Geography and climate ==
Budhlada is located at 29.93°N 75.57°E and has an average elevation of 211 metres (692 ft). The border of Haryana state is 25 kilometres (16 mi) away from the city.

Budhlada has a semi-arid climate, with temperatures ranging from 49 °C (120 °F) in the summer to 1 °C (34 °F) in the winter.

Budhlada

Climate chart (precipitation, max. and min. temperature)
J	F	M	A	M	J	J	A	S	O	N	D
10 21 9	19 24 11	7.9 30 15	9.8 37 20	20 41 25	38 42 28	90 39 28	84 37 27	52 36 24	9.4 33 18	1.4 28 13	3.6 23 9
- █ Average max. and min. temperatures in °C
- █ Precipitation totals in mm
- Source: MSN World Weather
Imperial conversion
J	F	M	A	M	J	J	A	S	O	N	D
0.4 70 48	0.8 75 52	0.3 86 59	0.4 99 68	0.8 106 77	1.5 108 82	3.6 102 82	3.3 99 81	2 97 75	0.4 91 64	0.1 82 55	0.1 73 48
- █ Average max. and min. temperatures in °F
- █ Precipitation totals in inches

== Transport ==
=== Road ===
The city is located on the major roads SH-21 and NH-148B. The border of Haryana State is 25 km (16 miles) from the city, and the city is connected by road with Mansa 33 km (21 miles), Bathinda 88 km (55 miles), Chandigarh 174 km (108 miles), Fatehabad 65 km (40 miles) and Patiala 109 km (68 miles).

=== Railways ===
The railway station of the city was established in 1895 under the Southern Punjab Railway. It is now situated on the Delhi-Ferozpur main railway line of Northern Railway and is connected with other major cities in India, including Delhi, Mumbai, Guwahati, and Kolkata.

=== Air ===
The nearest airports to the city are Bathinda Airport (86 km) and Patiala Airport (89 km). The nearest International Airport is Chandigarh Airport (170 km).

== Places of interest ==
Budhlada is 70 km (43 miles) away from Bathinda and is situated on the Delhi-Ferozpur rail line. A popular Gurudwara Braham Bunga is located in Dodra, 10 km (6.2 miles) from Budhlada. Every year, three main संगम (Gathering place) are held at Dodra in the months of March, September, and December. Sangat from all over the world comes over during these संगम events to take laha. The city is connected by rail and road to the cities Punjab and Haryana. Budhlada may not have as many tourist attractions as some of the other cities in Punjab, it does offer a few interesting places to visit which include Krishna Mandir, Shiva Mandir, Hanuman Mandir, Gurudwara Shri Guru Teg Bahadur Sahib, Guru Nanak College, YLS Academy of Education, Jagat Resorts, Pool Centre, New Judicial Court complex, ITI Stadium and Bharati Palace, Ram Bagh (park).

== Education ==
The city has several schools that offer primary, secondary, and higher secondary education. Some of the most prominent government schools in the town include the Captain KK Gaur Girls School and Government Boys Senior Secondary School. There are some private institutes in the city for engineering and medical entrance examinations. National Institute of Computer Education and the ITI (Industrial Training Institute) offer technical education to the students. There is one government-funded college as well.The leading educational institutions of the area are Guru Nanak College, LADM DAV Public School, and Manu Vatika Day Boarding School.
