= Fatehabad district =

- District of Haryana
- Location in Haryana
- Coordinates: 29.31°N 75.27°E
- Country: India
- State: Haryana
- Division: Hisar
- Established: 15 July 1997
- Headquarters: Fatehabad
- Tehsils: 1. Ratia, 2. Fatehabad, 3. Tohana

Government
  - District collector: Jagdish Sharma

Area
  - Total: 2,538 km^{2} (980 sq mi)

Population (2011)
  - Total: 942,011
  - Density: 371.2/km^{2} (961.3/sq mi)

Demographics
  - Literacy: 67.92%
  - Sex ratio: 902

Languages
  - Official: Hindi, English
  - Regional: Bagri
- Time zone: UTC+05:30 (IST)
- Vehicle registration: HR-22
- Lok Sabha constituencies: 1. Sirsa (shared with Sirsa and Jind districts)
- Website: fatehabad.nic.in

Fatehabad district is one of the twenty-three districts of the state of Haryana, India. Fatehabad was founded by Firuz Shah Tughlaq. Fatehabad district was carved out of Hisar district on 15 July 1997.

It borders districts of Mansa and Sangrur in state of Punjab in north, Sirsa district in west, Jind district in east, Hisar district and district of Hanumangarh in state of Rajasthan in south.

== Etymology ==
Fatehabad is named after Fateh Khan, son of Firuz Shah Tughlaq, a Muslim ruler from the Tughlaq dynasty, who reigned over the Sultanate of Delhi from 1351 to 1388.

The name 'Fatehabad' is a combination of two words: 'Fateh' and 'ābād' where 'Fateh' is the name of eldest son of Firuz Shah Tughlaq and 'ābād' translates to 'prosperous' or 'settled'.

== History ==
=== Vedic period ===
Indo-European language-speaking people first settled on the banks of the Sarasvati and Drsadvati Rivers rivers then expanded to cover a wider area of Hisar and Fatehabad. The area was probably included in the kingdom of the Pandavas and their successors. Pāṇini mentions a number of towns in the region including Aisukari, Taushayana and Rori, which have been identified with Hisar, Tohana and Rohri respectively. Furthermore, the discovery of Ashokan pillars at Hisar and Fatehabad shows that this area remained a part of Mauryan empire.

=== Hindu kingdoms ===
After the fall of the Mauryas and Shungas, the Agras along with the Yaudheyas – the republican tribes of the region – asserted their independence. The Agras settled in the region covering Barwala and Agroha, the capital headquarters, from where they issued coins. As attested by the discovery of coin-moulds and terracottas, the region was a part of the Kushan Empire. According to Anant Sadashiv Altekar, the Yaudheys made a second bid for independence towards the end of the 2nd century AD when they succeeded in freeing their homeland and ousted the Kushans. This finds support from seals discovered at the Agroha Mound.

=== Jat and rajput period ===
The early 11th century saw the Ghaznavid make inroads in this area. Sultan Masud led expeditions towards Agroha. The Chauhans seem to have taken special measures for protecting the area against Mongol incursions. The area of Agroha passed under Ghurid rule after the defeat of Prithviraj Chauhan III in the Second Battle of Tarain (1192).

After the Battle of Tarain, Sultan Shihab-ud-din Muhammad Ghuri placed one of his generals in the Indian campaigns. But it appears that any meaningful control could not be established. Seizing the opportunity, a Rajput clan, Jats, a branch of Tomar/Tanwar Rajputs, widely extended their power in Fatehabad area including Agroha. Firuz (1351–88) shot these areas into prominence. The ruler came to have somewhat unusual fancy for the tract (Hisar). He established new towns of Fatehabad and Hissar and rebuilt two canals; one taking off from Ghaggar at Phulad and following the course of Joiya up to the town of Fatehabad. After the death of Firuz (1388), chaos and confusion spread all round. The situation deteriorated still further when Timur invaded in 1398. During his invasion, Timur invaded Fatehabad which was captured without any opposition from the inhabitants. Lastly, the invader reached Tohana but he could not set-up his permanent rule over the area. He soon left for Samana after looting these areas. The areas of Fatehabad came under the control of Mughals-Babar and Humayun.

=== Muslim sultanates ===
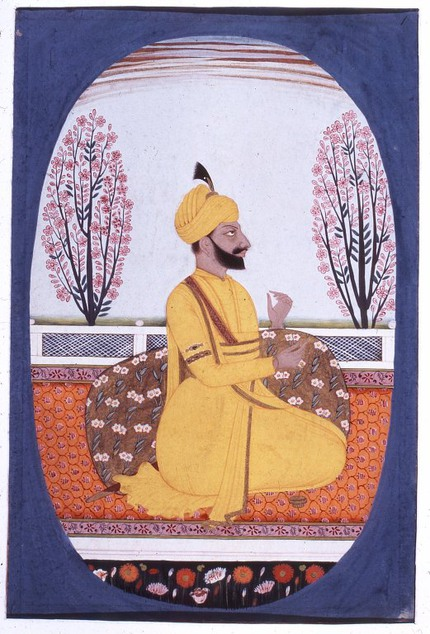
Maharaja Amar Singh of Patiala who along with his minister Dewan Nanumal laid siege to the stronghold of Bighar near Fatehabad

There is a small mosque known as Humanyun mosque at Fatehabad. The legend assigns the association of the mosque to the Mughal Emperor Humayun who in his flight after his defeat at the hands of Sher Shah Suri happened to pass through Fatehabad. Fatehabad was one of important Mahals during Akbar's time. By 1760, the areas became the scene of a sort of triangular duel between the sturdy Sikhs of north-east, marauding Bhattis of north-west and the Muslim chiefs of the south. None of them could, however, hold the region permanently except for the Bhattis who became the masters of Fatehabad pargana.

=== Jat Sikh period ===
In 1774, Maharaja Amar Singh of Patiala along with his famous minister Dewan Nanumal laid siege to the stronghold of Bighar near Fatehabad which fell shortly afterwards.

The Raja then took Fatehabad and Sirsa and invaded Rania held by Bhattis. Tohana also was seized by the Chief of Patiala. But after a treaty of Jind in 1781, Fatehabad and Sirsa were made over to the Bhattis and remaining territories were allowed to be retained by the Sikhs. By 1798, Agroha and Tohana were important parganas under the control of George Thomas. When George Thomas was driven out from here by the Sikh-Maratha Confederacy, a French officer, Lt. Bourquian, controlled these areas on behalf of Marathas. He is said to have rebuilt the towns of Tohana and Hissar. Later these areas were placed under the charge of Illias Beg, a Mughal noble of Hansi.

=== British raj ===
In November 1884, the Sirsa district was created and the same was abolished in 1886 due to less revenue collection and Sirsa tahsil after the distribution of villages was formed. In 1889, 15 villages forming a detached block known as Budhlada were transferred form Kaithal tahsil to Fatehabad tahsil. The Barwala tahsil containing 139 villages was abolished with effect from 1 January 1891 and its area was distributed between 3 contiguous tahsils; 13 villages going to Hansi, 24 to Hissar and 102 to Fatehabad. At the same time 13 villages were transferred from Hissar tahsil to Bhiwani tahsil and a sub-tahsil was established at Tohana in Fatehabad tahsil. In 1923, the Tohana sub-tahsil was transferred from Fatehabad to Hissar tahsil. In 1972, Tohana sub-tahsil was upgraded to tahsil. Two sub-tahsils, one at Ratia of tahsil of Fatehabad and other at Adampur of Hissar tahsil were created in 1979. By the end of 1978, the Hissar district comprised 486 villages, divided between tahsils of Fatehabad (166); Hissar (115), Hansi (119) and Tohana (86).

=== Formation of Fatehabad district ===
Fatehabad came into existence as a full-fledged district with effect from 15 July 1997, now having three sub-divisions, three tahsils and three sub-tahsils.

== Administrative set-up ==
Fatehabad district is a part of Sirsa Lok Sabha constituency and the district has three seats in Haryana Vidhan Sabha: Fatehabad, Tohana and Ratia.

Sub-Division	Tehsil	Sub-Tehsil	Blocks
Fatehabad	Fatehabad	Bhuna	Fatehabad
Ratia	Ratia	Jakhal	Ratia
Tohana	Tohana	Bhattu Kalan	Tohana
			Bhuna
			Bhattu Kalan
			Jakhal
			Nagpur

== Geology ==
Being a part of Indo-Gagnetic planes, most of the part is covered by alluvial soil, interrupted by randomly located sand dunes. Soil varies from sandy to loamy.

The northern part of district is drained by Ghaghara-Hakra system.

Ground water is alkaline in nature.

== Climate ==
The climate of the district is of tropical type with intensively hot summer and cool winter, with a temperature of 47 °C (117 °F) in June and 2 °C (36 °F) in December and January. The average rainfall of the district is 400 mm. The average annual rainfall in the district is 395.6 mm. The rainfall increases generally from the west towards the east and varies from 339.1 mm at Fatehabad to 428.4 mm at Hisar. About 71 percent of the annual normal rainfall is received during the short southwest monsoon period, July to September, July, and August being the rainiest months.

20% of rainfall occurs in the non-monsoon period, which is mostly contributed by western disturbances.

== Transportation ==
Fatehabad is situated at NH-9 which servers major road transportation in district.

Grand Trunk Road also passes through the district.

Cheap transportation facilities are available via state bus transport. The new bus stand is situated at Sector 5, Hisar Road and has started serving buses, but the older one situated in Model Town is still functional. Buses stop at arbitrary places in villages and towns for people to board buses.

Auto-rickshaws are available in urban region. Manually driven rickshaws and E-rickshaws are also found.

Major railway stations include Bhattu and Tohana which serve the Northern Railways Zone of India.

== Demographics ==
Historical population
Year	Pop.	±% p.a.
1951	146,650	—
1961	259,006	+5.85%
1971	388,062	+4.13%
1981	512,512	+2.82%
1991	646,160	+2.34%
2001	806,158	+2.24%
2011	942,011	+1.57%

According to the 2011 census Fatehabad district has a population of 942,011, roughly equal to the nation of Fiji or the US state of Delaware. This gives it a ranking of 461st in India (out of a total of 640). The district has a population density of 371 inhabitants per square kilometre (960/sq mi) . Its population growth rate over the decade 2001–2011 was 16.79%. Fatehabad has a sex ratio of 902 females for every 1000 males, and a literacy rate of 69.1%. Scheduled Castes make up 30.19% of the population.

=== Religion ===
Religion in Fatehabad district (2011)
Religion	Percent
Hinduism	82.72%
Sikhism	16.02%
Islam	0.89%
Other or not stated	0.37%

Hindus are in majority in Fatehabad district. Nearly the entire Muslim population of the district migrated to Pakistan during Partition.

Religion in Fatehabad District (1941) (Note: 1941 figures are for Fatehabad Tehsil, which roughly matches present-day district borders. District was incorporated to take into account population increases during the post-independence era, which has resulted in various bifurcations of districts and tehsils across the historic Punjab Province region.)
Religion	Population (1941)	Percentage (1941)
Hinduism (Note: 1941 census: Including Ad-Dharmis)	94,122	55.53%
Islam	67,556	39.86%
Sikhism	7,664	4.52%
Christianity	18	0.01%
Others (Note: Including Jainism, Buddhism, Zoroastrianism, Judaism, or not stated)	131	0.08%
Total Population	169,491	100%

=== Languages ===
Languages of Fatehabad district (2011)
1. Hindi 35.57 (35.2%)
2. Punjabi 29.72 (29.4%)
3. Haryanvi 20.81 (20.6%)
4. Bagri 11.56 (11.4%)
5. Others 3.53 (3.49%)

At the time of the 2011 Census of India, 35.57% of the population spoke Hindi, 29.72% Punjabi, 20.81% Haryanvi and 11.56% Bagri as their first language.

Hindi is the official language of the district with Bagri and Haryanvi are spoken by majority of the population. Punjabi is the additional official language.

== Civic amenities ==
Electricity is provided by Dakshin Haryana Bijli Vitran Nigam (DHBVN).

All major towns and villages are provided piped drinking water facilities. Towns and villages located in fresh water areas are served by a tubewell network. Others are served by a canal based system.

== Notable individuals ==
- Rajat Nagpal, a singer, producer and composer
