= Fatehabad, Haryana =

Fatehabad Udayanagari
- Town
- Nickname: Pink City of Haryana
- Location in Haryana, India Fatehabad (India)
- Coordinates: 29.52°N 75.45°E
- Country: India
- State: Haryana
- District: Fatehabad

Government
  - Type: Municipal Council
  - Body: Fatehabad Municipal Council
- Elevation: 208 m (682 ft)

Population (2011)
  - Total: 70,777

Languages
  - Official: Hindi, Haryanvi
- Time zone: UTC+5:30 (IST)
- PIN: 125050
- Telephone code: 1667
- ISO 3166 code: IN-HR
- Vehicle registration: HR-22
- Website: fatehabad.nic.in

Fatehabad, also known as Udayanagari, is a town and a municipal council in Fatehabad district in the state of Haryana, India. It is the administrative headquarters of Fatehabad district.

== History ==
There is a dargah in the Tehsil Chowk of the city. A historical pillar is built here, made of a mixture of sand, red, white stone and iron, having brief information related to the Tughlaq dynasty engraved on it. Some historians consider this pillar as Ashoka's victory pillar. Many others believe that this lat (pillar) was built by Hindu rulers because words in Sanskrit language are engraved on it. This area was earlier inhabited by Bhil people and was known as Udayanagari.

On 23 August 1351, Emperor Firoz Shah Tughlaq established a town here and named it Fatehabad after his newborn baby boy Fateh Khan.

Fatehabad Fort, was built in 14th century CE by Firoz Shah Tughlaq and named after his son, also has tomb of Meershah Peer who was spiritual guide of Firoz Shah.

There is a mosque called Humayun's mosque, which has the 15 to 16 feet tall lower portion of an Ashokan pillar, topped with five inch marble strip, is called Ferozs Shah ki Lat and was likely taken from Agroha Mound and whose lower portion lies in Lat ki Masjid at hisar.

== Administration ==
The city is governed by Municipal Council, Fatehabad. The elected President of the municipality is Rajender Singh Khichi. Currently Rajender Parsad is working as Executive Officer of the city and Govind Shira is the Secretary.

== Geography ==
Fatehabad is located at 29.52°N 75.45°E. The geographical area of the district is 2520 km^{2}. which is 5.4% of the state share.

== Demographics ==
As of 2011 India census, the Fatehabad Municipal Council has a population of 70,777 of which 37,320 are males while 33,457 are females. The population of children aged 0–6 is 8263 which is 11.67% of the total population of Fatehabad (M Cl). In Fatehabad Municipal Council, the female sex ratio is 896 against state average of 879. Moreover, the child sex ratio in Fatehabad is around 858 compared to the Haryana state average of 834. The literacy rate of Fatehabad city is 81.96%, higher than the state average of 75.55%. In Fatehabad, male literacy is around 86.86% while the female literacy rate is 76.53%.

=== Religion ===
Religion in Fatehabad Municipal Council (2011)
Religion	Population (2011)	Percentage (2011)
Hinduism	65,394	92.39%
Islam	651	0.92%
Sikhism	4378	6.19%
Christianity	124	0.18%
Others (Note: Including Jainism, Buddhism, Zoroastrianism, Judaism, Ad-Dharmis, or not stated)	230	0.32%
Total Population	70,777	100%

== See also ==
- Haryana Tourism
- List of Monuments of National Importance in Haryana
- List of State Protected Monuments in Haryana
- List of Indus Valley Civilization sites in Haryana
- List of National Parks & Wildlife Sanctuaries of Haryana, India
