= Puadhi =

Puadhi, sometimes spelled Pwadhi or Powadhi, is an adjective that may refer to:

- Puadh, a region in northern India
- Puadhi dialect, the Punjabi variety spoken in the region
- Powadhi, a subsection of the Marri tribe of Balochistan, Pakistan
