= Kharindwa =

- village
- Location in Haryana, India Kharindwa (India)
- Coordinates: 30.110774°N 76.933576°E
- Country: BabainIndia
- State: Haryana
- District: Kurukshetra

Languages
  - Official: Hindi
- Time zone: UTC+5:30 (IST)
- PIN: 136135
- Telephone code: 01744
- ISO 3166 code: IN-HR
- Vehicle registration: HR-78
- Nearest city: Kurukshetra
- Lok Sabha constituency: Kurukshetra
- Vidhan Sabha constituency: Thanesar
- Website: haryana.gov.in

Kharindwa is a village in the Kurukshetra district of northern India. The population of this village is 5325. Kharindwa is 9 kilometres from Shahabad Markanda and 20 kilometres from Kurukshetra. Santresh devi is the new sarpanch of this village. Gurudwara Shri kharag Khanda Sahib Kharindwa is the femas in all world. Jathedar Sajjan Singh Khalsa M. 94166 48082 Sewadar of this Gurudwara sahib. Shri Akal Sahay Sewa Society Kharindwa Hr Regd.

== Infrastructure ==
There are two government schools: GSSS Kharindwa and the Government Girls School, and four private schools, Aadrash public school, mata rukmani rai. Arya sr. Sec. School, shishu vatika and Gyan Jyoti Vidhya Mandir public school. A private ITI is based on this village. Kharindwa has two hospitals, one of which is Sadhu Ram Mamorial, a privately owned charity hospital. Sadhu Ram Mamorial trust now open a free of cost computer educational courses, only for women. A Government Animal Hospital, a small dispensary, a bank, and post are in this village.

== People ==
The people there are very religious. more people are jaat's. There are two Gurdwara Sahib, one on the Shahabad Ladwa Road Gurdwara Shri kharg khanda Sahib (guru Harkrishan Sahib and Baba Banda Singh Bahadur) A Gyan Ratan magazine publisher by Sajjan Singh Khalsa under the shri Akal Sahai Sewa Society Hr Regd. one in the village Baba Banda Singh Bahadur Manji Sahib. one musjid, and five temples. The Gurudwara is based on the top of the small hill. Four big lakelets in this village.

== Nearby places ==
- Deeg
- Kahangarh
- Machhroulli
- Yara
- Babain
