= Bir Mangaoli =

- Village
- Location in Haryana, India Bir Mangaoli (India)
- Coordinates: 30.4430°N 77.0500°E
- Country: India
- State: Haryana
- District: Kurukshetra
- Elevation: 262 m (860 ft)

Languages
  - Official: Hindi
- Time zone: UTC+5:30 (IST)
- PIN: 136156
- Telephone code: 01744
- ISO 3166 code: IN-HR
- Vehicle registration: HR97
- Website: haryana.gov.in

Bir Mangaoli is a village in Thanesar subdistrict in Kurukshetra district of Haryana, India.
