= Ratgal =

Village in Haryana state, India

Coordinates: 29.9698°N 76.8709°E

Ratgal is a village in Thanesar tehsil of Kurukshetra district in Haryana State, India. It belongs to Ambala Division and its pin code is 136118.

== Nearby villages ==
- Thanesar
- Ladwa
- Taraori
- Shahbad
