= Mathana =

Coordinates: 29°58′39″N 76°57′12″E

Mathana is a village in the Thanesar tehsil of Kurukshetra district in the Indian state of Haryana.
