= Puadh =

Historic region in north India

- Cultural region of northwest India
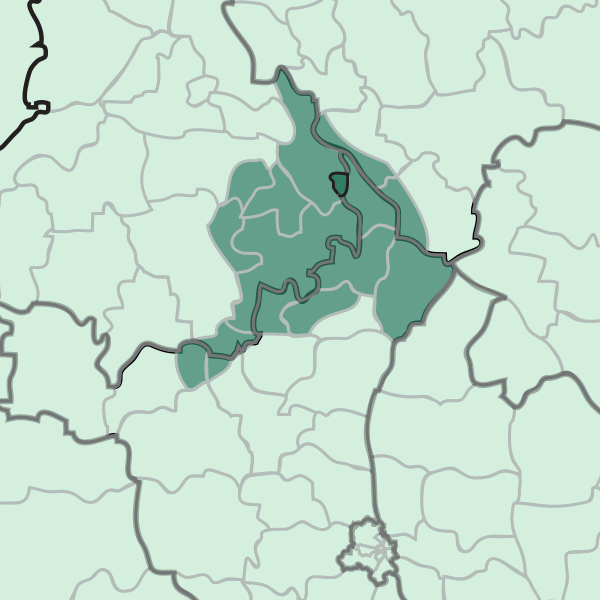
- This map shows the region of north India that falls under Puadh.
- Named for: pūrava āddha ("eastern-half")

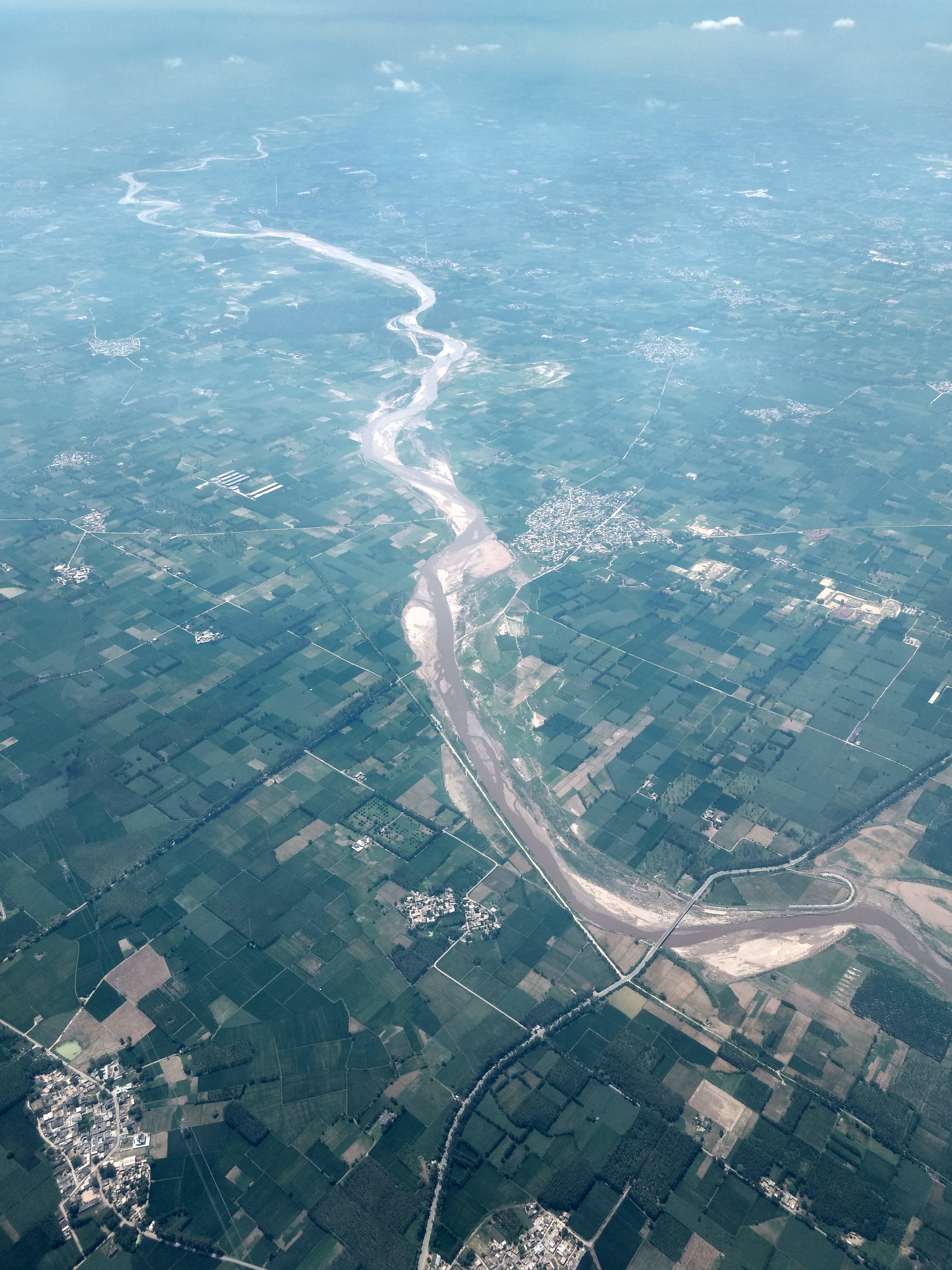
Ghaggar river Chandigarh, Mohali. The Ghaggar river flows through the Puadh region

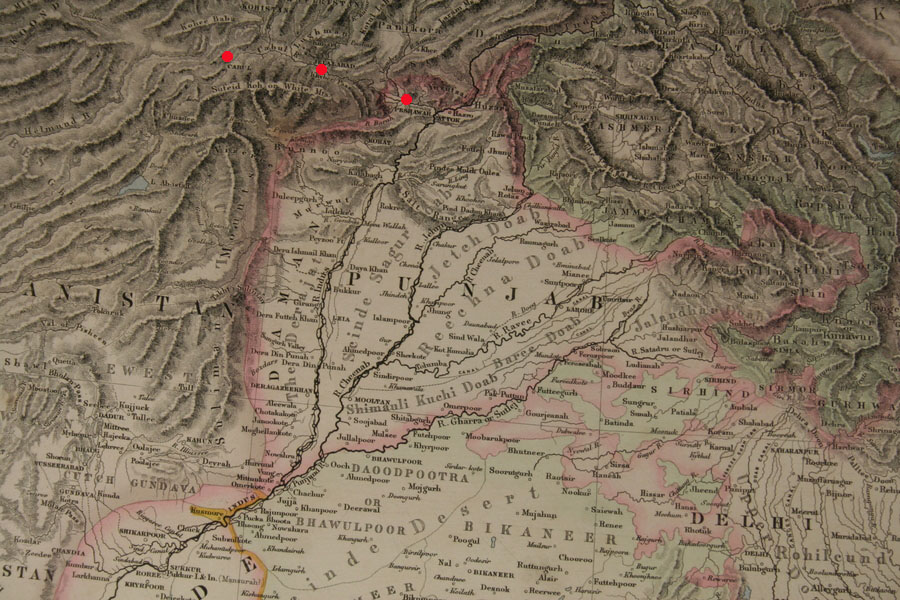
The Punjab ("Five Rivers" and Ghaggar river); a physical map from "Companion Atlas to the Gazetteer of The World

Puadh (IAST: [puādha], sometimes anglicized as Poadh or Powadh) is a historic region in north India that comprises parts of present-day Punjab, Haryana, Himachal Pradesh and the U.T. of Chandigarh, India. It has the Sutlej river in its north and covers the regions immediately south of the Ghaggar river. The people of the area are known as Puadhi and speak the Puadhi dialect of Punjabi. The district headquarters of Puadh region are Rupnagar, Fatehgarh Sahib, Mohali, Patiala, Chandigarh, Panchkula and Ambala. It is often subsumed under the Malwa region.

== Etymology ==
The word Puadh is a conjugation of two words of the language: pūrava meaning eastern and āddha meaning half. The term refers to the eastern half of the Punjab region.

== Geography ==
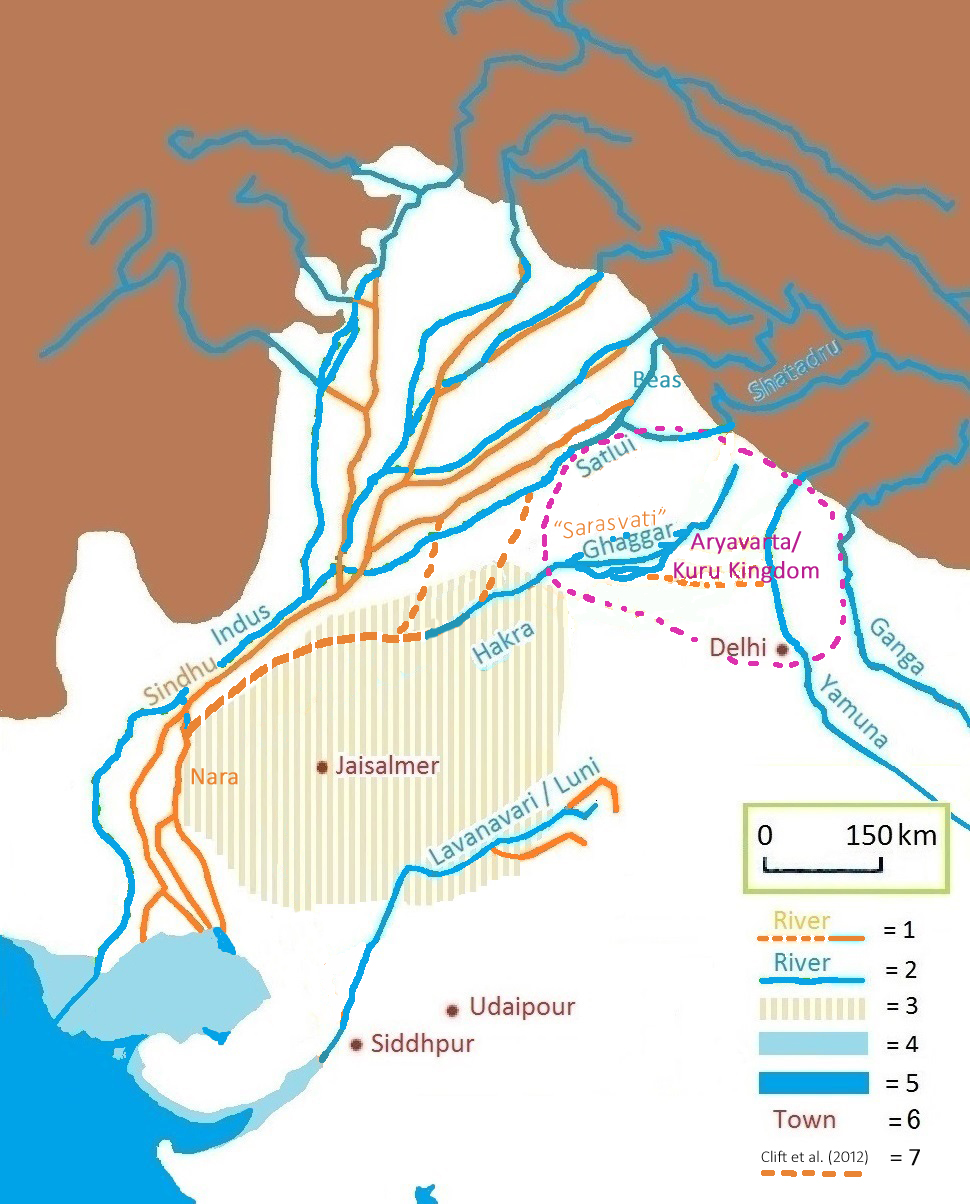
Puadh lies between Satluj and Ghaggar-Hakra rivers

Puadh generally lies between the Sutlej and Ghaggar-Hakra rivers and south, south-east and east of Rupnagar district adjacent to Ambala district (in Haryana). Specifically, it starts from the Ropar district of Punjab and spreads across various parts of Mohali, Fatehgarh Sahib, Patiala and few villages of Sangrur, Mansa, Ludhiana as well as Chandigarh.

=== Punjab ===
The Puadh region in Punjab State consists of Ropar, Mohali, Kurali and Kharar of Mohali district, Amloh, Morinda and Sirhind of Fatehgarh Sahib district, Rajpura and Patiala of Patiala district, parts of Doraha and Samrala areas in Ludhiana district and south-eastern parts of Mansa and Sangrur district.

In Punjab:

- Sahibzada Ajit Singh Nagar District: Kurali, Mohali, Kharar;
- Rupnagar district; Ropar, Chamkaur Sahib and Morinda
- Fategarh Sahib district: Amloh and Sirhind;
- Ludhiana district: Pail Doraha (Note: (which were transferred from the then Sirhind tehsil of Patiala district to Ludhiana in 1963 with Doraha then part of Payal sub-tehsil)) and Samrala
- Patiala district: Rajpura and western parts of Patiala district including Patiala city.
- Sangrur district: Moonak and other south-eastern parts of Sangrur.
- Mansa district: Bareta sub-tehsil which include Kulrian, Bahadurpur and Dialpura villages.

=== Haryana ===
In Haryana, Puadh consists of some parts of Ambala, Panchkula, Kurukshetra, Jind, Yamunanagar and Kaithal districts.

In Haryana, Panchkula, Naraingarh, Ambala, Shahabad of Kurukshetra district and Dhamtana Sahib of northern Jind district fall within Puadh. Other areas include Pehowa, and Gulha tehsil of Kaithal district.

=== Himachal Pradesh ===
In Himachal Pradesh, the Puadh areas are:

South-Western Nalagarh in Solan district and Kala Amb in Sirmaur district in Himachal Pradesh lies in the east of Puadh, which separates the states of Himachal Pradesh and Haryana.

=== Chandigarh ===
Chandigarh falls within the Puadh region. Chandigarh was carved out of the area of 22 Puadhi-speaking villages.

== Status ==
Puadh lacks official recognition, unlike the three other major Punjabi regions of Majha, Doaba, and Malwa. The government of Punjab does not list it as a region. Part of this is due to Puadh being subsumed under Malwa due to the prevailing belief that everything south of the Sutlej river in Punjab is "Malwa". This is despite Puadh being distinct from Malwa proper in both culture and language. There is also a lack of a natural boundary separating Puadh from Malwa, such as a river. Prior to the reorganization of Punjab in 1966, the region of Puadh fell under the Ambala district of present-day Haryana. Formerly an under-developed region, the area is becoming more propserous due to its proximity to Chandigarh and is increasingly urbanized. Charanjit Singh Channi was the first Puadhi chief minister of Punjab, with the rest being from Malwa and one from Majha.

== Culture and environment ==
The region has its own culture, rituals, and language that differs it from other neighbouring regions. The Puadhi dialect is spoken. Organizations, such as the International Puadhi Manch, promotes the regional culture. The region has green-cover and there are mango-orchards. Farmers of the area grow wheat and sugarcane. Furthermore, there are many nullahs and seasonal rivers that contribute to the greenness of the area. A distinction between Puadhi and Malwai culture is the rural clothing, where in rural Malwa they wrap a chadara (sheet-type cloth) whilst in Puadh they wear kurta pyjama. Furthermore, the manner of tying the turla-style turban differs between the two regions. The region is religiously important for Sikhs, as both Anandpur Sahib and Chamkaur Sahib fall in it. Unlike most regions of Punjab, Puadh is less numerically dominated by the Jat caste.

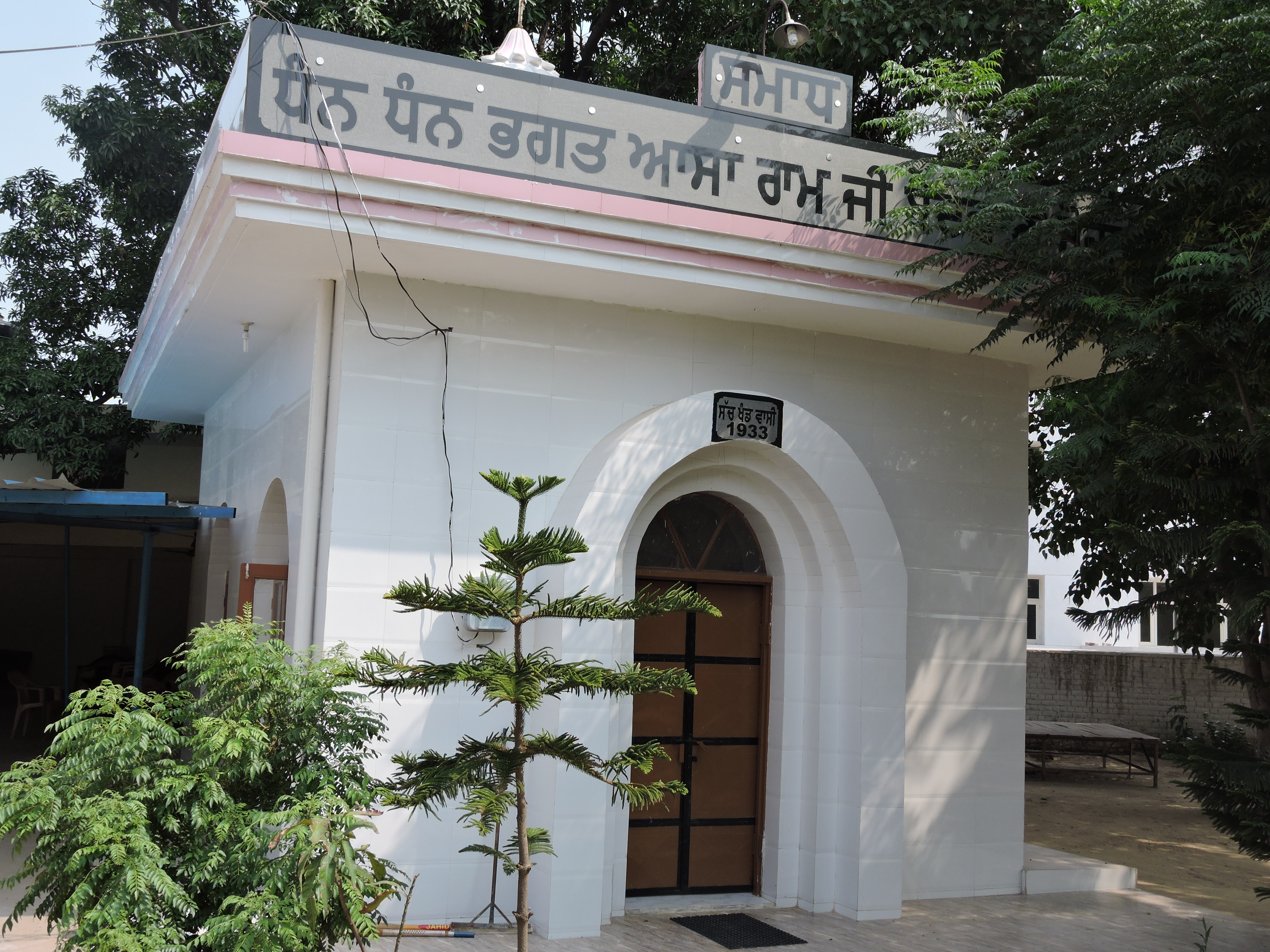
Shrine of Bhagat Aasa Ram Baidwan, the popular folk artist of Puadhi Akhada tradition of Punjab, village Sohana, district S.A.S Nagar, Punjab India

Puadh is often wrongly included in Malwa (Punjab) by the media. The region had its own poets even at Akbar's court such as Mai Banno of Banur. More recent poets include Bhagat Asa Ram Baidwan of Sohana. The Dhadd Sarangi and Kavishri singing originated in Puadh and also different types of Akharas such as that of Rabbi Bhaironpuri. Puadh consists only a small quantity of Punjab. The Majha, Malwa (Punjab), and Doaba make up majority of the Punjab.

A Paudhi Punjabi folk song

== Puadhi language ==
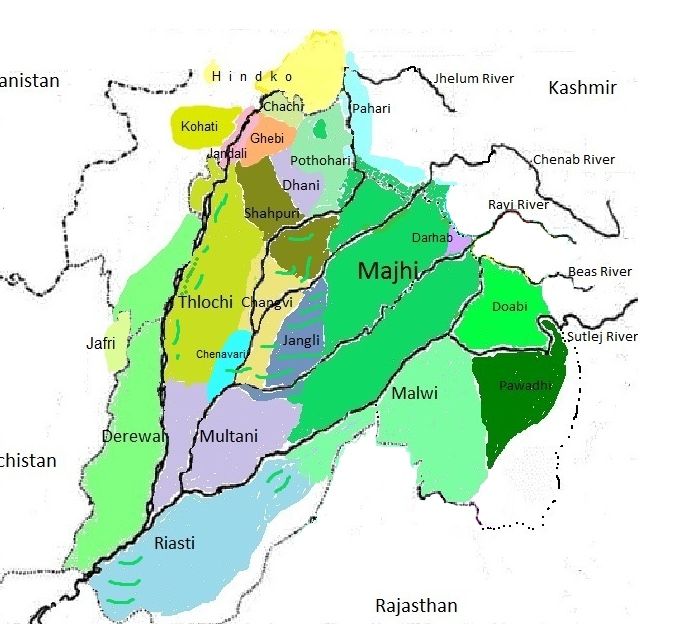
Map of Punjabi dialects in Punjab region

The dialect of the Punjabi language spoken in Puadh is called Puadhi. It is spoken by the people of Chandigarh, in Mohali district; few villages, Baltana and Zirakpur, in Patiala district; Rajpura, Ghanaur, Devigarh and Banur, some parts of Ropar district, southern villages of Sangrur such as Moonak, in Mansa district; Bareta sub-tehsil whereas in Haryana in North-western villages of Ambala district and in Tohana in Fatehabad district, in Shahbad Markanda and Ismailabad in Kurukshetra district, in Panchkula district's areas of Barwala and Raipur Rani and it is also spoken in Himachal Pradesh in southern villages of Nalagarh in Solan district and in Kala Amb of Sirmaur district.

== Gallery ==
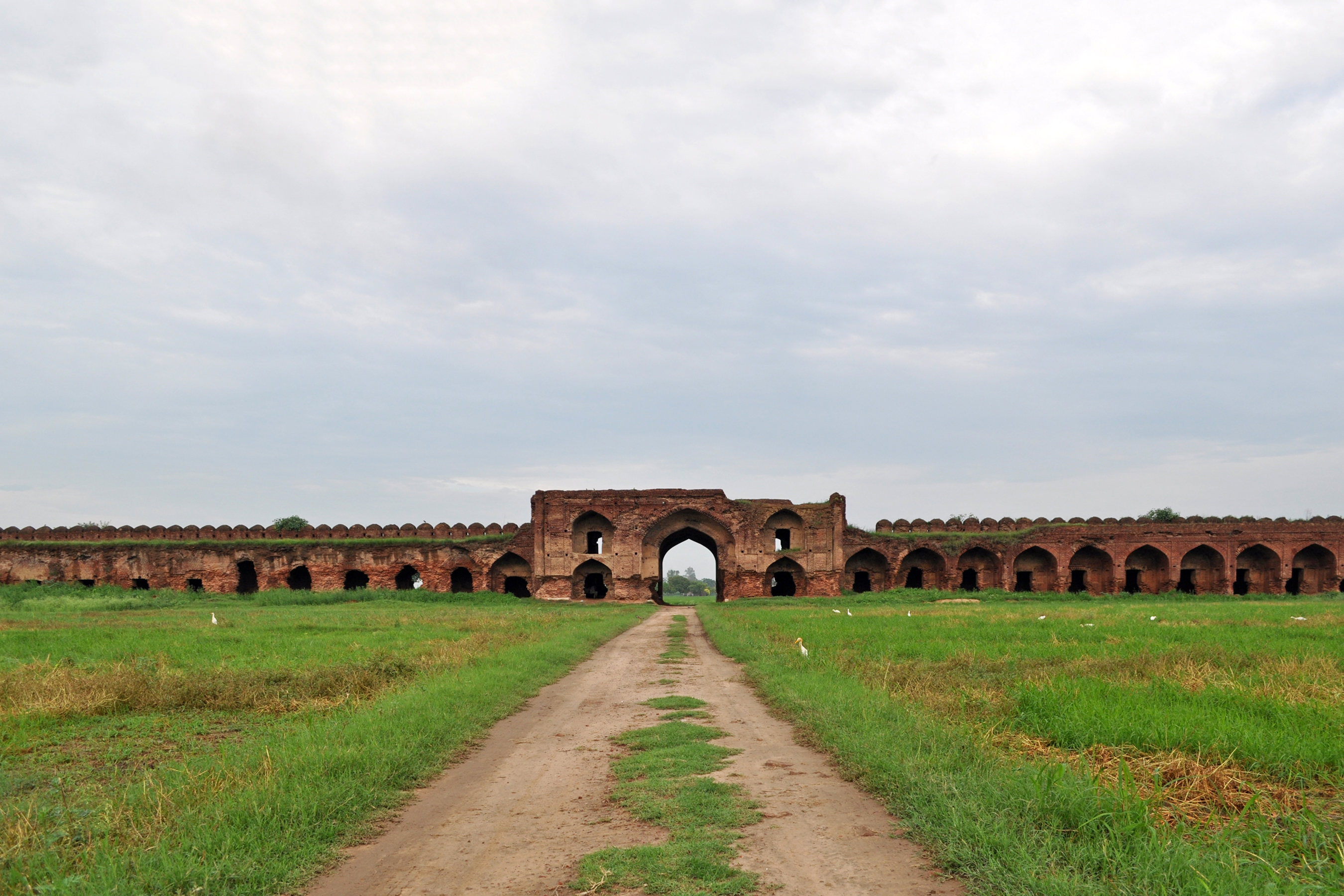
Sarai Lashkari (Doraha)

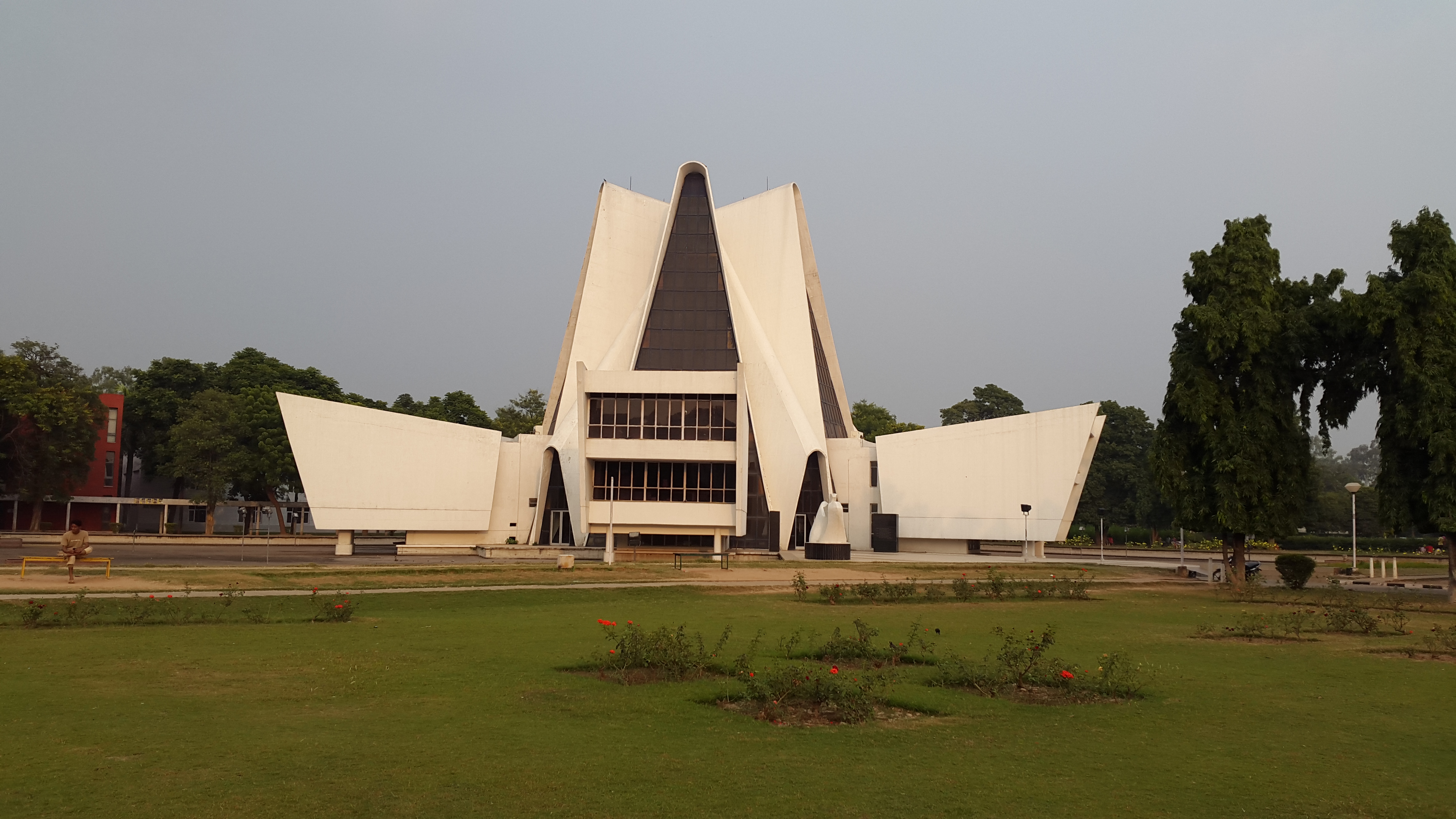
Guru Gobind Singh Bhawan. Punjabi University, Patiala

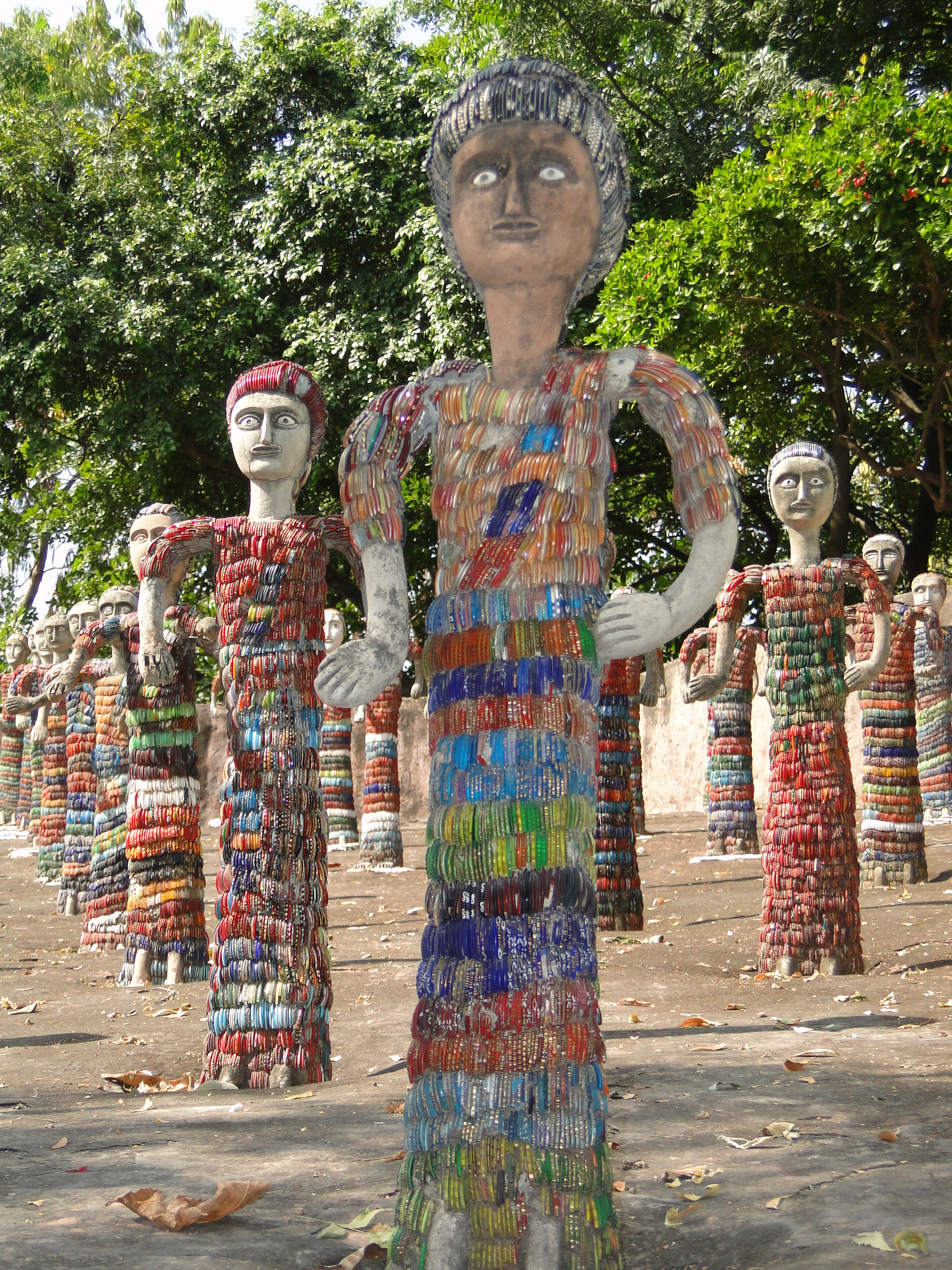
Statues made of waste Bangles at Rock Garden, Chandigarh

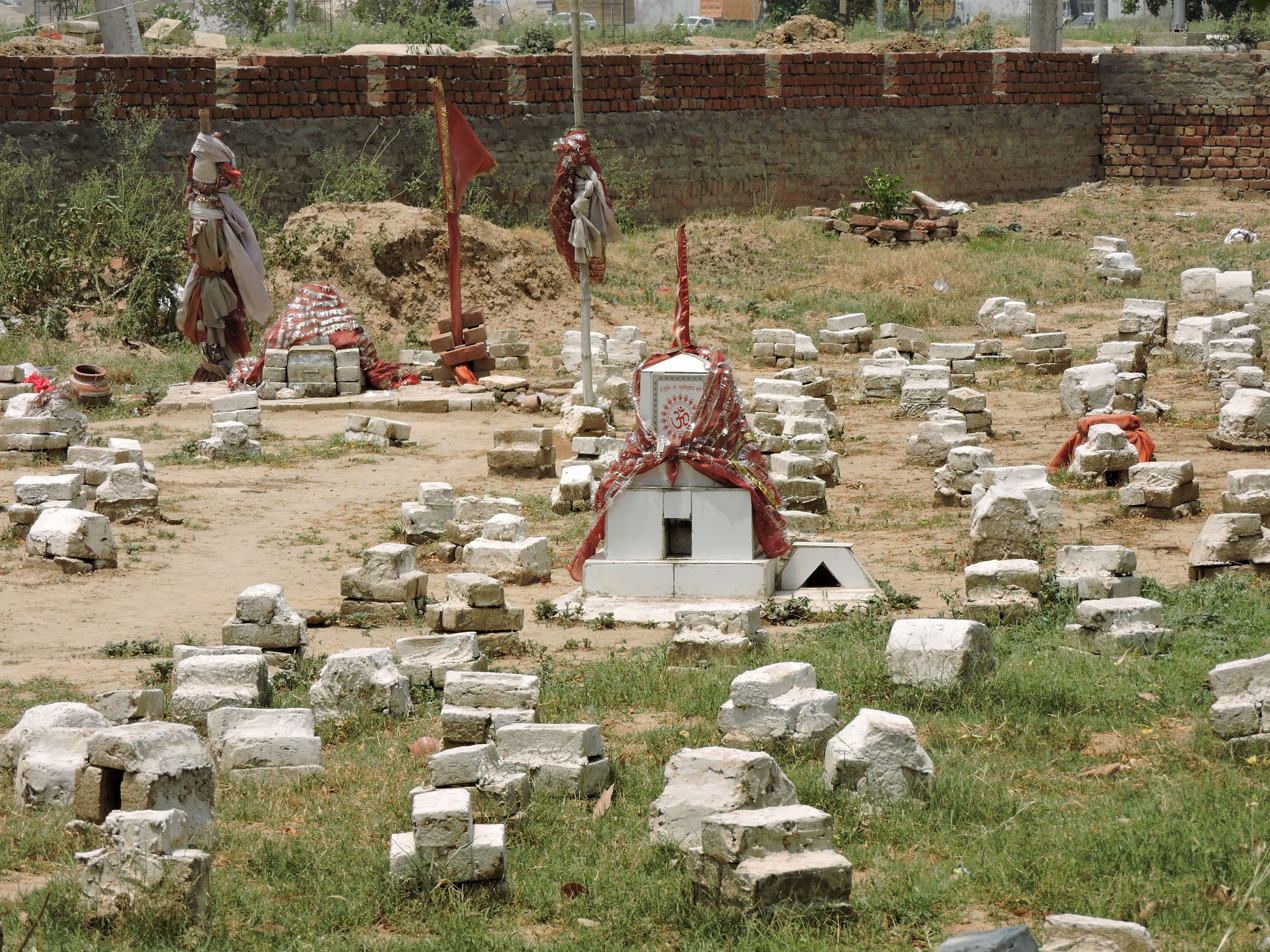
Thaan (shrine) in Dera village Bakarpur, Mohali

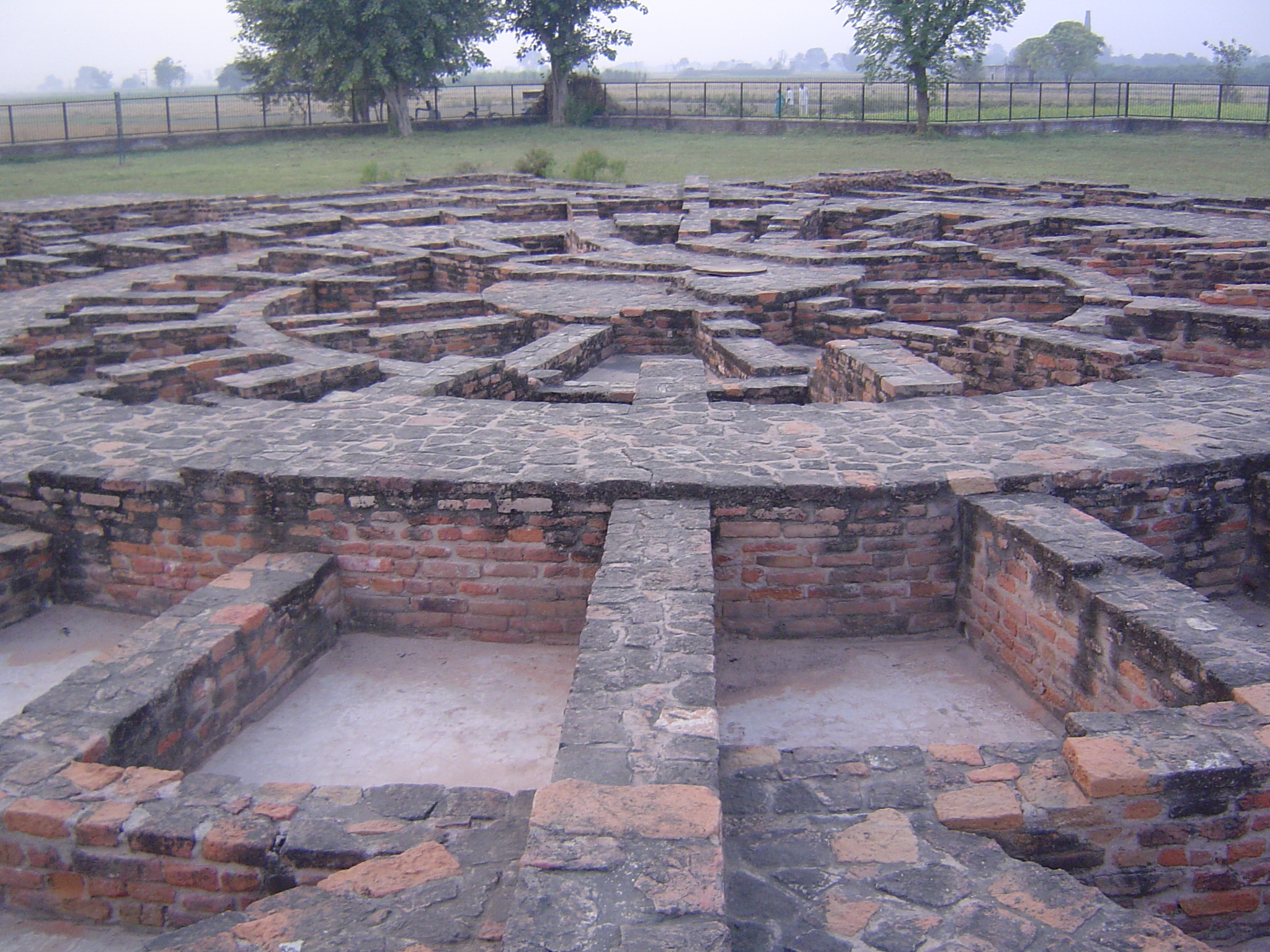
Stupa Base, Sanghol (Fategarh Sahib district)

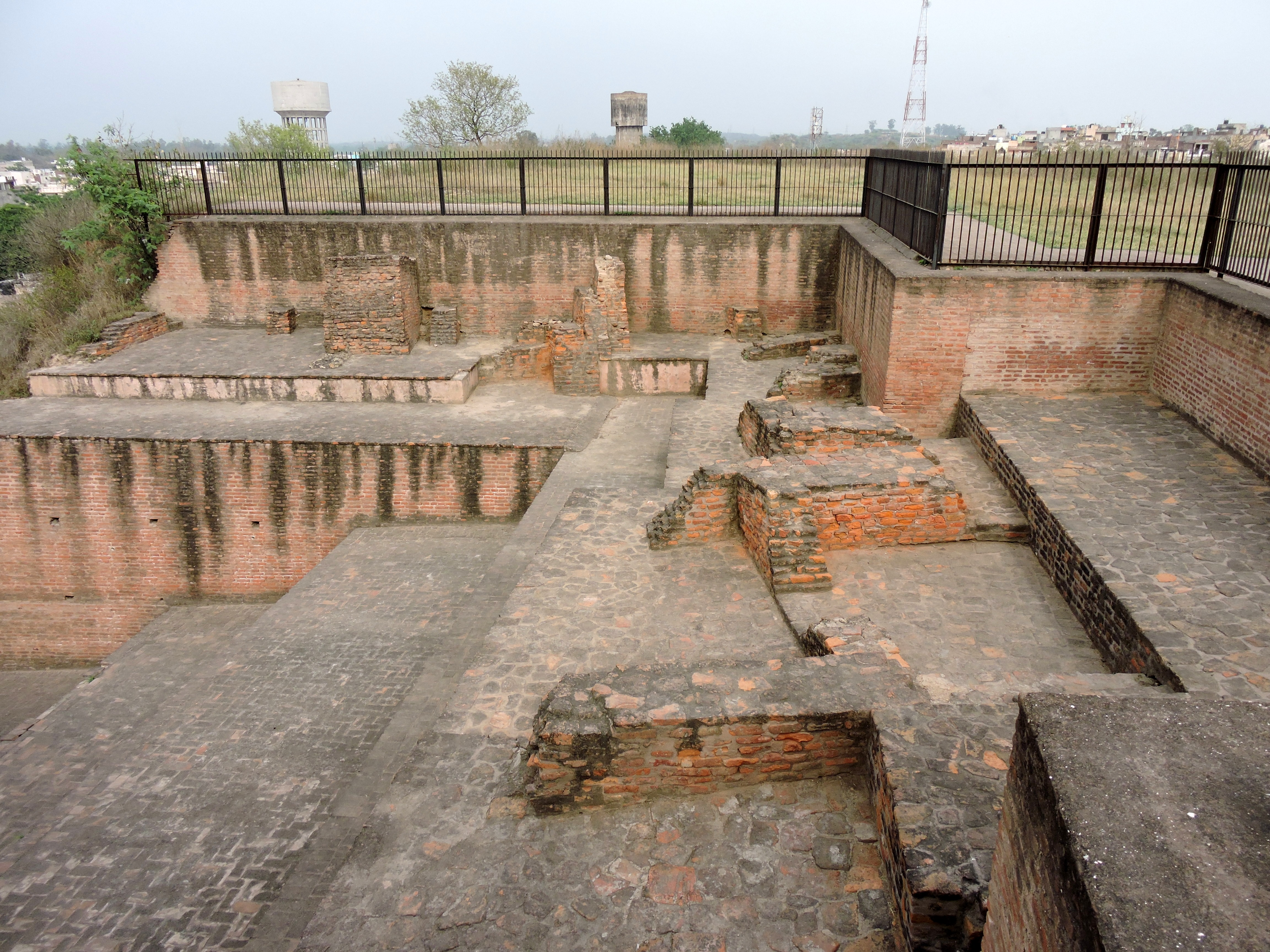
Ruins of Indus Valley Civilization, Punjab (Rupnagar)

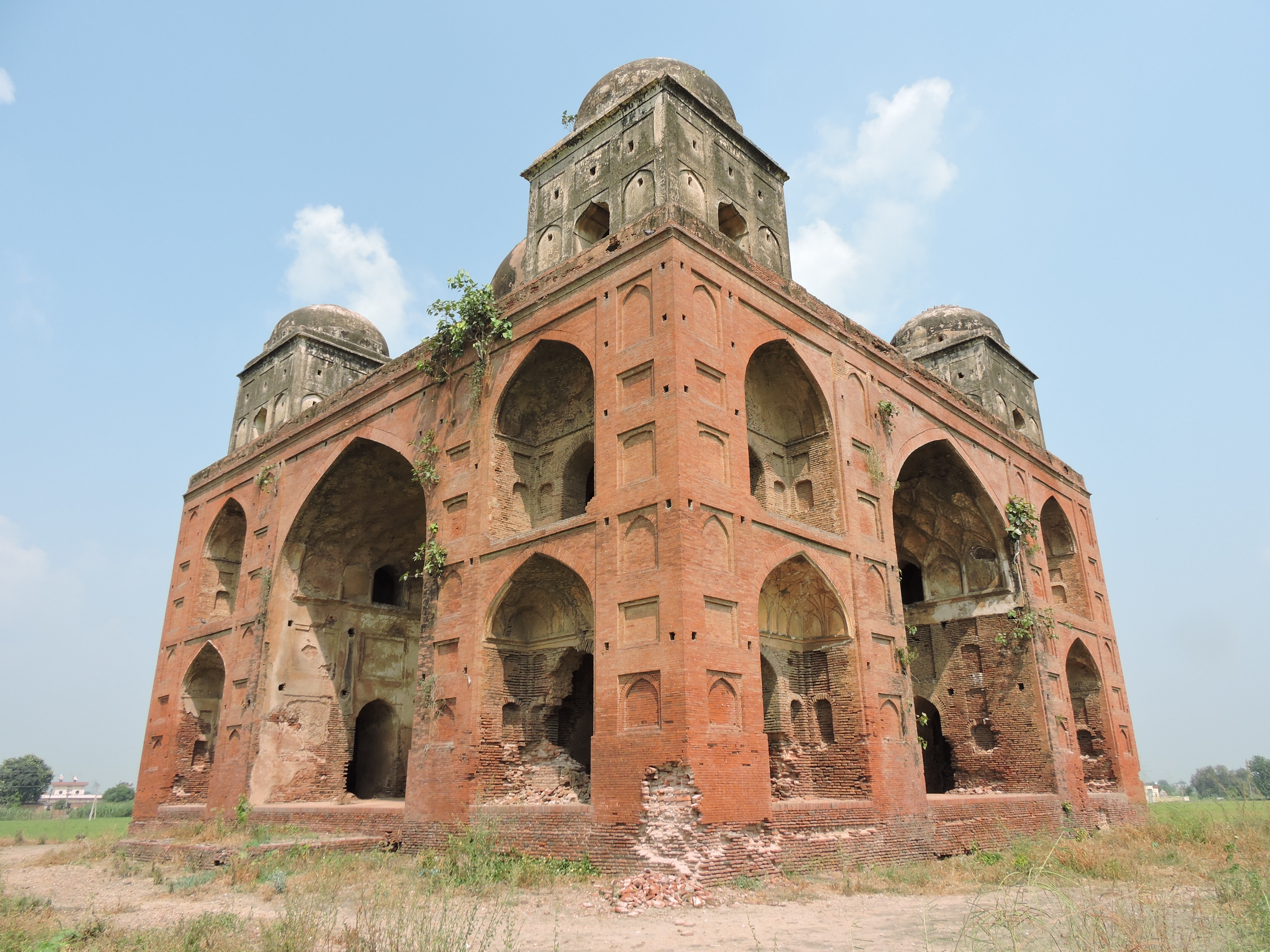
Tomb of Shagird village Talania Sirhind

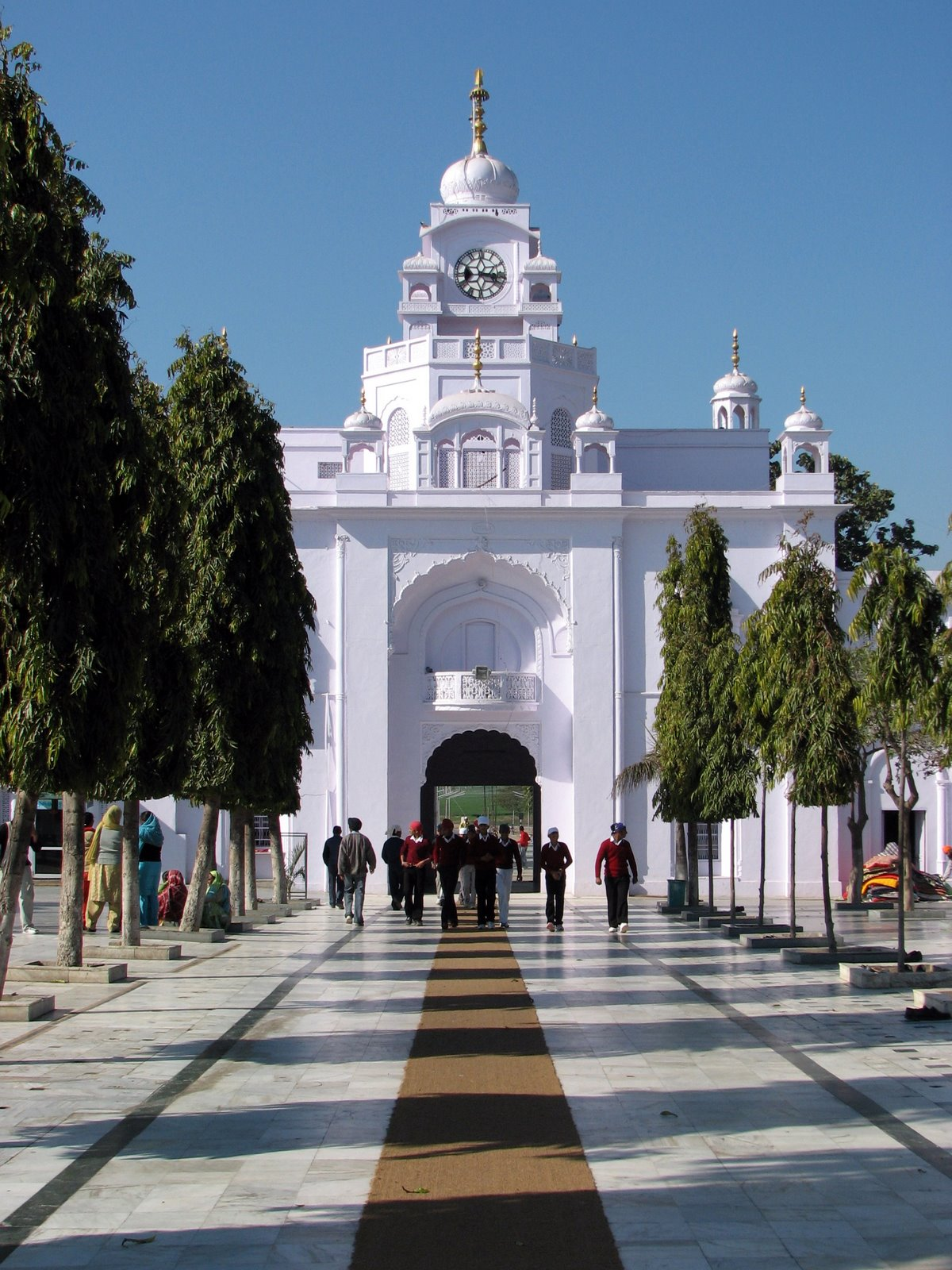
Fatehgarh Sahib Gurdwara, Punjab, India

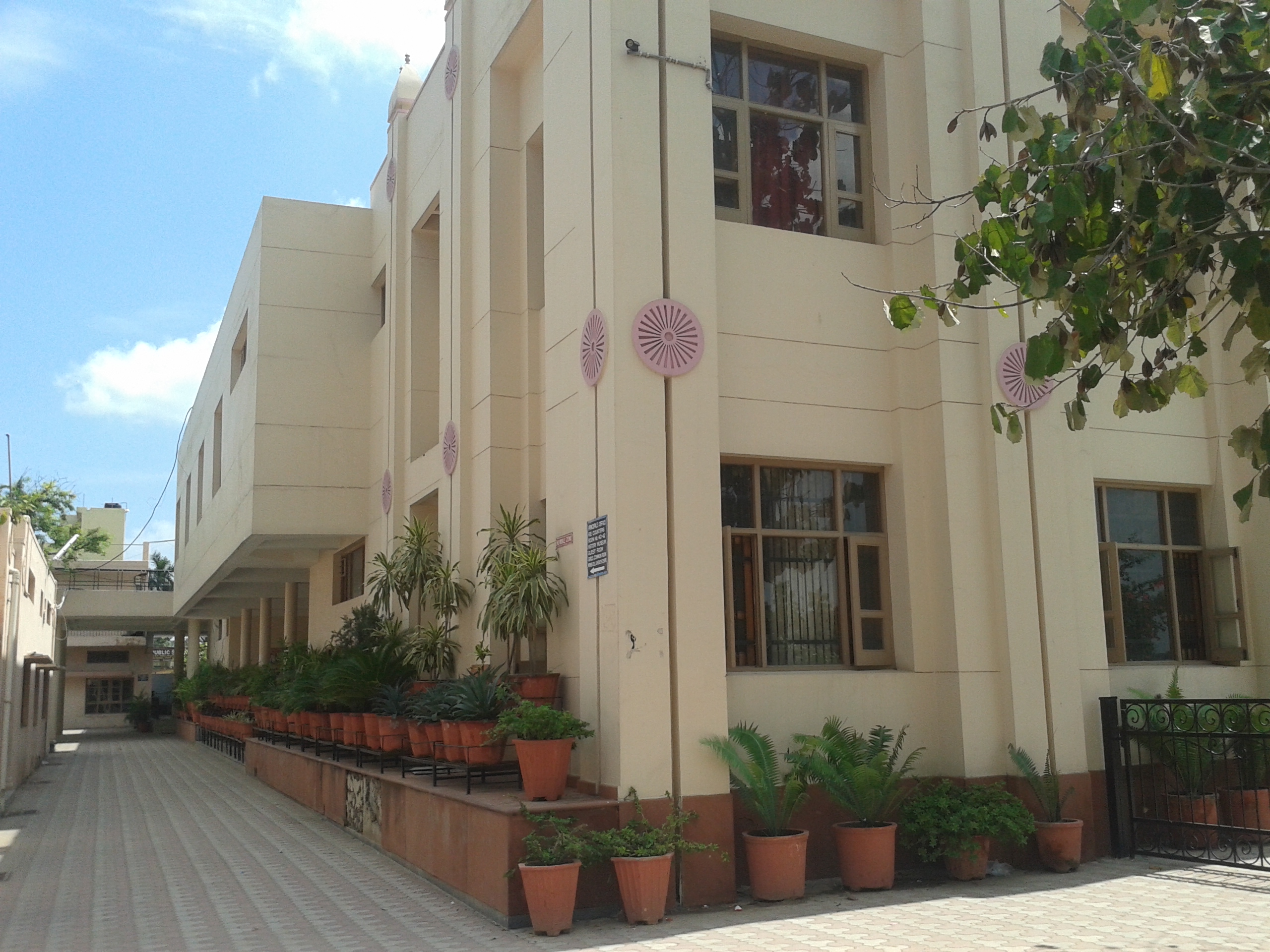
SD College, Ambala

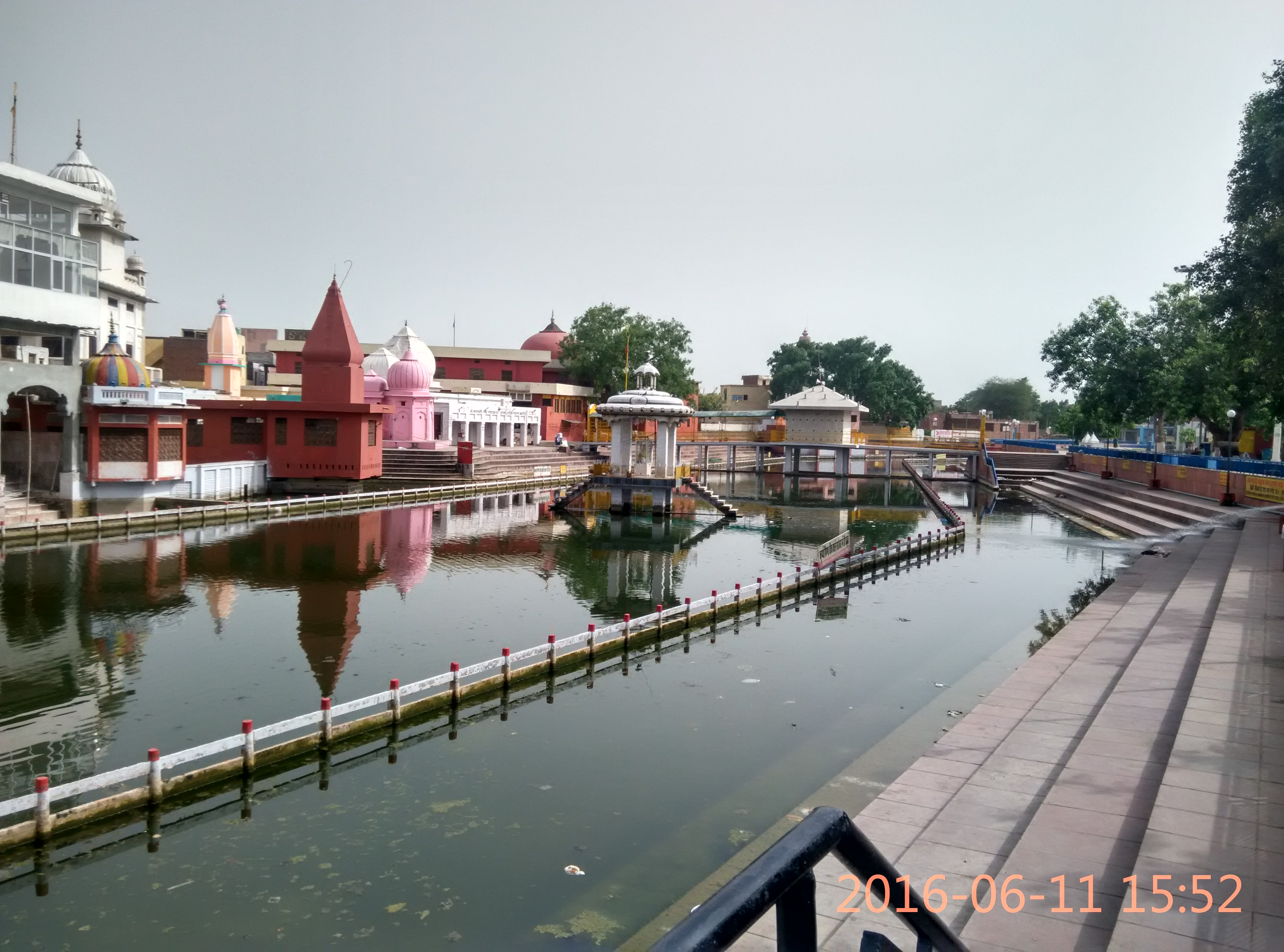
Mandir in Pehowa, Haryana

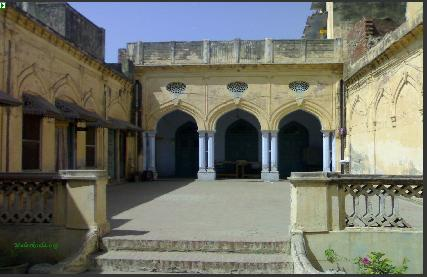
NSMK Institute of Advanced Studies, Malerkotla

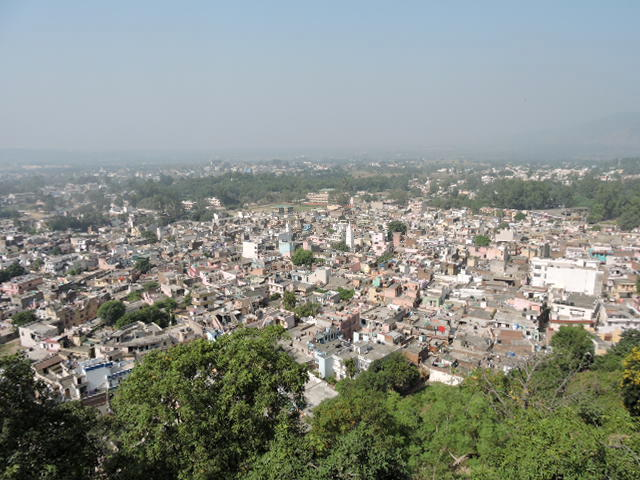
View of city from the Palace Nalagarh Princely State

== See also ==
- Puadhi dialect
- Doaba
- Malwa
- Majha
- Mahasu region
