= Bir Pwahad =

- Village
- Location in Punjab, India Bir Pwahad (India)
- Coordinates: 31°14′25.37″N 75°47′30.84″E
- Country: India
- State: Punjab
- District: Kapurthala
- Tehsil: Phagwara
- Region: Doaba

Government
  - Type: Panchayat raj
  - Body: Gram panchayat

Area
  - Total: 159 ha (390 acres)

Population (2011)
  - Total: 440; 225/215 ♂/♀
  - Scheduled Castes: 249; 128/121 ♂/♀
  - Total Households: 87

Languages
  - Official: Punjabi
- Time zone: UTC+5:30 (IST)
- ISO 3166 code: IN-PB
- Website: kapurthala.gov.in

Bir Pwahad is a village in Phagwara in Kapurthala district of Punjab State, India. It is located 5 kilometres (3.1 mi) from sub-district headquarters and 42 kilometres (26 mi) from district headquarters. The village is administrated by Sarpanch an elected representative of the village.

== Demography ==
As of 2011, The village has a total number of 87 houses and a population of 440 of which 225 are males while 215 are females. According to the report published by Census India in 2011, out of the total population of the village 249 people are from Schedule Caste and the village does not have any Schedule Tribe population so far.

== See also ==
- List of villages in India
