= Doaba =

Region of Punjab, India

Coordinates: 31°20′N 76°10′E

- Cultural region of Punjab
- Map
- Named for: Doab

Doaba, also known as Bist Doab or the Jalandhar Doab, is the region of Punjab, India that lies between the Beas River and the Sutlej River. People of this region are given the demonym Doabia. The dialect of Punjabi spoken in Doaba is called Doabi. The term "Doaba" or "Doab" is derived from Persian دو آب (do āb, literally "two bodies of water"), and signifies a region lying between and reaching to the confluence of two rivers. The river Sutlej separates Doaba from the Malwa region of India to its south and the river Beas separates Doaba from the Majha region, split between present day Pakistan and India, to its north.

Scheduled castes form more than 40% of the population in Doaba. This area is also called the NRI hub of Punjab as a consequence of the foreign migration of a significant percentage of Doabias, with diasporic Doabi populations living in North America, Europe, and the Middle East.

== Etymology ==
The word doaba is derived from 'do' meaning "two" and 'aab' meaning "water" or "river". This word has come to refer to this area between two rivers or "land of two rivers".

== Geography ==
Doaba is defined as the tract of land between the Satluj and Beas rivers.

=== Districts of Doaba ===
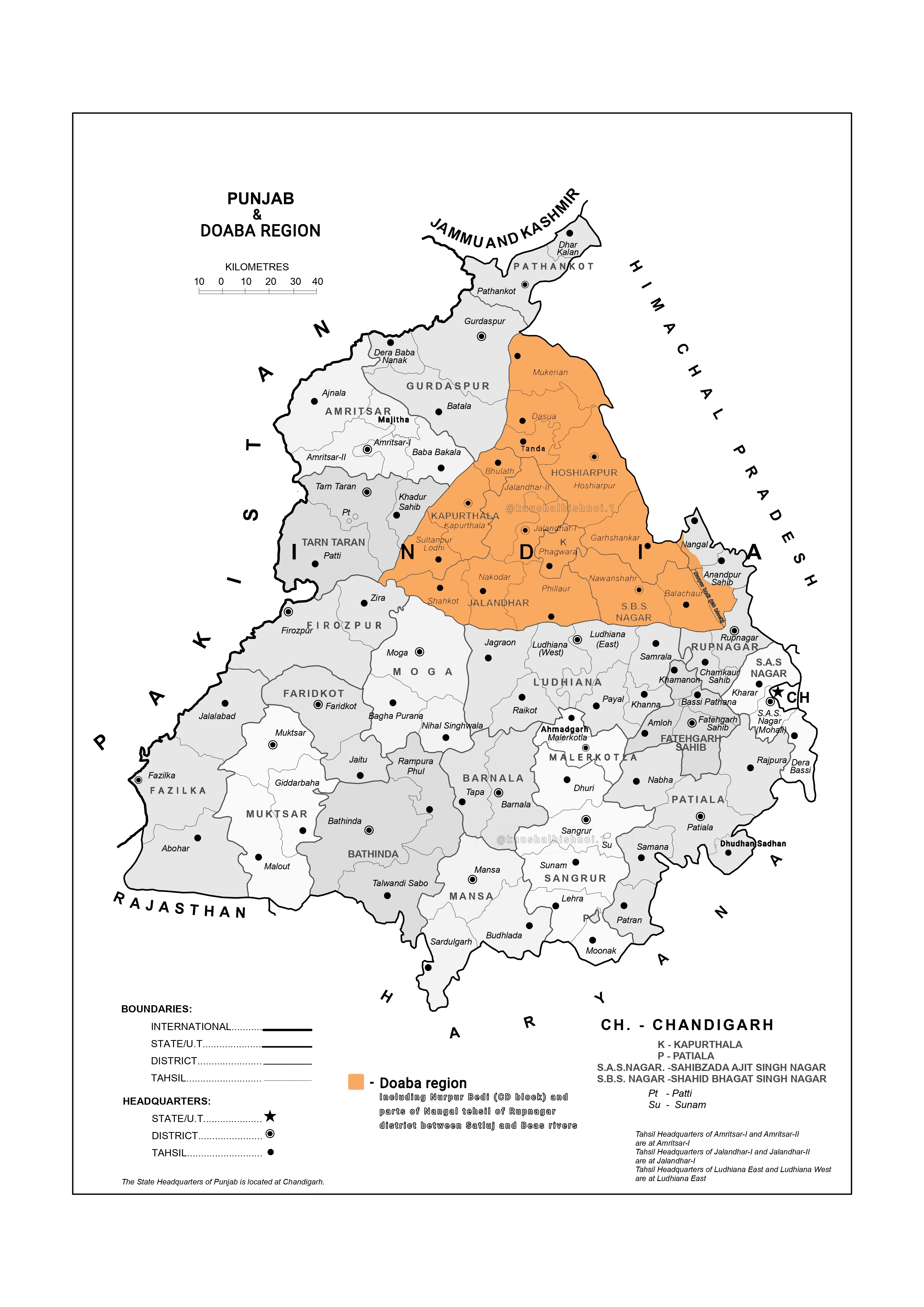
Doaba region of Punjab, India including parts of Rupnagar district

Doaba comprises the following districts:

- Hoshiarpur
- Kapurthala
- Jalandhar
- Shaheed Bhagat Singh Nagar

== Sub-divisions ==
=== Manjki ===
Manjki includes a large part of Nakodar tehsil, western parts of Goraya sub tehsil, Noormahal sub tehsil and western parts of Phillaur tehsil. The villages of Jandiala Manjki, and Bundala lie in Manjki. The south east of Phagwara also falls within Manjki.

It is not clear if the area takes its name from the Manj tribe which once held the track around Nakodar or the name is related to the condition of the land. The Manj Rajputs held a large tract in the south west of Jallandhar district stretching between Talwan, Nakodar and Malsian (to the west of Nakodar city).

The Arains were mainly settled in Phagwara, Nakodar, Kotla Nihang, Daulatpur and Noorpur. They were landholders of big agricultural tracts in the region. After partition almost all Arain population migrated from Jalandhar to Faisalabad (formerly Lyallpur), Bahawalpur, Rawalpindi and Lahore districts of Pakistan.

Hinduism and Sikhism are the main religions of the region. Before partition, the area had a sizeable Muslim majority, which led the Muslim League to hope that the Jalandhar division would be allotted to Pakistan. The majority of Muslims of this area after partition moved to the Faisalabad (formerly Lyallpur) district of Pakistan, and a small minority opted instead for the urban centers of Lahore and Rawalpindi. Some Sikhs and Hindus from the Lyallpur district were relocated in the Doaba region, especially in Manjki.

=== Dhak ===
The area known as Dhak includes the eastern part of Phillaur tehsil and Nawanshahr district. The Grand Trunk road separates the Dhak area from the Manjki area. The middle part of Phagwara tehsil is in Dhak.

Phagwara tehsil includes the Dhak area. The type of soil has traditionally been midway between clay loan or loamy clay and therefore the traditional main crop rotations were maize-wheat, paddy-wheat, sugarcane-wheat, and fodder-wheat, cotton-wheat.

=== Dona ===
The word 'Dona' means that the soil is formed of two constituents, sand and clay, with sand predominating. The area to the south of the river Beas falls within Dona. This area is formed by a part of the Kapurthala district.

Due to the type of soil in Dona, the main crop rotations traditionally being followed were: groundnut-wheat, groundnut-fallow, maize-wheat, cotton-wheat, and fodder-wheat.

=== Bet ===
The portion of Doaba that lies in the area between the river tract falling between the Beas and Black Bein is called "Bet".

The soil in Bet is clay loam or loamy or clay, and therefore the main crop rotations traditionally being followed were: paddy-wheat, maize-wheat, fodder-wheat, and toria-wheat.

=== Sirowal ===
The north eastern part of Phagwara tehsil lies in the Sirowal (also called Sirwal) region. Bhogpur and Adampur Blocks of Jalandhar district also lie in Sirowal.

Sirowal is characteristic of the Bet area with numerous hill streams coming down from Hoshiarpur district keeping the soil moist year round. Some of these streams are silt laden and at first deposit fertile soil though their later deposits are more and more sandy. Due to the existence of these drainage channels patches and stratas of hard clay are also to be found.

== Places ==
=== Dasuya ===
The town is referred to in the ancient Indian epic, the Mahabharata, as the seat of king Virata. In recognition of this, Dasuya is still referred to as Virat Ki Nagri today.

== Gallery ==
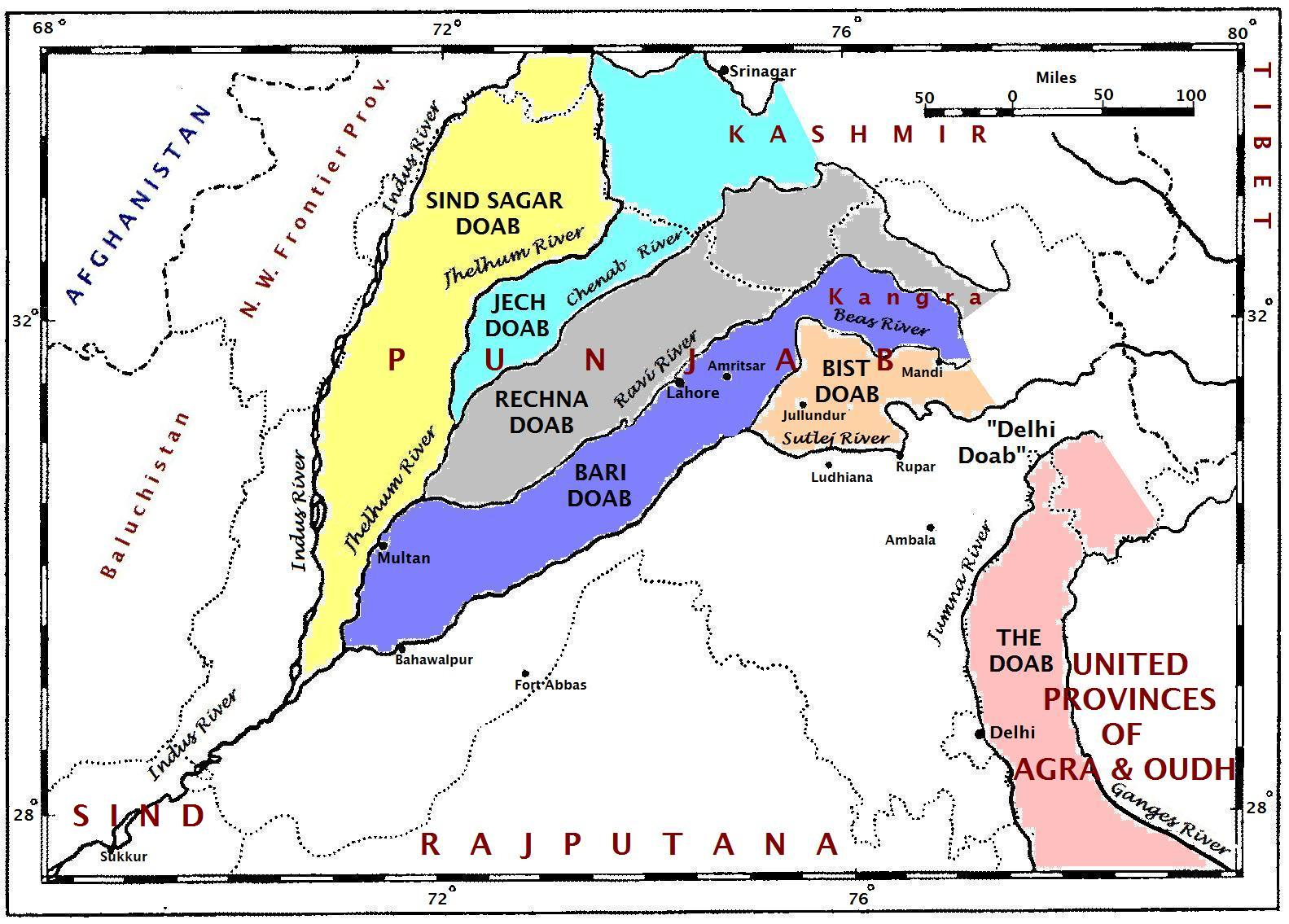
A map of the Punjab region c. 1947 showing the different doabs.

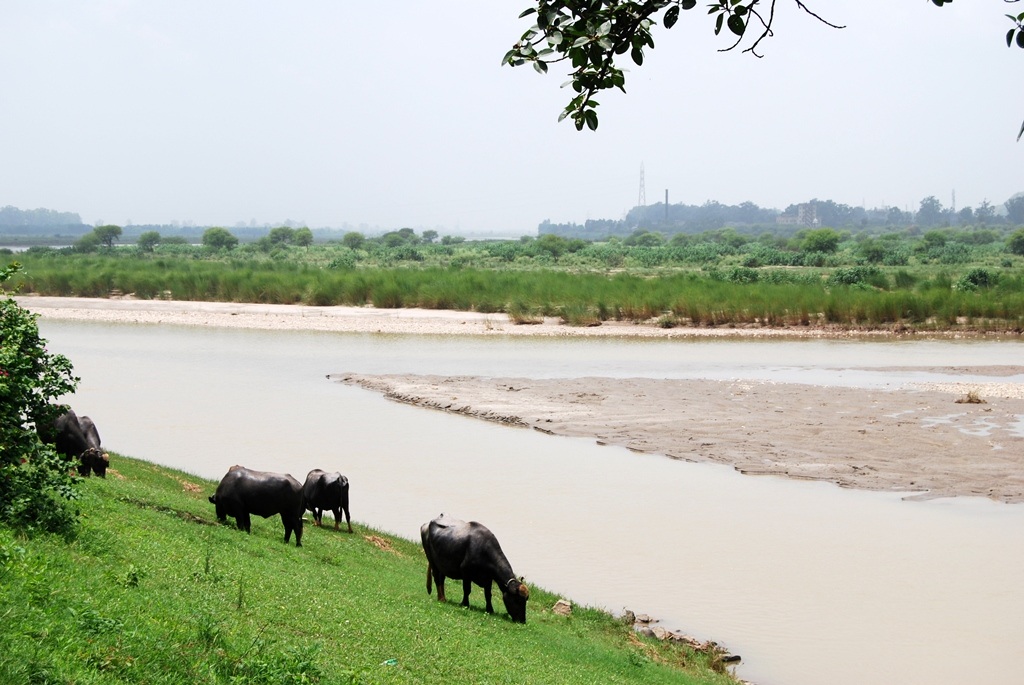
Satluj divides Doaba and Malwa

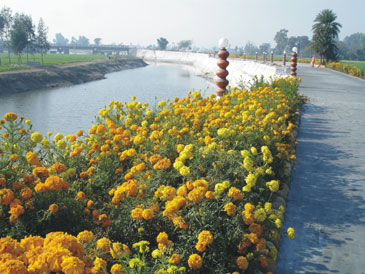
Black Bein

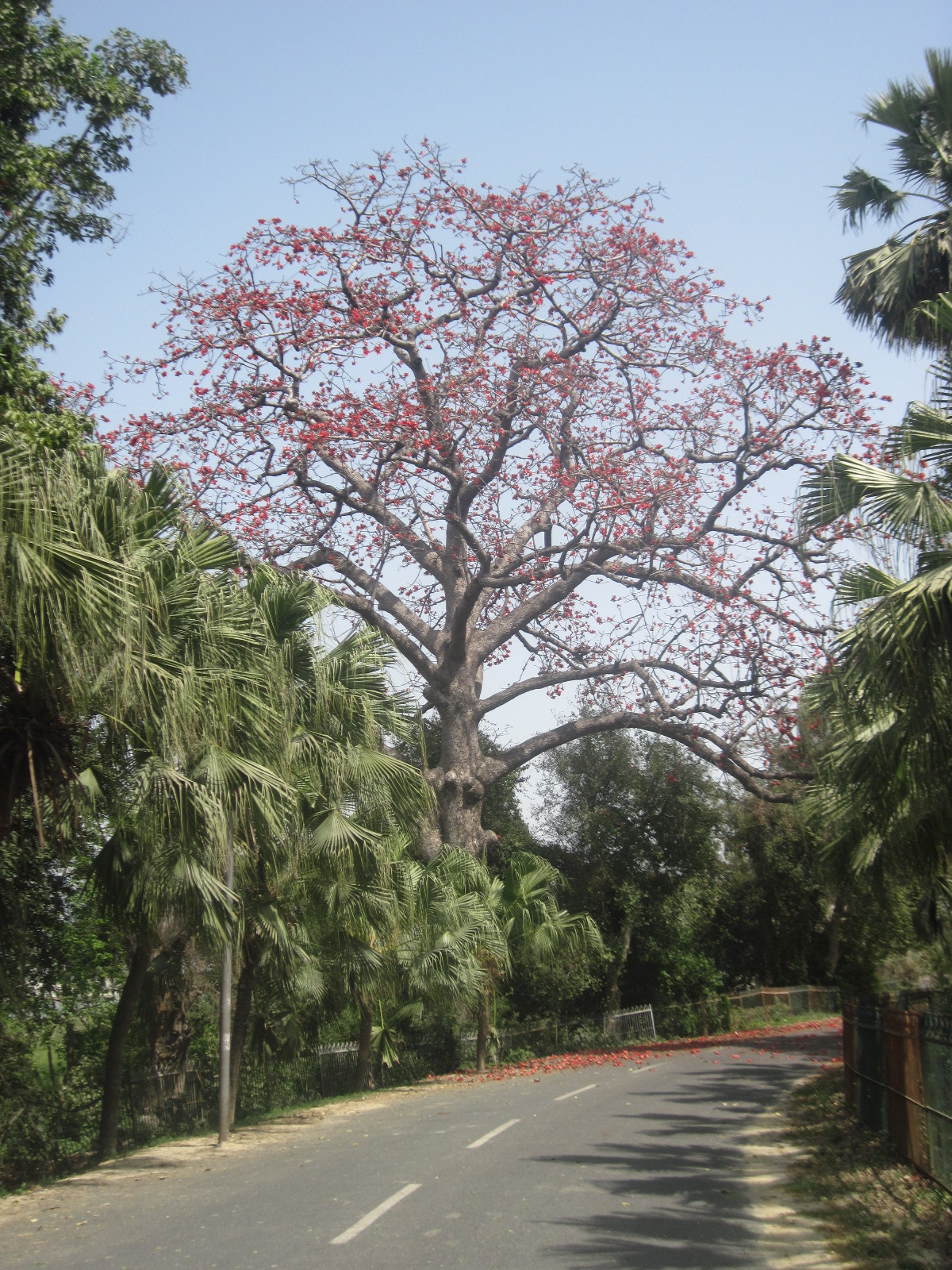
Butea

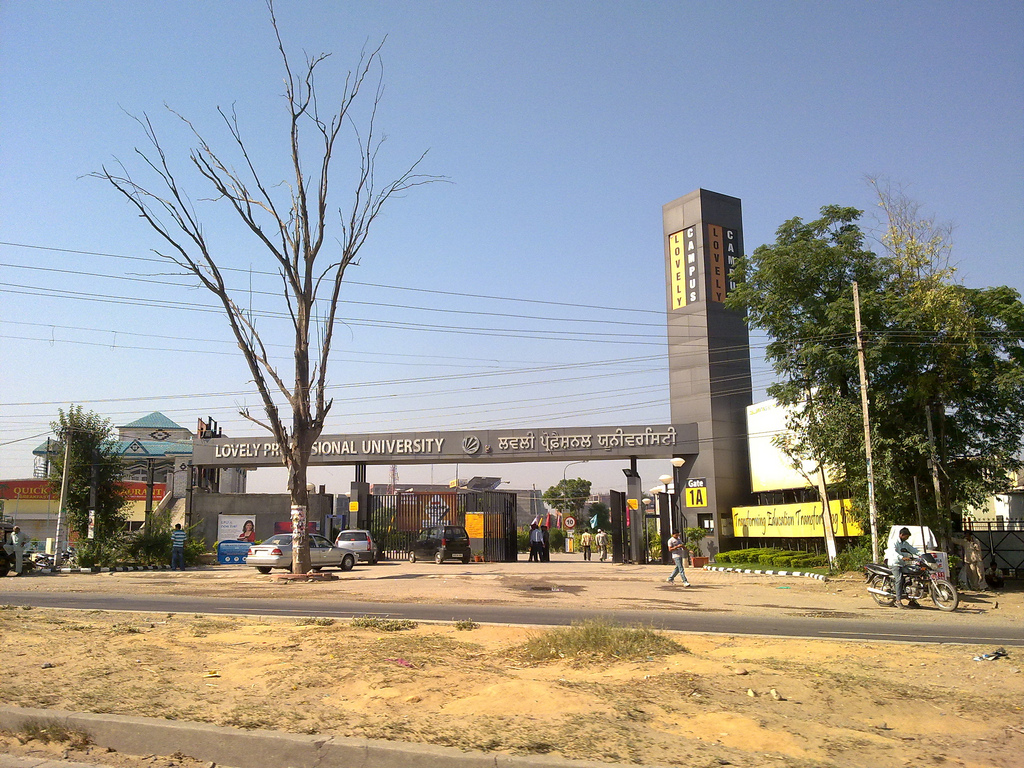
Lovely Professional University (LPU), Phagwara

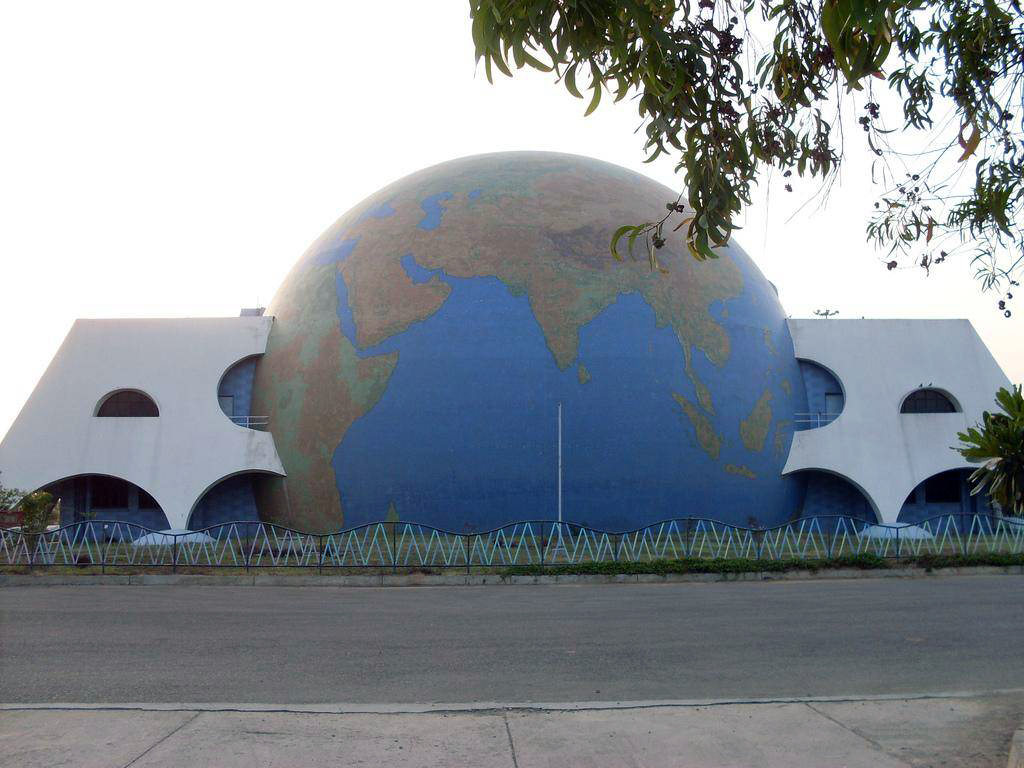
Pushpa Gujral Science City, Kapurthala

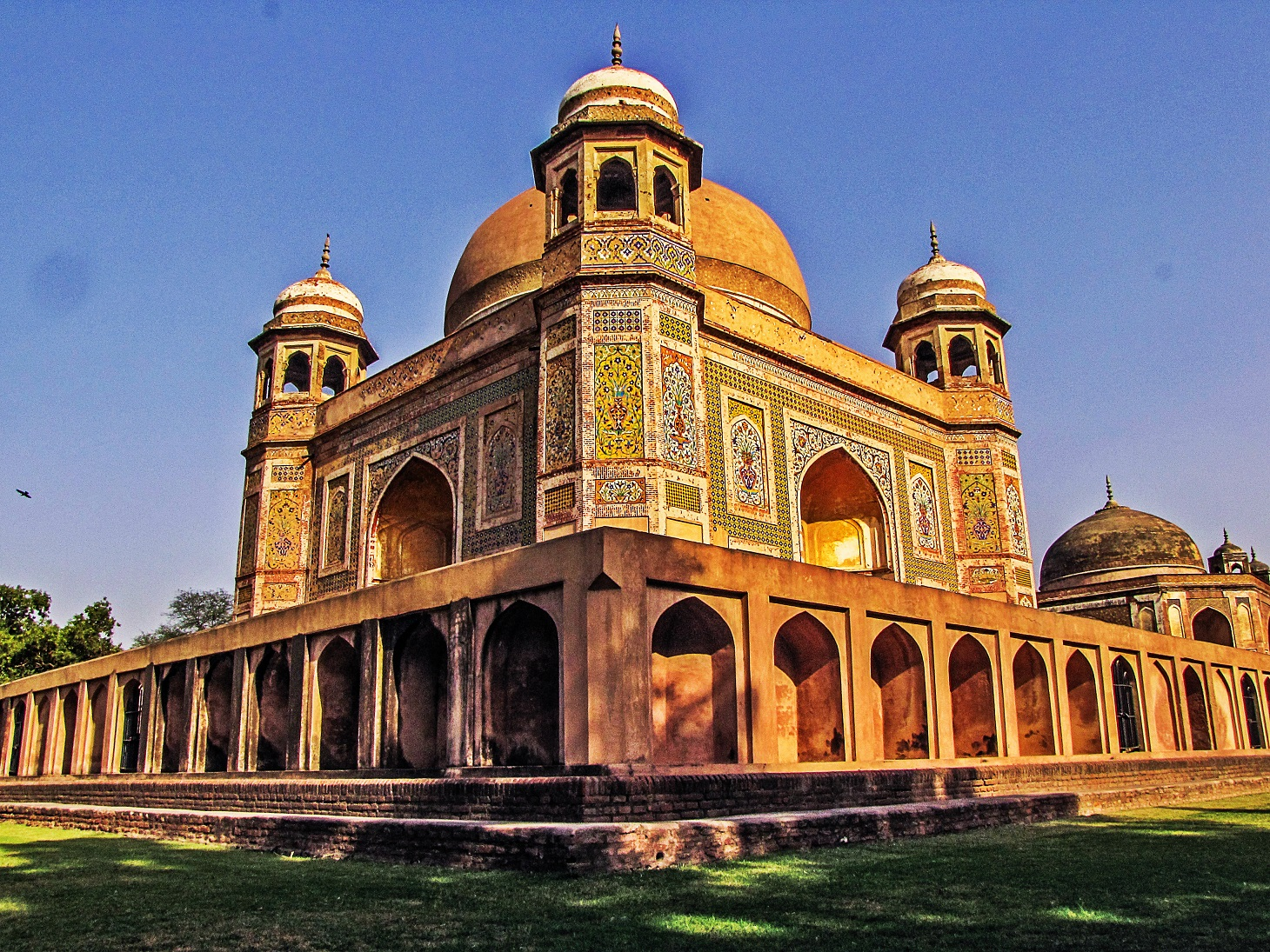
Ustad's Tomb, Nakodar

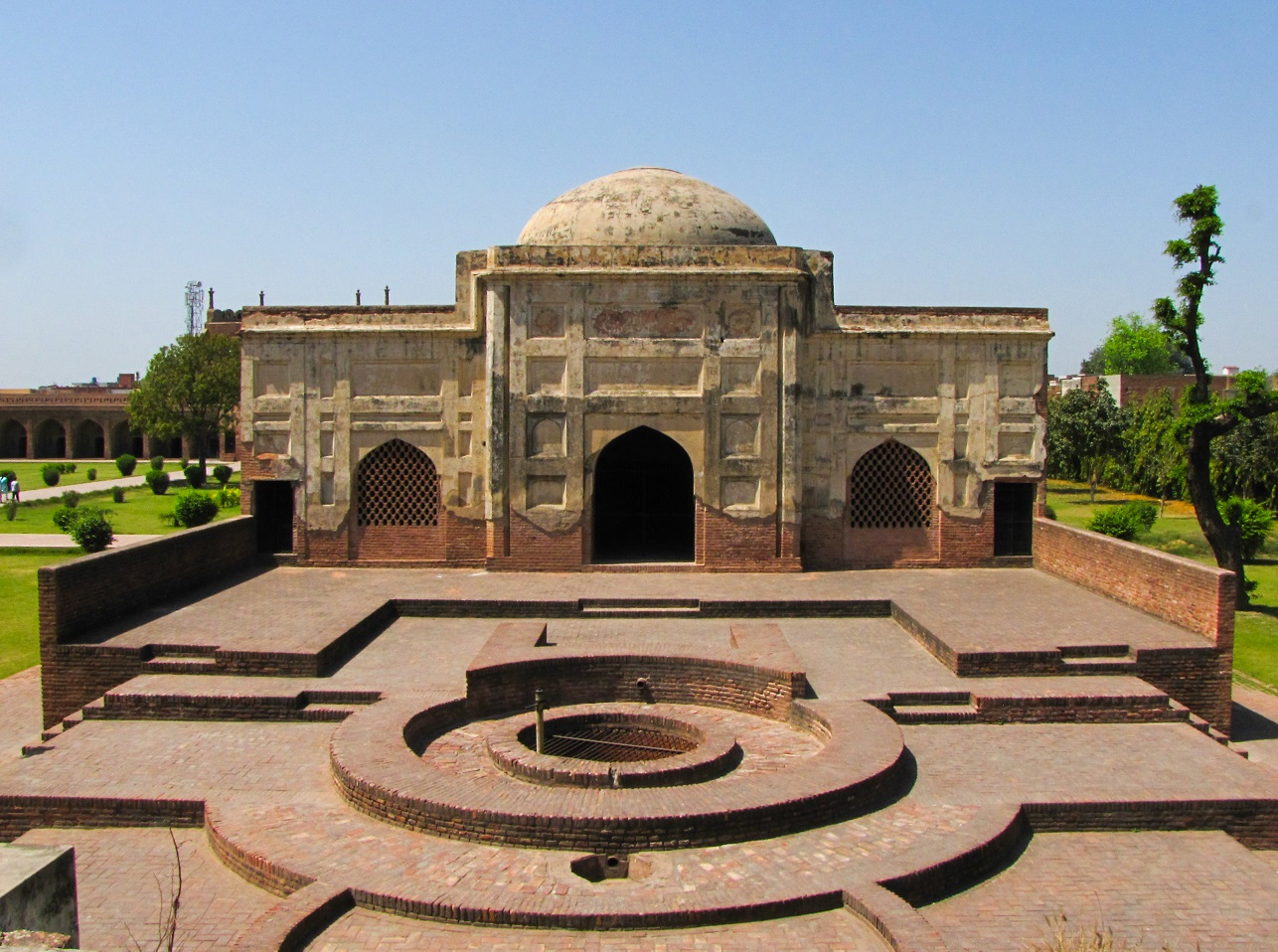
Mosque and Circular Well, Sarai Nurmahal

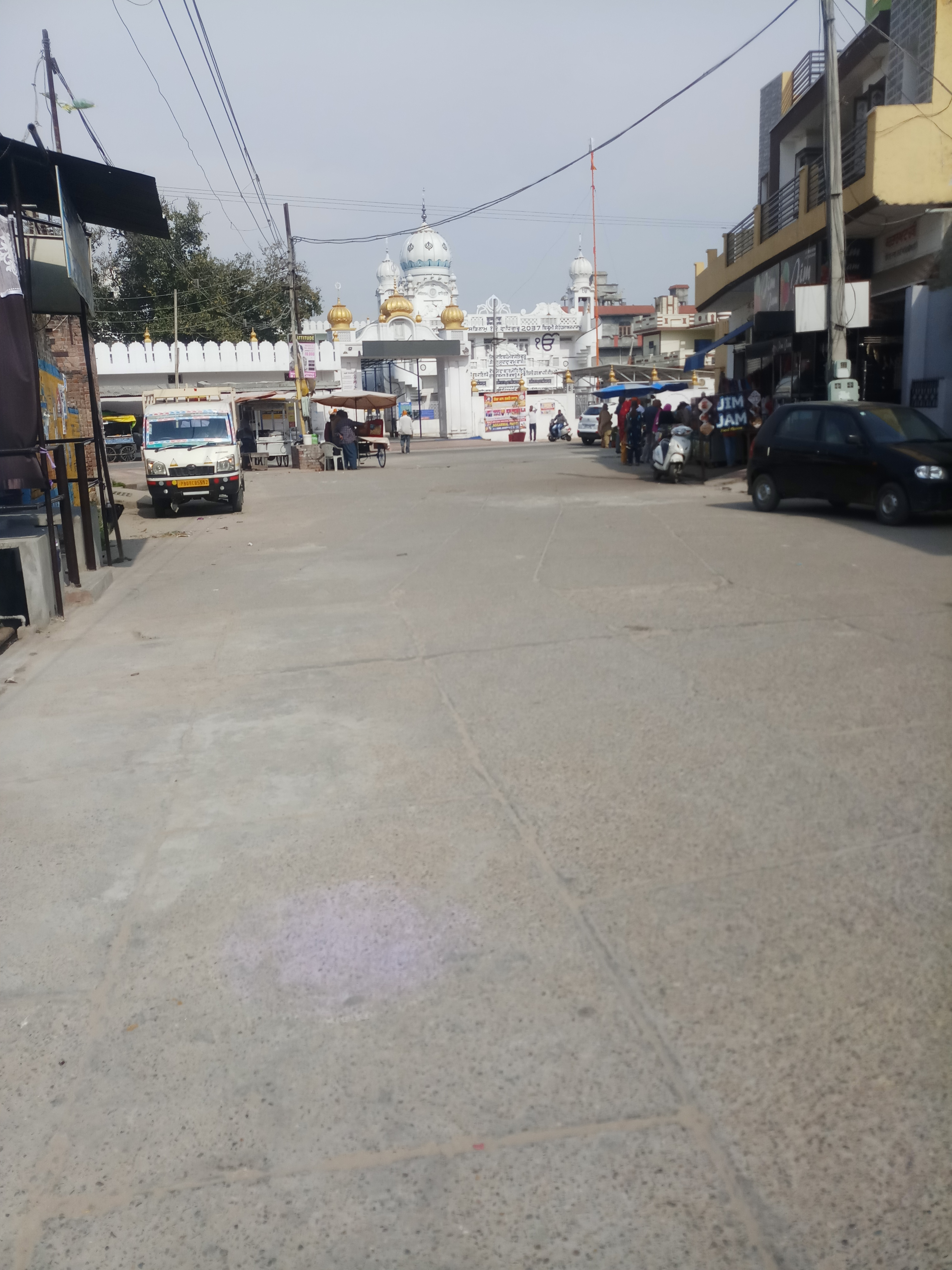
Gurudwara Baba Kahan Dass ji Kala Sanghian, P.S

== See also ==
- The Punjab Doabs
- Majha
- Malwa
- Poadh
