= Puadhi dialect =

Dialect of Punjabi

Puadhi
- Powadhi
- ਪੁਆਧੀ پوادھی पुआधी
- Pronunciation: Powadhi
- Native to: Punjab; Haryana; Chandigarh; Himachal Pradesh
- Region: Puadh
- Ethnicity: Punjabi (Puadhi)
- Language family: Indo-European: Indo-Iranian; Indo-Aryan; Northwestern; Punjabi; Eastern Punjabi; Puadhi
- Writing system: Gurmukhī Shahmukhī Devanagari

Language codes
- ISO 639-3: –
- Glottolog: powa1244

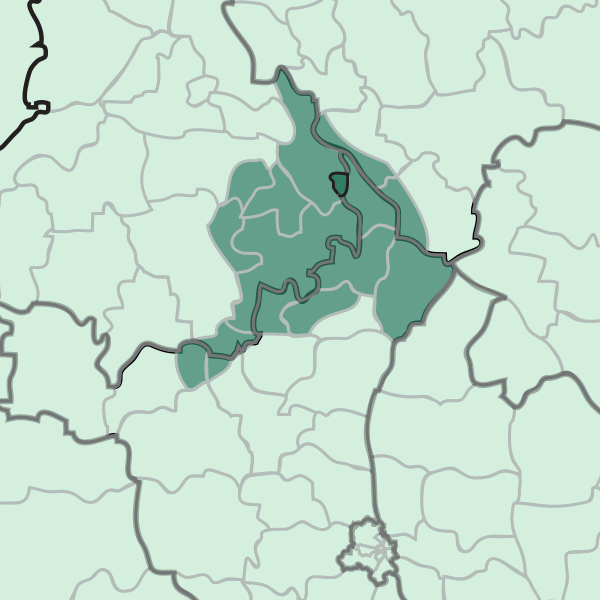
The Puadhi language is spoken across the region shown in green.

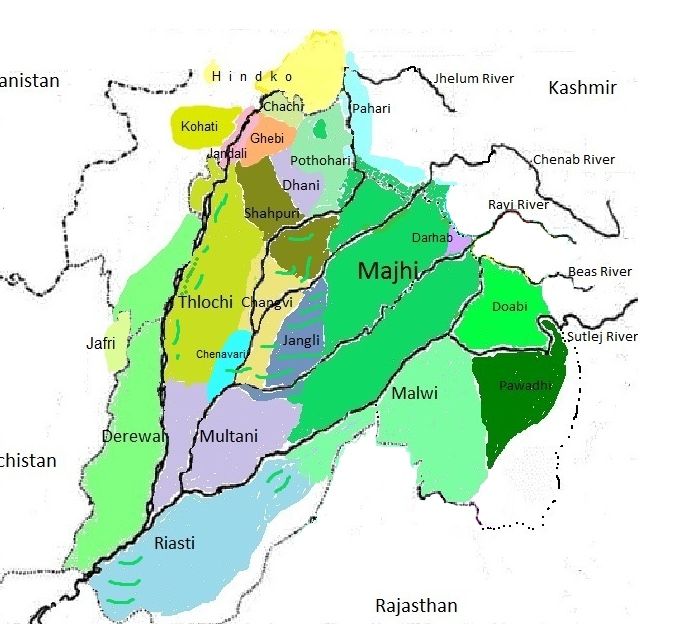
Map of Punjabi dialects and languages, including the Puadhi dialect in the southeast

Speaker of Puadhi dialect.

Puadhi (Gurmukhi: ਪੁਆਧੀ, Shahmukhi: پوادھی, Devanagari: पुआधी, Puādhī, sometimes spelled as Poadhi, Powadhi, Puwadhi, Pawadhi, or Pwadhi) is an eastern dialect of the Punjabi language primarily spoken in the Puadh region of northern India. It is spoken between the Sutlej and Ghaggar river basins in the present-day states of Punjab, Haryana, Himachal Pradesh and the union territory of Chandigarh.

Puadh extends from Rupnagar near Satluj up to the Ghaggar-Hakra river and its tributaries, Markanda and Som in the east, which lie in northern Haryana up to Kala Amb in Sirmaur district of Himachal Pradesh.

To the west it extends into the Puadh tract of Ludhiana district where the westernmost spoken varieties of the Puadhi dialect form a continuum with Malwai and in north it blend with Doabi. Puadhi's western boundary also extends into Fatehgarh Sahib and Patiala districts and its influence is observed in the southwest in the adjacent areas of Kaithal and Kurukshetra districts up to northern areas of Jind district such as Ujhana and Dhamtan Sahib.

The language is spoken over an area in present Indian Punjab, Himachal Pradesh. Chandigarh and Haryana. Puadhi spoken areas are: Kharar, Kurali, Mohali, Zirakpur,Dera Bassi, Lalru, Rupnagar, Morinda, Payal, Rajpura, Samrala, etc. in Punjab, in Chandigarh, and Ambala, Naraingarh, Panchkula, Raipur Rani, Pinjore, Kalka, Barwala, Shahabad Markanda, Barara, Thana Chappar, Pehowa, north of Kaithal and Tohana, etc. in Haryana.

== Grammar ==
- Genitive postposition: The genitive case particles of ਕਾ kā, ਕੀ kī, ਕੇ kē and ਕੀਆਂ kīā̃ are found in Puadhi, as compared to most other dialects which use ਦਾ dā, ਦੀ dī, ਦੇ dē and ਦੀਆਂ dīā̃. Puadhi shares this grammatical trait with neighbouring Bagri and Haryanvi languages. In Punjabi, this form of second case is also observed intermittently in villages that speak Malwai.
- Ablative postposition: ਤੇ tē is the Puadhi equivalent of Majhi ਤੋਂ tō̃, similarly ਗੇਲੇ gēlē is used instead of ਨਾਲ਼ੋਂ nāḷō̃.
- Topic marker: In addition to ਤੇ tē and ਤਾ tā, ਤੋ tō and ਤੌ tau are also commonly used. The latter ਤੌ is pronounced as a diphthong when emphasized. All four nominative particles are the same in Puadhi as in Haryanvi, which is spoken to its immediate south.

== Vocabulary ==
The Puadhi dialect has many words that differ from other dialects of Punjabi.

Puadhi folk song sung by Punjabi women

=== Examples ===
Puadhi	Majhi	Meaning
मैं / ਮੈਂ / میں	ਮੈਂ / میں	I
तू / ਤੂ / تو	ਤੂੰ / تُوں	you
हम / ਹਮ / ہم	ਸਾਨੂੰ / اسیں	we
वो / ਉੰਨੇ / وہ	ਉਹ / اوہ	he / she / they
मन्ने / ਮੰਨੇ / منّے	ਮੈਨੂੰ / مینوں	me / to me
तन्ने / ਤੰਨੇ / تنّے	ਤੈਨੂੰ / تینوں	you / to you
हम / ਹੰਮਨੇ / ہمّنے	ਸਾਨੂੰ / سانوں	us / to us
उन्ने / ਉੰਨੇ / اُنّے	ਉਹਨੂੰ / اُہنوں	him / her / them
म्हारा / ਮ੍ਹਾਰਾ / مہارا	ਮੇਰਾ / میرا	my
म्हारी / ਮ੍ਹਾਰੀ / مہاری	ਮੇਰੀ / میری	my (feminine)
म्हारे / ਮ੍ਹਾਰੇ / مہارے	ਮੇਰੇ / میرے	my (plural)
त्हारा / ਥਾਰਾ / تھارا	ਤੇਰਾ / تیرا	your
त्हारी / ਥਾਰੀ / تھاری	ਤੇਰੀ / تیری	your (feminine)
त्हारे / ਥਾਰੇ / تھارے	ਤੇਰੇ / تیرے	your (plural)
असांदा / ਅਸਾਂਦਾ / اساندا	ਸਾਡਾ / ساڈا	our
तुसांदा / ਤੁਸਾਂਦਾ / تساندا	ਤੁਹਾਡਾ / تُہاڈا	your (plural)
उन्दा / ਉੰਦਾ / اُندا	ਉਹਦਾ / اُہدا	his/her
की / ਕੀ / کی	ਕੀ / کی	what
कौन / ਕੌਣ / کون	ਕੌਣ / کون	who
कदों / ਕਦੋਂ / کدوں	ਕਦੋਂ / کدوں	when
कित्थे / ਕਿੱਥੇ / کتھے	ਕਿੱਥੇ / کتھے	where
क्यों / ਕਿਉਂ / کیوں	ਕਿਉਂ / کیوں	why
बेरा / ਬੇਰਾ / بیرا	ਪਤਾ / پتا	knowledge / know
जाण / ਜਾਣ / جان	ਜਾਣਨਾ / جاننا	to know
देख / ਦੇਖ / دیکھ	ਵੇਖ / ویکھ	to see
बोल / ਬੋਲ / بول	ਬੋਲ / بول	to speak
चाल / ਚਾਲ / چال	ਚੱਲ / چل	walk / go
आ / ਆ / آ	ਆ / آ	come
जा / ਜਾ / جا	ਜਾ / جا	go
खा / ਖਾ / کھا	ਖਾ / کھا	eat
पी / ਪੀ / پی	ਪੀ / پی	drink
बैठ / ਬੈਠ / بیٹھ	ਬੈਠ / بیٹھ	sit
उठ / ਉੱਠ / اُٹھ	ਉੱਠ / اُٹھ	get up
फेर / ਫੇਰ / پھیر	ਫੇਰ / پھیر	again / then
घणा / ਘਣਾ / گھنا	ਬਹੁਤ / بہت	very / a lot
जरा / ਜ਼ਰਾ / ذرا	ਜ਼ਰਾ / ذرا	a little / please
नहीं / ਨਹੀਂ / نہیں	ਨਹੀਂ / نہیں	no / not
किम्मे / ਕਿੰਮੇ / کِمّے	ਕੁਝ / کجھ	something / anything
नहीं / ਨਹੀਂ / نہیں	ਨਹੀਂ / نہیں	not / isn't
घर / ਘਰ / گھر	ਘਰ / گھر	house
पिंड / ਪਿੰਡ / پنڈ	ਪਿੰਡ / پنڈ	village
पाणी / ਪਾਣੀ / پانی	ਪਾਣੀ / پانی	water
रोटी / ਰੋਟੀ / روٹی	ਰੋਟੀ / روٹی	bread
दूध / ਦੂਧ / دودھ	ਦੁੱਧ / ددھ	milk
छोरी / ਛੋਰੀ / چھوری	ਕੁੜੀ / کڑی	girl
लुगाई / ਲੁਗਾਈ / لُگائی	ਔਰਤ / عورت	woman / wife
बच्चा / ਬੱਚਾ / بچہ	ਬੱਚਾ / بچہ	child
यार / ਯਾਰ / یار	ਯਾਰ / یار	friend
काम / ਕਾਮ / کام	ਕੰਮ / کم	work
बढ़िया / ਬਢ਼ੀਯਾ / بڑھیا	ਚੰਗਾ / چنگا	good
पैसा / ਪੈਸਾ / پیسہ	ਪੈਸਾ / پیسہ	money
अज्ज / ਅੱਜ / اج	ਅੱਜ / اج	today
कल्ह / ਕੱਲ੍ਹ / کل	ਕੱਲ੍ਹ / کل	yesterday / tomorrow
रोज / ਰੋਜ਼ / روز	ਰੋਜ਼ / روز	every day
उत्ते / ਉੱਤੇ / اُتے	ਉੱਤੇ / اُتے	above
हेठां / ਹੇਠਾਂ / ہیتھاں	ਹੇਠਾਂ / ہیتھاں	below
अंदर / ਅੰਦਰ / اندر	ਅੰਦਰ / اندر	inside
बाहर / ਬਾਹਰ / باہر	ਬਾਹਰ / باہر	outside
अग्गे / ਅੱਗੇ / اگے	ਅੱਗੇ / اگے	ahead
पीछे / ਪਿੱਛੇ / پچھے	ਪਿੱਛੇ / پچھے	behind
साँ / ਸਾਂ / ساں	ਹਾਂ / ہاں	am / are
सै / ਸੈ / سے	ਹੈ / ہے	is
तां / ਤਾਂ / تاں	ਤਾਂ / تاں	then / so
वी / ਵੀ / وی	ਵੀ / وی	also
अते / ਅਤੇ / اَتے	ਅਤੇ / اَتے	and
लई / ਲਈ / لئی	ਲਈ / لئی	for
तों / ਤੋਂ / توں	ਤੋਂ / توں	from / by / than
तक / ਤੱਕ / تک	ਤੱਕ / تک	until / up to

== See also ==
- Puadh
- Western Pahari
- Languages of India
- List of languages by number of native speakers in India
- Languages of Pakistan
- List of Punjabi television channels
