= Shahabad Markanda =

Tehsil in Haryana, India

- Town
- Location in Haryana, India Shahabad Markanda (India)
- Coordinates: 30.16°N 76.87°E
- Country: India
- State: Haryana
- District: Kurukshetra
- Named for: Rishi Markandeya

Government
  - Type: Democratic
  - Body: Municipal Committee

Area
  - Total: 8 km^{2} (3.1 sq mi)

Population (2011)
  - Total: 42,607
  - Density: 5,300/km^{2} (14,000/sq mi)

Languages
  - Official: Hindi
  - Regional: Puadhi
- Time zone: UTC+5:30 (IST)
- PIN: 136135
- Telephone code: 01744
- Vehicle registration: HR-78
- Website: haryana.gov.in

Shahabad Markanda is a sub-division of Kurukshetra district within the Indian state of Haryana. It is located on the left bank of the Markanda River, 20 km (12 mi) south of Ambala Cantonment and 22 km (14 mi) from the historical city of Kurukshetra. The town has a sub divisional court under the Kurukshetra Sessions Division along with the office of the administrative sub divisional magistrate who is the chief executive officer of the sub division.

== History ==
The town was founded after the Second Battle of Tarain (Taraori) in 1192 by the general Shahab-ud-din Muhammad Ghori. Historically, it was a majority Muslim town with references made to a fort during Delhi Sultanate times. This fort was pillaged by Babur following the First Battle of Panipat for having rendered assistance to Ibrahim Khan Lodi. It also has a historic mosque, a Sikh gurdwara, and many Hindu temples including Shri Markandeshwar Mahadev Shiv Mandir, Balasundri Mandir, Durga Mandir. After partition most of the Muslim inhabitants left, and Punjabi Sikhs and Hindus from Pakistan were resettled here.

After the victory over Rajput ruler Prithviraj Chauhan in the Second Battle of Tarain, the Ghurid ruler Muhammad Ghori donated 52,000 Bigha of land to his commander Qutb-ud-din Aibak. Mughal emperors Babur and Humayun also stayed here for some time.

In 1757, the town was captured and sacked by the Marathas. Following its destruction, the Sikhs started occupying territory, the Nishananvali Misl, under Dasaundha Singh and Sangat Singh, took possession of a long and narrow stretch of land south of the Sutlej, extending from Singhanvala in Moga, Punjab district up to Shahabad with Ambala as the headquarters. The territory of Shahabad Markanda and Ismailabad fell to Sardar Meharban Singh. Several attempts were made by the Afghans to dislodge the Sikhs, but they were repulsed every time.

It was during this period, between 1770 and 1780, that a magnificent old mosque, said to have been built by Mughal Emperor Shah Jahan in 1630, was converted into a Sikh gurdwara. The only major change was the demolition of its minarets. The gurdwara was named Mastgarh, this designation being commonly used for gurdwaras converted from mosques. Bhai Prem Singh of Hazur Sahib was appointed the first granthi. Gurdwara Mastgarh is on a high ground in the northeastern part of the town. The original prayer hall, under a high dome is used as the divan hall. The Sikh holy book Guru Granth Sahib is seated in the centre in front of the mihrab.

Shahabad was divided by the Sikhs into 7 patlis. The Sardars of Shahabad exercised administrative powers in the earlier days of the British regime but they were deprived of these powers by the British in 1850.

A market known as Kahan Chand Mandi was constructed in 1923 on the outskirts of the town but it did not flourish and now serves as a residential colony. A new market known as Partap Mandi was constructed in the 1960s.

Chief Minister of Haryana Bhupinder Singh Hooda announced Sub Divisional Status for Shahabad Markanda on 9 May 2011.

In 1710 famous Sikh warrior Banda Singh Bahadur captured Shahabad. Shahabad was then quickly recaptured by Mughal general Firuz Khan Mewati. Hundreds of Sikhs who were made prisoner were strung up by Firuz to the road-side trees, their long hair and beards being twisted to perform the office of a rope. On 22 May 1791 Baghel Singh and Karam Singh Nirmala of Nishanwalia Misl captured Shahabad by killing local Kiladar Khalil Khan along with 700 Mughal soldiers. The Sikhs also captured two cannons here. Commissioner of Karnal Major C. R. Buck in 1854 allotted shops to the traders. The market was named as Larkingunj. Presently it is known as Gurmandi.

Shahabad was famous for the manufacturing of scissors and musical instruments. The municipal committee of Shahabad was formed in 1885. The Railway Station and Railway Bridge were built in 1930.

== Geography ==
Shahabad lies 21 kilometres south of Ambala on the Ambala - Delhi section of the historical Grand Trunk Road, or GT road as it is locally known. It is some 22 kilometres to the north of Kurukshetra. Shahabad is on the national highway NH-1 and it also has a railway station on the Delhi - Ambala line. It lies on the banks of the River/stream Markanda, a tributary of the Ghaggar, and supposed to be a part of the ancient Vedic Saraswati River basin system. There is a large temple on the banks of the river, which is called Markandeya Mandir, after the name of the famous Maharishi Markandeya.

There is also a road from Panchkula, via Ramgarh and Dosarka, that comes out near Shahabad. There are direct roads to Ladwa and Radaur as well as Yamunanagar from Shahabad. Pipli, near Kurukshetra, Nilokheri and Karnal are the other nearby towns south of Shahabad on the Grand Trunk Road.

== Economy ==
It is a significant market for procurement of agricultural products. The market yard in Shahabad is a major procurement market or Mandi. The area being on a river bank is fertile and is used for paddy as well as wheat and vegetables. Poultry farming also heavily contributes to its economy. The yield is very high, and the belt till Karnal has a large number of rice mills to pick up the high quality grain. Shahabad also has a government sugar mill.

== Demographics ==
Religion in Shahabad Markanda Block (2011)
Religion	Percent
Sikhism	54.47%
Hinduism	43.07%
Islam	2.15%
Christianity	0.20%
Jainism	0.04%
Buddhism	0.02%
Not Stated	0.05%

The Shahabad city is divided into 17 wards for which elections are held every 5 years. The Shahabad Municipal Committee has population of 58,795 of which 28,913 are males while 26,694 are females as per report released by the 2011 Census of India.

Population of children between the ages of 0-6 is 4349 which is 10.21% of total population of Shahbad (MC). In Shahbad Municipal Committee, the female sex ratio is 860 against state average of 879. Moreover the child sex ratio in Shahbad is around 771 compared to Haryana state average of 834. The literacy rate of Shahbad city is 83.77% higher than the state average of 75.55%. In Shahbad, male literacy is around 87.11% while the female literacy rate is 89.93%.

Shahabad Municipal Committee has total administration over 9,222 houses to which it supplies basic amenities like water and sewerage. It is also authorize to build roads within Municipal Committee limits and impose taxes on properties coming under its jurisdiction.

Religion in Shahabad City
Religion	Population (1911)	Percentage (1911)	Population (1941)	Percentage (1941)
Islam	7,060	63.87%	10,096	68.47%
Hinduism (Note: 1941 census: Including Ad-Dharmis)	3,392	30.69%	4,000	27.13%
Sikhism	549	4.97%	643	4.36%
Christianity	19	0.17%	2	0.01%
Others (Note: Including Jainism, Buddhism, Zoroastrianism, Judaism, others, or not stated)	34	0.31%	4	0.03%
Total Population	11,054	100%	14,745	100%

== Education and scientific research ==
Notable schools include the Government School, established in 1897; Arya Putri Gurukul, established in 1909; and D.A.V. School, established in 1916. Islamiya School was converted as Khanewal Khalsa School. After partition some private schools were also established here, including Ramdutt Ka School, Prince Coaching College, popularly known as Sardaar Ka School (1950–2000), run by Principal Joginder Singh. National School of Guruji Master Teerath Singh Ka School played a notable role in the field of education here.

In higher education Markanda National College and Arya Kanya Mahavidyalya are important to note. Contributions of Lala Sita Ram Ji Rahees, Dr. Krishan Gopal Chadha, Lala Bhal Singh Gupta, Lala Kesho Ram were significant in spread of higher education for women and establishing Arya Kanya Mahavidyalya.

Divine Public School, Ram Parsad DAV Public School, Vishvas School, Satluj Senior Secondary School and Chanan Singh Ghumman Memorial College of Education run by Principal Dr. R.S. Ghumman, Sardar Kartar Singh Hayer School & College of Nursing run by Dr. Gurdip Singh Hayer in the memory of her mother Sardarni Joginder Kaur Hayer Memorial Education Trust are famous for providing quality education. Mata Rukmani Rai Arya Senior Secondary School, D.A.V Centenary School, and SGNP School are also famous in the area. There are two medical college "Adesh Medical College and Miri Piri Medical College.

== Sports ==
In the field of hockey, Shahabad was the home of many men’s hockey players, including International player Gurdeep Singh Bhullar {Superintendent Indian Customs Dept.} and Sanjeev Kumar Dang, former Olympian now serving in Punjab and Sind Bank. Other players include Dr Narinder Sharma (National Insurance), Baldev Singh Attari {Railways}, Jatinder Singh {Signals}, Dayanand Madan {Haryana Police}, Ganshyam Das {Signals}, Bhupinder Singh Bhindi {Punjab & Sind Bank} and Sandeep Singh. There are many other players presently settled abroad e.g. Sumandeep Singh (Rana), Prabhdeep Singh, though being settled out of the country contributed much towards the uplift of the country as well as promoting hockey.

Shahabad has produced a large number of women hockey players. The current National Women's Hockey Team has 12 players from Shahabad. From the last decade Shahabad has produced many women hockey players who have donned Haryana, Railways or Indian team colours. It has got the epithet of Sansarpur. These include former Indian woman players Bhupinder Kaur (Rail coach Factory) and Sandeep Kaur {Indian Railways}. She played for World Cup, Olympics & Asia Cup, too. She played as a captain of Indian Woman Hockey Team for seven consecutive years. Current national team representatives from Shahabad are: Suman Bala, Nutan, Meenakshi, Simarjeet Kaur, Balwinder Kaur, Kiran Bala, Gurpreet Kaur, Jasjeet Kaur, Rajni Bala, Rajwinder, Gagandeep Kaur and Surinder Kaur.

Beside hockey Shahabad also excels in other sports too: Narender Singh of Bibipur block, Shahbad, has climbed Mount Everest and created a new record by staying on the summit for an hour without oxygen. Narinder Singh created another three [sic] records: a) Cycle to recycle starting from Mt Everest base to Kanyakumari 11906 km in 63 days; b) Underwater Cycling 100 m in sea of Goa in 2012-13; c) he climbed Mt Elburs [sic] (i.e. the highest peak in Iran) in 2012; d) he cycled from Srinagar (J

== Martyrs ==
Sardar Shingara Singh Hanjra sacrificed his life for the country during the Indo-Pakistani Partition 1947. He also underwent imprisonments with Mahatma Gandhi helping him for the successful completion of his missions. Jagdish Kalra a youngster sacrificed his life for the country during the Indo-Pakistani War in 1965. A park is named after him and a statue of him is also installed there. "Patharan Walla Bazaar" of the town was also renamed as "Jagdish Bazaar". Khusdev Singh, Gurpreet Kaur and Gurdeep Singh of this town sacrificed their lives by fighting unarmed with the terrorists on 9 April 1988. The armed terrorists attacked the residence of then M.L.A. Dr. Harnam Singh. Five Shaurya Chakra were awarded by the President Of India to the brave family of Dr. Harnam Singh.

== Sights ==
The original Gurdwara Mastgarh was on a high ground in the northeastern part of the town. The original prayer hall under a high dome was used as the divan hall. The "Guru Granth Sahib" was seated in the centre in front of the mihrab. Bullet marks on the exterior surface of the domes and the walls document turbulence in the eighteenth century. However, a new Gurdwara has been constructed after demolition of the original Gurdwara. It is affiliated to the Shiromani Gurdwara Parbandhak Committee which administers it through a local committee.

== Notable people ==
- Sandeep Singh – hockey player
- Rani Rampal – hockey player
- Navneet Kaur (field hockey)- Hockey player
