= Kurukshetra district =

Coordinates: 29°58′12″N 76°51′00″E

- District of Haryana
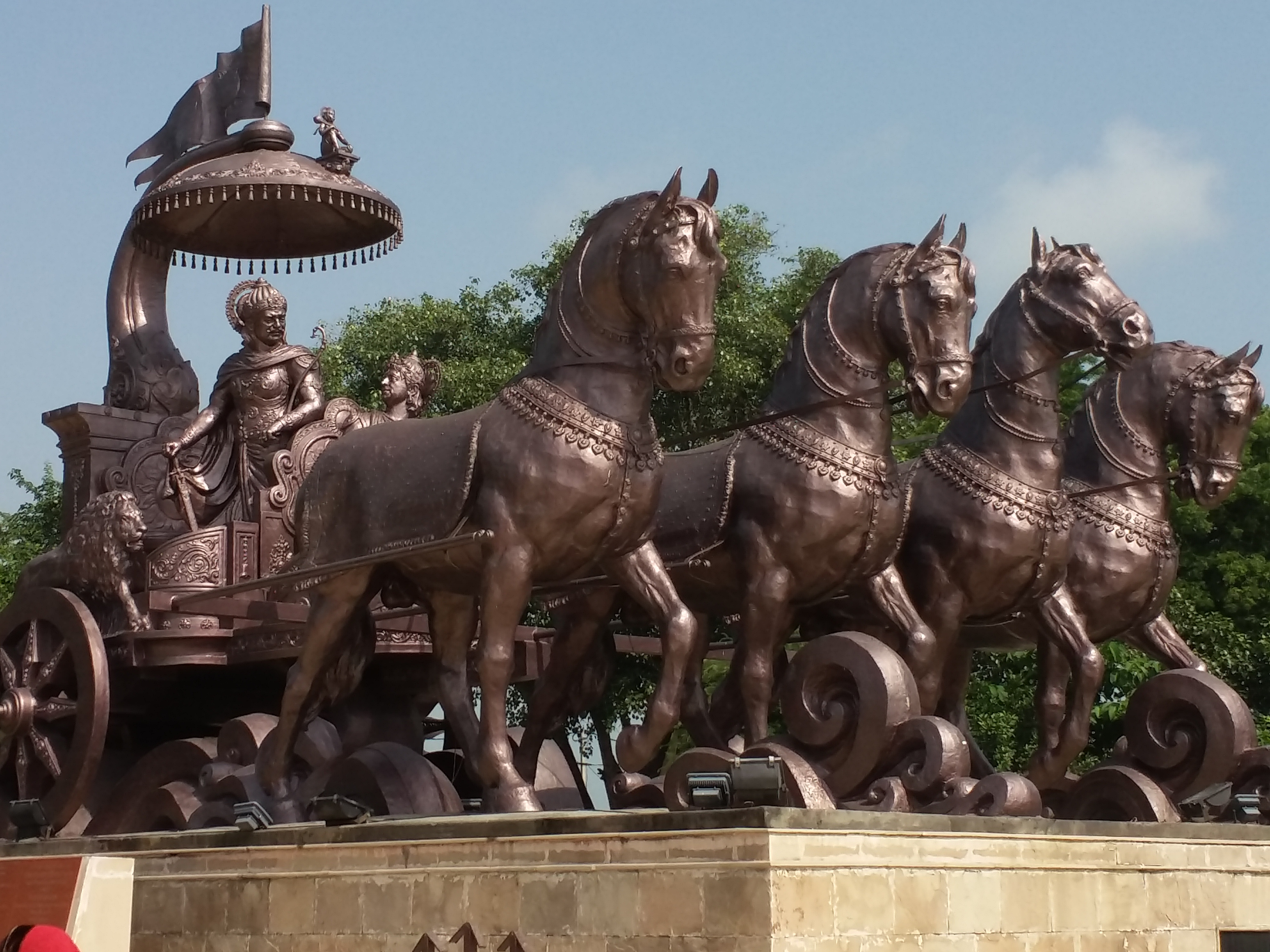
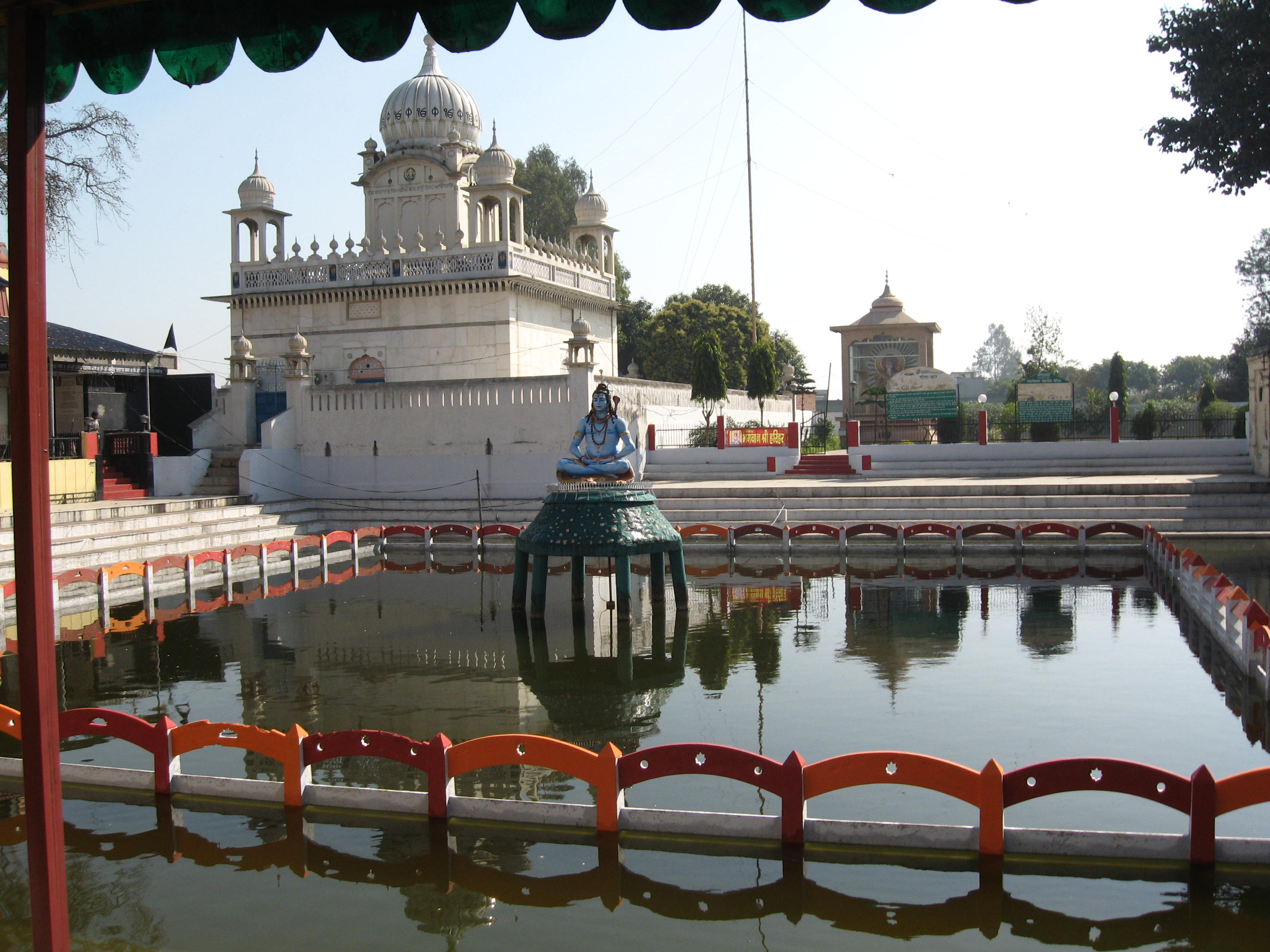
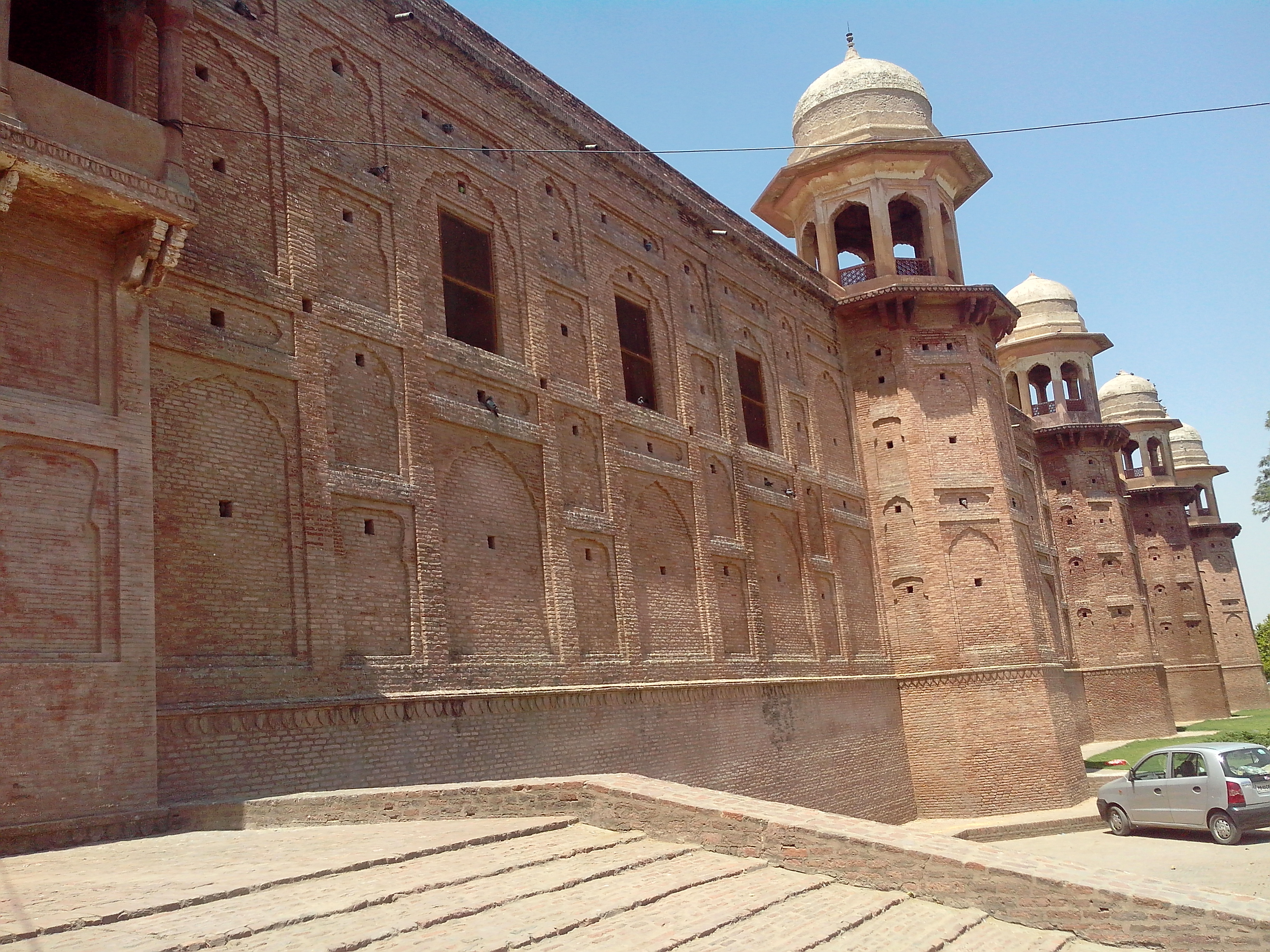
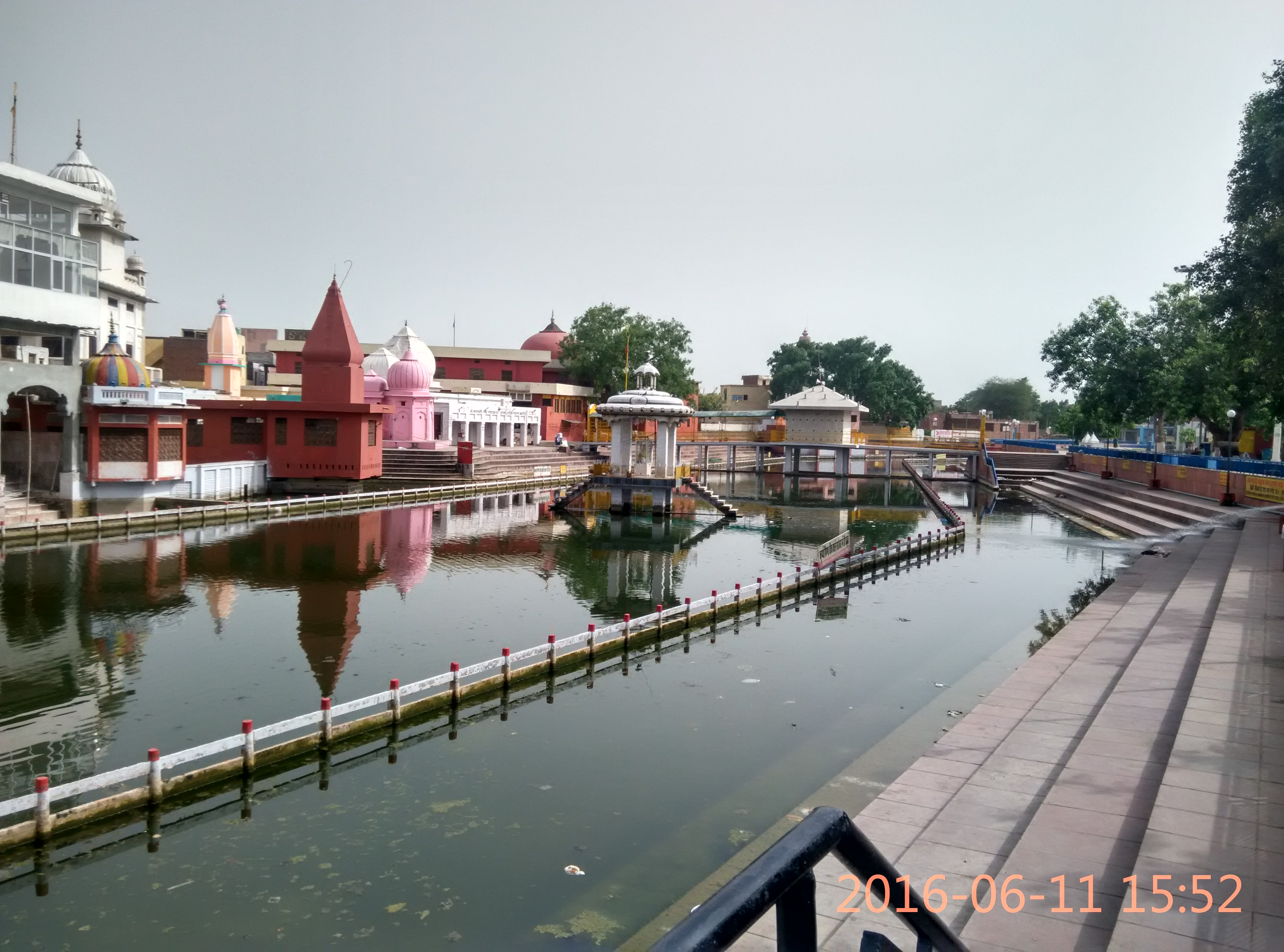
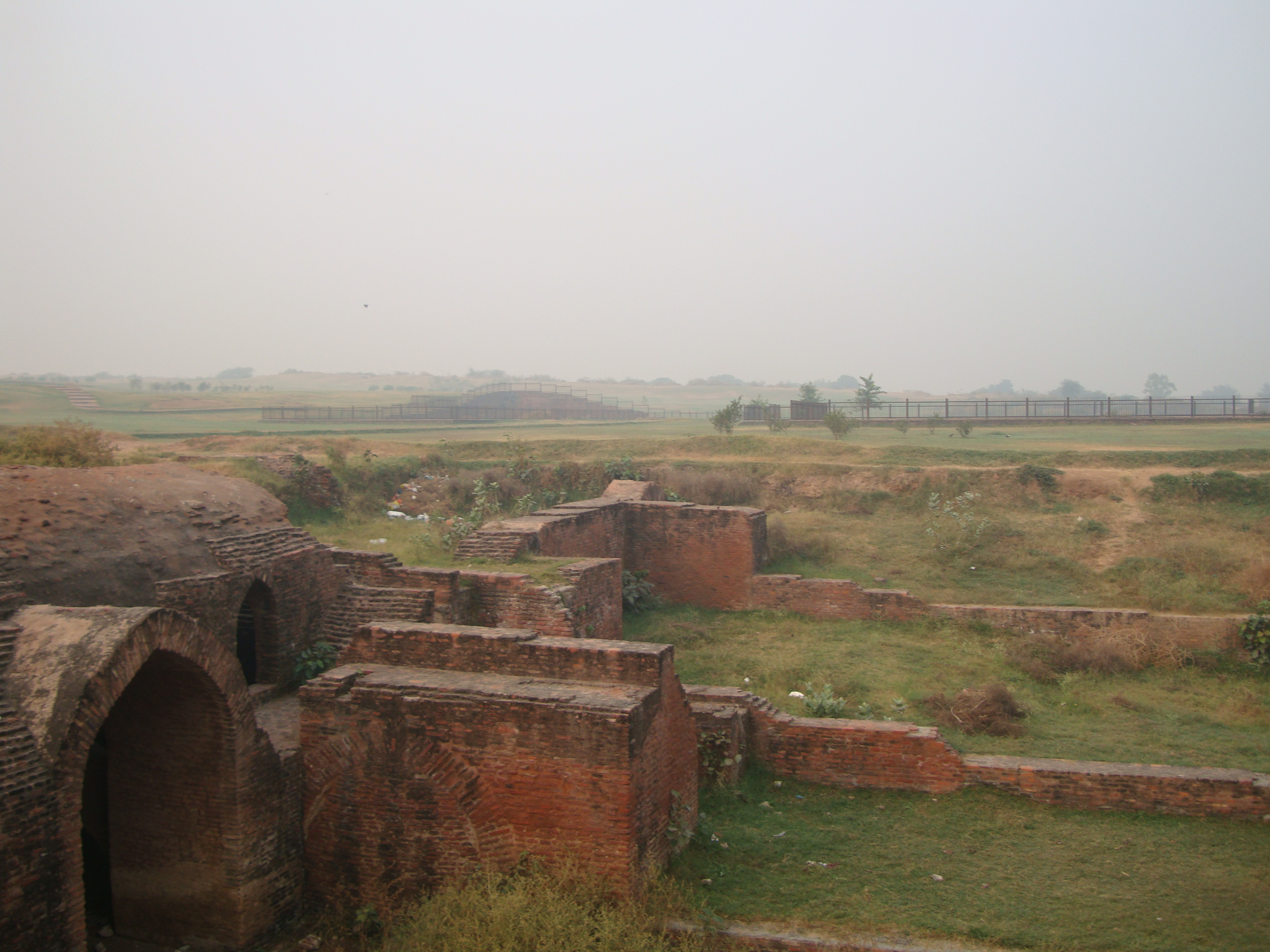
- Statue of Krishna and Arjuna in Kurukshetra, Sthaneshwar Mahadev Temple, Temple in Pehowa, Palace ruins, Sheikh Chilli's Tomb
- Interactive map of Kurukshetra district
- Country: India
- State: Haryana
- Headquarters: Kurukshetra
- Tehsils: 1. Thanesar, 2. Shahabad 3. Pehowa, 4.Ladwa

Area
  - Total: 1,530 km^{2} (590 sq mi)

Population (2011)
  - Total: 964,655
  - Density: 630/km^{2} (1,630/sq mi)
  - Urban: 26.10

Demographics
  - Literacy: 76.31
  - Sex ratio: 888

Languages
  - Official: Hindi
  - Regional: Haryanvi; Khadiboli; Puadhi
- Time zone: UTC+05:30 (IST)
- Lok Sabha constituencies: Kurukshetra (shared with Yamuna Nagar and Kaithal districts)
- Vidhan Sabha constituencies: 4
- Website: http://kurukshetra.gov.in/

Kurukshetra district is one of the 23 districts of Haryana state in northern India. The town of Kurukshetra, a sacred place for the Hindus, is the administrative headquarters of this district. The district occupies an area of 1530.00 km^{2}. The district has a population of 964,655 (2011 census). This district is part of Ambala division. Kurukshetra is also the land of Srimad Bhagawad Gita. Jyotisar is the place in Kurukshetra where Krishna is believed to deliver the sermon of Gita to Arjuna in the Mahabharata.

== Origin of name ==
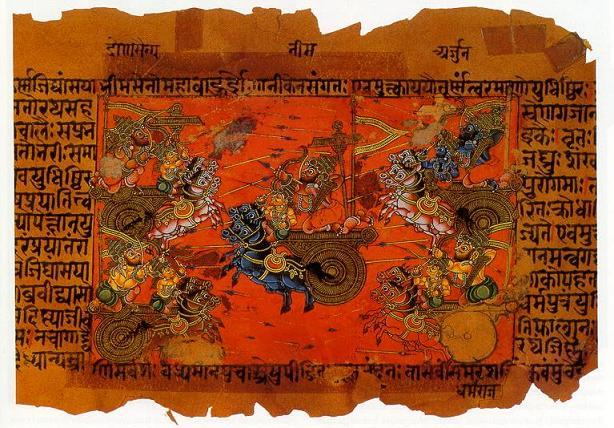
The Kurukshetra War depicted in a manuscript of the Mahabharata

The district derived its name from the ancient region of Kurukshetra, which literally means the land of the Kurus. It is believed that the Kurukshetra War described in the Puranas and the war was fought here and Shri Krishna preached the Bhagavat Gita to Arjuna on the battlefield before the war.

== History ==
The district was carved out of the erstwhile Karnal district in 1973. Later some parts of this district were transferred to Kaithal and Yamuna Nagar districts at the time of their creation.

== Sub-Divisions ==
The Kurukshetra district is headed by an IAS officer of the rank of Deputy Commissioner (DC) who is the chief executive officer of the district. The district is divided into 4 sub-divisions, each headed by a Sub-Divisional Magistrate (SDM): Shahabad, Thanesar, Ladwa and Pehowa.

=== Revenue tehsils ===
The district has 4 revenue tehsils, namely, Thanesar, Pehowa, Shahabad and Ladwa and 2 sub-tehsils - Babain and Ismailabad.

== Demographics ==
Historical population
Year	Pop.	±% p.a.
1901	175,735	—
1911	158,807	−1.01%
1921	164,560	+0.36%
1931	169,002	+0.27%
1941	197,157	+1.55%
1951	219,455	+1.08%
1961	341,906	+4.53%
1971	465,222	+3.13%
1981	542,423	+1.55%
1991	669,346	+2.12%
2001	825,454	+2.12%
2011	964,655	+1.57%

According to the 2011 census Kurukshetra district has a population of 964,655, roughly equal to the nation of Fiji or the US state of Montana. This gives it a ranking of 452nd in India (out of a total of 640). The district has a population density of 630 inhabitants per square kilometre (1,600/sq mi) . Its population growth rate over the decade 2001-2011 was 16.81%. Kurukshetra has a sex ratio of 889 females for every 1000 males, and a literacy rate of 76.7%. Scheduled Castes make up 22.30% of the population.

Religion in Kurukshetra district (2011)
Religion	Percent
Hinduism	83.47%
Sikhism	14.55%
Islam	1.66%
Other or not stated	0.32%

=== Languages ===
Languages of Kurukshetra district (2011)
1. Hindi (65.8%)
2. Punjabi (17.5%)
3. Haryanvi (15.2%)
4. Others (1.50%)

At the time of the 2011 Census of India, 65.81% of the population in the district spoke Hindi, 17.47% Punjabi and 15.22% Haryanvi as their first language.

== Education ==
Kurukshetra University was established as a unitary residential university at Kurukshetra in 1956. The Regional Engineering College at Kurukshetra was established in 1963, which was later renamed as National Institute of Technology. Kurukshetra has recently got two reputed institutions in the form of National Institute of Design and National Institute of Electronics & Information Technology (NIELIT). Apart from these, the Institute of Hotel Management at Jyotisar is also known.Also having country's first AYUSH University namely Shiri Krishna AYUSH University and now naturopathy is also made part of it. also new campus is awaited for the same.

== Transport ==
Kurukshetra Junction railway station is a junction station at the junction of Delhi–Kalka line and Kurukshetra–Jind branch line. It is located in the Indian state of Haryana. It serves Kurukshetra and Thanesar city.

== Ancient sites ==
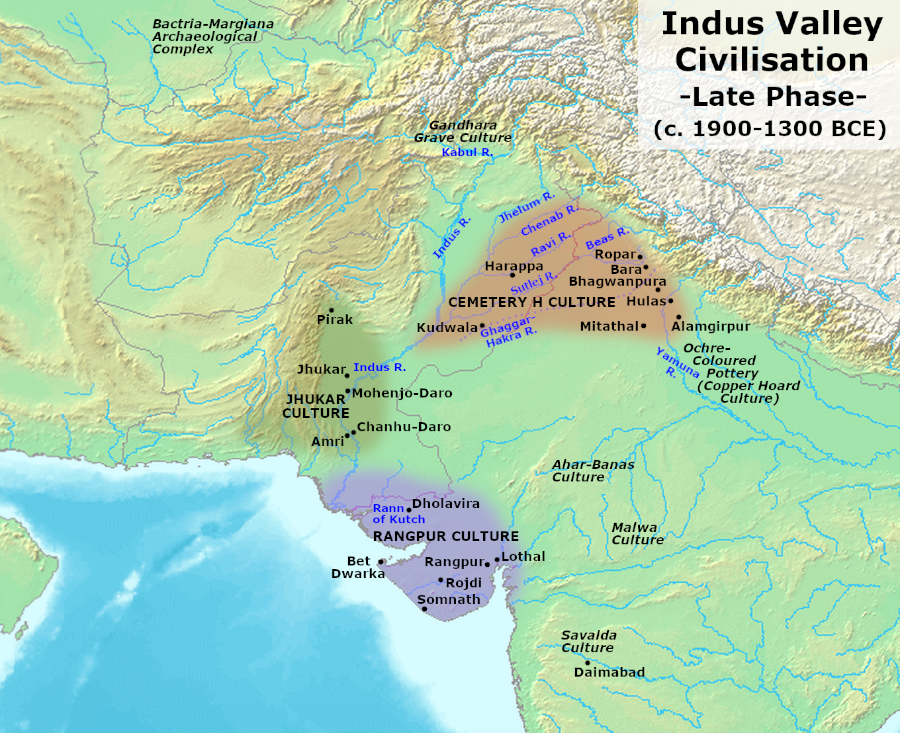
Indus-Saraswati Valley Civilization, Late Phase (1900-1300 BCE).

Karn ka Tila, also Raja Karn ka Tila, is a group of partially excavated archeological mounds 5 km southwest of Thanesar and immediately south of Kurukshetra University. There are several mounds, the smaller mound 200 m east of the main mound has the 4000 years old late phase (1900-1300 BCE) of the Indus-Saraswati Valley Civilisation with a 2-room complex of mud-brick walls.

Partial excavation of 10-meter high main mound found 3 archaeological cultural layers. The oldest Period-I Northern Black Polished Ware (NBPW) has pottery from the 4th century BCE. The 1st-3rd century CE Period-II has Plain Red Ware and Red Polished Ware pottery, 3 clay seals in Brahmi script & terracotta figurines. Habitation at the site was abandoned after period-II, and resettled in the medieval times in the Period-III which has [[lakhori bricks]] and pre-Mughal Empire glazed ware, ruins of late medieval fortification, hauz of lakhauri bricks plastered with lime.

Bhai Lakhi Shah Banjara Baoli at Ishargarh, 7 km north of Pipli bus stand on NH-44 Grand Trunk Road, was constructed by Bhai Lakhi Rai Banjara. See also Stepwells of Haryana.

== Gita Mahotsav ==
Kurukshetra, also known as the land of Mahabharta, is known for the Philosophy of Life and Karma given to Arjuna by Lord Krishna. For more than 2000 years now, Srimad Bhagawad Gita has emerged as the single scripture which is free from the tags of religions and communities. It is revered globally for the message of Selfless Karma.

Kurukshetra has been celebrating Gita Mahotsav (Gita Jayanti). For long it was known as Kurukshetra Utsav. In 2016, the Haryana Government decided to give it a global fervor and organised annual International Gita Mahotsav at Kurukshetra from 1 December to 11 December. The Gita Jayanti was celebrated on 10 December as per the traditional calendar. In 2016, over 1 million people visited the events.

== See also ==
- 48 kos parikrama
- Administrative divisions of Haryana
