= Jherian Wali =

- Village
- Location in Punjab, India Jherian Wali (India)
- Coordinates: 29.871°N 75.258°E
- Country: India
- State: Punjab
- District: Mansa
- Talukas: Sardulgarh

Languages
  - Official: Punjabi
  - Regional: Punjabi
- Time zone: UTC+5:30 (IST)

Jherian Wali (also known as Jherianwali and Bishanpura) is a village in Sardulgarh tehsil of Mansa district in Punjab, India.

== Geography ==
Jherian Wali is centered approximately at 29°52′16″N 75°15′29″E. Beere Wala Jattan, Baje Wala, Chhapian Wali, Nangla, Burj Bhalaike, Mian, Raipur and Tandian are the surrounding villages.

== History ==
The name Jherian Wali is driven a pond in the area. The other name of the village, Bishanpura, is after Bishan Singh, an ancestor of the village.

== Culture ==
Punjabi is the mother tongue as well as the official language of the village.

=== Religion ===
The village is predominated by Sikhs, the followers of Sikhism with other minorities. The Sikhs worships in the Gurudwara and Hindus have a Balmik Mandir.

== Education and economy ==
=== Education ===
The village has a government middle school which upgraded to high in 2010 and a new building was built. To provide children pure drinking water, the school has a Reverse osmosis plant.

=== Economy ===
Agriculture is the main source of income for all Jat people of the village while the poor do labour.
