= Mian, Punjab =

Mian Karam Singh Wala Mian
- village
- Location in Punjab, India Mian (India)
- Coordinates: 29°51′16.03″N 75°14′17.04″E
- Country: India
- State: Punjab
- District: Mansa
- Talukas: Sardulgarh

Languages
  - Official: Punjabi
  - Regional: Punjabi
- Time zone: UTC+5:30 (IST)

Mian, also known as Karam Singh Wala Mian, is a village in Sardulgarh tehsil of Mansa district in Punjab, India.

== Geography ==
Jherian Wali, Ullak, Burj Bhalaike, Jaurkian and Tandian are the surrounding villages.

== Education and economy ==
Education

{The village has a government CBSE high school 6th to 12th}

The village has a government primary school.

Economy

Agriculture is the main source of income.
