= Raipur, Mansa =

Raipur
- Village
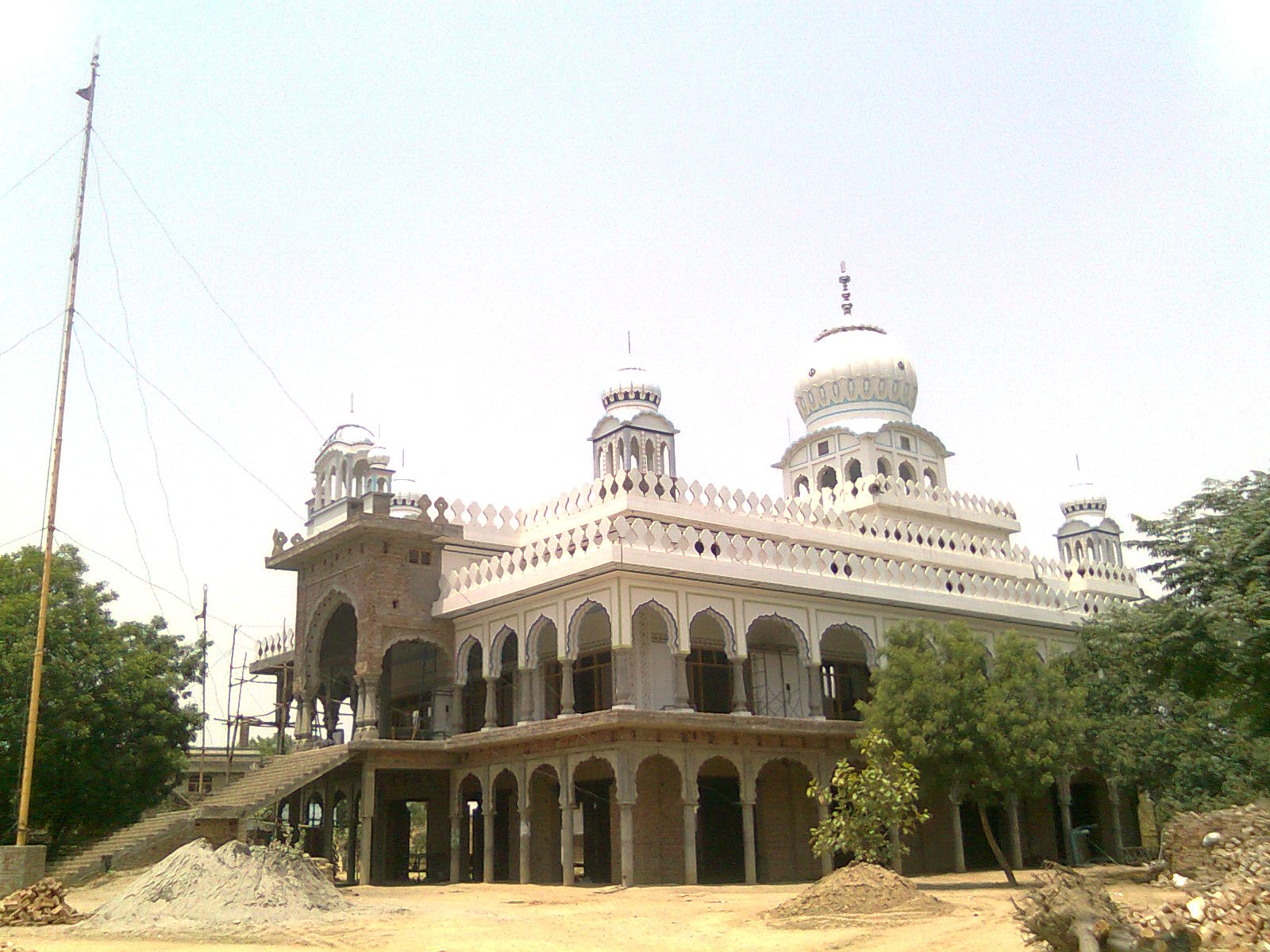
- New building of the Gurudwara Sahib
- Interactive map of Raipur
- Coordinates: 29.9055°N 75.2547°E
- Country: India
- State: Punjab
- District: Mansa
- Talukas: Sardulgarh
- Elevation: 212 m (696 ft)

Population (2011)
  - Total: 5,883

Languages
  - Official: Punjabi (Gurmukhi)
  - Regional: Punjabi
- Time zone: UTC+5:30 (IST)
- PIN: 151505
- Telephone code: 01659-268***
- Nearest city: Mansa
- Sex ratio: 1000/868 ♂/♀
- Avg. summer temperature: 43 °C (109 °F)
- Avg. winter temperature: 06 °C (43 °F)

Raipur, located in the Sardulgarh tehsil of Mansa district in Punjab, India, is an old and noted village of the area.

== Geography ==
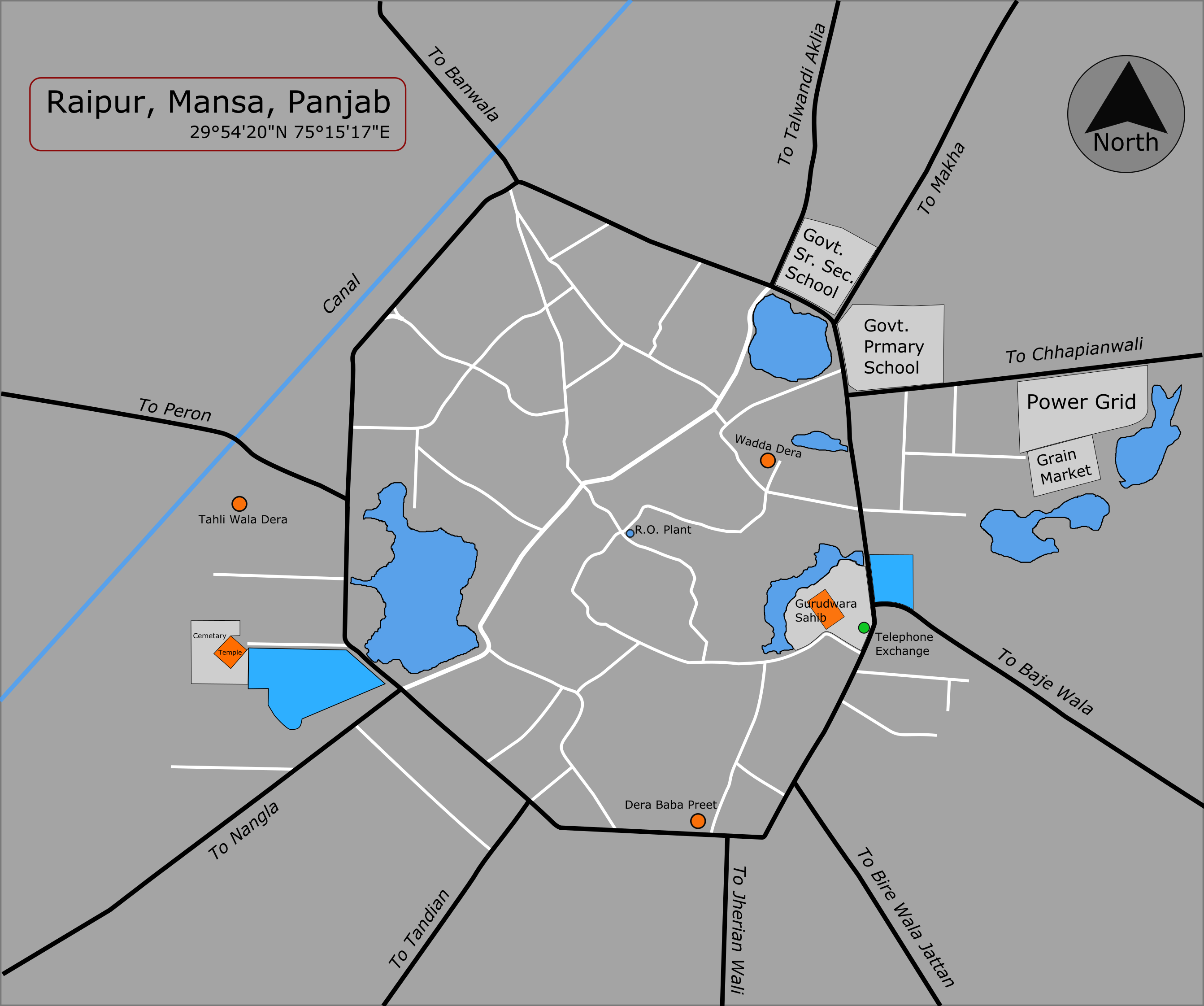
Map of the village

Raipur, having an average elevation of 212 metres (696 ft), is approximately centered at 29°54′20″N 75°15′17″E. It is located in the development block of Jhunir in Mansa district of Indian Punjab. The city of Mansa lies to its northeast (21 km), the city and district of Bathinda to its northwest, Sardulgarh to its south (32 km) and the state capital city of Chandigarh to its far northeast (203 km). The historical city of Talwandi Sabo is just 21 km away in the northwest. It is linked directly to the 11 surrounding villages, Baje Wala, Bire Wala Jattan, Jherian Wali (Bishanpura), Tandian, Nangla, Peron, Behniwal, Bana Wala, Talwandi Aklia (Chhoti Talwandi), Makha and Chhapian Wali.

== Demographics ==
As of the 2011 census, the village had a population of 5,883 with 1173 households, 3,149 males and 2,734 females. Thus, males constitute 53.5% and females 46.5% of the total population with a sex ratio of 868 females per thousand males.

== Culture ==
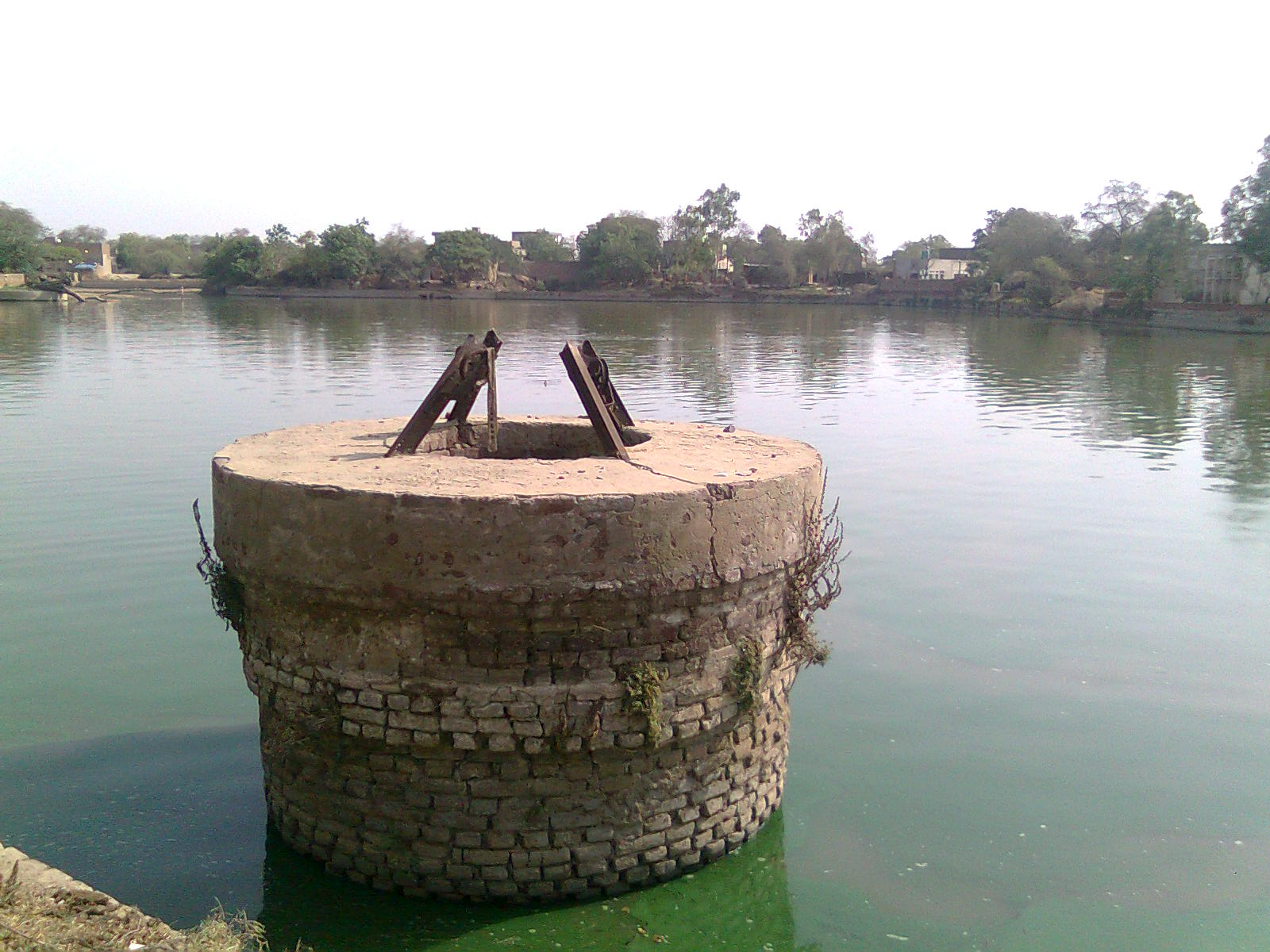
Old drinking water well

Punjabi is the mother tongue as well as the official language of the village, predominated by the Jatt people of Sidhu clan. There is an old well which was used in the past for drinking water but it has long been unused and is near-ruined.

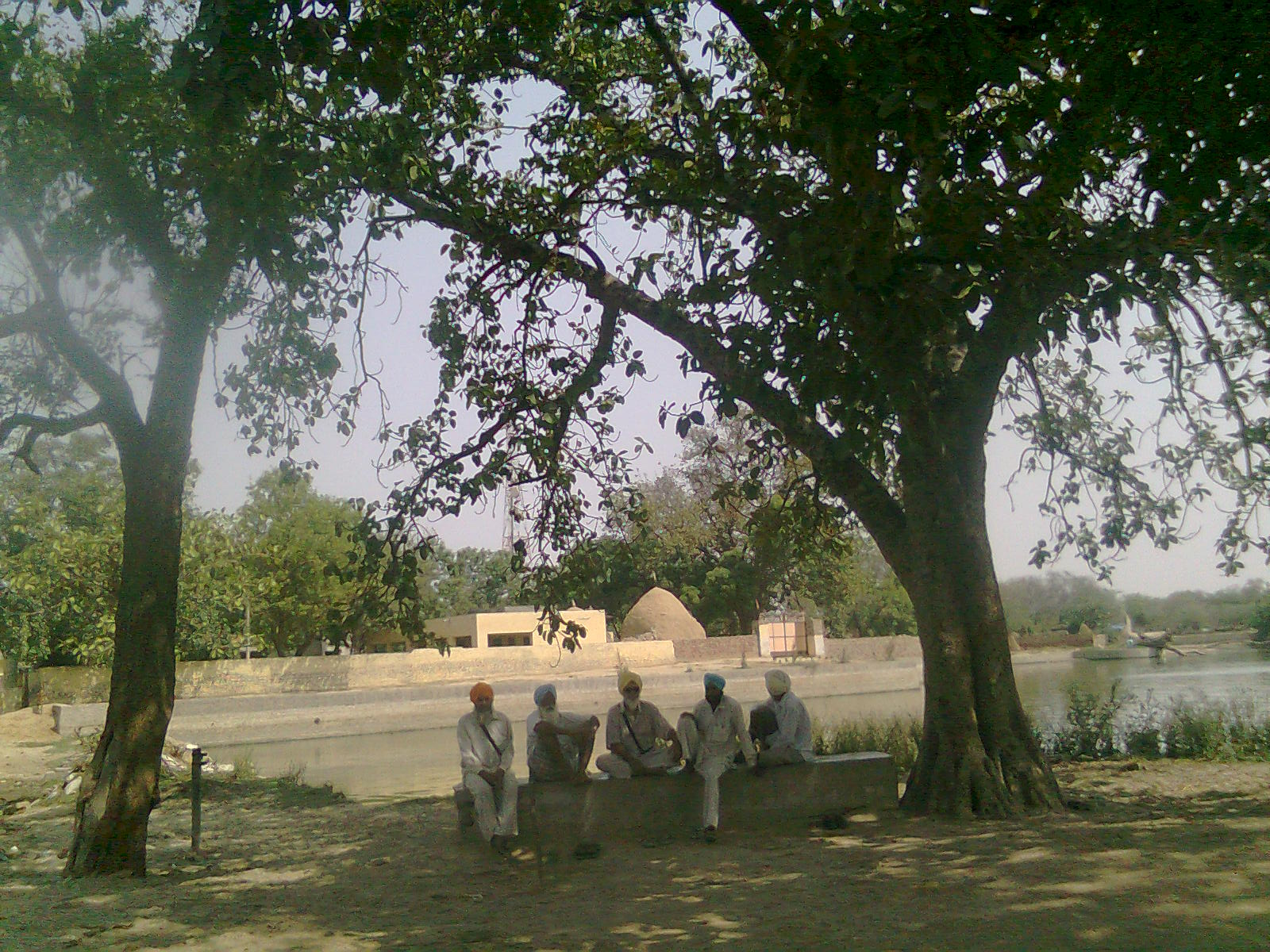
Local men sitting under a Pippal tree

Men used to pass their free time by sitting together in the satth (English: a common place) or playing cards.

=== Religion ===
The village is predominantly Sikh, with Hindu and Muslim minorities.

The Gurudwara Sahib is the main religious site for all. There are three Deras, following the Sikh faith, in the memory of/founded by the respected Sants, known as Wadda Dera, Tahli Wala Dera and Dera Baba Preet. The village, further, has a lali Mandir now known as Durga Mandir, located near the water works as the worship site for Hindus. There is a burial place for the Muslim families.

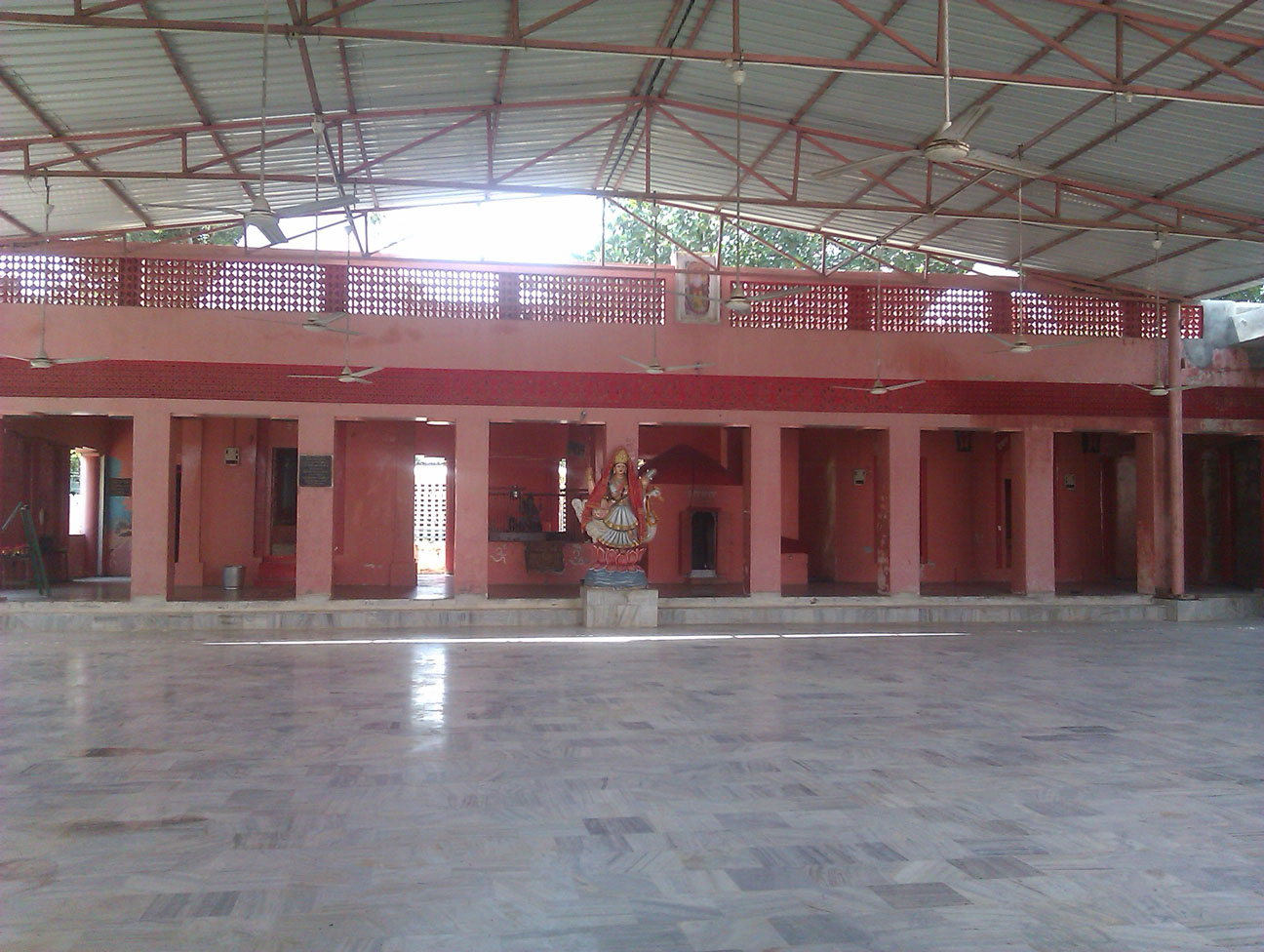
Lali Mandir Known as Durga Mandir

== Climate ==
The western Himalayas in the north, Thar Desert in the southwest and monsoons mainly determine the climate. The temperature can reach 43 °C (109 °F) in summer and 5 °C (41 °F) in winter. Monsoons greatly affect the agriculture in the region as nearly 70% of the rain falls between July and September.

== Education ==
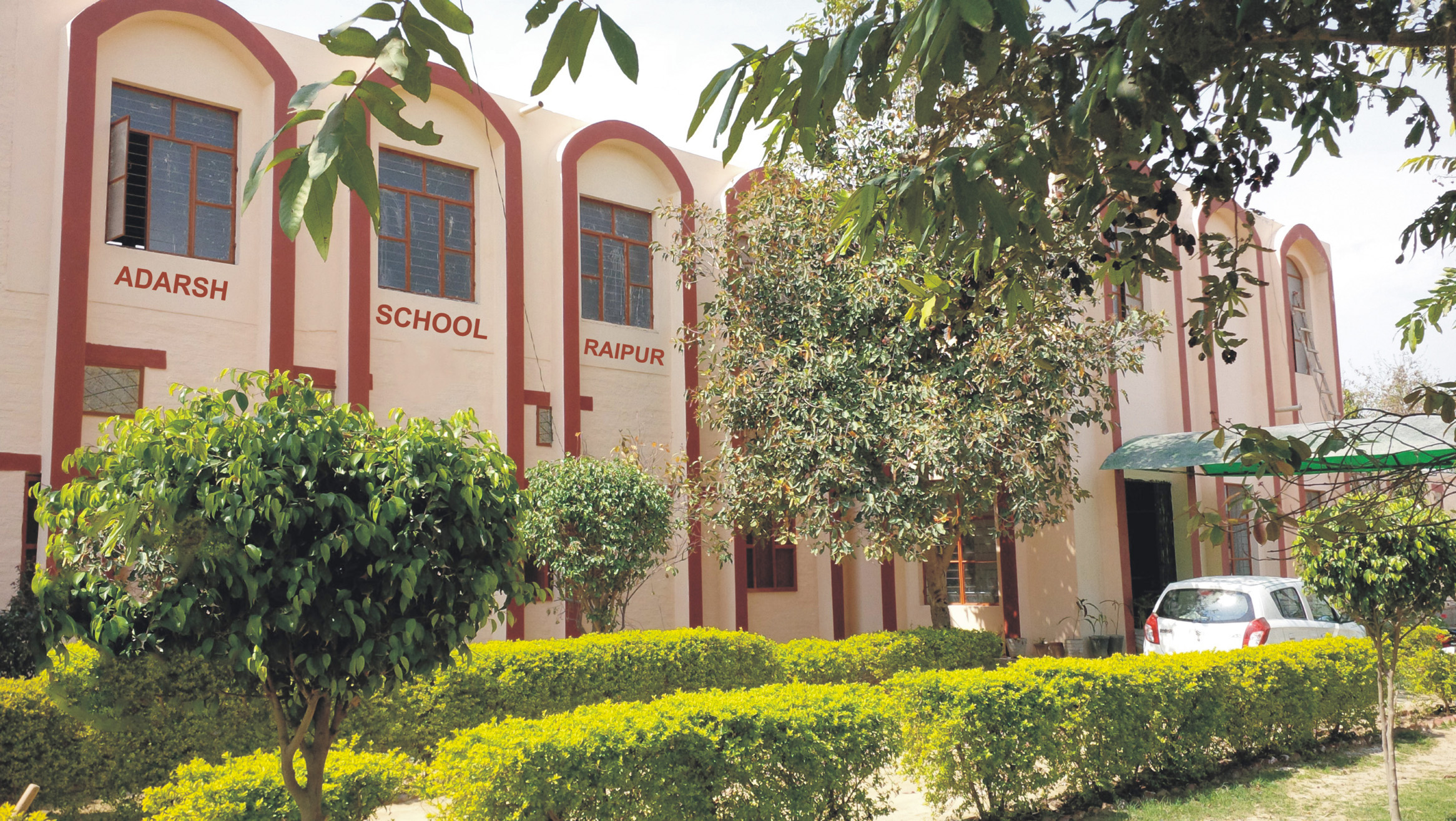
Adarsh Public Sr. Sec. School, Raipur

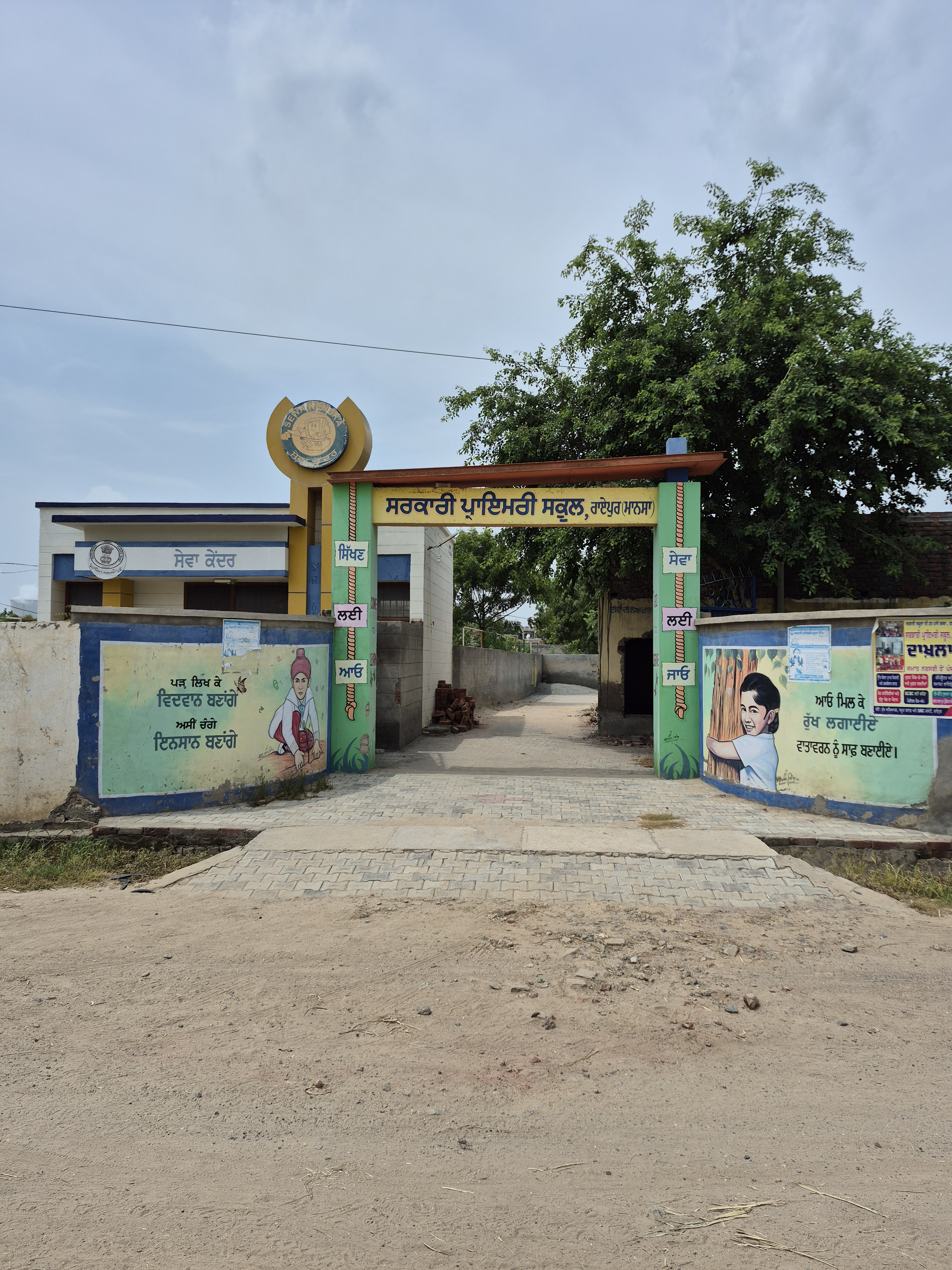
Government Primary School

The village has good educational options, having a pioneer Institution of Secondary education Adarsh Public Senior Secondary School, government primary school, and a government senior secondary school.

== Economy ==
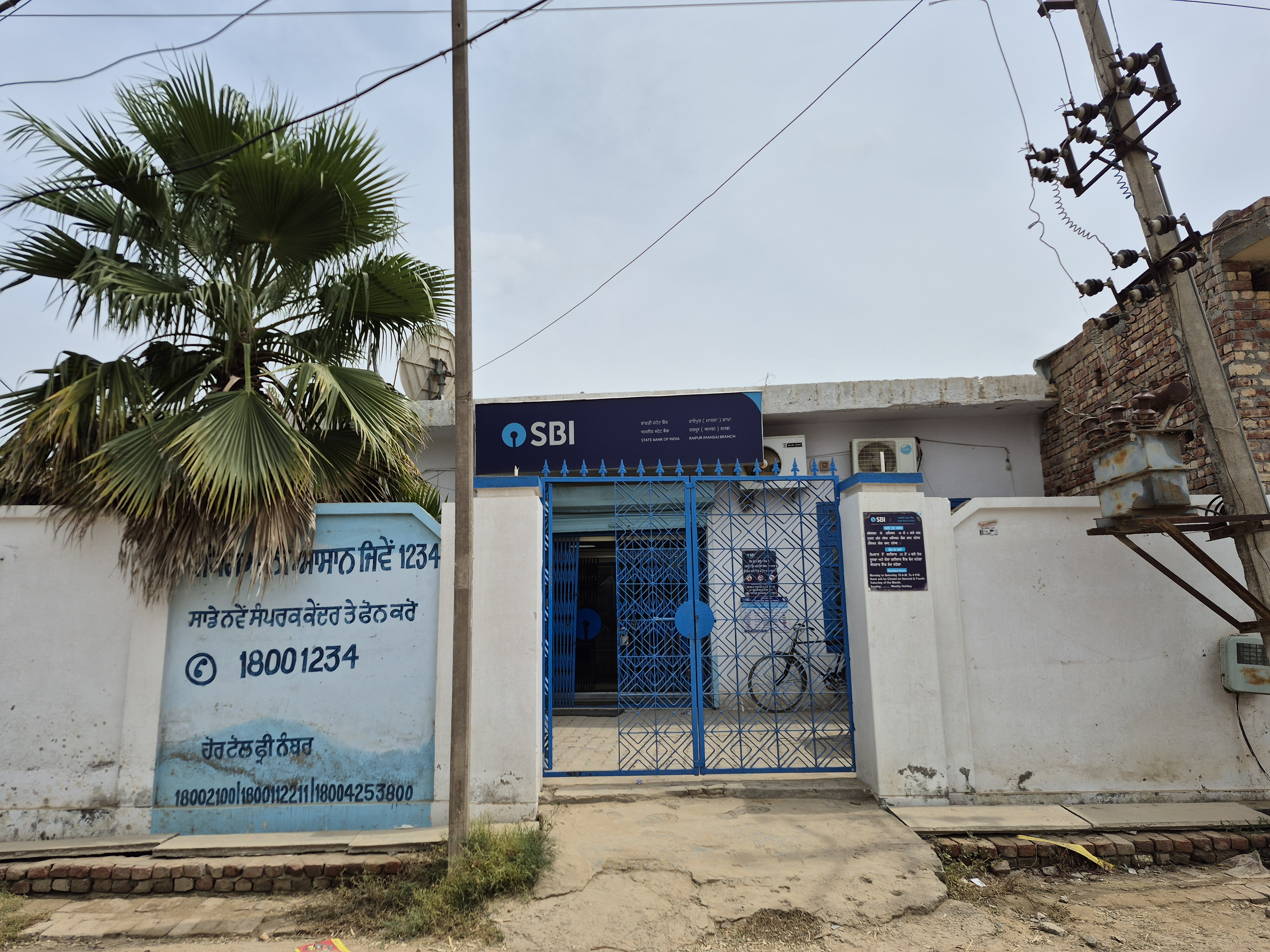
State Bank of India

The village has a branch of the State Bank of India located near the government primary school.

=== Agriculture ===
As is common in the region, agriculture is the main occupation as well as the main source of income for all Jatts. There is a very good irrigation water supply from the canal and when the canal dries up, people used to run their tube wells as a backup. Wheat, mustard and cotton are the main crops in the area.

=== Other ===
In the minorities, Hindus, have their shops, general and medical stores etc. Others do labour in the fields or are employed by the newly constructed 2700 megawatt-capacity Talwandi Sabo Power Plant on the outskirts of the village.

== Infrastructure ==
The village has a power grid, water works and reverse osmosis plant for filtered water service and an animal dispensary.

== Gallery ==
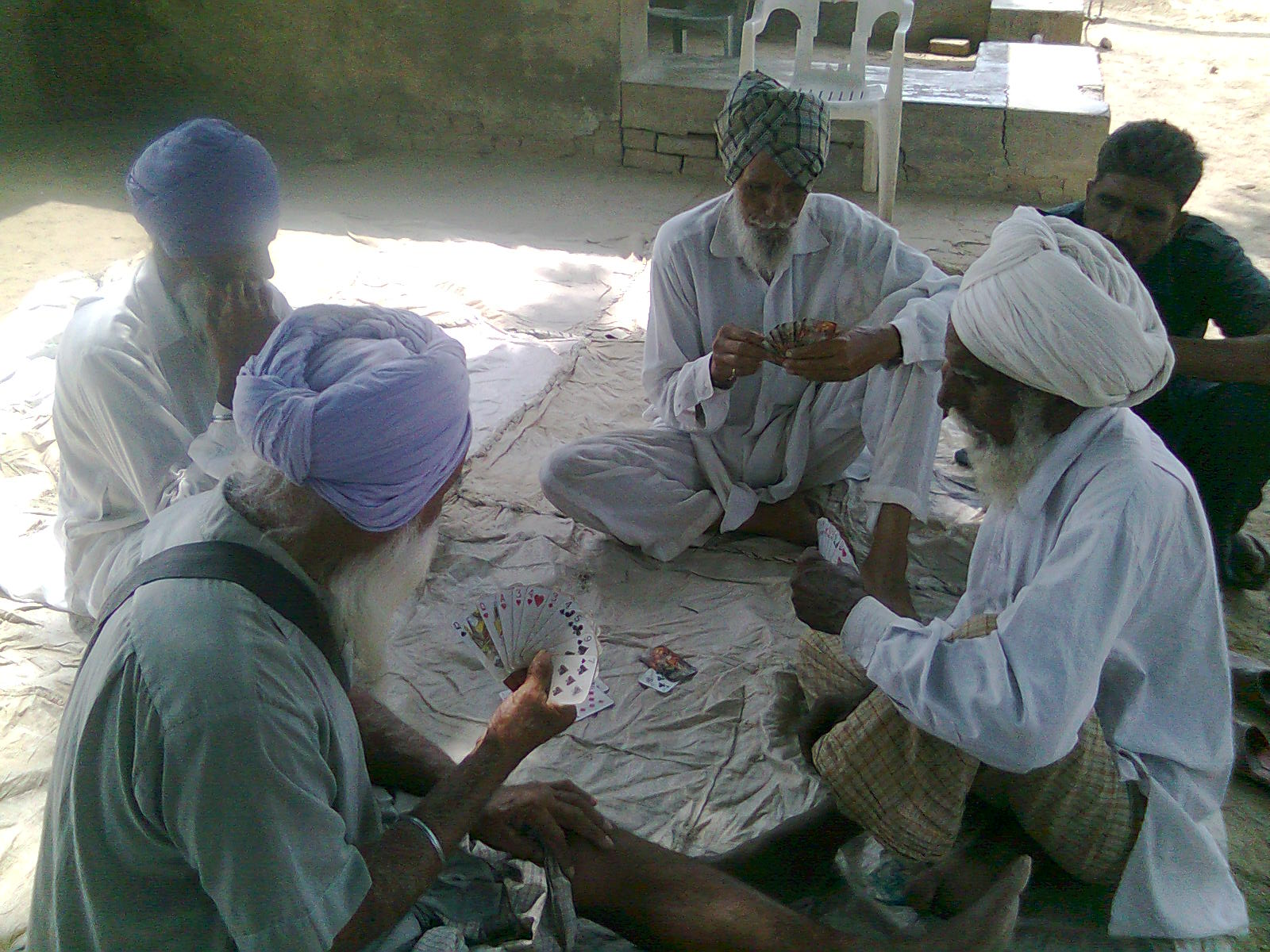
Locals playing cards

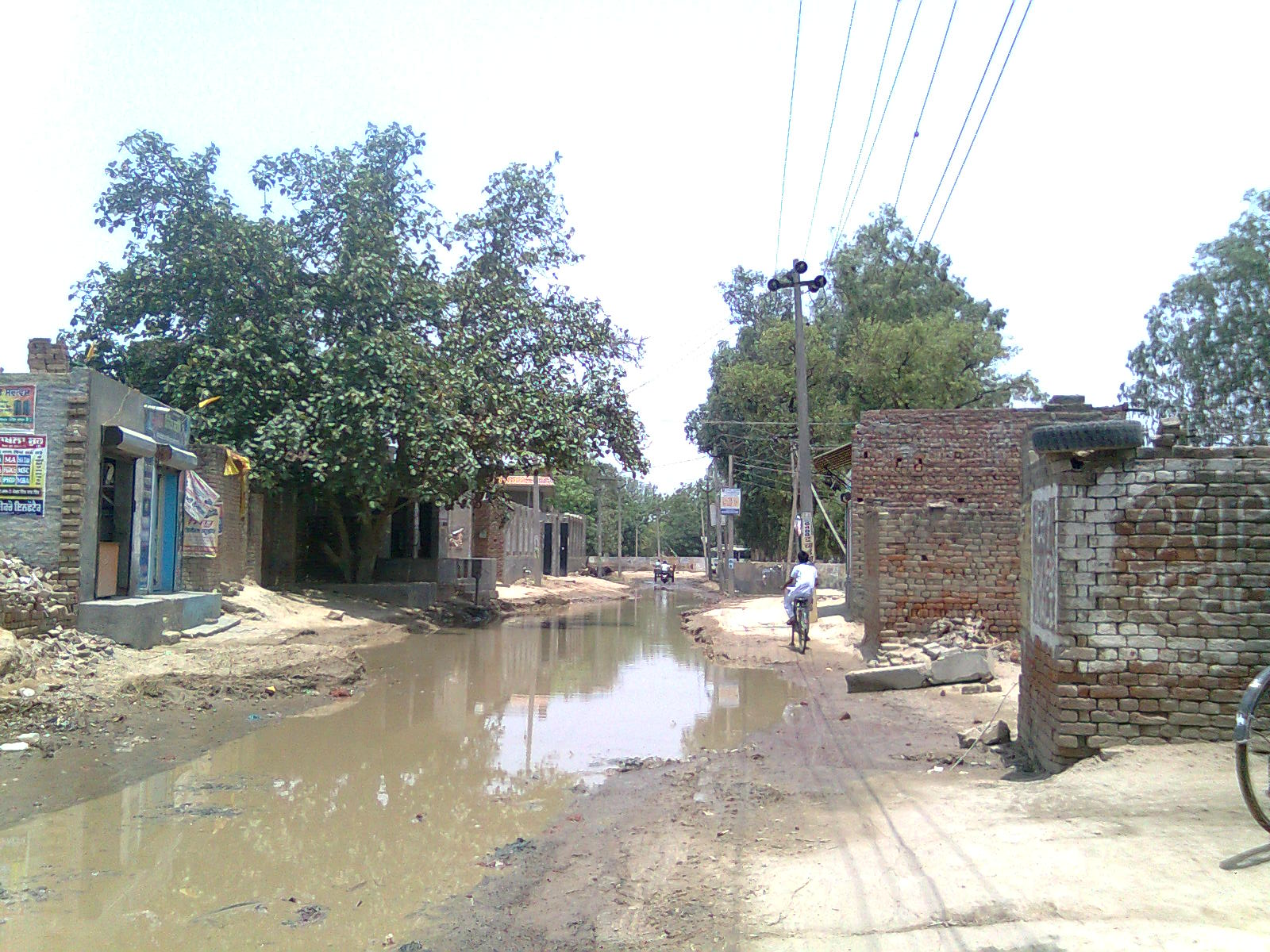
Flooded phirni road, 2012

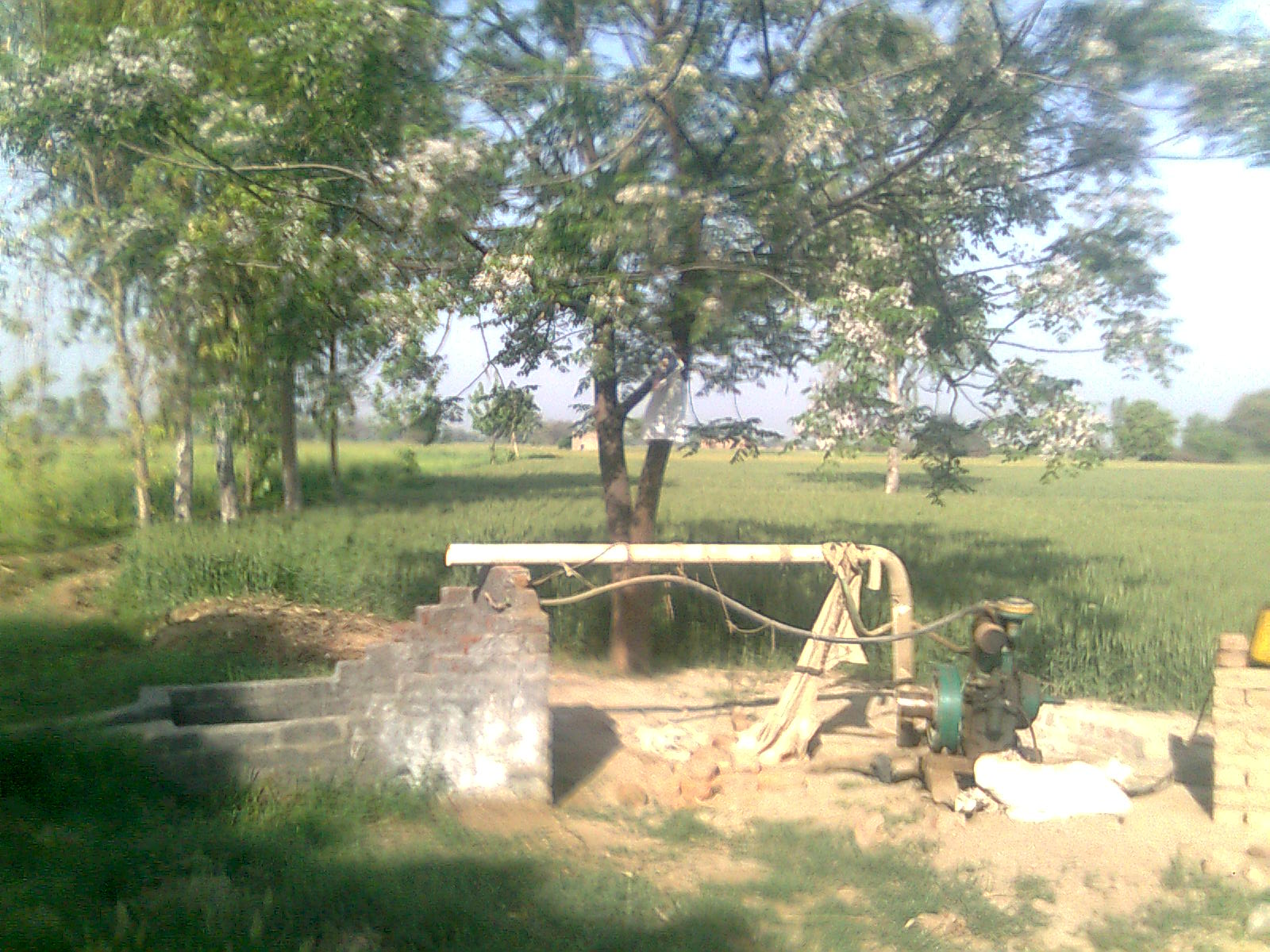
A tube well in the local fields

== See also ==
- Akkan Wali
- Chachohar
- Khiali Chehlan Wali
- Kila Raipur
- Lakhmir Wala
- Ullak
