= Tandian =

- Village
- Location in Punjab, India Tandian (India)
- Coordinates: 29.872°N 75.232°E
- Country: India
- State: Punjab
- District: Mansa
- Talukas: Sardulgarh

Government
  - Type: Panchayati raj (India)
  - Body: Gram panchayat

Languages
  - Official: Punjabi
  - Regional: Punjabi
- Time zone: UTC+5:30 (IST)

Tandian (sometimes spelled as Tandiyan) is a village in Sardulgarh tehsil of Mansa district in Punjab, India.

== Geography ==
The village is approximately centered at 29°52′19″N 75°13′55″E. Nangla, Jherian Wali (Bishanpura), Bana Wala, Behniwal, Peron and Raipur are the surrounding villages.

== Culture ==
Punjabi is the mother tongue as well as the official language of the village.

=== Religion ===
The villagers predominantly are Sikhs and follows Sikhism.

== Education and economy ==
Education

The village has a government school which upgraded to high in 2011-12.

Economy

As common in the region, agriculture is the main source of income with nearby employers.
