= Makha, Mansa district =

Makha
- Village
- Location in Punjab, India Makha (India)
- Coordinates: 29.938°N 75.298°E
- Country: India
- State: Punjab
- District: Mansa
- Talukas: Sardulgarh

Languages
  - Official: Punjabi
  - Regional: Punjabi
- Time zone: UTC+5:30 (IST)

Makha is a village in Sardulgarh tehsil of Mansa district in Punjab, India.

== Geography ==
Makha is approximately centered at 29°56′17″N 75°17′53″E. Talwandi Aklia, Chhapian Wali, Gharangna, Uddat Bhagat Ram, Maujia and Raipur are the surrounding villages.
