= Peron, Punjab =

Peron
- Village
- Location in Punjab, India Peron (India)
- Coordinates: 29.907°N 75.202°E
- Country: India
- State: Punjab
- District: Mansa
- Tehsil: Sardulgarh

Government
  - Type: Panchayati raj (India)
  - Body: Gram panchayat

Languages
  - Official: Punjabi
  - Regional: Punjabi
- Time zone: UTC+5:30 (IST)

Peron (sometimes spelled wrong as Pairon or Perron) is a village in Sardulgarh tehsil of Mansa district in Punjab, India. The village falls under the market committee of Talwandi Sabo (Bathinda district).

== Geography ==
Peron is approximately centered at 29°54′25″N 75°12′07″E. Raipur, Bana Wala, Talwandi Aklia, Chhapian Wali, Behniwal, Singo are the surrounding villages. The village has a government primary school.
