= Maujia =

- village
- Location in Punjab, India Maujia (India)
- Coordinates: 29.924°N 75.325°E
- Country: India
- State: Punjab
- District: Mansa
- Talukas: Mansa

Population (2001)
  - Total: 1,251

Languages
  - Official: Punjabi (Gurmukhi script)
  - Regional: Punjabi
- Time zone: UTC+5:30 (IST)
- Nearest city: Mansa
- Sex ratio: 1000/870 ♂/♀

Maujia (sometimes spelled wrong as Maujiya or Moujiya) is a village in the tehsil and district of Mansa in Punjab, India. It is a notable village of the area as a huge operation between the Indian Army and Babbar Khalsa members took place here in September, 1991.

== Geography ==
Maujia is approximately centered at 29°55′26″N 75°19′30″E. The city of Mansa, lies 8 km to its north. Surrounding villages include Dulowal, Baje Wala, Chhapian Wali, Talwandi Aklia (Chhoti Talwandi), Gharangna and Uddat Bhagat Ram.

== Demographics ==
In 2001, according to the census, the village had a total population of 1,251 with 219 households, 669 males and 582 females. Thus males constitute 53% and females 47% of the population with a sex ratio of 870 females per thousand males.

== The 1991 operation ==
In the month of September 1991, the police got informed that there were some Babbars stayed in the village of Maujia. On the information, the police surrounded the village on the evening of 7 September and then intense firing started on both sides in which Bhai Paramjeet Sikh Phulewal, Bhai Khem Singh Fauji (Badal Kalan) and Bhai Gurmel Singh of Raipur were killed.
