= Bire Wala Jattan =

- Village
- Nickname: Bire Wala/Beere Wala
- Location in Punjab, India Bire Wala Jattan (India)
- Coordinates: 29.870°N 75.281°E
- Country: India
- State: Punjab
- District: Mansa
- Talukas: Sardulgarh

Area
  - Total: 5.41 km^{2} (2.09 sq mi)

Languages
  - Official: Punjabi
  - Regional: Punjabi
- Time zone: UTC+5:30 (IST)
- Nearest city: Mansa

Bire Wala Jattan (also spelled as Beere Wala Jattan or Birewala Jattan) is a village in Sardulgarh tehsil of Mansa district in Punjab, India. It falls under the development block of Jhunir and the district main city of Mansa is just 21 km away.

== Geography ==
The village is approximately centered at 29°52′12″N 75°16′52″E. Jherian Wali, Mian, Burj Bhalaike, Baje Wala and Raipur are the surrounding villages.

== Demographics ==
In 2001, as of census, the village had a total population of 1,342 persons.
