= Chehlan Wala =

- Village
- Location in Punjab, India Chehlan Wala (India)
- Coordinates: 29.952°N 75.217°E
- Country: India
- State: Punjab
- District: Mansa
- Talukas: Sardulgarh

Government
  - Type: Panchayati raj (India)
  - Body: Gram panchayat

Languages
  - Official: Punjabi
  - Regional: Punjabi
- Time zone: UTC+5:30 (IST)
- Nearest city: Talwandi Sabo

Chehlan Wala (also spelled as Chahlan Wal or Chehlanwala) is a village in Sardulgarh tehsil of Mansa district in Punjab, India. The village was on the list for more than 90% of voting in the February 2012 elections.

== Geography ==
The village is approximately centered at 29°57′07″N 75°13′01″E. Kamalu, Behniwal and Bana Wala are the surrounding villages.
