= Bhalaike =

Bhalaike Bhalai
- Village
- Interactive map of Bhalaike
- Location in Punjab, India Bhalaike (India)
- Coordinates: 29.857242°N 75.303950°E
- Country: India
- State: Punjab
- District: Mansa
- Talukas: Sardulgarh

Population (2011)
  - Total: 1,457

Languages
  - Official: Punjabi (Gurmukhi)
  - Regional: Punjabi
- Time zone: UTC+5:30 (IST)
- PIN: 151506
- Vehicle registration: PB51

Bhalaike, sometimes spelled Bhalai, is a village in the Sardulgarh tehsil of Mansa district in Punjab, India.
