= Jhanduke =

- village
- Location in Punjab, India Jhanduke (India)
- Coordinates: 29.747799°N 75.3411001°E
- Country: India
- State: Punjab
- District: Mansa
- Tehsil: Sardulgarh

Government
  - Type: Panchayati raj (India)
  - Body: Gram panchayat

Population (2011)
  - Total: 5,220

Languages
  - Official: Punjabi
  - Regional: Punjabi
- Time zone: UTC+5:30 (IST)
- PIN: 151506
- Telephone code: 01659

Jhanduke (sometimes spelled as Jhanduka) is a village in the Sardulgarh tehsil of Mansa district in Punjab, India. Jhunir is the surrounding village.

== Demographics ==
According to 2011 census of India

| Subject | Total | Male | Female |
|---|---|---|---|
| Number of houses | 991 | | |
| Population | 5,220 | 2709 | 2511 |
| Children (0-6) | 617 | 329 | 288 |
| Scheduled Caste | 1,800 | 922 | 878 |
| Backward class | 0 | 0 | 0 |
| Literacy rate | 55.62 % | 62.39 % | 48.36 % |
| Workers | 2,245 | 1,543 | 702 |
| Main workers | 1,980 | 0 | 0 |
| Marginal workers | 265 | 107 | 158 |

== Religion ==
The population mostly follows the Sikhism with Hinduism.
