= Chotian, Mansa =

Chotian
- village
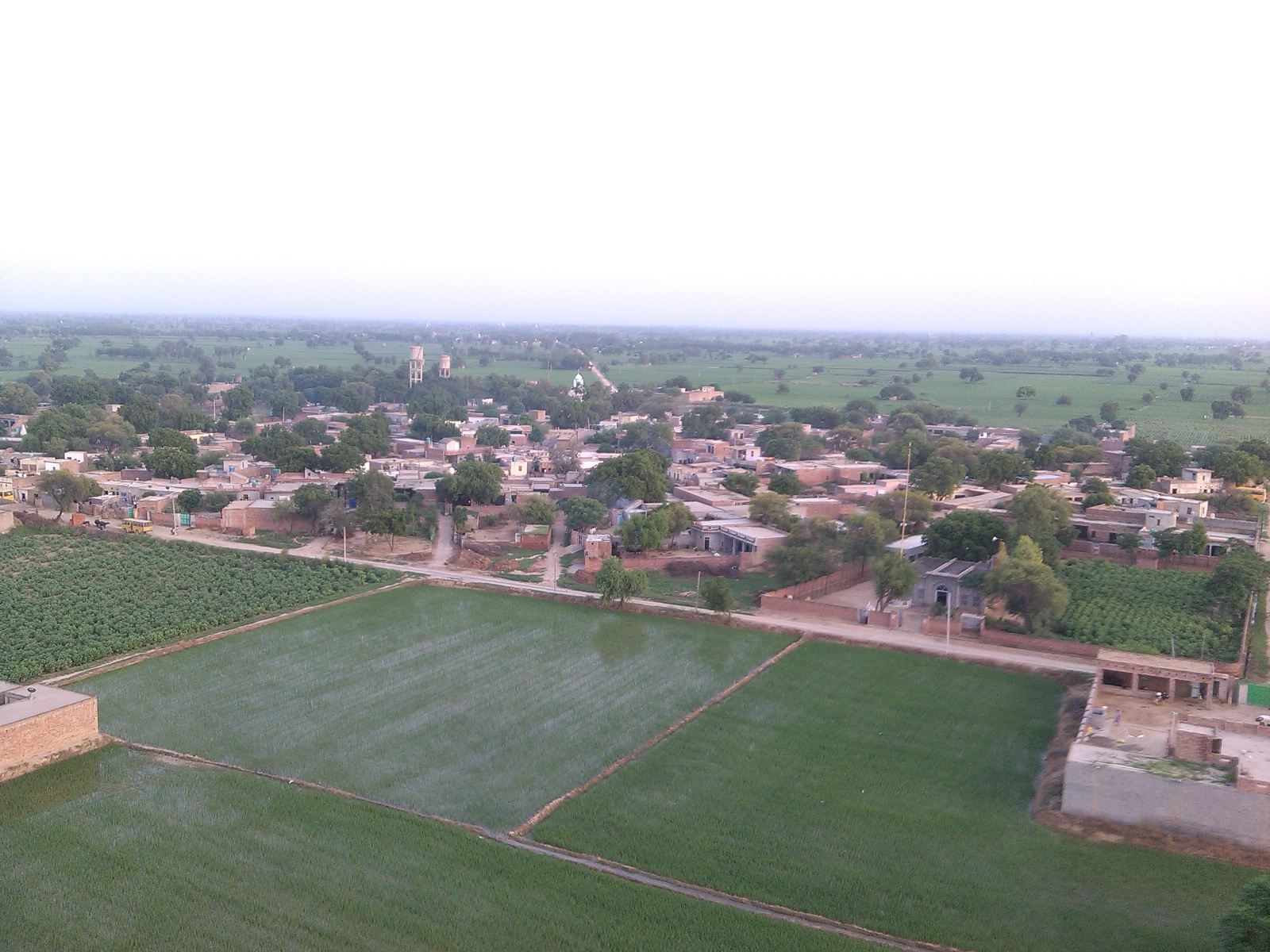
- A view of the village Chotian

- Location in Punjab, India Chotian (India)
- Coordinates: 29.71996°N 75.3372°E
- Country: India
- State: Punjab
- District: Mansa
- Tehsil: Sardulgarh

Government
  - Type: Panchayati raj (India)
  - Body: Gram panchayat

Population (2011)
  - Total: 1,263

Languages
  - Official: Punjabi
  - Regional: Punjabi
- Time zone: UTC+5:30 (IST)
- PIN: 151506
- Telephone code: 01659

Chotian (sometimes spelled as Chotia) is a village in the Sardulgarh tehsil of Mansa district in Punjab, India. Jhunir is the surrounding village.

== Geography ==
Chotian is located 36 km towards South from District headquarters Mansa, 11 km from Sardulewala and 209 km from State capital Chandigarh. Chotian's Pin code is 151506 and postal office is Adamke. Alike (3 km), Mirpur Kalan (3 km), Ranjitgarh Bandran (5 km), Lohgarh (5 km) and Jhanduke (5 km) are the nearby Villages. it is surrounded by Jhunir tehsil towards North, Ratia tehsil towards East, Fatehabad tehsil towards South, Mansa tehsil towards North. Ratia, Fatehabad, Mansa, Budhlada and Sardulgarh are the nearby Cities to Chotian.
This Place is in the border of the Mansa district and Fatehabad District.

== Demographics ==
| Subject | Total | Male | Female |
|---|---|---|---|
| Number of houses | 243 | | |
| Population | 1,263 | 672 | 591 |
| Children (0–6) | 115 | 71 | 44 |
| Scheduled Caste | 538 | 287 | 251 |
| Backward class | 0 | 0 | 0 |
| Literacy rate | 62.80% | 71.38% | 53.38% |
| Workers | 474 | 392 | 82 |
| Main workers | 472 | 0 | 0 |
| Medium workers | 2 | 2 | 0 |

At the 2001 census, Chotian had a total population of 1,172 and at the 2011 census, Chotian had a total population of 1,263 with 2,43 households, 672 males and 591 females.

== Religion ==
The population mostly follows the Sikhism with Hinduism.
