= Karandi, Punjab =

Karandi
- Village
- Location in Punjab, India Karandi (India)
- Coordinates: 29.607566°N 75.285144°E
- Country: India
- State: Punjab
- District: Mansa
- Talukas: Sardulgarh

Languages
  - Official: Punjabi
  - Regional: Punjabi
- Time zone: UTC+5:30 (IST)
- ISO 3166 code: IN-PB
- Nearest city: Sardulgarh

Karandi (sometimes spelled as Krandi) is a village in Sardulgarh tehsil of Mansa district in Punjab, India. The last village of the tehsil, is located at the border of Punjab and Haryana states.

== Geography ==
Karandi approximately centered at 29°36′27″N 75°17′08″E. It is located at the border of Punjab and Haryana states at only 8 km from Sardulgarh. Khaira Khurd, Nahran and Sangha are the surrounding villages on Punjab side.

== Education ==
- Punjabi University Neighbourhood Campus
- Government senior secondary school.

== See also ==
- Sardulgarh
