= Jaurkian =

- Village
- Interactive map of Jaurkian
- Location in Punjab, India Jaurkian (India)
- Coordinates: 29.850336°N 75.208504°E
- Country: India
- State: Punjab
- District: Mansa
- Talukas: Sardulgarh

Area
  - Total: 9.11 km^{2} (3.52 sq mi)

Languages
  - Official: Punjabi (Gurmukhi)
  - Regional: Punjabi
- Time zone: UTC+5:30 (IST)
- PIN: 151505
- Vehicle registration: PB51

Jaurkian, is a village in the Sardulgarh tehsil of Mansa district in Punjab, India.

== Geography ==
Jaurkian is located at 29.850336°N 75.208504°E in the Mansa district of Indian Punjab.

== Education ==
There is a Govt. Primary School and a Govt. Sen. Sec. School in Jaurkian.
