= Chotian =

Chotian may refer to:

== Places ==
- Chotian, Mansa, village in Mansa district, Punjab, India
- Chotian, Sangrur, village in Sangrur district, Punjab, India
