= Ghuduwala, Mansa =

Village in Mansa District, Punjab, India

Ghuduwala Ghudu wala
- Village
- Interactive map of Ghuduwala
- Location in Punjab, India Ghuduwala (India)
- Coordinates: 29.810710°N 75.295733°E
- Country: India
- State: Punjab
- District: Mansa
- Talukas: Sardulgarh

Population (2011)
  - Total: 1,429

Languages
  - Official: Punjabi (Gurmukhi)
  - Regional: Punjabi
- Time zone: UTC+5:30 (IST)
- PIN: 151506
- Telephone code: 01659-26*****
- Vehicle registration: PB51
- Nearest city: Sardulgarh

Ghuduwala or Ghudu wala, is a village in the Sardulgarh tehsil of Mansa district in Punjab, India.

== Demography ==
Ghuduwala is the gram panchayat. According to Census 2011, village has a total population of 1,429 peoples, out of which male population is 700 while female population is 729. Literacy rate of village is 47.31% out of which 53.00% males and 41.84% females are literate. There are about 268 houses in village.
