= Ghuduwala (disambiguation) =

Ghuduwala is a Punjabi name, it may refer to:

- Ghuduwala, Mansa, village in Mansa district, Punjab, India
- Ghuduwala, village in Faridkot district, Punjab, India
- Ghuduwal, village in Jalandhar district, Punjab, India
