= Bana Wala =

- Village
- Location in Punjab, India Bana Wala (India)
- Coordinates: 29.939°N 75.231°E
- Country: India
- State: Punjab
- District: Mansa

Languages
  - Official: Punjabi
  - Regional: Punjabi
- Time zone: UTC+5:30 (IST)

Bana Wala (sometimes spelled Banawala) is a small village in Mansa district of Punjab, India. It has become a noted village of Punjab as a new Talwandi Sabo Power Plant, with the capacity of 2640 megawatt, is under construction here.

== Geography ==
Bana Wala is approximately centered at 29°56′20″N 75°13′52″E. Raipur, Peron, Chhapian Wali, Talwandi Aklia (Chhoti Talwandi), Chehlan Wala and Behniwal are the surrounding villages.

== Culture ==
Punjabi is the mother tongue as well as the official language here. The villagers mainly belongs to the Maanshahia clan of Jatt people.

The population mainly follows the Sikhism.

== Power plant ==
The Talwandi Sabo Power Limited Thermal Plant is just under construction and will be running from the end of 2012. It has the capacity of 1980 megawatt if three units and 2640 megawatt if four units, having 660 megawatt each.
