= Moujiya =

Moujiya may refer to:

- Moujiya (video game), a falling blocks puzzle game owned by Fujitsu
- Maujia, also spelled Moujiya among other romanisations, a village in Punjab, India
