= Kahangarh =

Village in India

Kahangarh is a village and panchayat in Mansa district, Punjab, India. it is situated on Delhi-Ferozepur railway line.
