= Jhunir =

- town
- Location in Punjab, India Jhunir (India)
- Coordinates: 29.808°N 75.3455°E
- Country: India
- State: Punjab
- District: Mansa
- Founder: Baba Nanak
- Talukas: Sardulgarh

Population (2019)
  - Total: 7,159

Languages
  - Official: Punjabi (Gurmukhi)
  - Regional: Punjabi
- Time zone: UTC+5:30 (IST)
- PIN: 151506
- Telephone code: 01659-26*****
- Vehicle registration: PB51
- Nearest city: Mansa
- Sex ratio: 1000/883 ♂/♀

Jhunir, sometimes spelled Jhuner, is a town in the Sardulgarh tehsil of Mansa district in Punjab, India. It is also a block of the district.

== Geography ==
Jhunir is located at 29°48′29″N 75°20′44″E on State Highway 13, in the Mansa district of Indian Punjab. Mansa is the nearest railway station, lying 20 kilometres (12 mi) to its north, Sardulgarh (17 km) to the southwest, the city and district of Bathinda to the northeast and the city and district of Sangrur to the northeast. The block has the total area of 34,488 square kilometres (13,316 sq mi).

== Demographics ==
At the 2011 census, Jhunir had a total population of 7,159 with 1,429 households, 3,703 males and 3,456 females. Thus males constituted 52% and females 48% of the population with the sex ratio of 883 females per thousand males.

== As a development block ==
As a development block of the district it has many villages under it including, Raipur, Khiali Chehlan Wali, Burj Bhalaike, Bire Wala Jattan and Ullak.
