= Nangal Kalan =

- city
- Location in Punjab, India
- Coordinates: 29.92°N 75.40°E
- Country: India
- State: Punjab
- District: Mansa
- Elevation: 212 m (696 ft)

Population (2011)
  - Total: 7,031

Languages
  - Official: Punjabi
- Time zone: UTC+5:30 (IST)
- PIN: 151505
- Telephone code: 01652
- Vehicle registration: PB-31
- Website: www.NangalKalan.net

Nangal Kalan is one of the biggest villages of Mansa district, Punjab, India. It's 7 kilometres (4.3 mi) away from the city Mansa and 2 kilometres (1.2 mi) away from Mansa-Sirsa Road. The population is Punjabi-speaking and is wedded to the Malwa culture of Punjab.

Nangal Kalan is situated in the cotton belt of Punjab.

== Geography ==
Nangal Kalan is located at 29.92°N 75.40°E. It has an average elevation of 212 metres (695 feet).
