= Baje Wala =

- village
- Location in Punjab, India Baje Wala (India)
- Coordinates: 29.885°N 75.3°E
- Country: India
- State: Punjab
- District: Mansa
- Tehsil: Sardulgarh

Government
  - Type: Panchayati raj (India)
  - Body: Gram panchayat

Languages
  - Official: Punjabi
  - Regional: Punjabi
- Time zone: UTC+5:30 (IST)
- PIN: 151505
- Telephone code: 01659

Baje Wala (sometimes spelled as Bajewala) is a village in the Sardulgarh tehsil of Mansa district in Punjab, India. Chhapian Wali, Raman Nandi, Bire Wala Jattan and Raipur are the surrounding villages.
