= Behniwal, Punjab =

Behniwal ਬਹਿਣੀਵਾਲ
- Village
- Location in Punjab, India Behniwal (India) Behniwal (South Asia)
- Coordinates: 29.929°N 75.195°E
- Country: India
- State: Punjab
- District: Mansa

Area
  - Land: 1,253 ha (3,100 acres)
- Elevation: 222 m (728 ft)

Population (2011)
  - Total: 3,741
  - Density: 298.6/km^{2} (773.3/sq mi)

Languages
  - Official: Punjabi
  - Regional: Punjabi
- Time zone: UTC+5:30 (IST)
- < PIN -->: 151305
- Vehicle registration: PB 31

Behniwal (Note: Sometimes spelt as Beniwal) (Punjabi (Gurmukhi): ਬਹਿਣੀਵਾਲ) is a village in the Mansa district of Punjab, India. It falls under the market committee of Mansa.

== Geography ==
Behniwal is approximately centered at 29°55′44″N 75°11′42″E. Raipur, Chehlan Wala, Peron and Bana Wala are the surrounding villages. The size of Behniwal is 1253 hectares. It is also 222 metres above sea level.

== Demographics ==
As of the 2011 census of India, there were 3741 residents. 1987 of them were male, and 1754 of them were female. There were 460 children between the ages 0 to 6. The village held 797 households, and out of the 3741 residents, 1843 of them were illiterate. Therefore the literacy rate of Behniwal was 50.74% in which 55.91% of males and 44.87% of females were literate. Sikhism is the dominant religion in Behniwal, comprising the vast majority of the population. There is a large gurdwara in Behniwal that the villagers use. Hinduism is the second-largest religion in Behniwal, and there is a Mandir just 110 metres away from the gurdwara.

== Transportation ==
The village is located on Mansa-Talwandi Road, therefore it is well connected with both cities through buses and some owns vehicles.

== Hotels ==
There is a one resort and a Dhaba where people can stay at night and day.

== Health facilities ==
The village has one hospital with good doctors, a private dispensary, and one medical store for animals with good doctors and medicines available. There is a gym and a ground.

== Education ==
There are four schools in the village:

- Govt. High School
- Silver Bells International School
- Akal Sahai School
- and Mata Gujri Public School.

== Economy ==
There is a branch of the State Bank of Patiala. Agriculture is the main source of income.
