= Mansa Solar Power Plant =

Solar photovoltaic power generating station

- Country: India
- Status: Operational
- Commission date: 29 September 2016
- Construction cost: ₹ 200 crore

Solar farm
- Type: Flat-panel PV

Power generation
- Nameplate capacity: 31.5 MW

Mansa Solar Power Plant is a 31.5 MW solar photovoltaic power generating station at Mirpur Kalan village of Mansa district in Punjab state of India.

Built by Hindustan Power, it is the largest single location solar power plant in Punjab with a capacity of 31.5 MW. The plant is spread over 173 acres and project cost is over ₹ 200 crore.

The plant was inaugurated on 29 September 2016 by Sukhbir Singh Badal, Deputy Chief Minister of Punjab.

== See also ==
- Solar power in India
- Renewable energy in India
