= Pharwahi, Mansa =

Village in Punjab, India

Pharwahi Kishangarh
- Village
- Location in Punjab, India Pharwahi (India)
- Coordinates: 30°01′05″N 75°30′50″E
- Country: India
- State: Punjab
- District: Mansa

Area
  - Total: 6.32 km^{2} (2.44 sq mi)

Population (2011)
  - Total: 4,121
  - Density: 652/km^{2} (1,690/sq mi)

Languages
  - Official: Punjabi (Gurmukhi)
  - Regional: Punjabi
- Time zone: UTC+5:30 (IST)
- PIN: 151502

Kishangarh urf Pharwahi village is located in Mansa tehsil of Mansa district in Punjab, India.

== Demographics ==
| Particulars | Total | Male | Female |
|---|---|---|---|
| Total No. Of Houses | 794 | | |
| Population | 4121 | 2218 | 1903 |
| Child (0-6) | 466 | 268 | 198 |
| Schedule Caste | 1715 | 910 | 805 |
| Schedule Tribe | 0 | 0 | 0 |
| Literacy | 60.52% | 66.15% | 54.08% |
| Total Workers | 1925 | 1208 | 717 |
| Main Workers | 1211 | 0 | 0 |
| Marginal Workers | 714 | 98 | 616 |

Table; Census 2011, Data Of Pharwahi, Mansa (Punjab)
