= Dulowal =

- Village
- Location in Punjab, India Dulowal (India)
- Coordinates: 29.926796°N 75.363080°E
- Country: India
- State: Punjab
- District: Kapurthala

Government
  - Type: Panchayati raj (India)
  - Body: Gram panchayat

Population (2011)
  - Total: 946
- Sex ratio 504/442♂/♀

Languages
  - Official: Punjabi
  - Other spoken: Hindi
- Time zone: UTC+5:30 (IST)
- PIN: 144601
- Telephone code: 01822
- ISO 3166 code: IN-PB
- Vehicle registration: PB-09
- Website: kapurthala.gov.in

Dulowal is a village in Kapurthala district of Punjab State, India. It is located 15 kilometres (9.3 mi) from Kapurthala, which is both the district and sub-district headquarters of Dulowal. The village is administrated by a Sarpanch, who is an elected representative.

== Demography ==
According to the report published by Census India in 2011, Dulowal has a total number of 195 houses and population of 946 of which include 504 males and 442 females. Literacy rate of Dulowal is 74.29%, lower than state average of 75.84%. The population of children under the age of 6 years is 102 which is 10.78% of total population of Dulowal, and child sex ratio is approximately 645, lower than state average of 846.

As per census 2011, 313 people were engaged in work activities out of the total population of Dulowal which includes 268 males and 45 females. According to census survey report 2011, 75.08% workers describe their work as main work and 24.92% workers are involved in Marginal activity providing livelihood for less than 6 months.

== Caste ==
The village has schedule caste (SC) constitutes 57.93% of total population of the village and it doesn't have any Schedule Tribe (ST) population.

== Population data ==
Particulars	Total	Male	Female
Total No. of Houses	195	-	-
Population	946	504	442
Child (0-6)	102	62	40
Schedule Caste	548	299	249
Schedule Tribe	0	0	0
Literacy	74.29 %	79.19 %	68.91 %
Total Workers	313	268	45
Main Worker	235	0	0
Marginal Worker	78	52	26

== Air travel connectivity ==
The closest airport to the village is Sri Guru Ram Dass Jee International Airport.
