= Chotian, Sangrur =

Village in Sangrur district, Punjab, India

Chotian
- Village
- Interactive map of Chotian
- Location in Punjab, India Chotian (India)
- Coordinates: 29.5045906°N 75.4723422°E
- Country: India
- State: Punjab
- District: Sangrur

Population (2011)
  - Total: 3,334

Languages
  - Official: Punjabi (Gurmukhi)
  - Regional: Punjabi
- Time zone: UTC+5:30 (IST)
- PIN: 148031
- Nearest city: Lehragaga

Chotian, is a village in the Sangrur district of Punjab, India.

== Geography ==
Chotian is located at 29.5045906°N 75.4723422°E in the Sangrur district of Indian Punjab.

== Demographics ==
According to 2011 census, the total population of the village is 3334 and number of houses are 637. Female Population is 47.4%. Literacy rate is 49.9% and the Female Literacy rate is 20.7%.
