= Ullak =

- Village
- Location in Punjab, India Ullak (India)
- Coordinates: 29.835814°N 75.251563°E
- Country: India
- State: Punjab
- District: Mansa
- Tehsil: Sardulgarh

Government
  - Type: Panchayati raj (India)
  - Body: Gram panchayat

Languages
  - Official: Punjabi
  - Regional: Punjabi
- Time zone: UTC+5:30 (IST)

Ullak is a village in Sardulgarh tehsil of Mansa district of Punjab, India.
