= Burj Bhalaike =

Village in Mansa District, Punjab, India

Burj Bhalaike Burj Bhalai
- Village
- Interactive map of Burj Bhalaike
- Location in Punjab, India Burj Bhalaike (India)
- Coordinates: 29.842356°N 75.274630°E
- Country: India
- State: Punjab
- District: Mansa
- Talukas: Sardulgarh

Area
  - Total: 6.32 km^{2} (2.44 sq mi)
- Elevation: 214 m (702 ft)

Population (2011)
  - Total: 1,737
  - Density: 275/km^{2} (712/sq mi)

Languages
  - Official: Punjabi (Gurmukhi)
  - Regional: Punjabi
- Time zone: UTC+5:30 (IST)
- PIN: 151505
- Telephone code: 01659-26*****
- Vehicle registration: PB51
- Nearest city: Mansa

Burj Bhalaike, sometimes spelled Buraj Bhalaike, or Burj Bhalai (Gurmukhi: ਬੁਰਜ ਭਲਾਈਕੇ), is a village in the Sardulgarh tehsil of Mansa district in Punjab, India.

== Geography ==
Burj Bhalaike is located at 29.842356°N 75.274630°E in the Mansa district of Indian Punjab. Mansa is the nearest railway station, lying 28 kilometres (17 mi) to its north, Sardulgarh (22 km) to the southwest, the city and district of Bathinda to the northwest and the city and district of Sangrur to the northeast.

== Education ==
There is a Govt. Primary School and a Govt. High School in Burj Bhalaike.

== Gallery ==
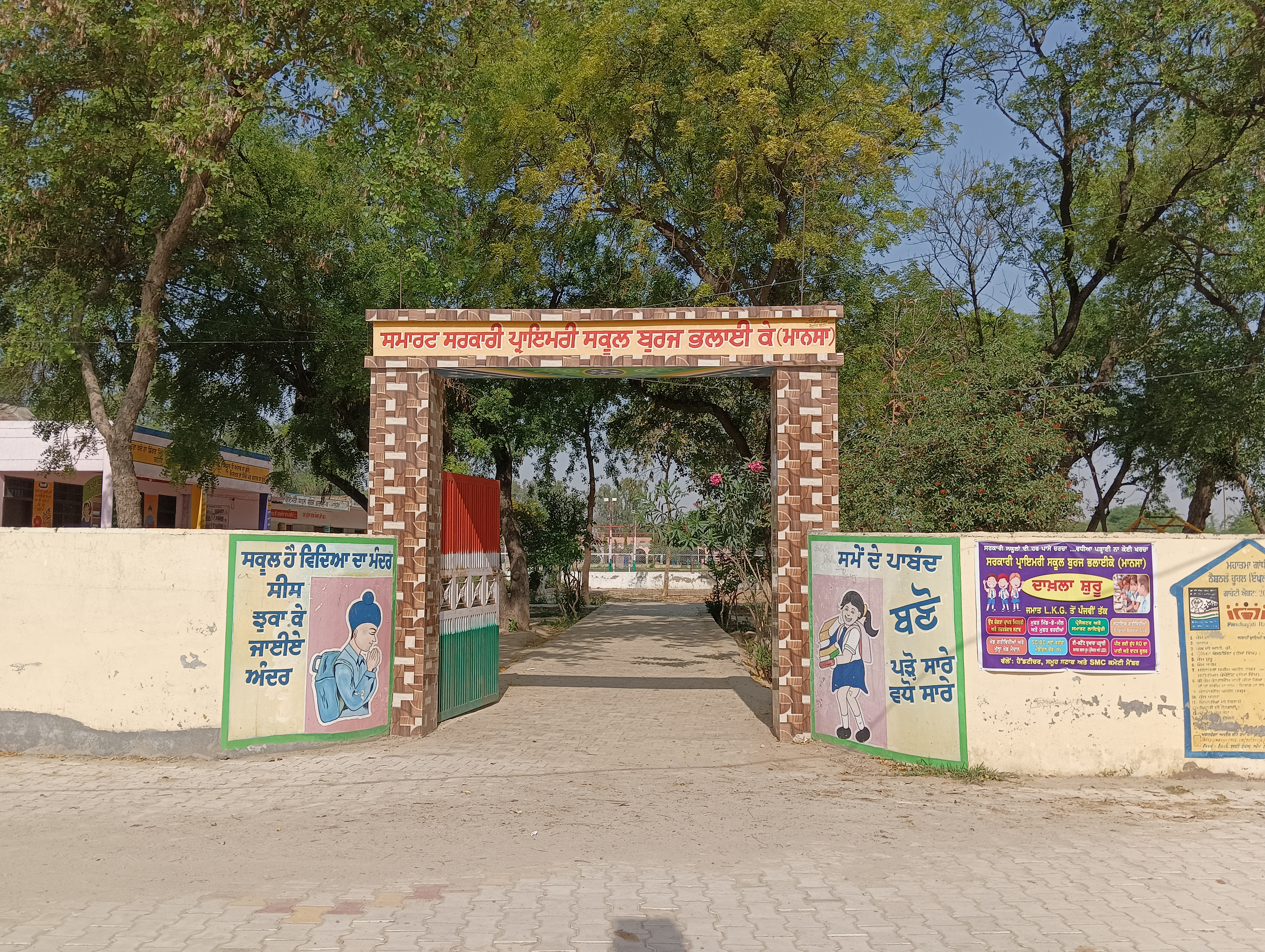
Government Primary School Burj Bhalaike Main Gate

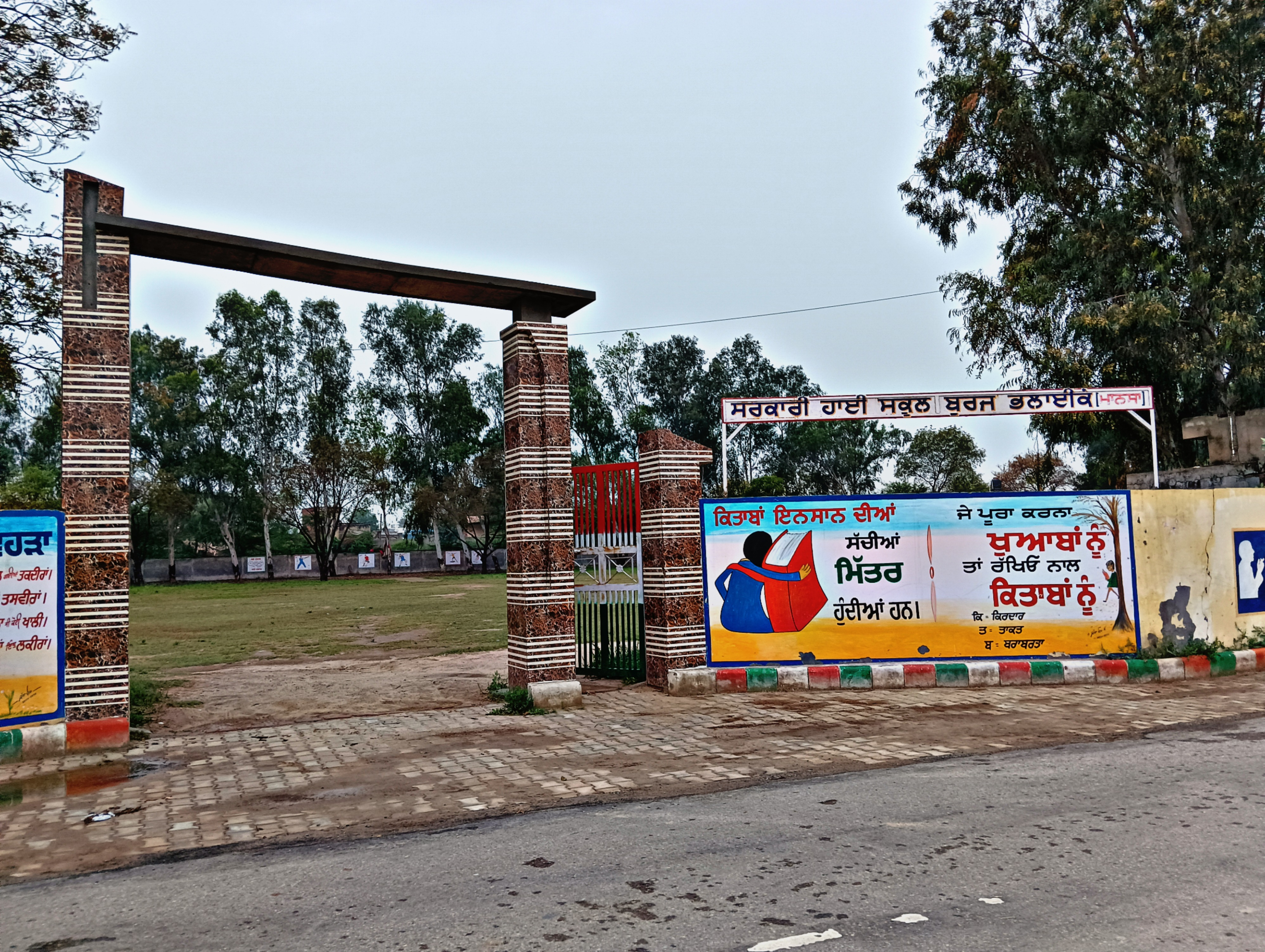
Government High School Burj Bhalaike Main Gate

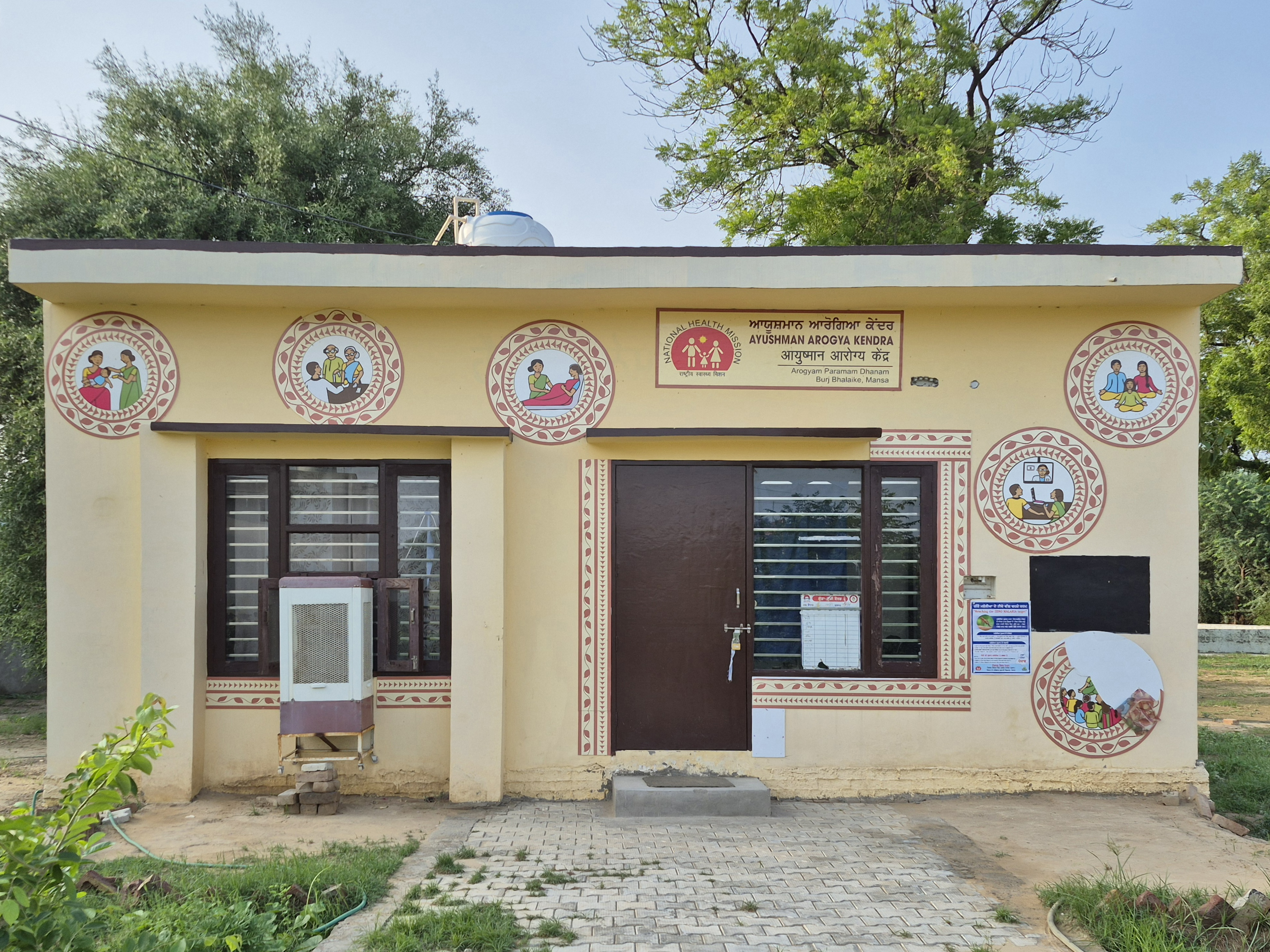
Ayushman Arogaya Kendra
