= Kamalu =

Kamalu كمالو
- Village
- Location within Iran
- Coordinates: 35°11′59″N 49°34′40″E
- Country: Iran
- Province: Markazi
- County: Saveh
- Bakhsh: Nowbaran
- Rural District: Kuhpayeh

Population (2006)
  - Total: 86
- Time zone: UTC+3:30 (IRST)
  - Summer (DST): UTC+4:30 (IRDT)

Kamalu (Persian: كمالو, also Romanized as Kamālū; also known as Kamāl Lū) is a village in Kuhpayeh Rural District, Nowbaran District, Saveh County, Markazi Province, Iran. At the 2006 census, its population was 86, in 34 families.
