= Ghuduwal =

Village in Jalandhar District, Punjab, India

- Village
- Country: India
- State: Punjab
- District: Jalandhar
- Tehsil: Shahkot

Government
  - Type: Panchayat raj
  - Body: Gram panchayat

Area
  - Total: 290 ha (720 acres)

Population (2011)
  - Total: 980; 501/479 ♂/♀
  - Scheduled Castes: 143; 77/66 ♂/♀
  - Total Households: 189

Languages
  - Official: Punjabi
- Time zone: UTC+5:30 (IST)
- ISO 3166 code: IN-PB
- Website: jalandhar.gov.in

Ghuduwal is a village in Shahkot in Jalandhar district of Punjab State, India. It is located 25 kilometres (16 mi) from sub-district headquarters and 55 kilometres (34 mi) from district headquarters. The village is administrated by Sarpanch an elected representative of the village.

== Demography ==
As of 2011, the village has a total number of 189 houses and a population of 980 of which 501 are males while 479 are females. According to the report published by Census India in 2011, out of the total population of the village, 143 people are from Schedule Caste and the village does not have any Schedule Tribe population.

== See also ==
- List of villages in India
