= Nangla, India =

Nangla
- Village
- Country: India
- State: Punjab
- District: Bathinda
- Talukas: Talwandi Sabo

Government
  - Type: Panchayati raj (India)
  - Body: Gram panchayat

Languages
  - Official: Punjabi
  - Regional: Punjabi
- Time zone: UTC+5:30 (IST)

Nangla is a village in Talwandi Sabo Tehsil of Bathinda District in Punjab. Nangla had a population of 2339 in 2001. Its area is 12.15 km^{2}.
