= Talwandi Aklia =

Talwandi Aklia Chhoti Talwandi
- Village
- Nickname: Talwandi
- Interactive map of Talwandi Aklia
- Country: India
- State: Punjab
- District: Mansa

Languages
  - Official: Punjabi
  - Regional: Punjabi
- Time zone: UTC+5:30 (IST)

Talwandi Aklia (also known as Chhoti Talwandi) is a small village in Mansa district of Punjab, India. In the February 2012 elections, it was among the villages where more than 90 per cent ballots were cast.
