= Chhapian Wali =

- Village
- Location in Punjab, India Chhapian Wali (India)
- Coordinates: 29.911°N 75.297°E
- Country: India
- State: Punjab
- District: Mansa

Languages
  - Official: Punjabi
  - Regional: Punjabi
- Time zone: UTC+5:30 (IST)
- Nearest city: Mansa

Chhapian Wali (also spelled as Chhapianwali or Chhapiyanwali) is a village in Mansa district of Punjab, India. In the February 2012 elections, it was among the villages with over 90 per cent of the voting.

== Geography ==
The village approximately centered at 29°54′40″N 75°17′49″E. Raipur, Raman Nandi, Baje Wala and Uddat Bhagat Ram are the surrounding villages.

== Education ==
The village has a government primary school and students have to go to the nearby villages or city for higher education.
