= Sardulgarh =

City in Punjab, India

- City
- Location in Punjab, India Sardulgarh (India)
- Coordinates: 29.697°N 75.238752°E
- Country: India
- State: Punjab
- District: Mansa

Area
  - Total: 40 km^{2} (15 sq mi)
- Elevation: 210 m (690 ft)

Population (2023)
  - Total: 40,000
  - Density: 1,000/km^{2} (2,600/sq mi)

Languages
  - Official: Punjabi, Hindi
- Time zone: UTC+5:30 (IST)
- Postal code: 151507

Sardulgarh is a City in Mansa district in the Indian state of Punjab. Surrounded by cities of Mansa city, Sirsa, Tohana, Bathinda, Fatehabad. It is a Sub-Division (Tehsil) of District Mansa. Its old name was Tadalan or Dhudalan/Dhudhal.

== Geography ==
Sardulgarh is located in the south region of Punjab State. The longitude and latitude at 29.697°N 75.238752°E. It has an average elevation of 210 metres (688 feet). It is a city located around the bank of River Ghagar. It is surrounded and touch the border of Haryana State from 3 sides. Its boundary touches to 3 districts (Bathinda, Sirsa and Fatehabad).

== Demographics ==
As of 2001 India census, Sardulgarh had a population of 16,315. Males constitute 54% of the population and females 46%. Sardulgarh has an average literacy rate of 65%, more than the national average of 59.5%: male literacy is 72%, and female literacy is 61%.
