= Sardulgarh tehsil =

Sardulgarh tehsil ਸਰਦੂਲਗੜ੍ਹ ਤਹਿਸੀਲ
- tehsil
- Country: India
- State: Punjab
- District: Mansa district

Languages
  - Official: Punjabi
  - Regional: Punjabi
- Time zone: UTC+5:30 (IST)
- Vehicle registration: PB51

Sardulgarh tehsil is one of the three tehsils (or taluk) of Mansa district of Punjab, India. The other two are Budhlada and Mansa. It borders with the state of Haryana in the south and the Barnala-Sirsa highway goes through the tehsil main city of Sardulgarh. The river, Ghaggar also flows through the tehsil. It has 78 villages falling under it with a development block of Jhunir.

== See also ==
- Budhlada
