= Mansa district, India =

District of Punjab in India

Mansa district
- Metropolis
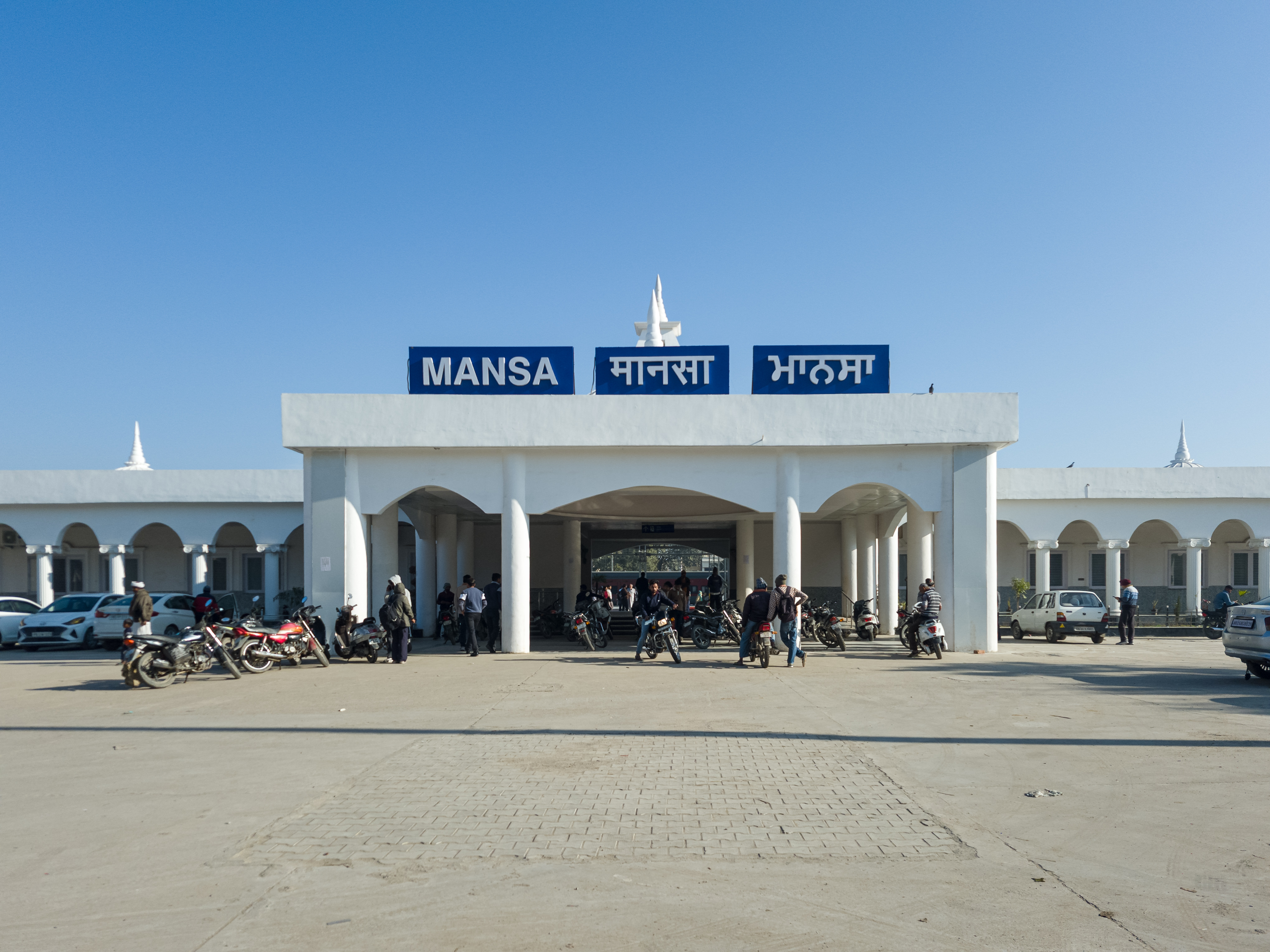
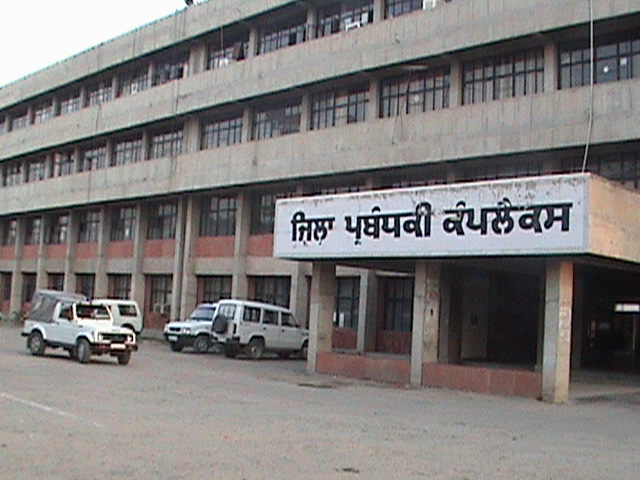
- Railway Station, Mansa District Administrative Complex, Mansa

- Location in Punjab
- Coordinates: 29°59′N 75°23′E
- Country: India
- State: Punjab
- Headquarters: Mansa

Area
  - Total: 2,174 km^{2} (839 sq mi)

Population (2011)
  - Total: 769,751
  - Density: 350/km^{2} (910/sq mi)

Languages
  - Official: Punjabi
  - Regional: Punjabi: (Malwai); (Puadhi)
- Time zone: UTC+5:30 (IST)
- ISO 3166 code: IN-PB
- Sex ratio: 1000/880 ♂/♀
- Literacy: 63%
- Website: www.mansa.nic.in

Mansa district is a district in the state of Punjab, India. Mansa is called the “Area of White Gold” because of its location in the cotton belt of Punjab. The district is located in the southernmost region of the state. It is home to the talwandi sabo power project and the Mansa Solar Power Plant.

Mansa has three tehsils: Mansa, Budhlada and Sardulgarh; and five development blocks: Mansa, Budhlada, Sardulgarh, Bhikhi and Jhunir. The district is part of the Faridkot division.

== History ==
Mansa District was formerly a part of the Phulkian Sikh Dynasty (1722–1948) and then part of the Kaithal Sikh Kingdom (1762–1857). The present district was formed on 13 April 1992 from the former Bathinda district.

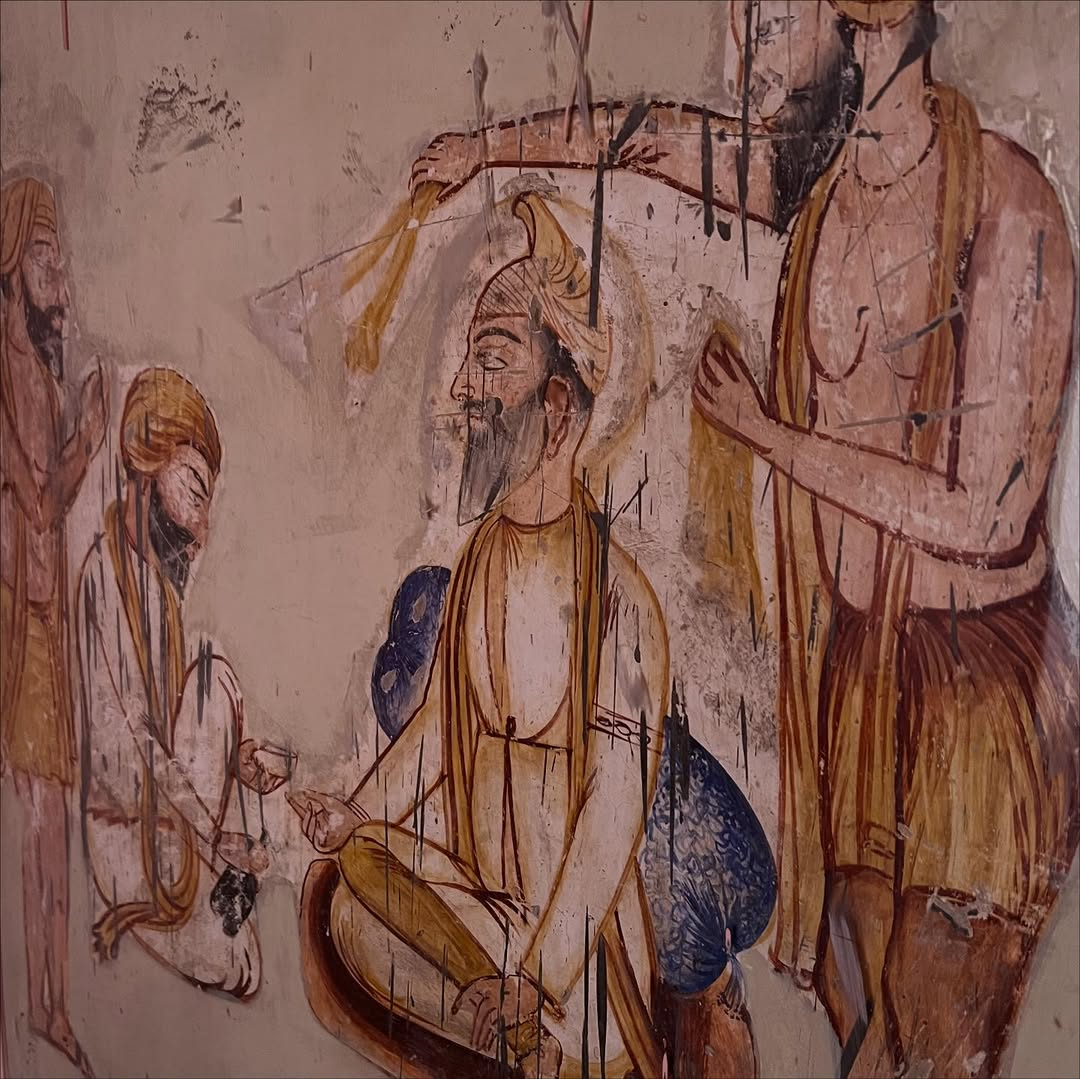
19th century mural depicting Baba Thaman Singh, from Bachhoana, Mansa district.

The ancient history of the Mansa district has been traced to the Indus Valley civilization. The archaeological finds at different villages of Mansa district are almost similar to those of Harappa and Mohenjo-Daro.

Mansa is traditionally believed to have been founded by Bhai Gurdas of Dhingar, who married into a local Dhaliwal Jat Sikh family. According to local tradition, when his in-laws refused to allow his wife to accompany him home, Bhai Gurdas sat in prolonged meditation outside their residence. While her family eventually relented, he declined to take her along with him, declaring that he had renounced worldly life. A samadhi (memorial shrine) was later constructed at the site in his honour. An annual fair is held at the shrine in March-April, attracting large numbers of devotees who offer laddus and gur (jaggery).

== Geography ==
The district is roughly triangular in shape and is bounded on the northwest by Bathinda district, on the northeast by Sangrur district, and on the south by Haryana state. It is situated on the Bathinda-Jind-Delhi railway and the Barnala-Sardulgarh-Sirsa National Highway 703 (NH 703) and National highway 148B (NH 148B). The district is divided into three tehsils, Budhlada, Mansa, and Sardulgarh. The Ghaggar River flows through the Sardulgarh Tehsil in the southwestern corner of the district.

== Administration ==
=== Subdistricts of Mansa district ===
According to the Indian government's integrated online directory, Mansa district is divided into the following subdistricts (tehsils/subdivisions) and blocks:

- Subdistricts
  1. Budhlada
  2. Mansa
  3. Sardulgarh
- Blocks:
  1. Bhikhi
  2. Budhlada
  3. Jhunir
  4. Mansa
  5. Sardulgarh

== Demographics ==
Historical population
Year	Pop.	±% p.a.
1951	241,932	—
1961	319,389	+2.82%
1971	402,099	+2.33%
1981	486,842	+1.93%
1991	574,662	+1.67%
2001	688,758	+1.83%
2011	2,423,655	+13.41%

According to the 2011 Census of India, Mansa district recorded a total population of 2,423,655, which placed it at the rank 489 among the 640 districts in the country. The population density of the district was 352 persons per square km (910 per square mile).

Within the state of Punjab, this density was the second lowest among all districts. During the period from 2001 to 2011, the district experienced a population growth rate of 11.62 percent. The sex ratio in Mansa district was 880 females per 1,000 males. The literacy rate in the district was recorded at 90 percent.

== Gender ==
The data on the sex ratio of Mansa district across successive census years provides a record of the number of females per 1,000 males over time. In 1951, the sex ratio was recorded at 824, which increased to 830 in 1961. By 1971, the ratio rose further to 852, followed by 869 in 1981 and 873 in 1991. The upward trend continued with a recorded ratio of 879 in 2001, reaching 883 in 2011. These figures indicate the measured changes in the sex ratio of the district over the decades based on census data. The table below shows the sex ratio of Mansa district through the decades.

The data on the child sex ratio in Mansa district, defined as the number of females per 1,000 males among children below six years of age, is presented for both urban and rural areas across two census years. In 2001, the child sex ratio was recorded at 778 in urban areas and 783 in rural areas. In 2011, the corresponding figures were 849 for urban areas and 840 for rural areas. These figures represent the recorded values for the child population in each category, indicating the distribution of females relative to males among children below the age of six in both rural and urban areas of the district for the years specified. The table below shows the child sex ratio of children below the age of 6 years in the rural and urban areas of Mansa district.

=== Religions ===
Religion in Mansa district (2011)
Religion	Percent
Sikhism	77.75%
Hinduism	20.34%
Islam	1.35%
Other or not stated	0.57%

The data on the population of different religious groups in Mansa district presents the recorded number of individuals in urban and rural areas for the census years 2001 and 2011. In 2011, the Hindu population was 89,262 in urban areas and 67,277 in rural areas, while the Sikh population was 70,261 in urban areas and 528,182 in rural areas.

The Muslim population was recorded at 2,145 in urban areas and 8,230 in rural areas, and the Christian population at 171 in urban areas and 746 in rural areas. Individuals classified under other religions numbered 1,765 in urban areas and 1,722 in rural areas. In 2001, the Hindu population was 80,272 in urban areas and 58,953 in rural areas, while the Sikh population was 58,868 in urban areas and 480,646 in rural areas. The Muslim population was recorded at 1,370 in urban areas and 5,701 in rural areas, and the Christian population at 71 in urban areas and 327 in rural areas. The population belonging to other religions was 1,848 in urban areas and 702 in rural areas. These figures represent the recorded distribution of religious groups in both urban and rural areas of the district for the years specified.

The table below shows the population of different religions in absolute numbers in the urban and rural areas of Mansa district.

Absolute numbers of different religious groups in Mansa district
Religion	Urban (2011)	Rural (2011)	Urban (2001)	Rural (2001)
Hindu	89,262	67,277	80,272	58,953
Sikh	70,261	5,28,182	58,868	4,80,646
Muslim	2,145	8,230	1,370	5,701
Christian	171	746	71	327
Other religions	1,765	1,722	1,848	702

=== Languages ===
Languages of Mansa district (2011)
1. Punjabi (98.9%)
2. Hindi (1.00%)
3. Others (0.10%)

At the time of the 2011 Census of India, the linguistic composition of Mansa district was recorded in terms of mother tongue. According to the data, 98.9 percent of the population reported Punjabi as their first language, while 1 percent reported Hindi as their mother tongue.

== Health ==
In the year 2017, Mansa district had the second highest number of malaria cases in Punjab at 152.

The table below shows the data from the district nutrition profile of children below the age of 5 years in Mansa, as of 2020.

District nutrition profile of children under 5 years of age in Mansa, year 2020
Indicators	Number of children (<5 years)	Percent (2020)	Percent (2016)
Stunted	21,477	37%	30%
Wasted	7,091	12%	16%
Severely wasted	1,988	3%	7%
Underweight	13,296	23%	25%
Overweight/obesity	1,812	3%	1%
Anemia	41,220	78%	52%
Total children	58,648		

The table below shows the district nutrition profile of Mansa of women between the ages of 15 and 49 years, as of year 2020.

District nutritional profile of Mansa of women of 15-49 years, in 2020
Indicators	Number of women (15-49 years)	Percent (2020)	Percent (2016)
Underweight (BMI <18.5 kg/m^2)	38,200	16%	19%
Overweight/obesity	78,205	33%	24%
Hypertension	71,744	30%	20%
Diabetes	27,628	12%	NA
Anemia (non-preg)	143,012	60%	50%
Anemia (preg)	7,540	68%	38%
Total women (preg)	11,052		
Total women	237,562		

The table below shows the number of road accidents and people affected in Mansa district by year.

Road accidents and people affected in Mansa district by year
Year	Accidents	Killed	Injured	Vehicles Involved
2022	115	78	76	115
2021	159	127	70	224
2020	170	111	132	273
2019	163	115	88	130

== Agriculture and industry ==
Mansa district is located in the cotton-growing belt of Punjab, and agriculture is a main component of its economy. The district also contains a thermal power plant with an installed capacity of 1,980 megawatts, contributing to electricity generation in the state. Industrial development in the district is limited, with some trade and small-scale industrial activity in urban areas. In 2010–11, there were 1,974 registered Micro and Small Enterprise (MSE) units in Mansa district, providing employment to 7,276 persons.

== Major cities and towns ==
=== Village Ubha ===
Ubha is situated in Mansa District. It is famous for its temple, Jai Durga Maa Maisar Mandir.

=== Bareta ===
Bareta is situated on the Bathinda–Delhi railway line.

=== Budhlada or Badlada ===
Badlada was named after Budha Singh Badholada, who was a khatri Sikh by caste. It is also situated on the Bathinda-Delhi railway line. It was the largest market of Eastern Punjab and a very big recruitment centre for military personnel.

== Politics ==
No.	Constituency	Name of MLA	Party	Bench
96	Mansa	Vijay Singla	Aam Aadmi Party	Government
97	Sardulgarh	Gurpreet Singh Banawali	Aam Aadmi Party	Government
98	Budhlada (SC)	Budhram Singh	Aam Aadmi Party	Government

== Notable people ==
- Ajit Inder Singh, Indian politician
- Ajmer Singh Aulakh, Indian author, Sahitya Akademi Award winner for Best Drama Director, hails from Pharwahi
- Aman Dhaliwal, Indian model and actor
- Bant Singh, agricultural labour activist
- Anmol gagan maan [ Indian politician, Indian singer] hails from Khilan
- Balwinder Singh Bhunder, Indian politician
- Deep Dhillon, Indian actor
- Dilraj Singh Bhunder, Indian politician
- Gavie Chahal, Indian actor, hails from the village of Sher Khan Wala
- Gurpreet Singh Banawali, Indian politician
- Harmanjeet Singh, Indian poet and lyricist
- Korala maan [Indian Singer] hails from korala
- Kulwinder Billa, Indian singer, hails from the village of Dhaipi
- Labh Heera [Indian singer] hails from Achanak
- Nand Singh, Indian army soldier
- Nisha Bano, Indian actress and singer
- Nirmal Rishi, Indian actress of film and television
- Dhaipi, Indian archer hails from Mandhali
- Preet Sanghreri, Indian artist, lyricist and singer
- R nait [ Indian singer] hails from Dharampura
- Sawarn Singh, Indian Olympic rower
- Sidhu Moose Wala, Indian singer and politician; from the village of Moosa, his namesake
- Shipra Goyal, Indian singer
- Sukhmeet Singh, Indian rower
- Sukhwinder Singh Aulakh, Indian politician
- Veena Verma (writer), short-story writer
- Vijay Singla, Indian politician

== Gallery ==
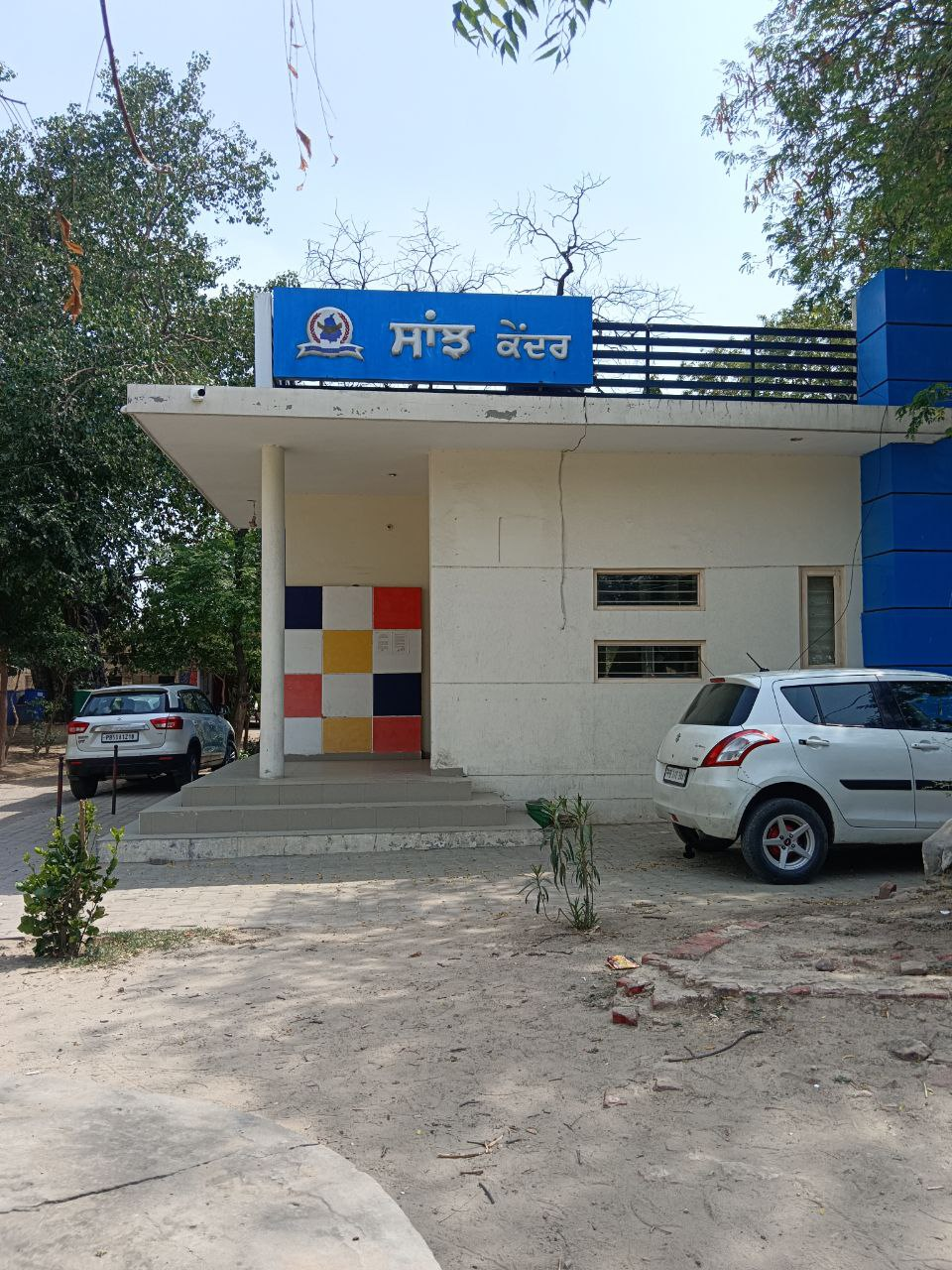
Suvidha center in Bhikhi, Mansa

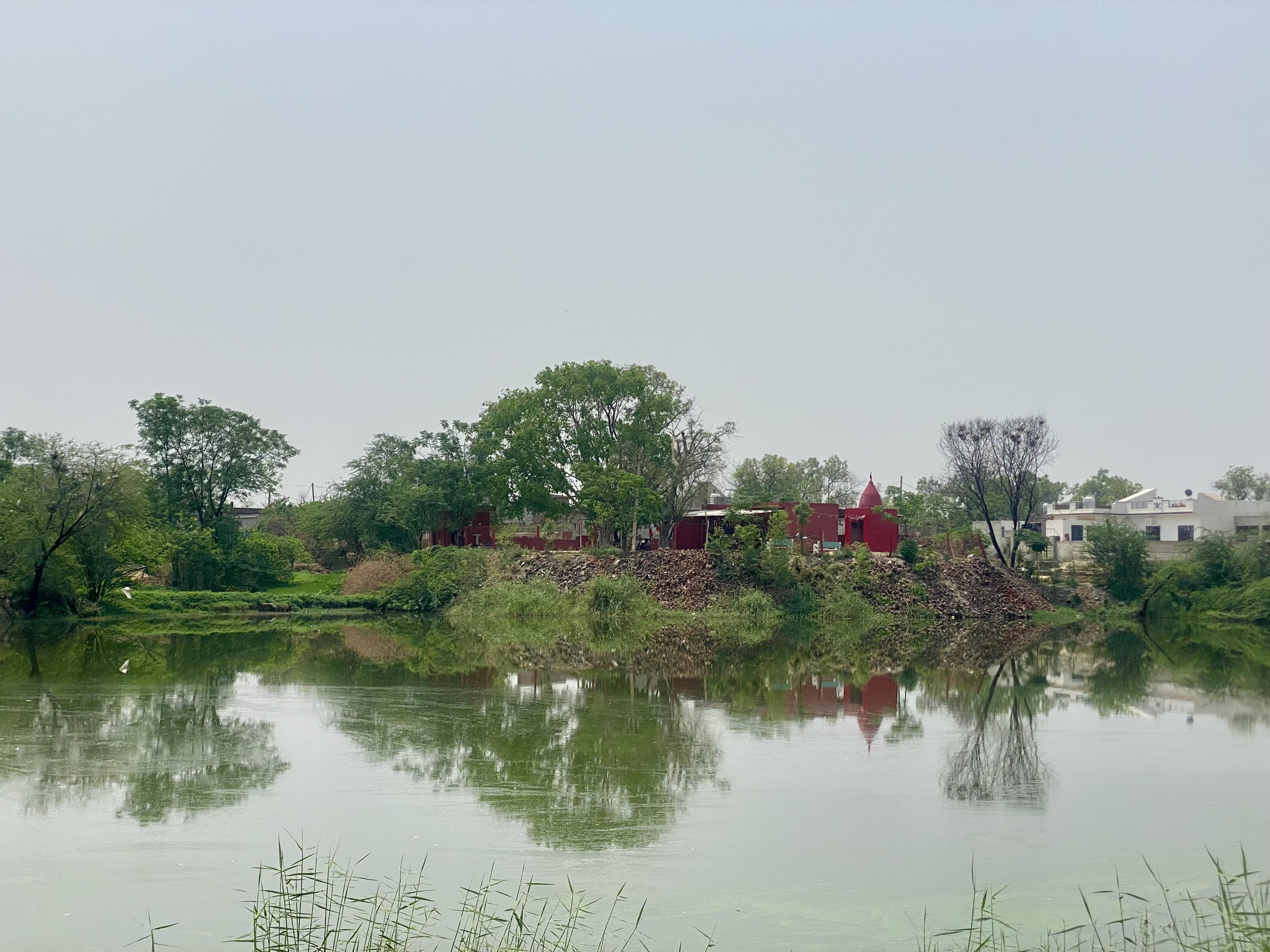
Village Saharna in Mansa District

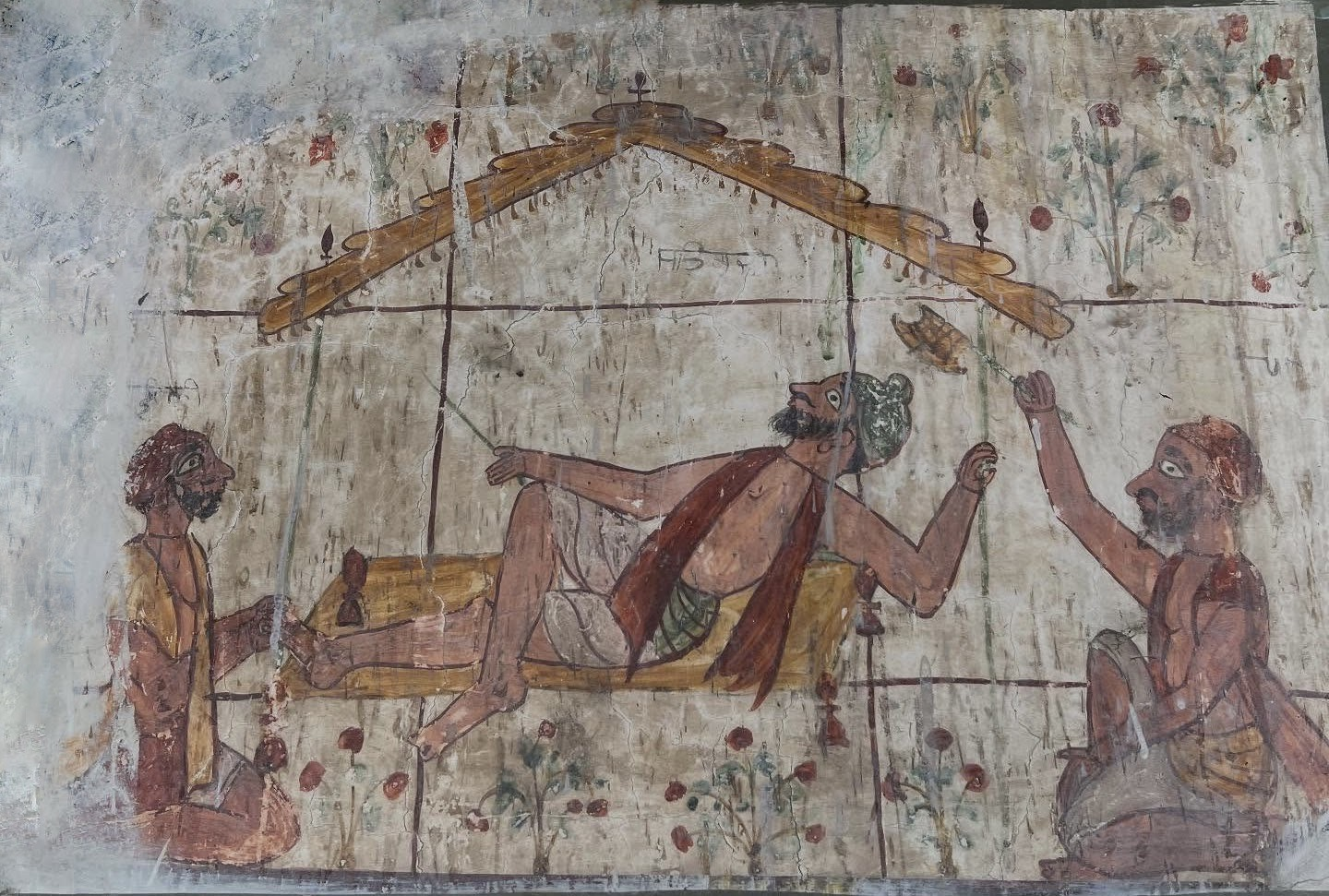
19th-Century Mural from Dera Baba Thaman Singh, Bachhoana, Mansa district.

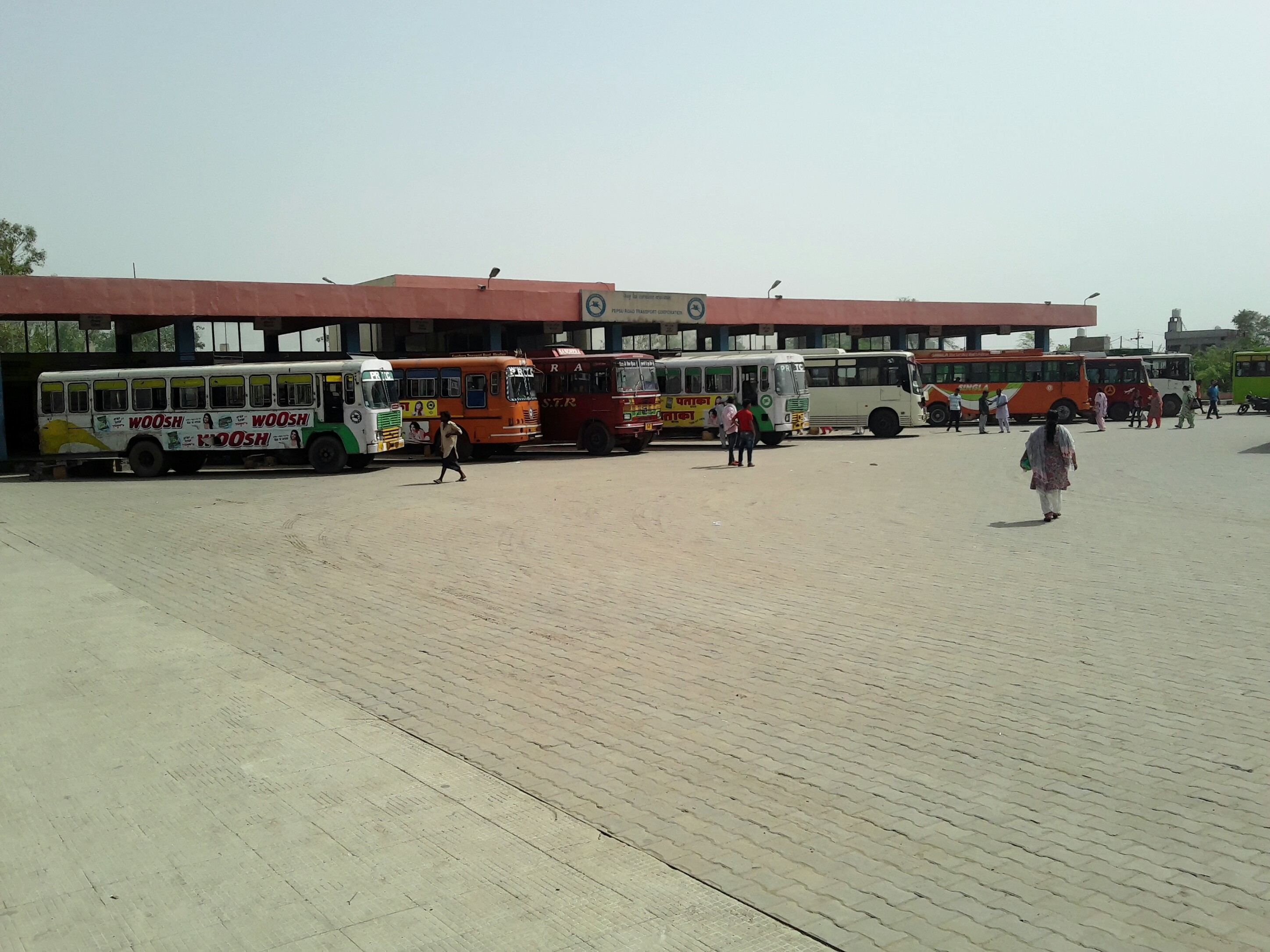
PRTC Bus Station at Budhlada, Mansa.

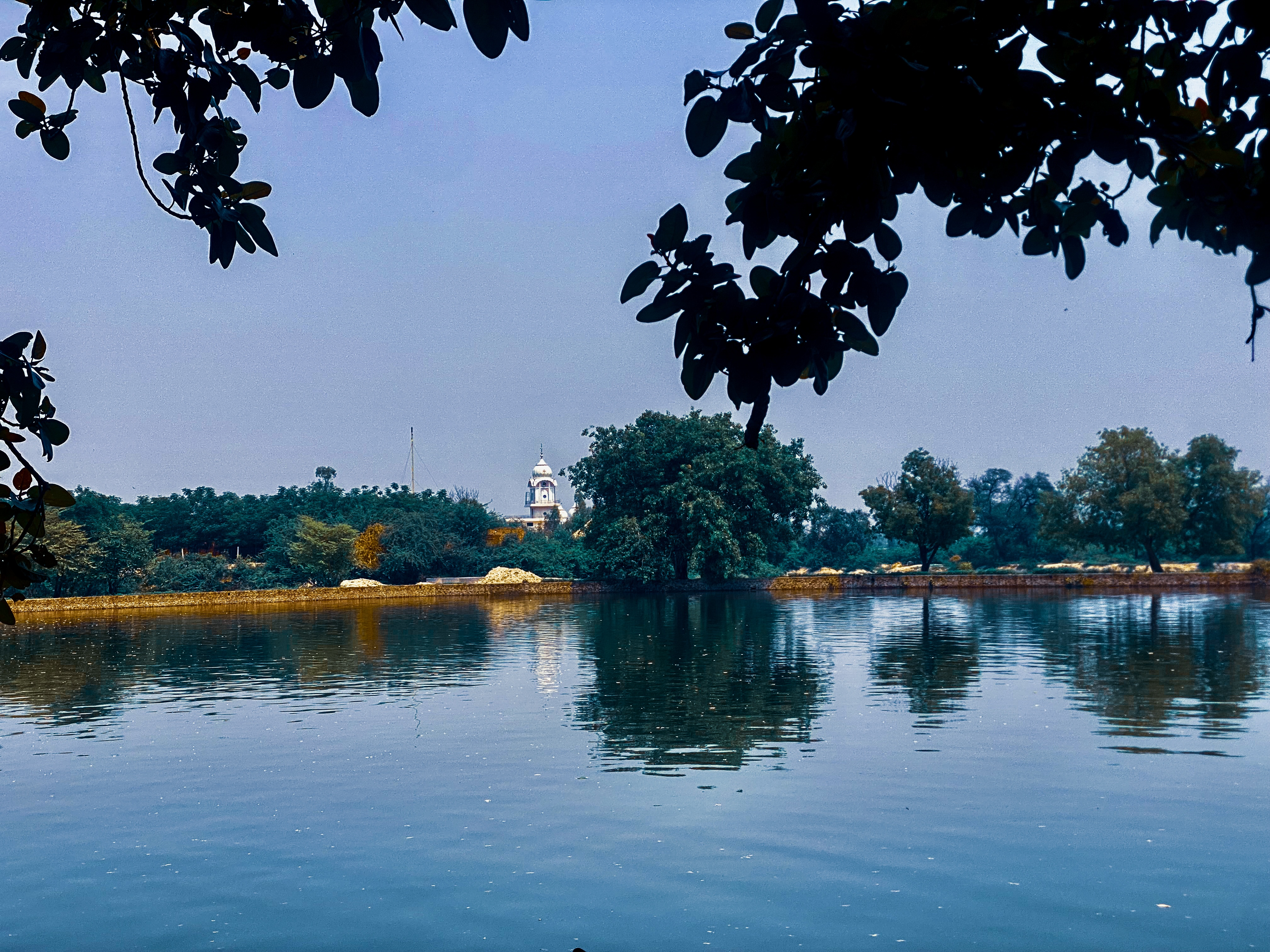
Village Mandali, Mansa District.

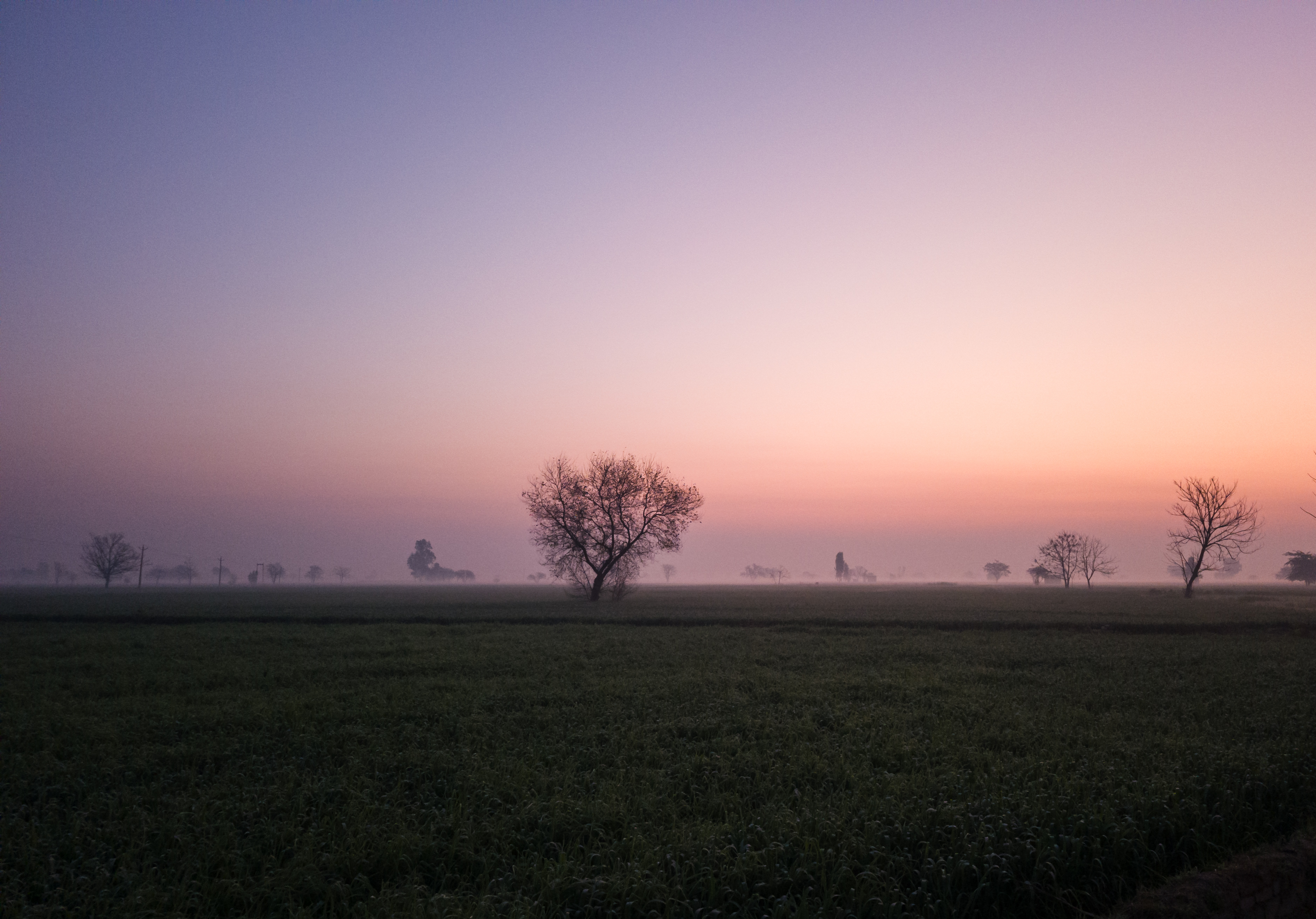
Sunrise view in Burj Bhalaike, Mansa District.

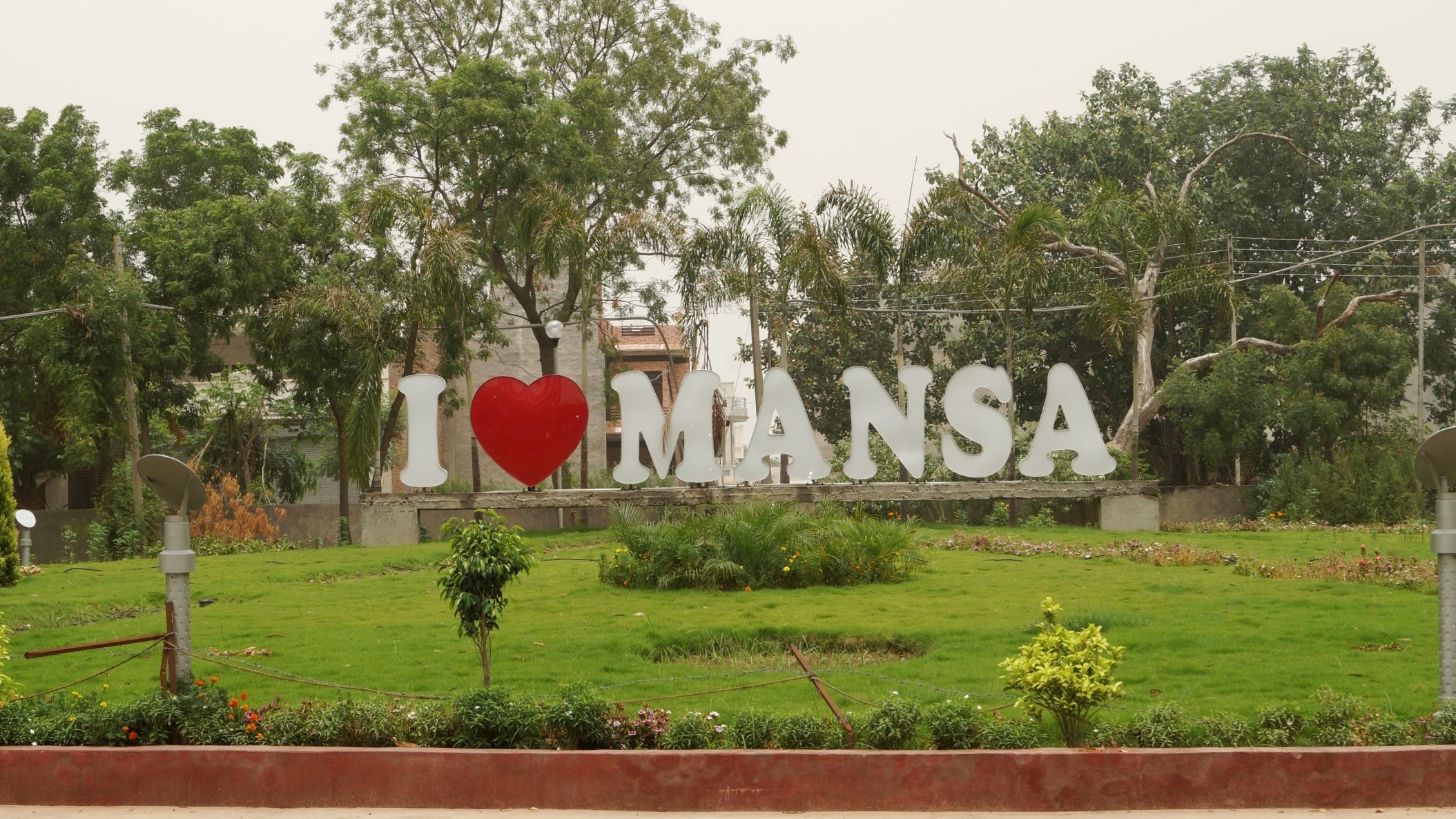
The Central Park, City Mansa.

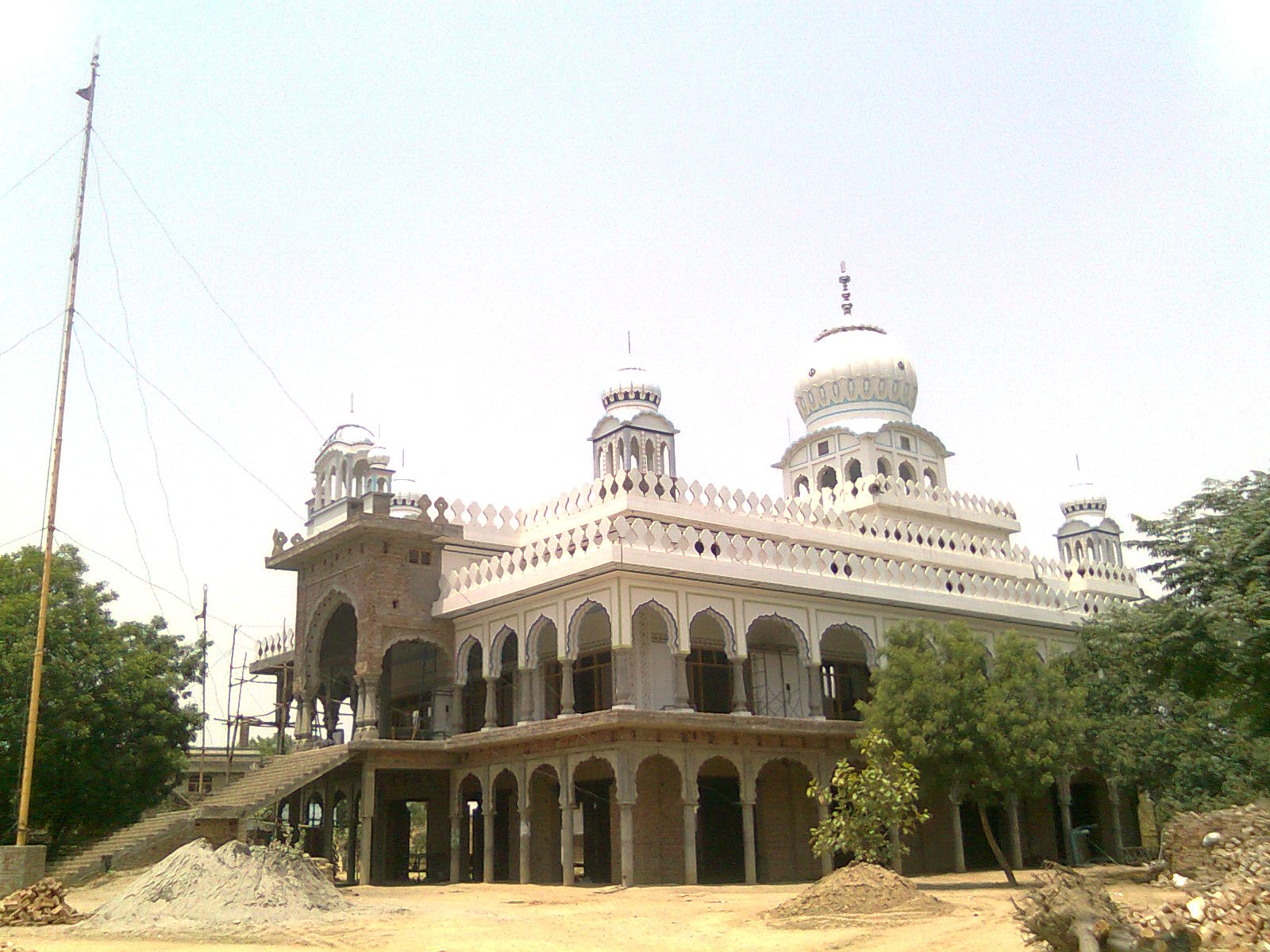
Gurudwara Sahib, Raipur, Mansa.

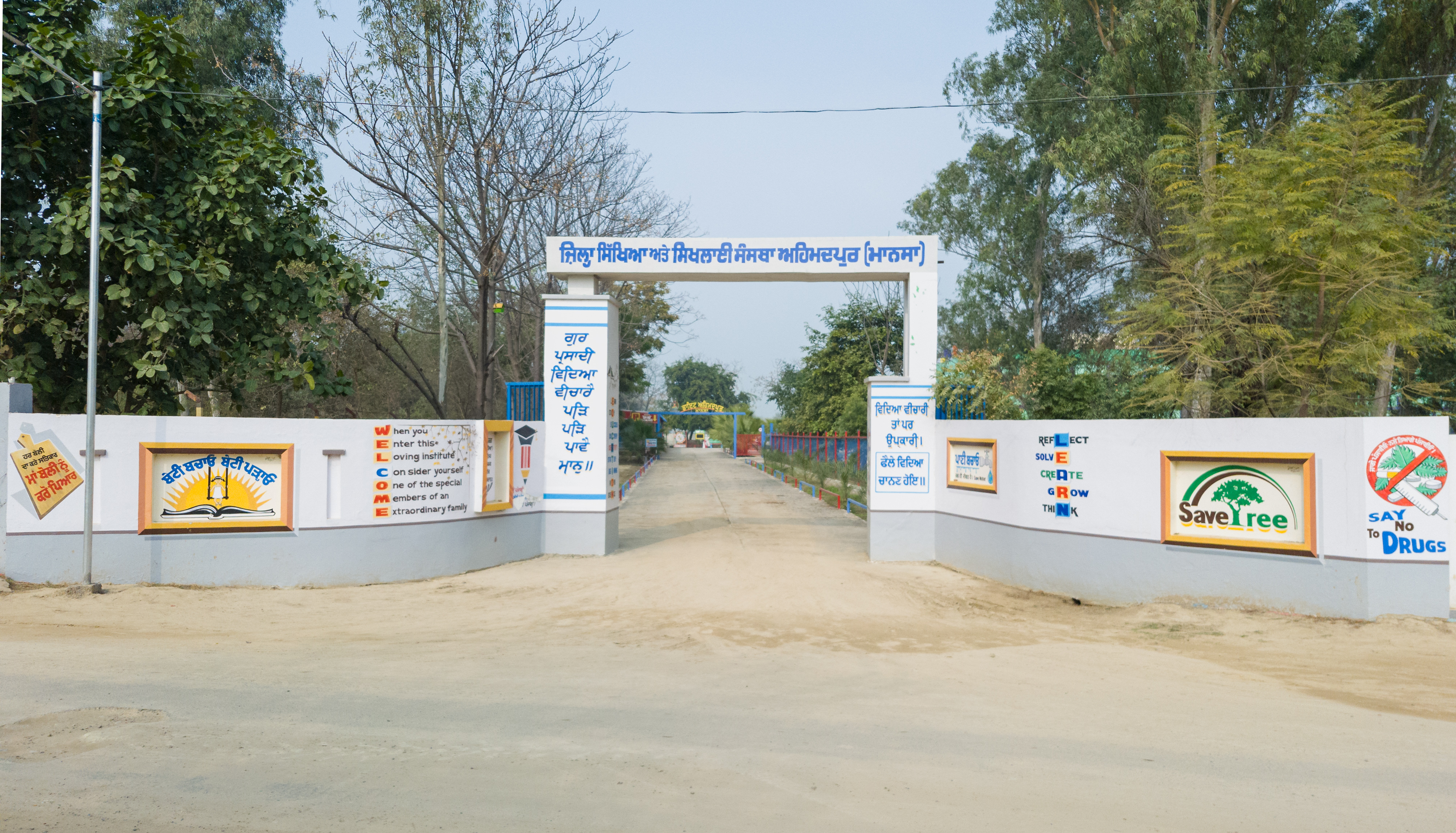
DIET, Ahmedpur, Mansa District.

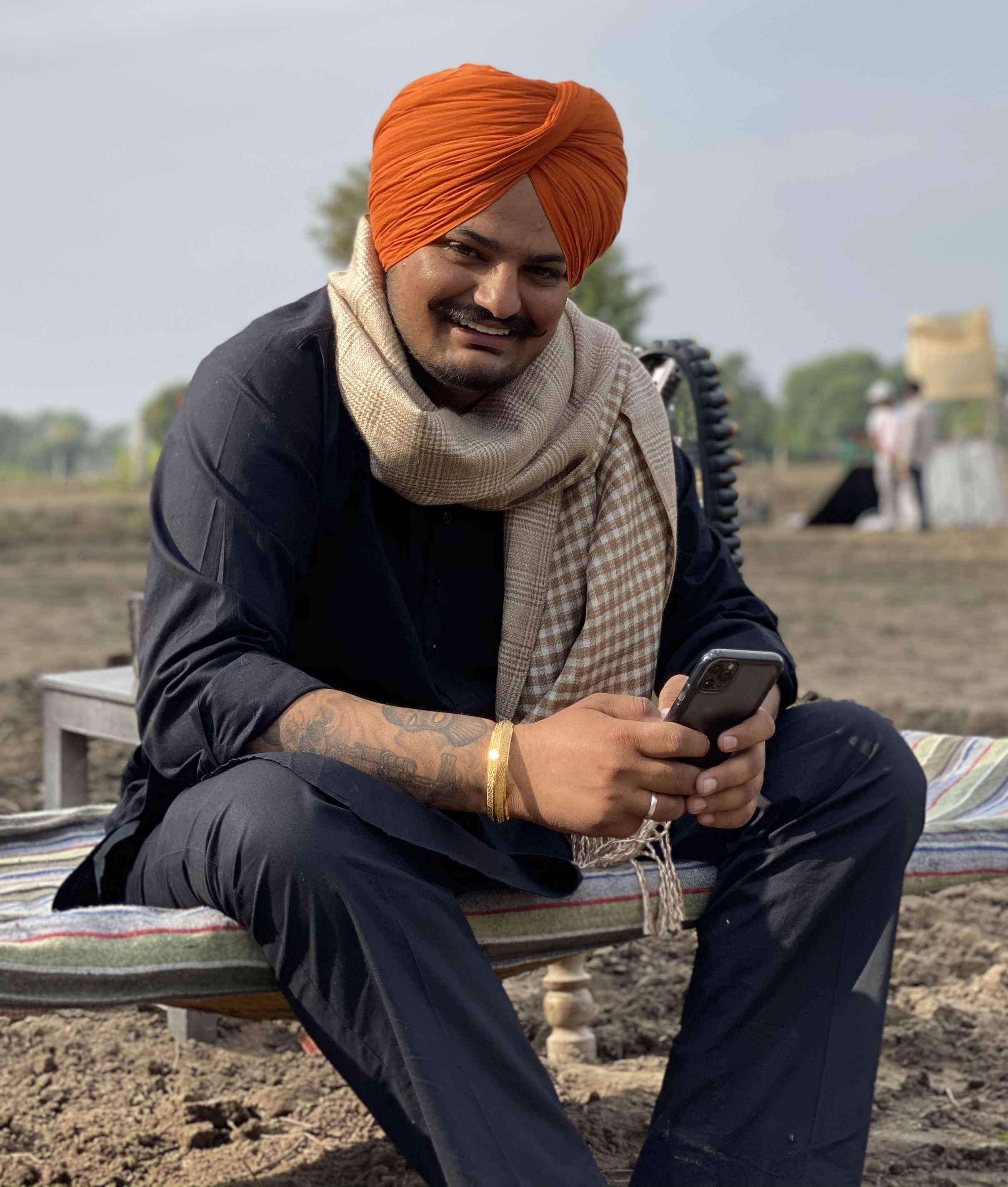
Sidhu Moose Wala, A Punjabi Singer from Mansa District.
