= Dadhi =

- Village
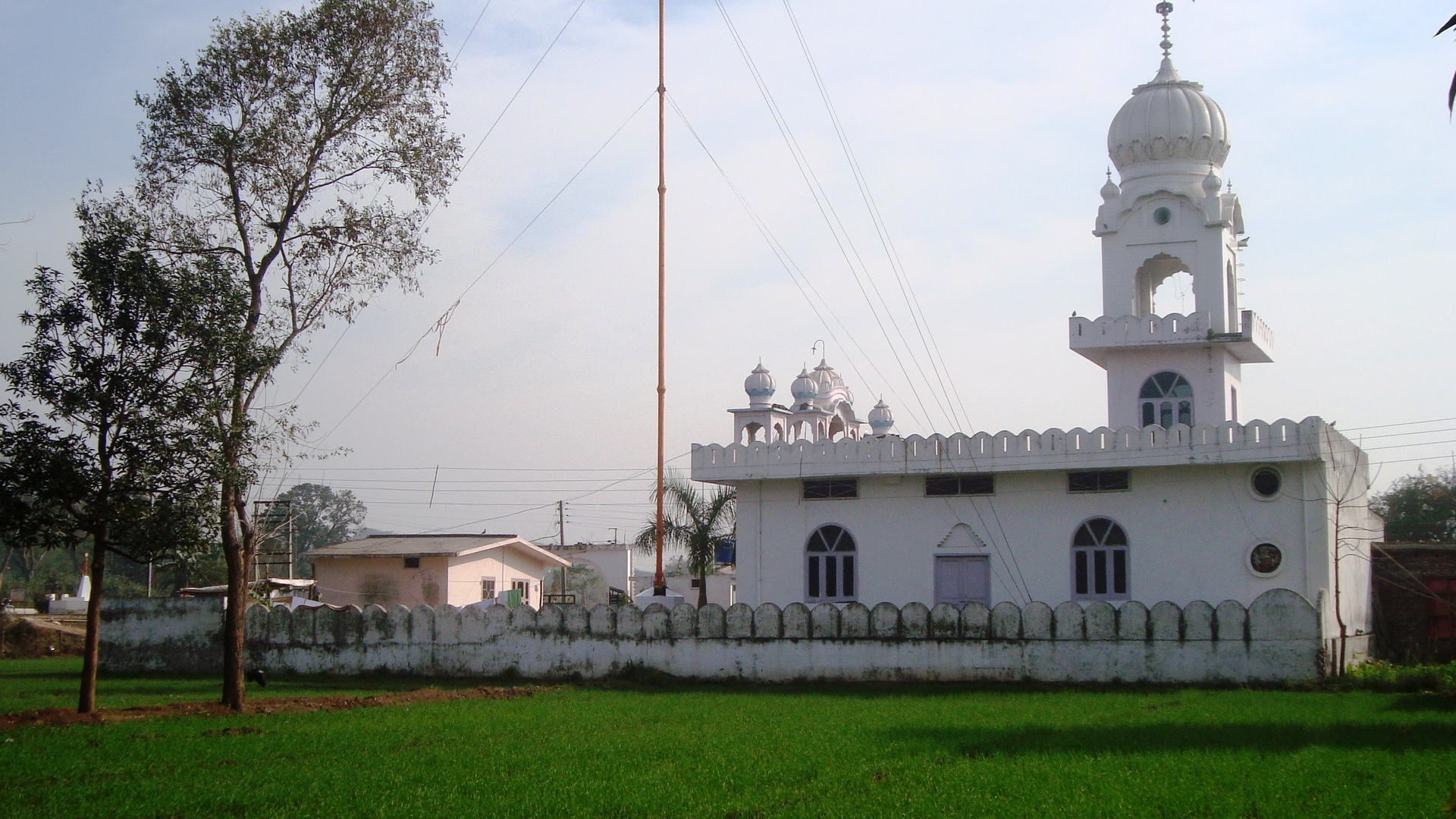
- Gurudwara Shri Hargobindsar Sahib, Punjab, India

- Location in Punjab, India Dadhi (India)
- Coordinates: 31.168215°N 76.571091°E
- Country: India
- State: Punjab
- District: Rupnagar

Government
  - Type: Panchayat

Area
  - Total: 5 km^{2} (1.9 sq mi)

Languages
  - Official: Punjabi, Hindi
- Time zone: UTC+5:30 (IST)
- Vehicle registration: PB 12-16
- Nearest city: Rupnagar city
- Sex ratio: 980/1000 ♂/♀
- Literacy: 90%%
- Vidhan Sabha constituency: Anandpur Sahib
- Climate: Pleasant, moderate, cool (Köppen)

Dadhi is a small village in Rupnagar district, Punjab, India, near the towns of Rupnagar city, Kiratpur Sahib and Anandpur Sahib. The village is situated on the bank of the Sutlej River about 10 km (6.2 mi) south of Anandpur, 30 km (19 mi) north of Rupnagar and 90 km (56 mi) from Chandigarh on the Nangal-Rupnagar-Chandigarh road (National Highway 21).

Kiratpur Sahib was established in 1627, by the 6th Nanak, Guru Hargobind, who bought the land from Raja Tara Chand of Kehloor through his son, Baba Gurditta. Guru Nanak Dev is said to have visited this place when it was little more than a wilderness. Guru Hargobind spent the last few years of his life here. Both Guru Har Rai and Guru Harkrishan were also born and received the Gurgadi (Guruship) here. It is a sacred place for the Sikhs.

The village is also associated with the memory of a Muslim saint, Pir Buddan Shah who, according to legends, lived about 800 years.

Guru Ramana Maharshi Gramin Vikas Sanstha, a non-government organisation, has been working for the welfare of local people and to improve the village.

== Notable people ==
- Dr. Rattan Chand, a bureaucrat in the Government of India, hails from the village. He has worked with many international organisations as USAID, International Monetary Fund (IMF), UNICEF, WHO etc.
