= Taoni =

Rajput ethnic group

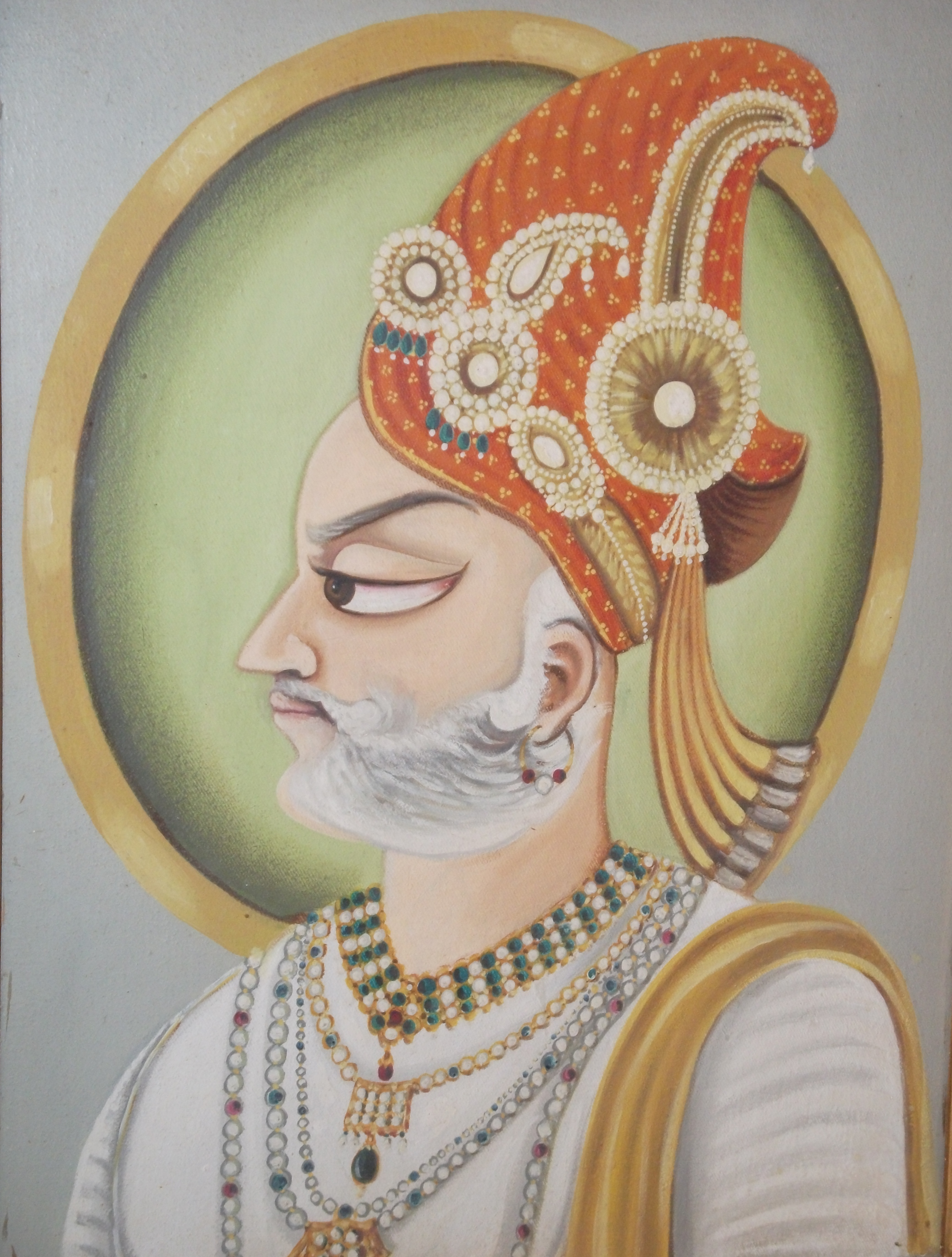
Maharawal Jaisal Singh, is one of the notable ancestors of Taoni Bhati Rajputs तौनी भाटी राजपूत

The Taoni is a Rajput ethnic group who, dominated a region in Ambala district then a part of the Punjab until the period of the British India. They are an offshoot of Bhati Rajputs of the Kingdom of Jaisalmer. The Taoni (Bhatis) also ruled over Punjab Hills being rulers of the Sirmur State from 13th century to 1948. In 1904, in areas surrounding Rajpura and Patiala, the Taons or Taoni were recorded as having 14 Chhats and 24 makans, the chhats (crowns) – being Banur, Shamdo, Kauli, Ghanaur, Patton, Khera Gujju, Suhron, Ajrawar, Chamaru, Manakpur, Jausla, Kharar, Khanpur and Morinda. The Hindu Taonis hold Bular, Ldru, Nagla and Khelan in tehsil Banur, and Dhakansu, Tepla, Banwari, Pabra and Dhamoli in Rajpura, whereas the Muslim Taonis had migrated to Pakistan in 1947.

According to the tradition of the tribe, their eponymous ancestor Raja Tan (aka. Rai Tan) was a grandson of Rawal Shalivahan Singh II, the King of Jaisalmer (1168–1200). The said Raja Tan left Jaisalmer and came to Jalandhar, Punjab. Later, his descendant Raja Amba founded the city of Ambala in the 14th century and made it the capital of his kingdom.

== See also ==
- List of Rajputs
