= Kartarpur =

Kartarpur may refer to:

- Kartarpur, India, a town in Jalandhar district, Punjab, India
  - Kartarpur Assembly Constituency, Punjab, India
  - Kartarpur railway station, Punjab, India
  - Battle of Kartarpur, a 1635 siege of Kartarpur, India by the Mughal Empire
- Kartarpur, Rupnagar, a village in Rupnagar district, Punjab, India
- Kartarpur, Pakistan, a village in Narowal District, Punjab, Pakistan
  - Gurdwara Darbar Sahib Kartarpur, site of the first Sikh commune and place of death of Guru Nanak, the founder of Sikhism
    - Kartarpur Corridor, an Indo-Pakistani border gate for Indian pilgrims between the gurdwara and Dera Baba Nanak, Punjab, India
