= Kajauli Waterworks =

Kajauli Waterworks is water supply department of Punjab located on the Bhakra mainline canal near Morinda in Ropar. It completes the water requirement of Chandigarh, Mohali and Chandimandir.

In 1983 agreement of water distribution from Bhakra through Kajauli, it was signed that it will be supplied to Mohali, Chandigarh, Chandimandir and Panchkula. The Kajauli waterworks was to have various phases. Four phases has been completed, from which 20 MGD(Millions of gallons per day) of water is available from each phase. The water from Kajauli reaches to treatment plant of Chandigarh in 39 Sector and it fed 5 other waterworks of the city includes Sector 52, 37,32,26 and 12. From Single phase, Chandigarh is receiving 14.5 Million Gallon, Mohali 2.5 MGD, Chandimandir 1.5 MGD and Panchkula 1.5 MGD.
