= Ghanauli =

- Town
- Location in Punjab, India Ghanauli (India)
- Coordinates: 31.025306°N 76.589634°E
- Country: India
- State: Punjab
- District: Rupnagar

Government
  - Type: Local Government
  - Body: State Government of Punjab, Government of India
- Elevation: 277 m (909 ft)

Population (2011)
  - Total: 4,894

Languages
  - Principal: Punjabi, Hindi
- Time zone: UTC+5:30 (IST)
- PIN: 140113
- Telephone code: 01881
- Vehicle registration: PB- 12

Ghanauli Town is situated near Rupnagar in Rupnagar district in the state of Punjab in India.

== Location ==
Ghanauli lies on the bank of river Sutlej near Rupnagar. The village is located on National Highway 205 (Earlier NH 21) section between Rupnagar and Kiratpur Sahib in Punjab, on the border of the Rupnagar district and Solan district.

Rupnagar, Baddi, Kurali, Kiratpur Sahib are the nearby cities. Himachal Pradesh state line is only 4.5 kilometers from Ghanauli.
