= Nehon =

Nuhon
- Census town
- Location in Punjab, India Nuhon (India)
- Coordinates: 31.0392°N 76.576°E
- Country: India
- State: Punjab
- District: Rupnagar

Population (2001)
  - Total: 10,158

Languages
  - Official: Punjabi
- Time zone: UTC+5:30 (IST)
- Postal code: 140113

Nuhon is a census town in Rupnagar district in the Indian state of Punjab.

== Demographics ==
As of 2001 India census, Nuhon had a population of 10,158. Males constitute 56% of the population and females 44%. Nuhon has an average literacy rate of 79%, higher than the national average of 59.5%: male literacy is 83%, and female literacy is 73%. In Nuhon, 11% of the population is under 6 years of age.
