= Sarthali =

Village in Punjab, India

Coordinates: 31°6′47.48″N 76°31′44.92″E

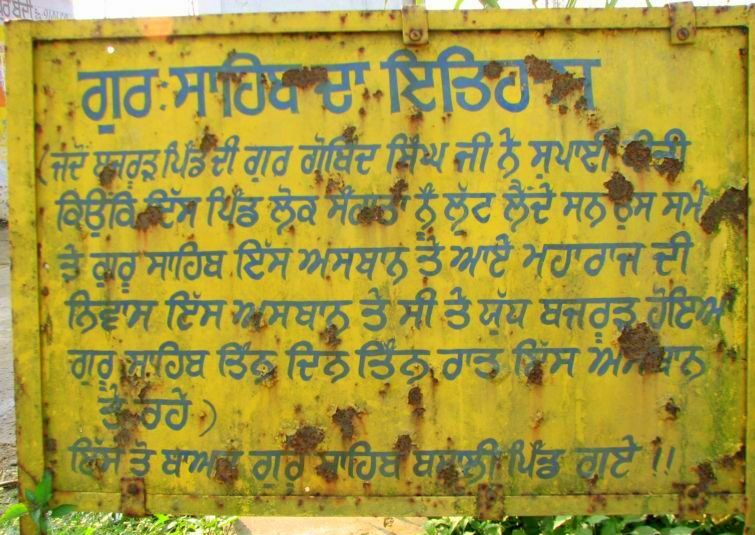
History board on main road about Gurudwara Rantham Sahib.

Sarthali is a village in Rupnagar District in the Indian state of Punjab. It is under the Lok Sabha constituency of Anandpur Sahib, as well as under the Vidhan sabha constituency of Ropar. It is located on Nurpur Bedi- Ropar road. It has a population of approximately 3000.

== History ==
Sarthali is an old village, referenced in Bhai Kahan Singh Nabha's Mahaan Kosh. Guru Gobind Singh came there after winning the battle of Bajrur with the Mughals. This battles has also been described in Shri Gur Patap Suraj Granth of Bhai Santokh Singh Choorhamani. The folklore reference according to elders about its nomenclature is that the villagers fought with bravery with foreign invaders, so that the name of the village became a combination of Sir (head) and Tali (palm) which means that these people are fought by taking their head on their palm. By the passing of time it became Sarthali from Sirtali.

== Infrastructure ==
- The village hosts a Primary Health Centre which covers the village Sarthali including some other surrounding villages.
- A Cooperative society is to serve the farmers on sharing based agricultural equipment and also provide fertilisers.
- A milk union to collect milk for Verka milk plant Mohali and to provide feed and other supplements for cattles.
- Two gymnasiums for physical workout and exercise.
- A potable drinking water supply system has been installed to provide 70 litre per capita per day potable water in the village.
- A community centre for common functions.
- An Govt. Elementary School to provide free education to students up to 8th class, this school is affiliated to Punjab School Education Board, Mohali.
- Approximate 1300 voters are there in the village.
- Shaheed Bhagat Singh Youth Welfare Sports Club Sarthali (Registered under Societies act of 1861) is serving with its social, cultural and sports activities.
- Kaali and Sukhjeet library, dedicated to two famous Punjabi writers respectively Des Raj Kaali (Jalandhar) and Swami Sukhjeet (Machhiwara), has been set up and operated by a teacher named Sunil Banga. This is a personal library but offers books to keen readers.

== Sacred Places ==
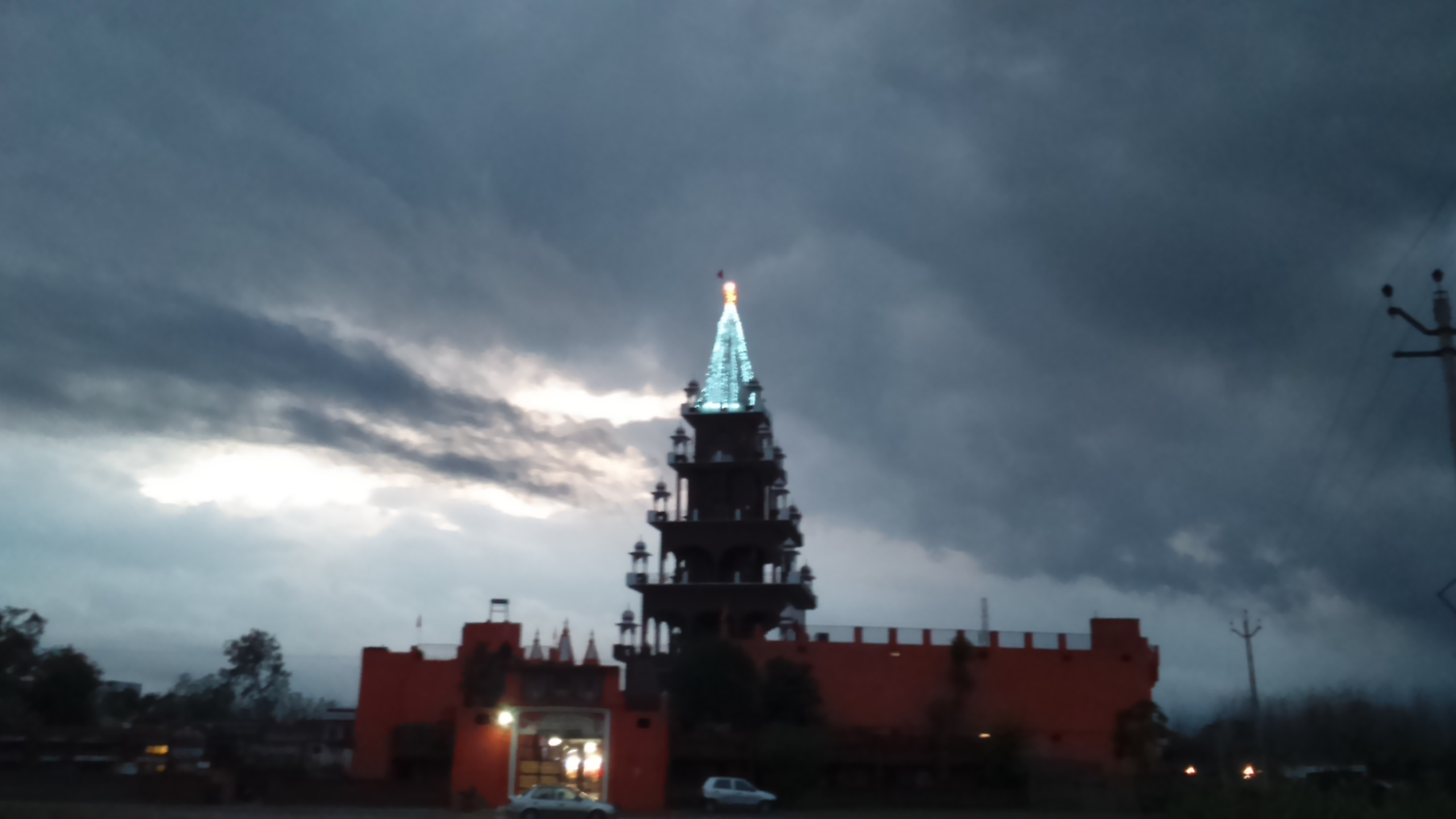
Shiv Mandir Sarthali

The village supports religious places of Hindus, Sikhs, Muslims and other sects.

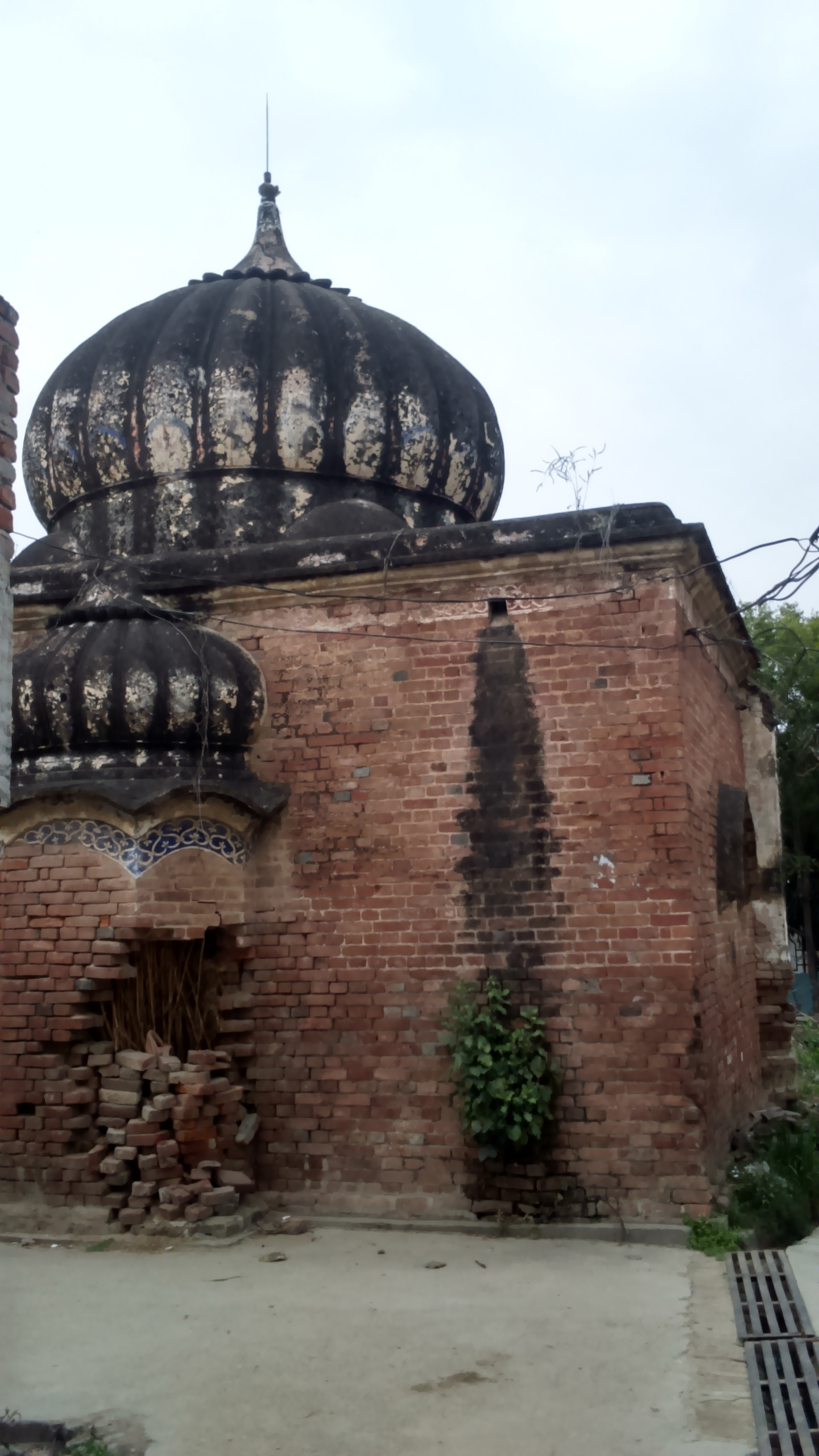
Back View of Mosque.

1. Sarthaleshwar Mahadev Mandir rises approximately 100 feet above the village. It was built for the worship of Shiva. Shivratri mela is a two-day celebration in February–March. On the first day marriages of low income girls are organised. On the second day religious songs are performed by Punjabi singers. The Sant Samelan (convention) cum Jagran and Janamashtmi has equal celebrations. Free glasses, medical checkups and surgical camps are provided. Blood donation camps and others social activities are done by devotees.
2. Mahaveer Mandir is dedicated to Lord Hanuman.
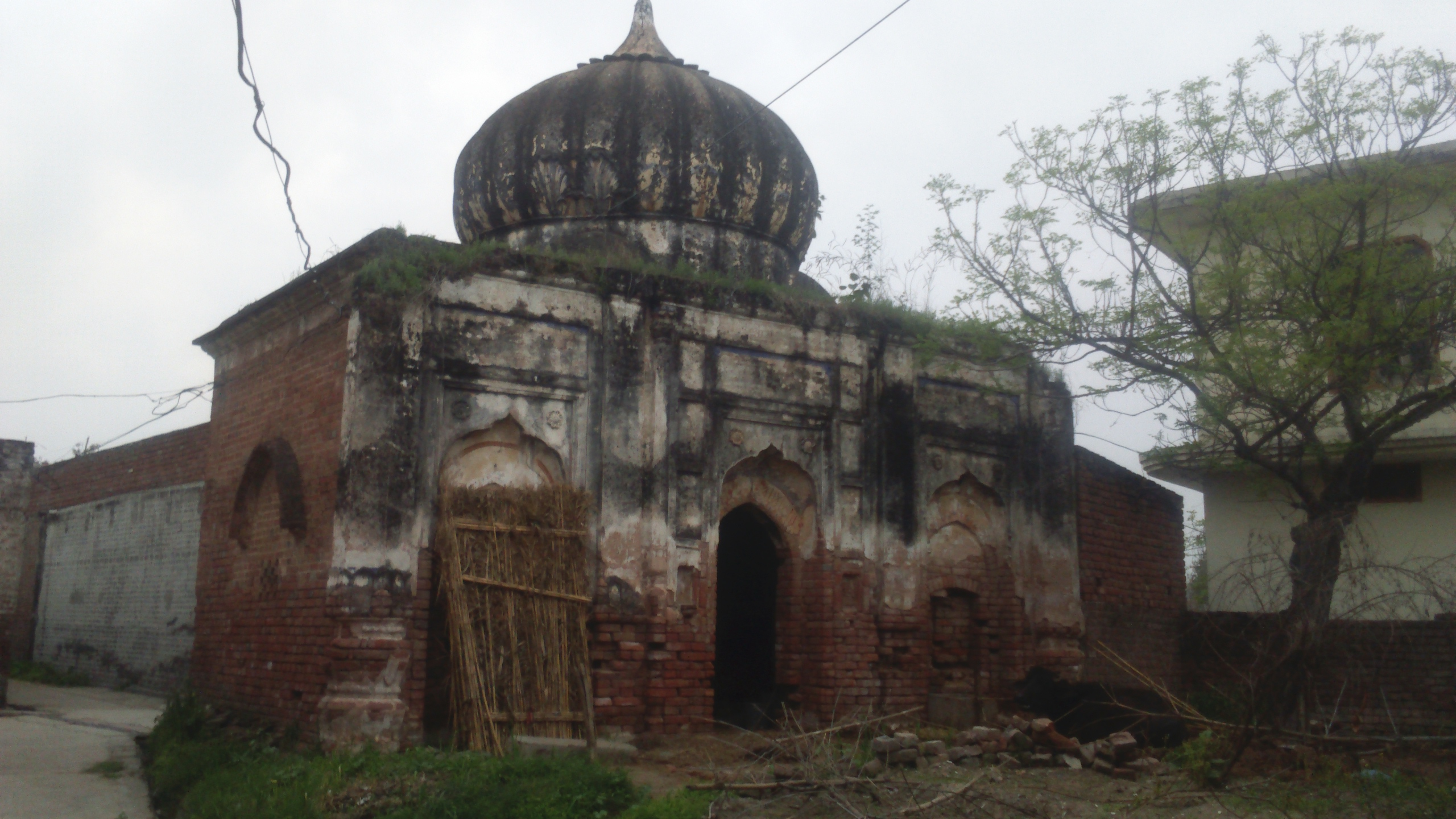
  Old Mosque at Sarthali
3. A Mosque is under the control of the Waqf Board. It was constructed by Muslims who are once inhabitants of village before 1947.
4. Chup Shah is an old building with three rooms and one well. It was settled by the inhabitants of Sarthali before India-Pakistan partition in the memory of a Muslim saint named Chup Shah (Silent Fakeer).

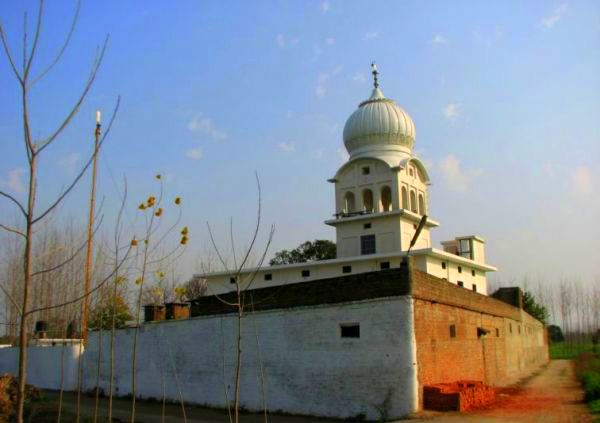
Side view of Gurudwara Rantham Sahib

Gurudwara Rantham Sahib:

Gurudwara Rantham Sahib preserves the memory of tenth master of Sikhism Guru, Gobind Singh. This is a historical Gurudwara. The Mughals of Bajrur are brutal to common people, so Guru Gobind Singh sent an army group in the command of Sahibjada Ajit Singh, they fought with bravery and get common people free. Here, at the place of this gurudwara, the battle has been stopped so it is sid Ran (battle) Tham (commencement).
