= Ghanaur =

- Town
- Location in Punjab, India Ghanaur (India)
- Coordinates: 30.33°N 76.61°E
- Country: India
- State: Punjab
- District: Patiala
- Elevation: 255 m (837 ft)

Population (2001)
  - Total: 5,754

Languages
  - Official: Punjabi
  - Regional: Puadhi
- Time zone: UTC+5:30 (IST)
- PIN: 140702

Ghanaur is a town and a Nagar Panchayat in Patiala district in the state of Punjab, India and it is Sub-Tehsil of Rajpura with powers of Joint Magistrate.

A 1904 Punjab States Gazetteer lists Ghanaur among the Taoni Rajputs' chhats (principal villages).

== Geography ==
Ghanaur is located at 30.33°N 76.61°E. It has an average elevation of 255 metres (836 feet).

The Battle of Ghanaur happened here.

== Demographics ==
As of 2001 India census, Ghanaur had a population of 5754. Males constitute 53% of the population and females 47%. Ghanaur has an average literacy rate of 64%, higher than the national average of 59.5%: male literacy is 68%, and female literacy is 60%. In Ghanaur, 12% of the population is under 6 years of age. The Ghagar river flows near ghanaur. Narvana branch canal also touches the North side of town.
