= Motemajra =

- village
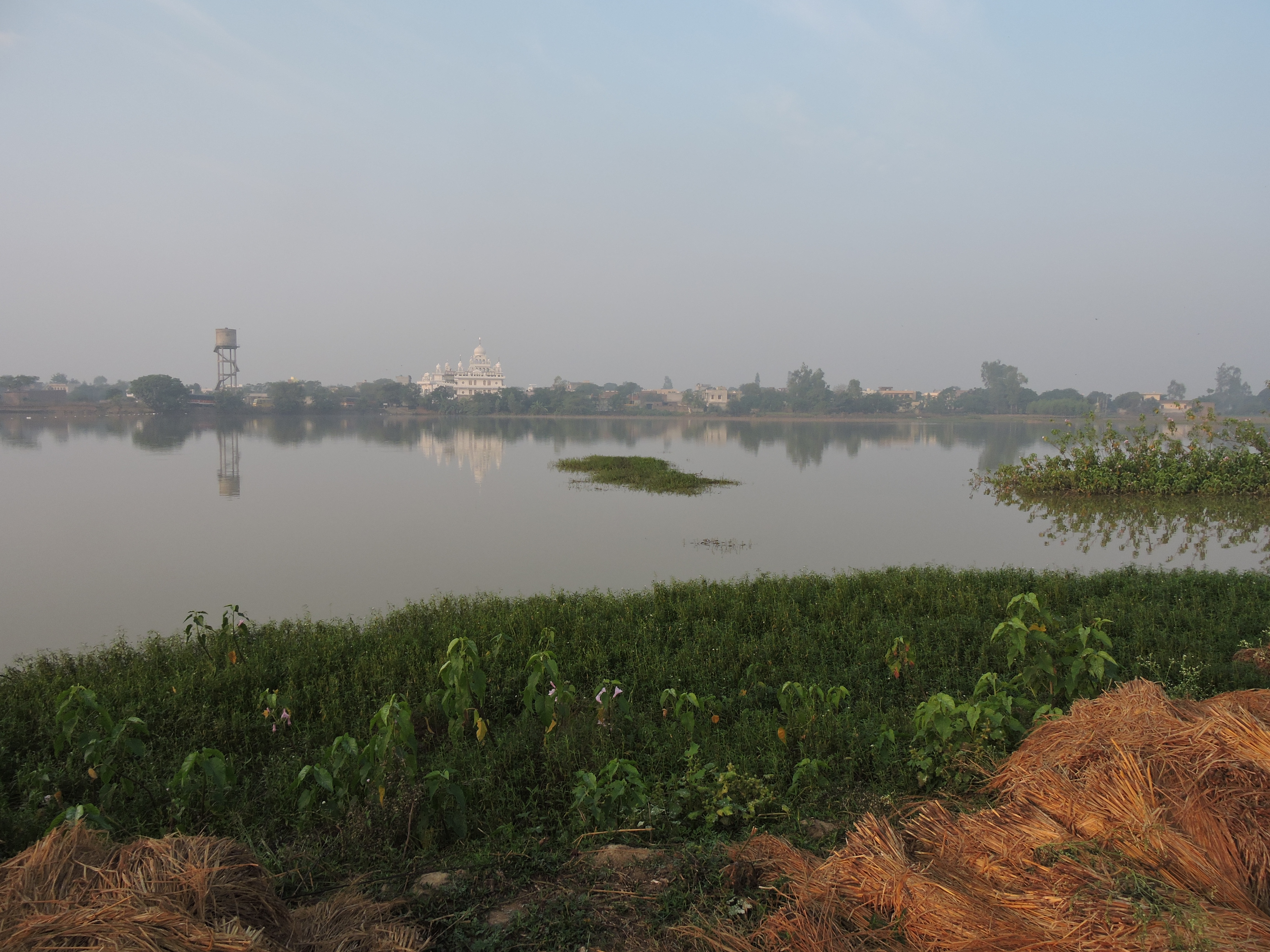
- Village Pond Motemajra

- Location in Punjab, India Motemajra (India)
- Coordinates: 30.62145°N 76.72495°E
- Country: India
- State: Punjab
- District: SAS Nagar

Government
  - Body: Panchayat

Languages
  - Official: Punjabi
- Time zone: UTC+5:30 (IST)
- PIN: 142001
- Vehicle registration: PB29
- Nearest city: Banur
- Lok Sabha constituency: Anandpur Sahib
- Civic agency: Panchayat

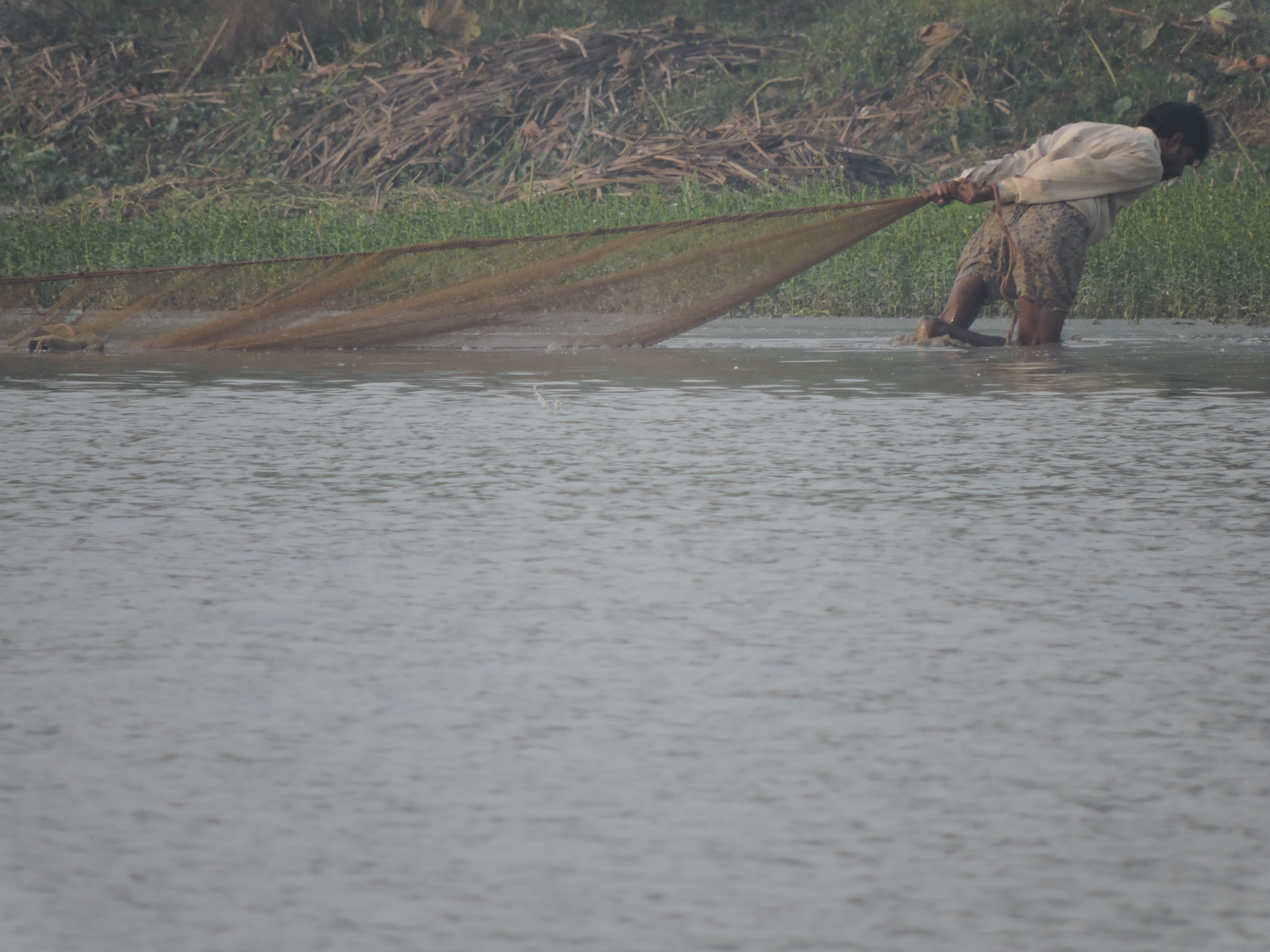
Fishing on lease, Village Pond Motemajra, SAS Nagar, Punjab, India-causing problems and fear among birds

Motemajra is a Village on Landran to Banur road in state of Punjab, India. It is situated near Banur town in district SAS Nagar, Mohali. As per 2023 census of government of India population of this village is 1691 out of which number of male and female was 902 and 789 respectively. (S. No. 92).
