= Julfa Mata Temple =

Hindu temple in Nangal, Punjab, India

Religion
- Affiliation: Hinduism
- District: Rupnagar district
- Deity: Julfa Mata

Location
- Location: Nangal
- State: Punjab
- Country: India

The Julfa Mata Temple is a Hindu temple in the town of Nangal, Rupnagar district, Punjab, India. Near the entrance of the temple, on the right hand side, there is a Shiva temple.
