= Karoran =

- Census town
- Location in Punjab, India Karoran (India)
- Coordinates: 30.8053°N 76.8204°E
- Country: India
- State: Punjab
- District: Rupnagar

Population (2001)
  - Total: 20,351

Languages
  - Official: Punjabi
- Time zone: UTC+5:30 (IST)

Karoran is a census town in Rupnagar district in the Indian state of Punjab.

== Demographics ==
As of 2001 India census, Karoran had a population of 20,351. Males constitute 56% of the population and females 44%. Karoran has an average literacy rate of 65%, higher than the national average of 59.5%: male literacy is 73%, and female literacy is 56%. In Karoran, 15% of the population is under 6 years of age.
