= Morinda, Punjab =

Morinda Baganwaala
- City
- Nickname: City of Orchards
- Location in Punjab, India Morinda (India)
- Coordinates: 30.79°N 76.5°E
- Country: India
- State: Punjab
- District: Rupnagar

Area
  - Total: 9 km^{2} (3.5 sq mi)
- Elevation: 267 m (876 ft)

Population (2001)
  - Total: 21,788
  - Density: 2,400/km^{2} (6,300/sq mi)

Languages
  - Official: Punjabi
  - Regional: Puadhi
- Time zone: UTC+5:30 (IST)
- PIN: 140101
- Telephone code: 0160
- Vehicle registration: PB 87 XX XXXX

Morinda is a city with Municipal Council, near city of Rupnagar in Rupnagar District in the Indian state of Punjab. It can be known as Moran and then Morinda.

Morinda is known in the local region for housing one of the 23 Co-operative Sugar Mills in the State of Punjab. It is also known as Baganwaala, "The City of Orchards". This is because Large Orchards occupied it once which were eventually cleared for housing.

The City is located on National Highway 5 (India)(Connecting Chandigarh and Ludhiana). This benefits local businesses, enabling the town development and expansion. Today, Morinda grows at a faster rate than its neighbouring towns. A lot of industries of nearby towns such as Bassi Pathana have moved to Morinda.

Adding to the historical significance of the town is Gurudwara Shri Kotwaali Sahib. This was the prison (Kotwali) where the Mother, Mata Gujri of 10th Sikh Guru (Guru Gobind Singh) and his two sons were kept as prisoners before being taken to Fatehgarh Sahib where the sons sacrificed their lives. They were buried alive in the walls and later Mata Gujri also ended her life at the same place.

A 1904 Punjab States Gazetteer lists Morinda among the Taoni Rajputs' chhats (principal villages).

== Geography ==
It is located on Ludhiana-Chandigarh Highway, NH95. It lies in Ropar District.

=== Climate ===
Climate data for Morinda, Punjab
Month	Jan	Feb	Mar	Apr	May	Jun	Jul	Aug	Sep	Oct	Nov	Dec	Year
Mean daily maximum °F (°C)	70 (21)	74 (23)	85 (29)	98 (37)	107 (42)	109 (43)	100 (38)	94 (34)	93 (34)	91 (33)	82 (28)	74 (23)	89.75 (32.08)
Mean daily minimum °F (°C)	39 (4)	43 (6)	50 (10)	60 (16)	70 (21)	78 (26)	80 (27)	76 (24)	69 (21)	56 (13)	47 (8)	42 (6)	59.166 (15.09)
Source: <Meteoblue >"Meteoblue - weather close to you". Climate Morinda. Meteoblue. 2016.

== Demographics ==
As of 2001 India census, Morinda had a Population of 21,788. Males Constitute 53% of the Population and Females 47%. Morinda has an Average Literacy Rate of 70%, Higher than the National Average of 59.5%: Male Literacy is 74%, and Female Literacy is 66%. In Morinda, 11% of the Population is under 6 years of Age.

== Infrastructure ==
=== Education ===
Morinda has also become an education hub, since there are more than five universities and a large college network around the city, such as the Charanjit Singh Memorial Institute of Nursing Education, near the Ludhiana-Morinda Bypass.
