= Banur =

Banur Banoor, Binoor or Binor
- Location within Punjab
- Coordinates: 30°33′N 76°43′E
- Country: India
- State: Punjab
- District: Sahibzada Ajit Singh Nagar (Mohali)

Government
  - Type: Punjab Mohali GMADA

Population (2011)
  - Total: 18,775

Languages
  - Official: Punjabi
  - Regional: Puadhi
- Time zone: UTC+5:30 (IST)
- PIN: 140601
- Vehicle registration: PB65

Banur (also transliterated as Banoor, Binoor and Binor) is a small town in the Punjab state of India. It is located in the Sahibzada Ajit Singh Nagar district of Punjab. It is about 22 km south of Mohali, 12 km north of Rajpura and 30 km south west of Chandigarh. It is well connected to its district Mohali and the capital City of Chandigarh. It is located on the Chandigarh-Patiala National Highway.

== History ==
The Banur was formerly a Chhat of Taoni Rajputs before 1948. During Mughal times, Banur was a sizeable town along with its neighbour Chatt. Banda Singh Bahadur marched from Lohgarh, as the Muslims of Banur used to seize cows and oxen of Hindus and slaughter them in their presence, he reduced Banur to ruins in 1709, on his way to Sirhind-Fategarh.

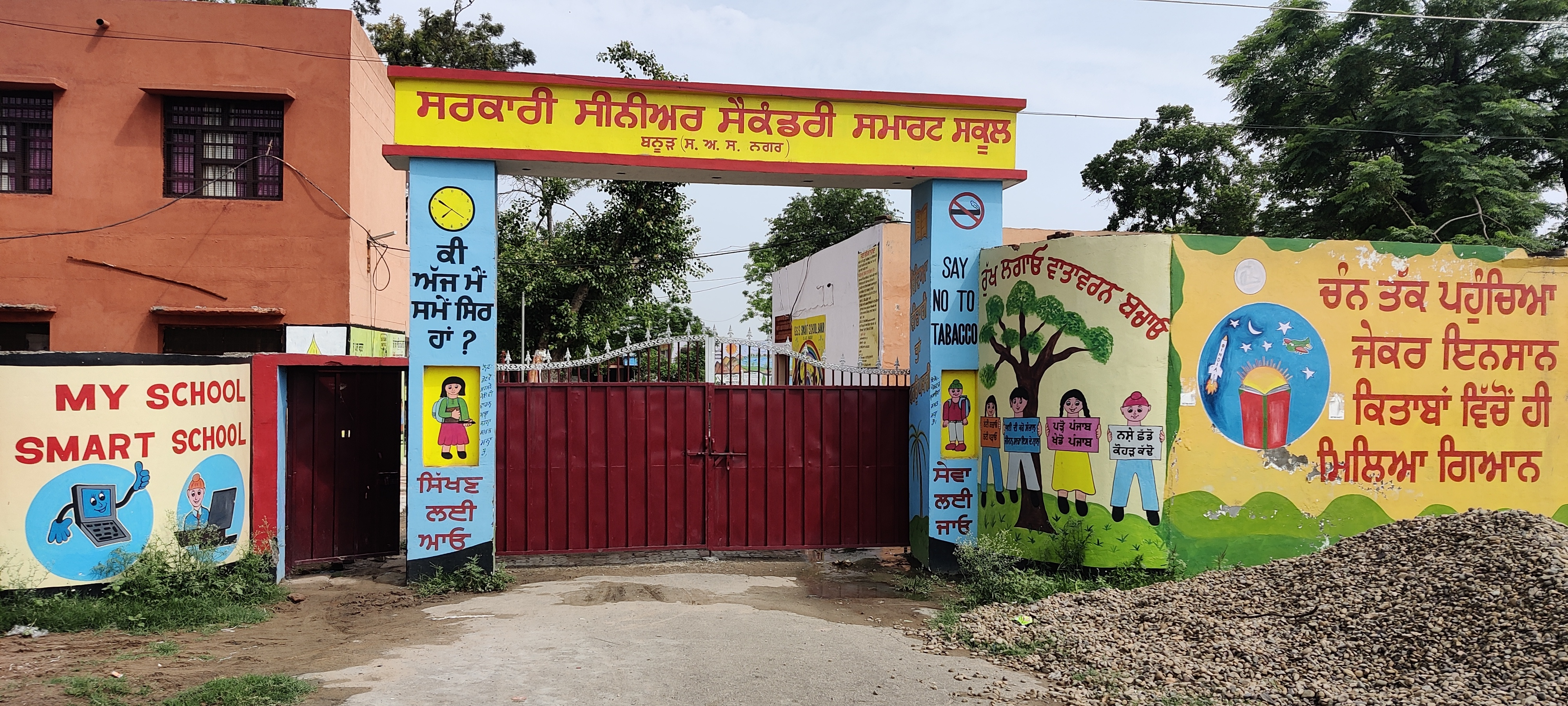
Entrance of Govt. Senior Secondary School Banur (SAS Nagar)

== Demographics ==
In 2011, according to Census India, Banur had a population of 18,775, including 9,889 males and 8,886 females. 13.4% of the total population were children, and literacy rate was above the state average at nearly 77%. In 2011, Banur Municipal Council had total administration over 3,639 households.

== Religion ==
The town's mosque fell during the 1990s, due to ravages of time and weather. However, Banur still has many old temples, such as Mai Banno temple, Basanti Devi temple, Gugga Mari and Shitla Mata temple.

A three-day mela (religious fair) is organised every year at Gugga Mari on Naumi of Shraavana month, where people offer onions and wheat at the Mari. A mela is also organised at Shitla Mata temple every year where people offer chickpeas, dal and water.

Banur has a Gurudwara on the Chandigarh-Rajpura National Highway, which is in memory of Banda Singh Bahadur. The Gurudwara organises various religious functions every year.

Banur is also diksha place of Jain saint Aatma Ram ji maharaj, who became a Jain monk under a tree in this city. Later he became Aacharya(head) of Jain shwetambar sthanakwasi shraman sangh. Many Jain monks visit this city time to time and chaturmas are held every year.

== Colleges and institutes ==
- Chitkara University
- Industrial Training Institute
- Sanawar Model School
- Holy Mary's School

== See also ==
- Chhatbir Zoo
- Khizergarh
