= Kamalpur, Rupnagar =

Kamalpur
- village
- Location in India
- Country: India
- State: Punjab
- District: Rupnagar

Population (2011)
  - Total: 593

Languages
  - Official: Punjabi
- Time zone: UTC+5:30 (IST)

Kamalpur is a village in Rupnagar district in the Indian state of Punjab.
