= Khizergarh =

Khizergarh (Kanaur) is a village in Banur area of Mohali (SAS Nagar) at the 18th District in Punjab, India. In past years, it was a part of the Patiala District, and was inducted into SAS Nagar in recent years. Its coordinates are 30°35'3"N 76°45'21"E.

== Climate ==
Khizergarh has a sub-tropical continental monsoon climate characterized by a seasonal rhythm: hot summers, slightly cold winters, unreliable rainfall and great variation in temperature (−1 to 44 °C or 30 to 111 °F). In winter, frost sometimes occurs during December and January. The average annual rainfall is recorded at 617 millimetres (24.3 in). The city also receives occasional winter rains from the west.

Average temperature

- Summer: The temperature in summer may rise to a maximum of 44 °C (111 °F). Temperatures generally remain between 35 and 42 °C (95 and 108 °F).
- Autumn: In autumn, the temperature may rise to a maximum of 36 °C (97 °F). Temperatures usually remain between 16 and 27 °C (61 and 81 °F) in autumn. The minimum temperature is around 13 °C (55 °F).
- Winter: Average temperatures in winter (November to February) remain at (maximum) 7 to 15 °C (45 to 59 °F) and (minimum) −2 and 5 °C (28 and 41 °F).
- Spring: spring temperatures vary between (min) 16 and 25 °C (61 and 77 °F) (max).
