= Kiratpur Sahib =

Kiratpur Sahib Patalpuri sahib
- Town
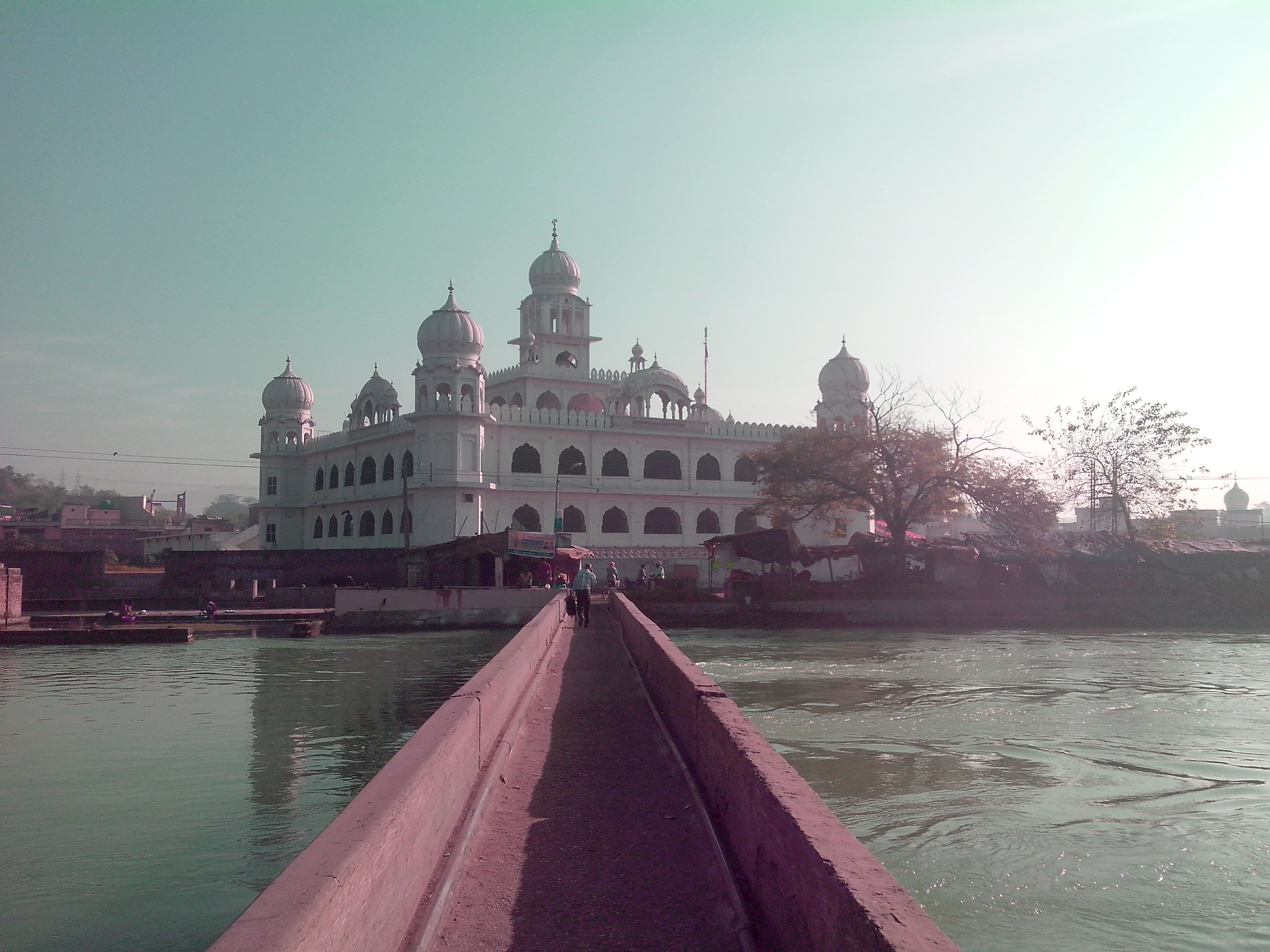
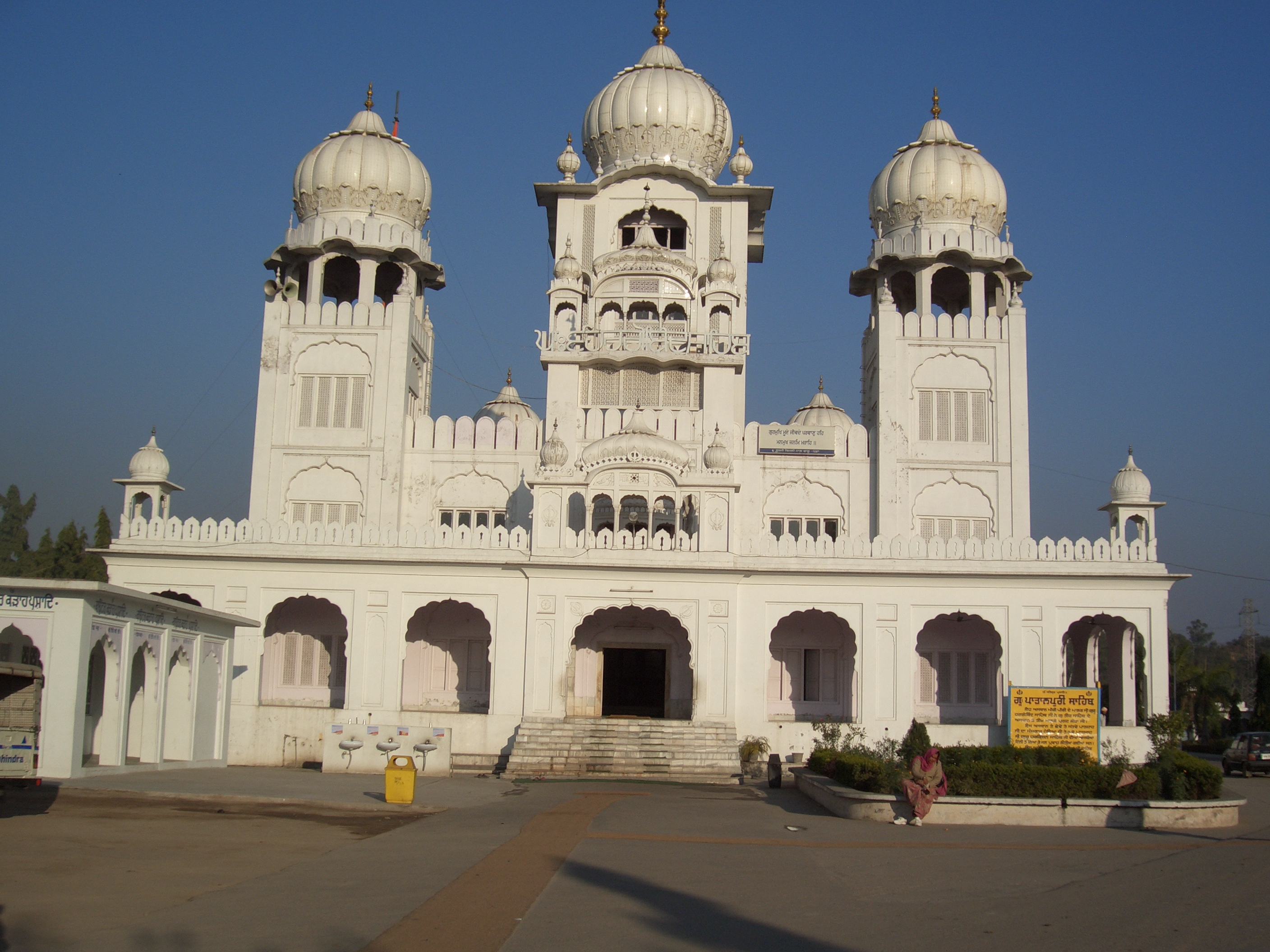
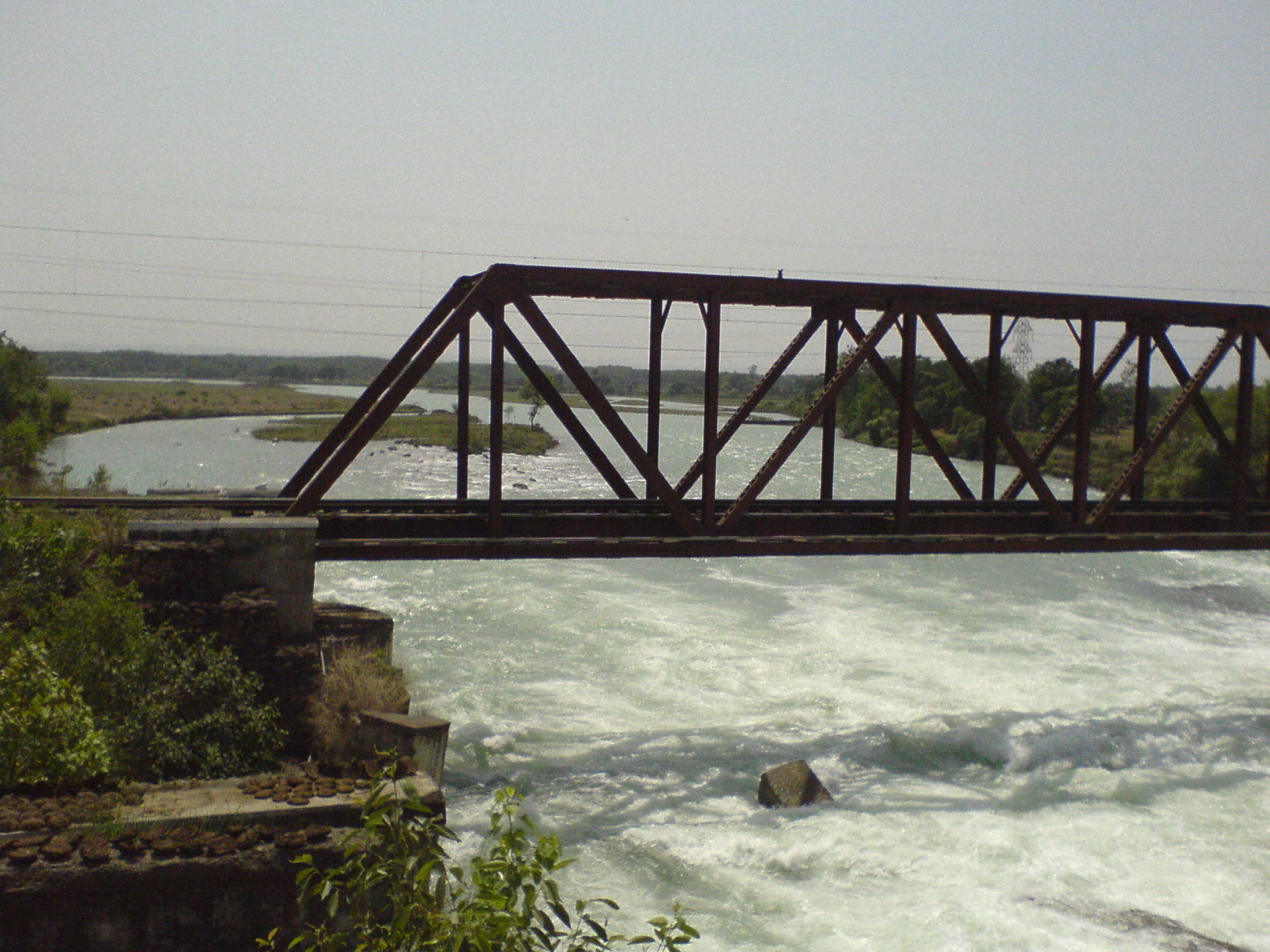
- Gurdwara Charan Kamal, Gurdwara Patalpuri Sahib, Bridge KPS.

- Location in Punjab, India
- Coordinates: 31.1820758°N 76.5635490°E
- Country: India
- State: Punjab
- District: Rupnagar
- Established: 1627
- Founder: Guru Hargobind Sahib ji

Population (2011)
  - Total: 2,348

Languages
  - Official: Punjabi
- Time zone: UTC+5:30 (IST)
- PIN: 140115
- Telephone code: 01887
- Vehicle registration: PB-16
- Coastline: 0 kilometres (0 mi)
- Nearest city: Anandpur Sahib

Kiratpur, also known as Kiratpur Sahib, (lit. "city of glory") is a town, just 30 km from Rupnagar city in Rupnagar district of Punjab, India. The habitation was founded by Guru Hargobind. The town is the location of the Gurdwara Patal Puri where many Sikhs take ashes of their deceased.

Kiratpur was the place-of-residence for three Sikh gurus: Guru Hargobind, Guru Har Rai, and Guru Har Krishan.

== Kiratpur Sahib Town ==
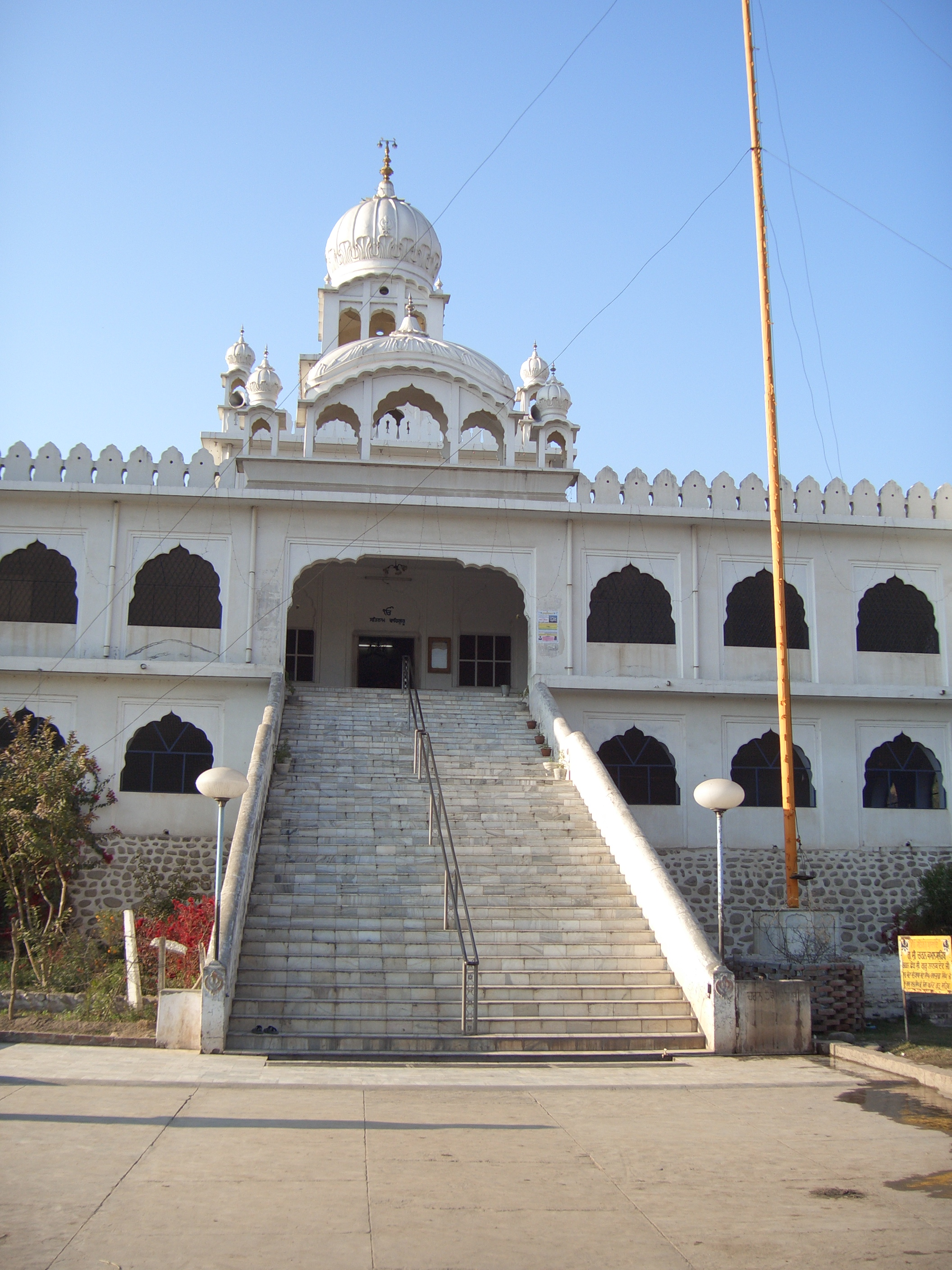
Gurdwara Charan Kamal, Kiratpur Sahib, Punjab.

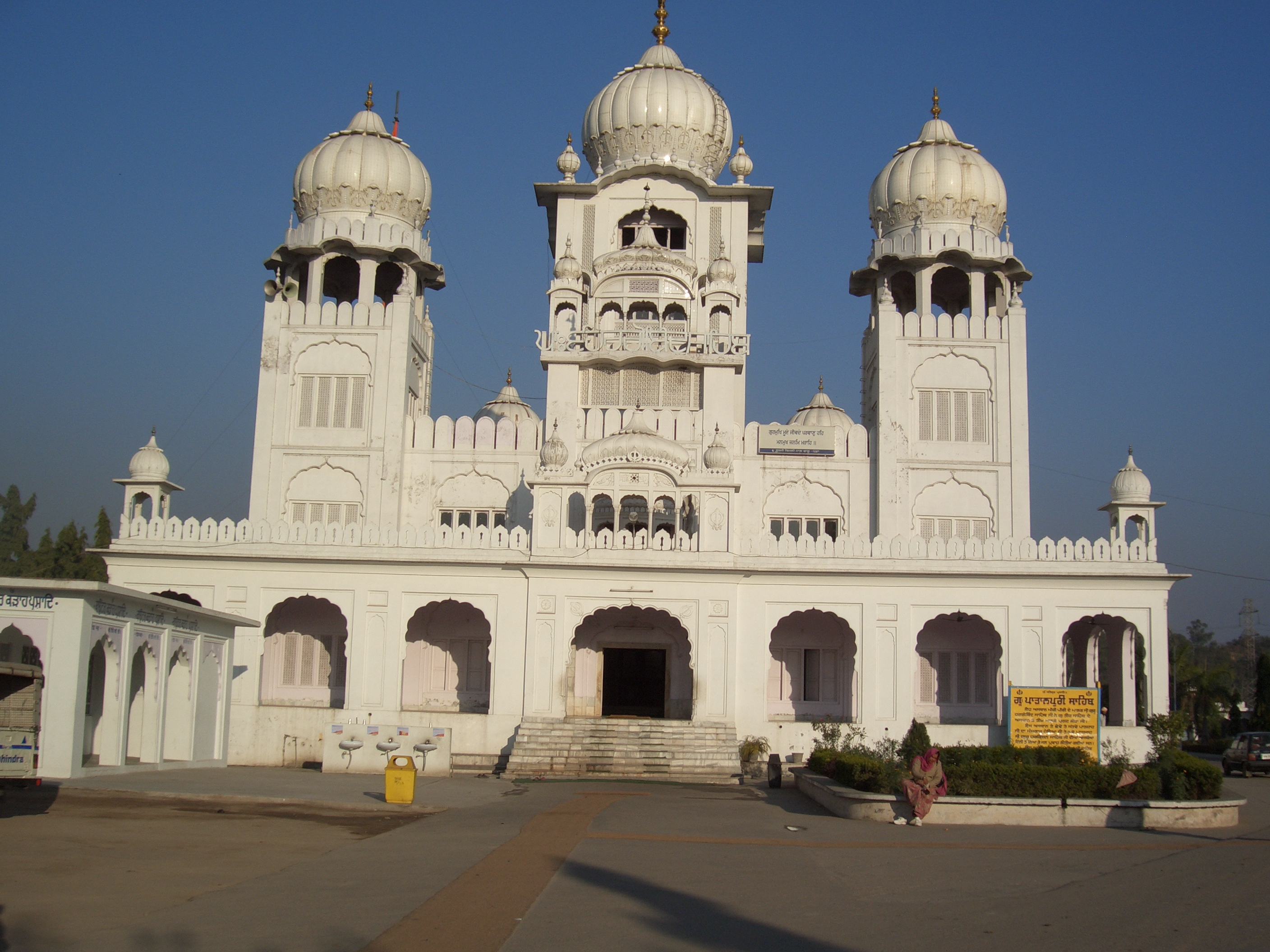
Gurdwara Patalpuri, Kiratpur Sahib, Punjab

Kiratpur Sahib (31.1820758°N 76.5635490°E) was established in 1627 by the 6th Sikh Guru, Guru Hargobind, who bought the land from Raja Tara Chand of Kehlur through his son, Baba Gurditta. However, Gurinder Singh Mann states that Guru Hargobind founded Kiratpur in 1634. The place is also associated with the memory of a Muslim saint, Pir Buddan Shah.

It is situated on the bank of the Sutlej about 10 km south of Anandpur, about 30 km north of Rupnagar and 90 km from Chandigarh on the Nangal-Rupnagar-Chandigarh road (NH21).

It is a sacred place for the Sikhs. Guru Nanak Dev is said to have visited this place when it was little more than a wilderness. Guru Hargobind, the sixth Guru spent the last few years of his life here. Both Guru Har Rai and Guru Harkrishan were also born at this place and they received the Gurgadi (Guruship) at this place.

There is a reference to this place in the hit film, Veer-Zaara (2004). Zohra Sehgal, plays a character in this movie whose last wish is that her ashes should be immersed in Kiratpur.

== History ==
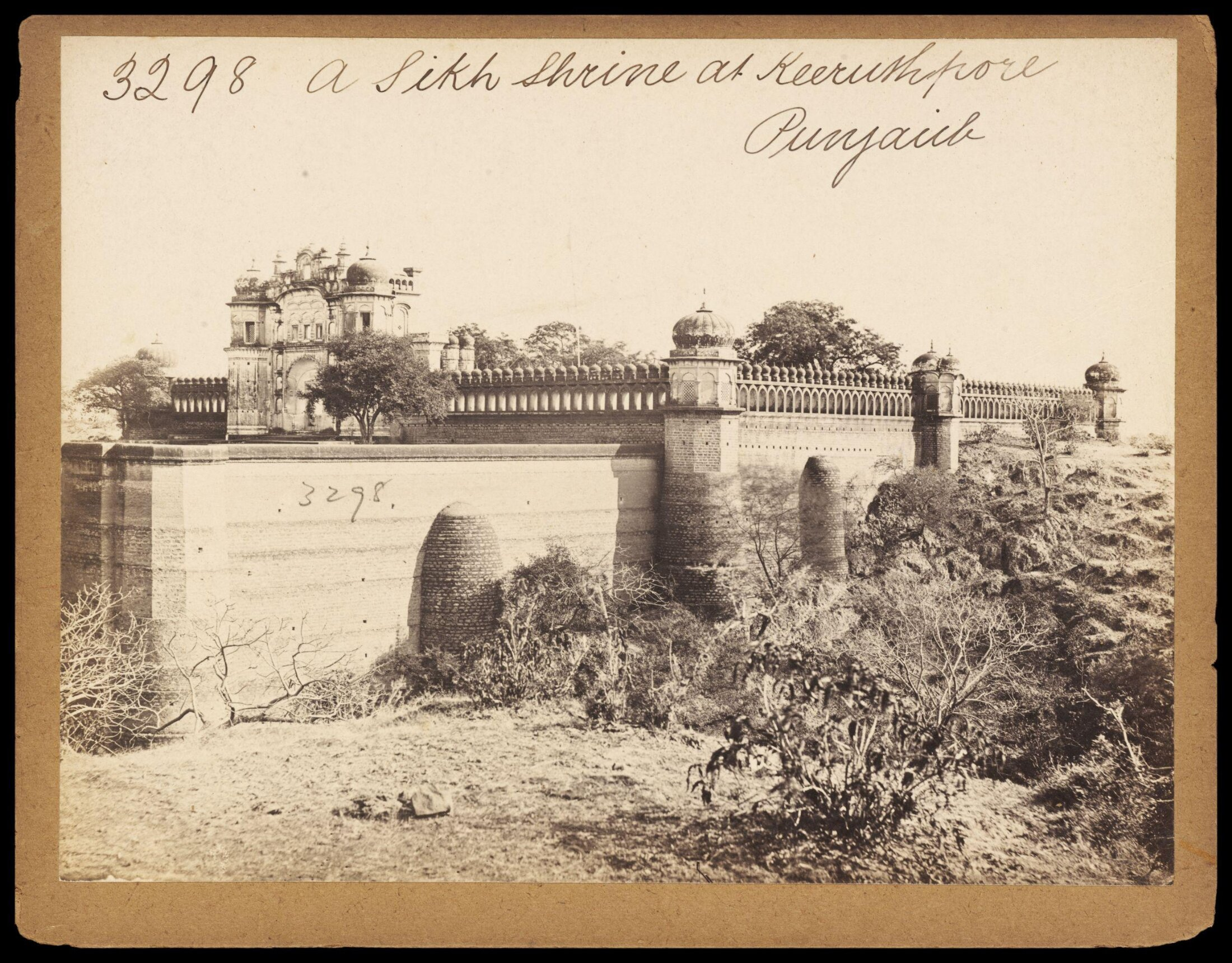
"A Sikh Shrine at Keeruthpore, Punjaub" by Francis Frith, ca.1850's–1870's. Likely Gurdwara Baba Gurditta

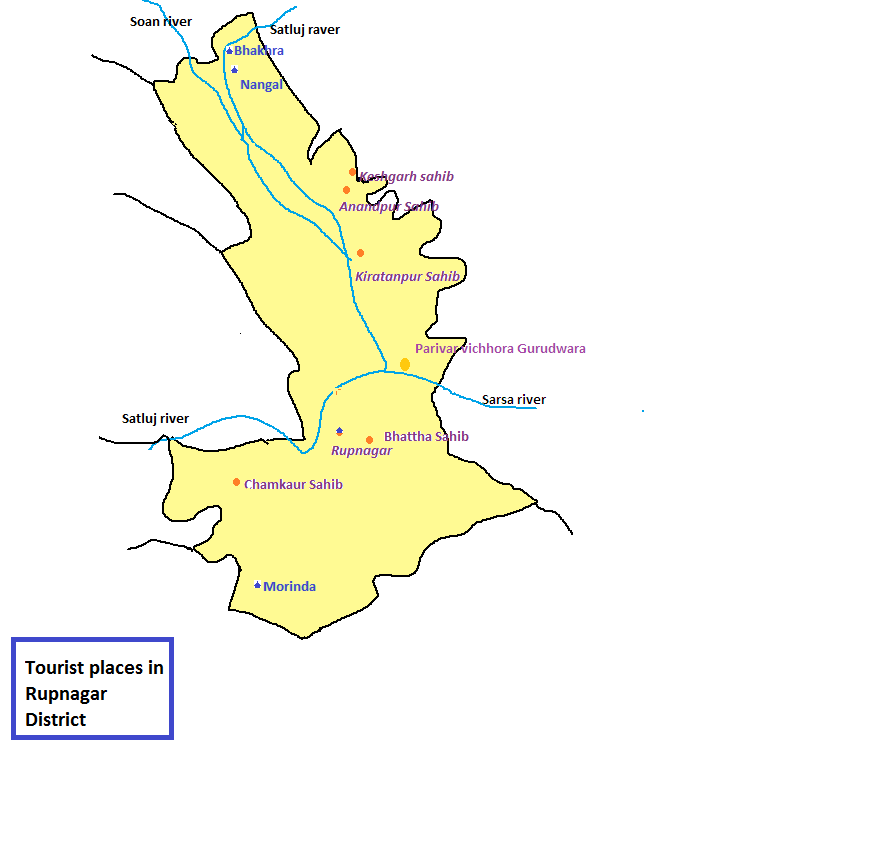
Location of Kiratpur Sahib in district Rupnagar

In 1628 AD, Guru Hargobind visited Raja Kalyan Chand at his capital Kot-Kehloor. Chandel Rajput Raja gifted him the village of Kiratpur and Kalyanpur as Jagir. The Mughal Emperor Jahangir took objection of these intimate relations between Raja and Guru ji and asked Raja to remove Guru from hill state of Kehloor. But Raja refused the emperor’s wish. Raja Kalyan Chand shifted his capital from Kot-Kehloor to Sunhani (Bilaspur).

Kiratpur Sahib was founded by Guru Hargobind in 1634, who shifted base for the Sikh community there from Kartarpur. Here the seventh and eighth Gurus were born and brought up. Guru Har Rai and Guru Har Krishan remained at Kiratpur Sahib and kept it as the base for the Sikhs. However, Guru Tegh Bahadur shifted the community to Anandpur Sahib in 1664, which he had founded.

It was here that Guru Gobind Singh along with his followers received the sacred head of the ninth Guru Sri Tegh Bahadur, brought from Delhi with great devotion and respect by Bhai Jaita in 1675. The particular spot associated with and sanctified by it, is known as Gurudwara Babangarh Sahib. The tenth Guru took the sacred head of his father in a procession to Anandpur Sahib for cremation. The Punjab Government has constructed a pillar here, on which is inscribed the following quotation from Guru Gobind Singh describing the unique martyrdom of Sri Guru Tegh Bahadurji, "The Lord (Guru Tegh Bahadur) protected their paste mark (Tilak) - and the sacred thread. A great deed he enacted in the age of kala (darkness)".

The city and its many Gurdwaras are sacred places for the Sikhs as several of the Sikh Gurus visited, were born and lived here. The ashes of several Gurus were immersed in the nearby Sutlej River. Even today many Sikhs come here to spread the ashes of their loved ones in the River.

The area is also associated with the memory of a Muslim saint, Pir Buddan Shah who was gifted with a very long life (local legends say about 800 years).

The Gurdwara is situated on the bank of the river Sutlej about 10 km south of Anandpur and about 30 km north of Rupnagar. It is on the Nangal-Rupnagar-Chandigarh road (NH21).

== People from Kiratpur Sahib ==
- Kanshi Ram, Ex. Member of Parliament, Former Leader of Bahujan Samaj Party
- Dr. Rattan Chand, IAS, Senior Bureaucrat, Government of India.

== Religious Places ==
=== Gurdwaras ===
There are many gurdwaras in the town:

- Gurdwara Patalpuri Sahib (Kiratpur Sahib
- Gurdwara Baba Gurditta (Kiratpur Sahib)
- Gurdwara Babangarh Sahib (Kiratpur Sahib)
- Gurdwara Shish Mahal Sahib (Kiratpur Sahib)
- Gurdwara Manji Sahib
- Gurdwara Charankamal Sahib
- Gurdwara Sri Hargobindsar Sahib (Dadhi)

==== Gurdwara Patal Puri ====
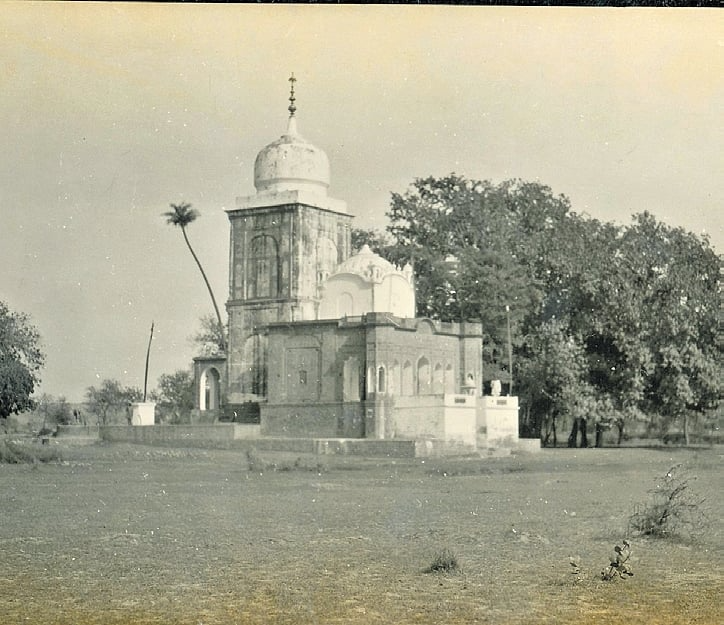
Photograph of Gurdwara Patalpuri Sahib in Kiratpur Sahib, by Dhanna Singh Chahal 'Patialvi', circa May 1934

This Gurdwara, on the banks of the Sutlej, is situated near the railway tracks and is the place where many Sikhs take the ashes of their deceased to be immersed in the river. Guru Hargobind in 1644, as well as Guru Har Rai in 1661, were both cremated here. The ashes of Guru Harkrishan were brought from Delhi and immersed here in 1664. The gurdwara suffered from long queues during the COVID-19 pandemic.

==== Gurdwara Babangarh Sahib ====
Bhai Jaita (Jiwan Singh after baptism), in defiance of the Mughal authorities had managed to escape with the martyred head of the 9th Guru Sri Guru Tegh Bahadur from Delhi after his martyrdom in 1675. It was first rested here. From Gurdwara Teer Sahib the 6th Guru had revealed Gurdwara Patal-Puri by shooting an arrow. The 7th Guru was cremated at Patal Puri and ashes of the 8th Guru were immersed in river Satluj nearby. Gurdwara Baba Gurditta is located on a hill close by.

==== Gurdwara Shish Mahal ====
Gurdwara Shish Mahal in Kiratpur has been constructed on the site of the first building completed in the then New city of Kiratpur. Though the first building completed, it was not the first begun as the laying of Kiratpur Sahib's 'foundation stone' had preceded it. This was the home of Baba Gurditta, Guru Hargobind's eldest son, which later also served as the home of his father Guru Hargobind when he moved to Kiratpur Sahib in May 1635. Before leaving Kiratpur in 1635 the Guru's sons—the later Gurus—Guru Har Rai and Guru Harkrishan were both born here. Guru Har Rai's son Ram Rai and his daughter Bibi Rup Kaur were also born here.

First built as the home of Baba Gurditta Guru Hargobind later established his residence here. Both Sri Guru Har Rai Ji and Sri Guru Harkrishan Ji were born in the residence

==== Gurdwara Charankamal Gurudawara ====
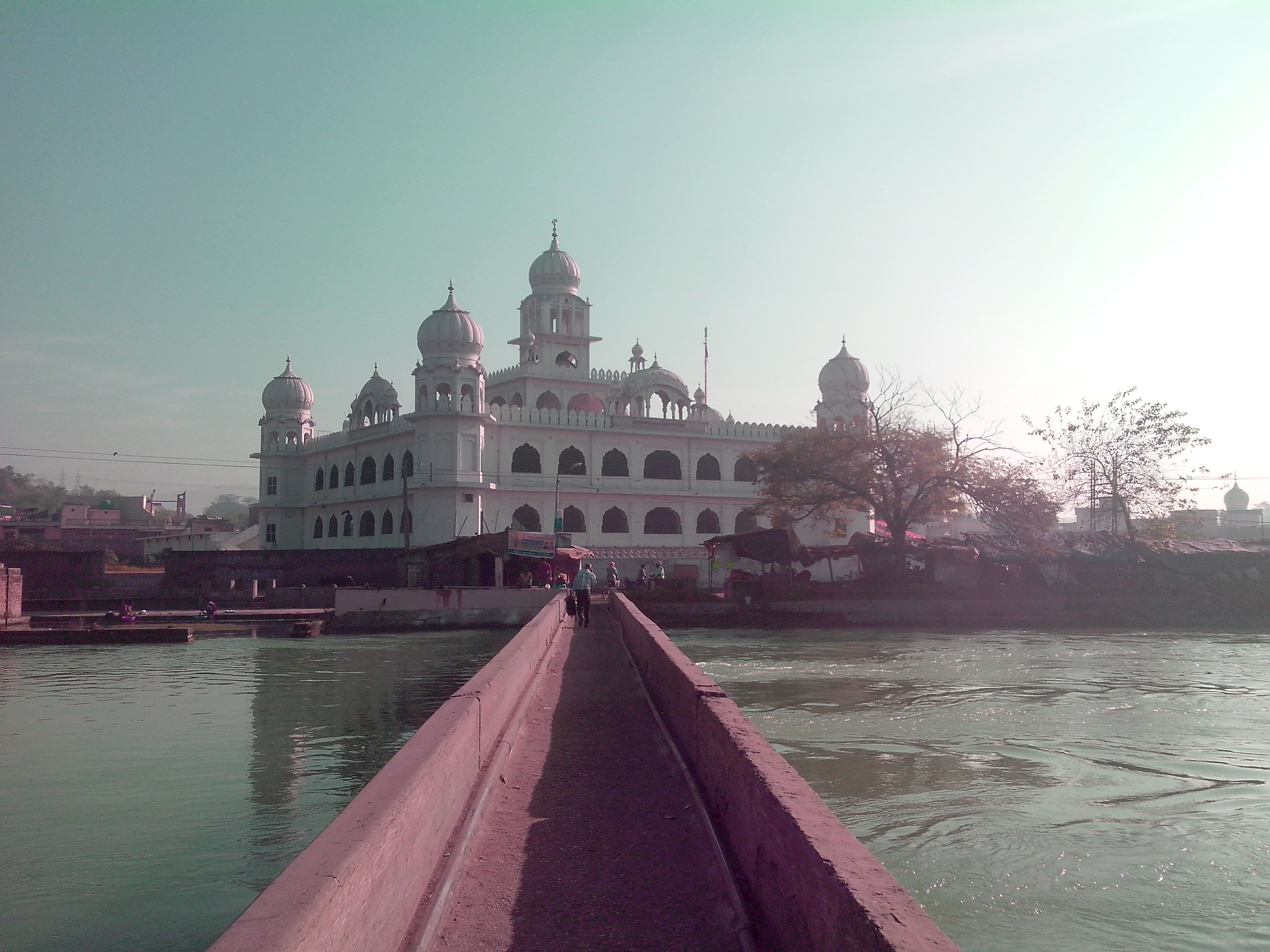
Gurudwara Charan Kamal

it commemorates the spot where the Pir had met the 1st Guru of Sikhism, Sri Guru Nanak Dev Ji. His mausoleum is located on a hill nearby. He died after the Guru Hargobind had established Kiratpur.

==== Gurdwara Baba Gurdita Ji ====
Gurudwara Baba Gurditta Ji is situated in the city Kiratpur Of Ropar District. It stands on the top of the hill, about one km from the town and built in memory of Baba Gurditta Ji(Son of GURU HARGOBIND SAHIB JI) and Baba Sri Chand Ji. Baba Gurditta Ji died at this place.

==== Gurudwara Sri Hargobindsar Sahib ====
Gurudwara Sri Hargobindsar Sahib is located at the historical village Dadhi hardly a Kilometre from Kiratpur Sahib.

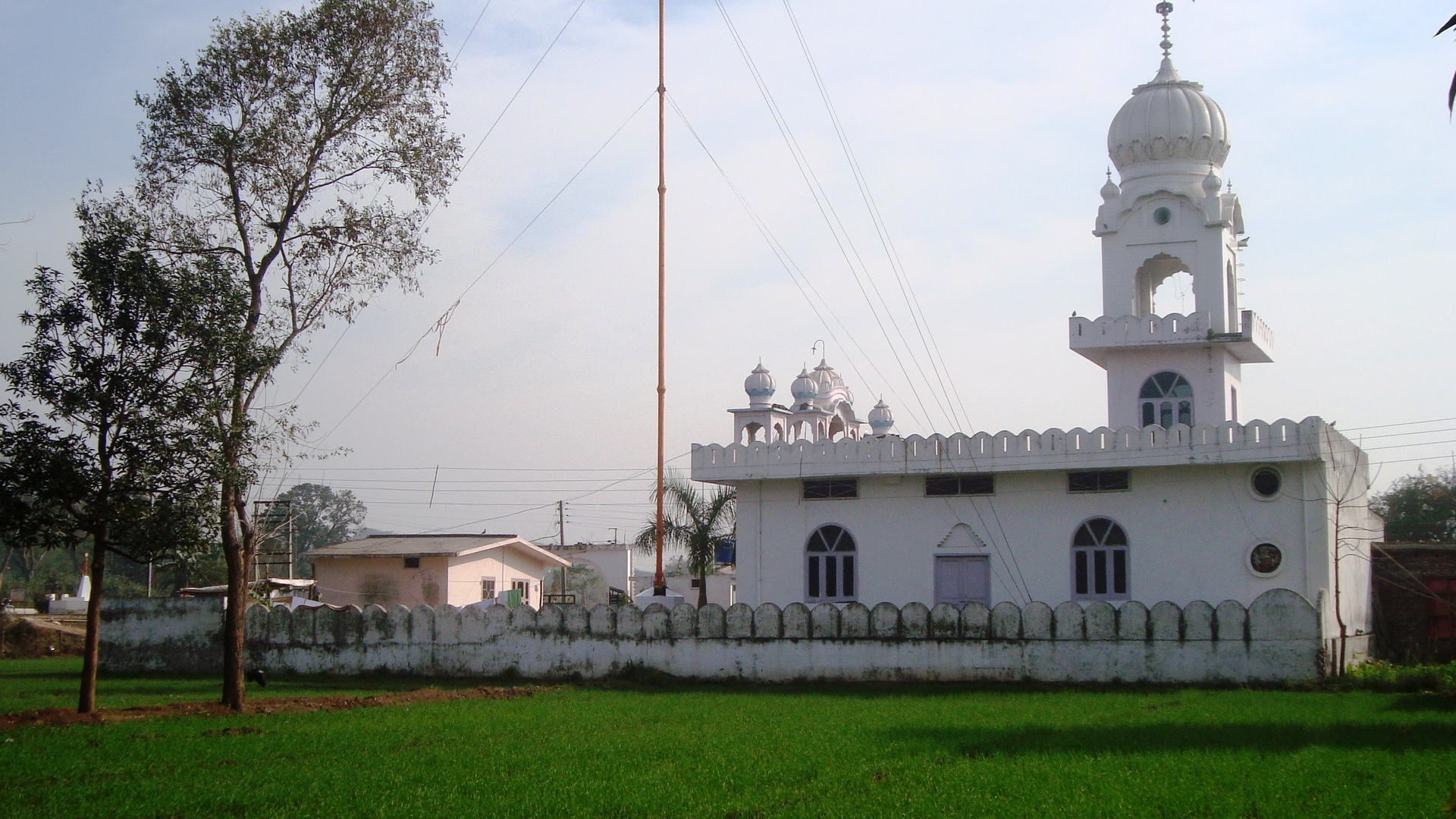
A view of Gurudwara Sri Hargobindsar Sahib at Village Dadhi near Kiratpur Sahib

=== Dargah ===
- Dargah of Baba Budhan shah Ji is also there.

=== Temples ===
- Shree Rama Mandir
- Shree Bhatukeshwar Durga Mandir
- Shree Shiv Mandir

==== Shree Rama Mandir ====
This is one of the ancient temple of the town, which is situated in the main market of the town. Every year jagran is held by the committee of this mandir. And other religious activities are carried out on the special occasions.

==== Shree Bhatukeshwar Durga Mandir ====
This temple was later established in 2004. It is near the postoffice of the town. In this temple also every year jagran and other religious programs are heldby the committee of the temple and by Yuva mandal.

== Education ==
Govt Sr Sec Sch Kiratpur Sahib High School is a notable secondary school in the District. this school has a documented record of academic performance and achievements in sports and culture.

== See also ==
- List of Gurdwaras
