= Nangal =

Nangal Industrial Town of Punjab
- Town
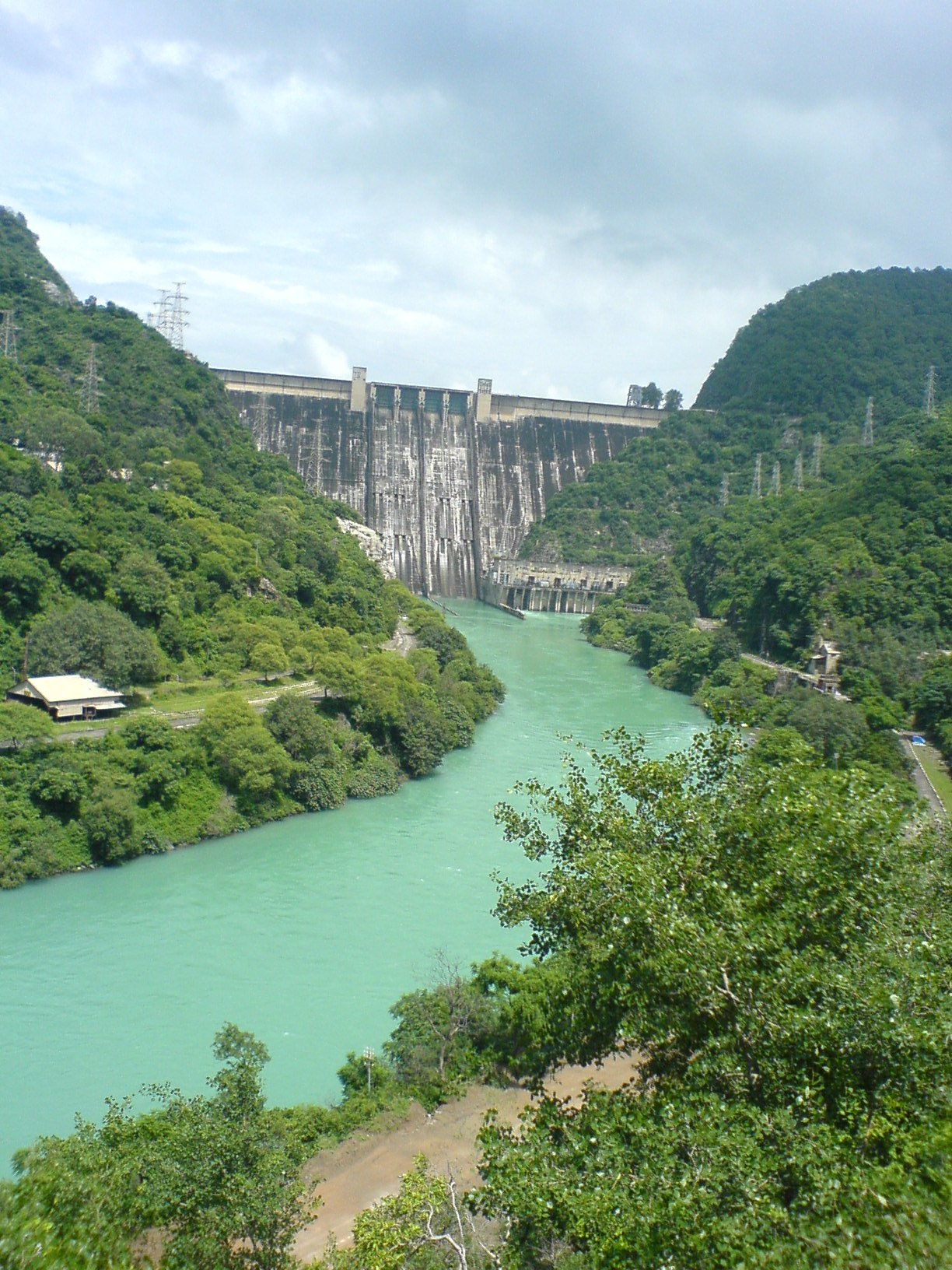
- Bhakra Dam in Bhakra, Bilaspur district, India
- Nickname: NPTI
- Location in Punjab, India Nangal (India)
- Coordinates: 31.385°N 76.375°E
- Country: India
- State: Punjab
- District: Rupnagar
- Established: Dec 2009
- Founder: MOP Govt of India

Government
  - Type: MOP
- Elevation: 326 m (1,070 ft)

Population (2011)
  - Total: 48,000

Languages
  - Official: Punjabi, Hindi
- Time zone: UTC+5:30 (IST)
- PIN: 140124, 140125, 140126

Nangal is a town, near city of Rupnagar in Rupnagar district in Punjab, India.

It sits at the foot of the Shiwalik Hills where it was established after plans for a dam required the movement of previously established villages. Residential areas include Modern Avenue, Shivalik Avenue, Naya Nangal Township, BBMB Township and Nangal Basti area (Railway Road). Industrial areas include Focal Point, NFL Factory, PACL. Naya Nangal is planned town with parks like Madhuvan Park, Captain Amol Kalia Park and stadium like NFL Stadium. Naya Nangal also has Well established Recreational clubs, like Golf club, Naya Nangal NFL club Sector 4, Anand Bhawan Club, Swimming club, Race tracks and cycling tracks.

== History ==
Present Nangal is situated on the land acquired from nearby places in 1948 when the construction of Bhakra Dam was planned on the Satluj River. The town is divided into three parts: Nangal, Nangal Township and Naya Nangal.

== Geography ==
Nangal is situated on the foot of Shivalik hills and spreads over both sides of river Sutlej which forms a lake behind the Nangal Dam. Every year, the multi-purpose Bhakra Dam with its surrounding natural environment attracts a number of tourists from all parts of India and abroad. There are several markets in it, namely Jawahar Market, Main Market, Adda Market, GTB Market & Pahari Market. The residential areas of the city are organized into a block system.

Nangal Township is surrounded by water on three sides and foothills of shivaliks on the fourth side. Naya Nangal serves mainly as a fertilizer complex colony of National Fertilizers Limited (NFL), a public sector undertaking of the Government of India.

There are 3 Main hospitals in Nangal - BBMB Hospital, NFL Hospital in sector 4 and Civil hospital.

Schools include Capt Amol Kalia Fertilizer Model Senior Secondary School (erstwhile, NFL Model Senior Secondary School) affiliated to CBSE, NFL Higher Secondary School affiliated to PSEB, Mount Carmel School affiliated to ICSE, BBMB DAV School affiliated to CBSE, Saint Soldier School affiliated to CBSE and Dayanand School(closed now) affiliated to CBSE.

Nangal city sits on the banks of River Satluj, thus having many tourist attraction points with fascination towards Mother Nature. Prominent Religious Places include Jalpha Devi Mata Mandir, Shree Gita Mandir in Naya Nangal, Shree Shiv Shakti Mandir in Shivalik Colony, Shri Sidh Baba Balak Nath Durga Mandir, Shri Lakshmi Narayan Mandir, Triveni Mandir, Varun Dev Mandir, Gurudwara Shri Bhabour Sahib, Gurudwara Singh Sabha Sector 2 Naya Nangal and Christ Church Sector 1 Naya Nangal.

== Demographics ==
As of 2011 India Census, Nangal had a population of 48000. Males constitute 51% of the population and females 49%. Nangal has an average literacy rate of 78.15%, higher than the national average of 74%: male literacy is 80.69%, and female literacy is 71.56%. In Nangal, 10.44% of the population is under 6 years of age.
