= Kartarpur, Rupnagar =

Village in Rupnagar district, Punjab, India

Kartarpur is a village of 1.86411 sq mi (5 km^{2}) which lies 4 km from NurPur Bedi in Tehsil Anandpur Sahib, Rupnagar district, Punjab, India and 3 km from the Kikar Lodge. Other nearby villages are Gurse Majra and Hayatpur. Kartarpur is located in the foothills of the Shivalik range of the Himalayas.

== Climate ==
Kartarpur has a humid subtropical climate characterized by a seasonal rhythm with very hot summers, mild winters, unreliable rainfall and great variation in temperature (-1 °C to 41.2 °C). The average annual rainfall is 1110.7 mm. Spring temperatures vary between a maximum of 16 °C to 25 °C and minimums 9 °C to 18 °C and the climate is pleasant. Summer is from mid-May to mid-June. Rarely there are very hot days to 45 °C. Temperatures generally remain between 35 and 40 °C (95 and 104 °F). The monsoon season lasts from mid-June to mid-September. Kartarpur receives moderate to heavy rainfall and sometimes heavy to very heavy rainfall (generally during the month of August or September). Usually, the rain bearing monsoon winds blow from south-west / south-east. The maximum amount of rain received by Kartarpur in a single day was 200.5 mm in a single day. Autumn is from mid-March to April. The temperature may rise to a maximum of 36 °C. Temperatures usually remain between 16° and 27°. The minimum temperature is around 11 °C. Winters last from November to mid-March. The temperature is mild but can get chilly. Average temperatures in the winter are (max) 7 °C to 15 °C and (min) -3 °C to 5 °C. Rain comes from the west and usually a lasts for 2–3 days, sometimes with hail.

== Environment ==
The foothills of the Shiwalik Range are forested. Some areas are protected. There are areas of public (village council) and private ownership. Local fauna includes: sambar, muntjacs (barking deer), woodpeckers, peacocks, parrots and forest pigs.

== Governance ==
The village head (Nambardar) is Sh. Mandeep Bhumbla. There is also a national government funded village council (panchayat). It has seven members chaired by Ch Husan Lal Bhumbla.

== Demographics ==
The India 2011 census recorded 5205 inhabitants. Males constitute 56% of the population and females 44%. The sex ratio is 812 females for every 1,000 males. Kartarpur has an average literacy rate of 76.9%, higher than the national average of 64.8%. About 12% of the population is under 6 years of age. the population is predominantly Gujjar's. There are also Gujjar...(Bajarh, Bhumbla, Kassana, Bhatia, Chouhan, Chechi.), (caste)|Nai]], Sunehars, Luhar's Mazhbi's and Khattari in small numbers.

== Economy ==
Kartarpur depends on external sources of income such as government contractors, private contractors, transporters, contractors in flour mills and trade works in the bigger cities. There is little arable land although some families will grow some food. There also no of people in Indian Army (Engineers, survey, Armed, Sikh regt, ord, EME), Punjab police, BSF, CRPF and no of people are teachers, angan vari madam, nurses or in banking profession. some are in multinational company and in abroad.

== Education ==
There is a kindergarten, the Agan vari (Worker-1. Anita Rani, 2. Jaswinder Kaur,.. Helper-Jaswinder), a public primary school and a secondary school.

== Sport ==
Kartarpur has an annual youth cricket tournament. There is a gym, a Punjab (Circle) kabbadi. Volleyball and soccer are played.

== Transport ==
Kartarpur has a bus service every half hour to Nurpur Bedi.

== Commerce ==
Kartarpur shops include grocers, stationers, vegetables, barber, public telephone, private doctors, and cycle works.

== Amenities ==
- BSNL telephone exchange
- Government veterinary hospital
- The Kartarpur Agricultural Co-operative Societies Ltd (Ropar Central Co-Operative Bank Ltd.)
- The Kartarpur (Men )Milk Co-operative Societies Ltd
- The Kartarpur (Ladies) Milk Co-operative Societies Ltd.
- Water supply (run by the Punjab government)

== Places of worship ==
The Kali Mata Temple is situated at the end of village. It is the only kali mata mandir in 15 km. There are also Hanuman Mandir, Shiv Mandir, Bhuriwale Kutia and a few Baba Balak Nath and Pir Nigahe Wale Mandirs.
