= Rattan Chand =

Former Indian Bureaucrat

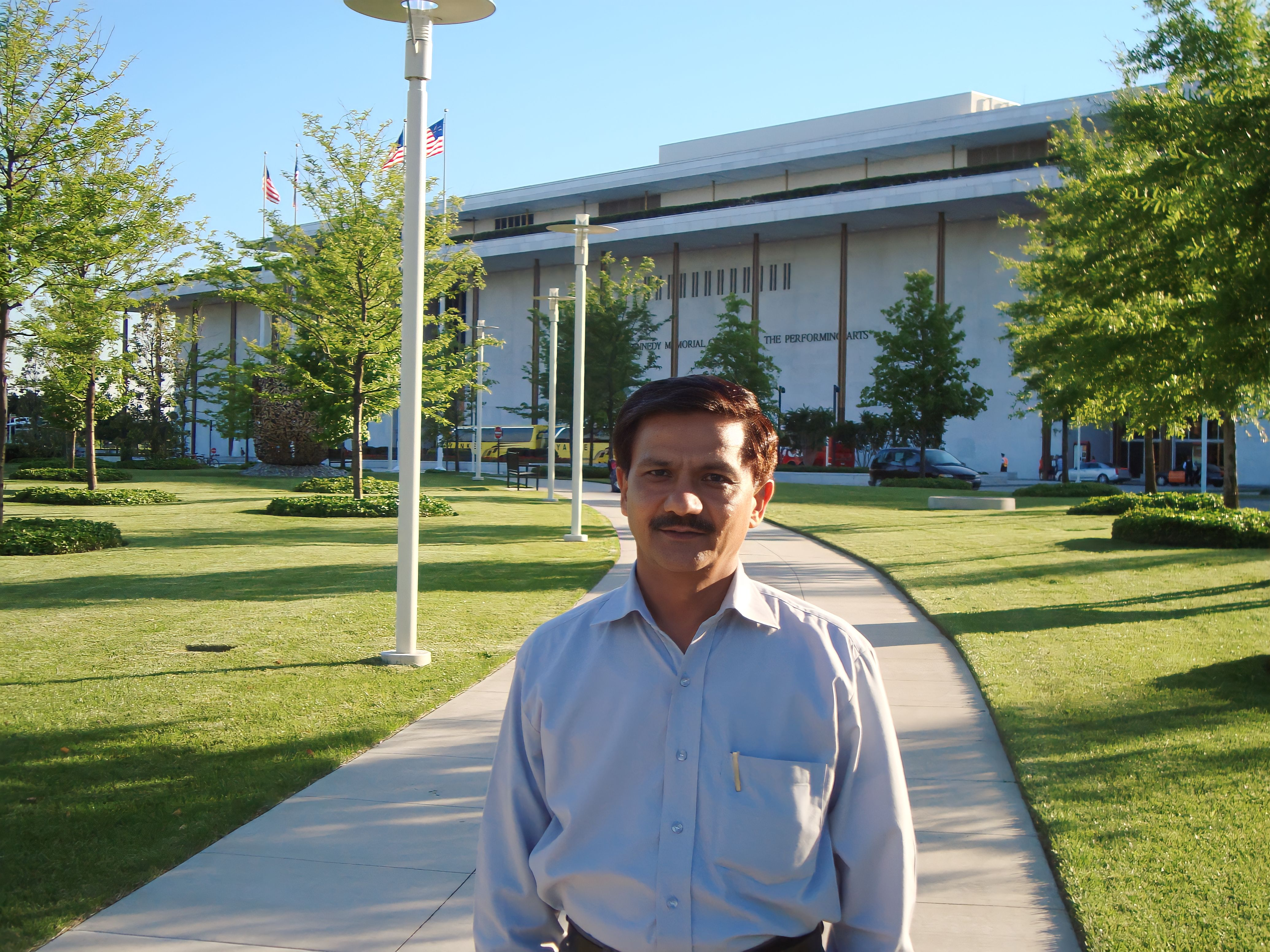
- Dr Rattan Chand at IMF, Washington
- Born: 10 May 1955 (age 71); Bilaspur, Himachal Pradesh, India
- Education: International Institute for Population Sciences; JNU; Punjabi University
- Occupations: retired Bureaucrat, Government of India, Economist
- Years active: 1981-

Rattan Chand (born 10 May 1955) is an Indian Health Economist and retired Indian bureaucrat who has served Government of India at various positions for more than 35 years. Apart from working at senior positions in Government of India he has also been a resource person to USAID, World Bank, International Monetary Fund (IMF), United Nations, World Health Organization, Ministry of Health and Family Welfare Government of India and many other organisations. He has represented Government of India at many International Meetings, Conferences, Working Sessions, Seminars worldwide mainly in the Health Sector. He is a National Monitor, National Health Mission and member of working group of National Statistical Commission, Government of India and senior adviser and expert for World Bank.

== Career ==
Chand has reorganised the ‘Bulletin on Rural Health Statistics’ and updated it regularly. As a senior official in National Sample Survey Organisation, he handled important work of survey of unorganised sector enterprises and drafted the first ever survey report on ‘Informal Sector in India’. For better dissemination of the results, system of organising the National Seminars on survey results was introduced by him. As National Director & Convenor (PNDT) in the Ministry of Health and Family Welfare, he strengthened the programme implementation by involving all major stakeholders. For the first time, an annual report on implementation of Prenatal Diagnosis Techniques (PNDT) Act was prepared and released. A website giving information on the programme and activities undertaken was launched. While working in National Accounts Division, he developed a ‘Guide to Government Budget Analysis and Preparation of Accounts’ for the general government sector. As Joint Secretary and Chief Director, in the Ministry of Health and Family Welfare, under him, a Web based Health Management Information System (HMIS) was developed to increase the flow and use of information at all levels. Also, Annual Health Surveys were introduced under him to track changes in program and impact indicators in the poor performing districts. He contributed significantly to the launch of the fourth round of National Family Health Survey.

Dr Rattan Chand has been one of the key people involved in the National Family Health Surveys conducted by Government of India. While talking to New York Times, Chand said, "This round will provide both district and national level data because of a revamped format. The plan is to conduct such a survey every three years." Chand also said that he wasn't aware why the national survey had been delayed but explained that consultations had been under way for a while to come up with a new redesigned survey. Rattan Chand had also said that the annual healthy survey (AHS) was being scrapped to avoid duplication. "There was no reason to carry multiple surveys to map the same indicators. It was thought to be better to have one comprehensive survey instead of four fragmented ones, the new version of NFHS will not compromise of any indicators that were mapped in other surveys. We have asked the census commissioner to come out with district-level infant, under-5 and maternal mortality once in three years."

As Joint Secretary (AIIMS) in the Ministry of Health and Family Welfare, Chand played a pivotal role in the administration, governance, and nationwide expansion of India's premier medical institutions. Under his tenure, he was instrumental in expediting the Pradhan Mantri Swasthya Suraksha Yojana (PMSSY), streamlining the bureaucratic processes required to set up new AIIMS campuses across various states. He introduced a standardized framework for administrative and financial delegation, bridging the operational gaps between the Ministry and the AIIMS governing bodies.

To modernize institutional functioning, Chand championed the integration of advanced digital management systems within AIIMS New Delhi, ensuring better resource allocation, efficient patient management, and transparent procurement processes. Furthermore, he formed special committees to address faculty shortages and drafted comprehensive guidelines to enhance research funding and international collaborations across all AIIMS institutes.

== Efforts against female foeticide ==
Given the dismal Child Sex Ratio in the country, and the Supreme Court directive of 2003 to State governments to enforce the law banning the use of sex determination technologies, the Ministry set up a National Inspection and Monitoring Committee (NIMC) in October last. Rattan Chand, Director (PNDT) was made the convenor of the NIMC. The NIMC under the guidance of Rattan Chand conducted raids in some of the districts in Maharashtra, Punjab, Haryana, Himachal Pradesh, Delhi and Gujarat. In April, it conducted raids on three clinics in Delhi. In its reports sent to the Chief Secretaries of the respective States, the committee observed that the Authorities had failed to monitor or supervise the registered clinics.

As Director (PNDT) & Convenor of PNDT Act, 1994, Chand raided many hospitals and clinic all over India and shut them down for running illegal Sex determination tests. Rattan Chand said that even if the NIMC conducted raids, it could only send a report to the highest levels in the State Government. It was up to the State authorities to act on it.

== Membership and affiliations ==
- Member, Executive Council, Indian Association for Study of Population
- Member, Working Group, National Statistical Commission, Government of India
- Member, Executive & General Council, International Institute for Population Sciences (IIPS), Mumbai, INDIA
- Member, Technical Advisory Committee, Annual Health Survey (AHS), Government of India
- Member, Technical Advisory Committee, District Level Household Survey (DLHS), Government of India
- Member, Technical Advisory Committee, National Family Health Survey (NFHS), Government of India
- Member, Technical Advisory Committee, Sample Registration System (SRS), Government of India
- Member, Technical Coordination Committee, Health Management information System (HMIS)
- Member, Technical Group on population projections, Government of India
- Member, Working Group on Survey of Health and Morbidity, National Sample Survey Organisation (NSSO), Government of India
- Member, Indian Association for Research in National Income and Wealth
- Former Convenor, National Inspection and Monitoring Committee, Ministry of Health and Family Welfare, Government of India
- Former Member, Governing Body, National Institute of Health & Family Welfare (NIHFW)
- Visiting Faculty, National Academy of Statistical Administration, Greater Noida, India
- Visiting Faculty, National Judicial Academy (India)

== Important publications ==
- ‘Quality of Life approach for identification of the poor’: Journal of Rural development, Vol.19, No.1, January – March 2004. ISSN 0970-3357
- ‘Socio-economic Dimensions of Unemployment in India’, The Indian Journal of Social Development, Vol. 1. no. 2. December 2004. ISSN 0972-3692
- ‘Inequality in Household Consumption in Indian States, 1973-2000’: Indian Journal of Millennium Development Studies, Vol. 1. No.1. March-2006; ISSN 0973-3981
- ‘Incidence of Hunger in India, 1983-2002’. Paper Presented at the National Seminar on the Results of NSS 57th Round Survey Results, March 2004.
- ‘Health Implications of Poverty and Hunger’, Indian Development Review Vol. 3. No. 1, June 2005, ISSN 0972-9437
- ‘An Integrated Summary of the NSS 55th Round Consumer Expenditure Survey Results’, published in ‘Sarvekshana’- Journal of National Sample Survey Organisation, 86th Issue, Vol. XIV, no. 4 and XV, No. 1.ISSN 2249-197X
- ‘An Integrated Summary of the NSS 55th Round Employment-Unemployment Survey Results’, Published in ‘Sarvekshana’ – Journal of National Sample Survey Organisation, 87th Issue, Vol. XV, no. 2&3. ISSN 2249-197X
- ‘Population Change and Demand for Cereals – An Inter-State Analysis 1981-2001’, Jawaharlal Nehru University.
- ‘Fertility and Infant Mortality in Developing Countries – A study of the Relative role of social and economic dimensions of development’,
- ‘Socio-economic Dimensions of Tuberculosis in India’
