= Rupnagar district =

- District of Punjab
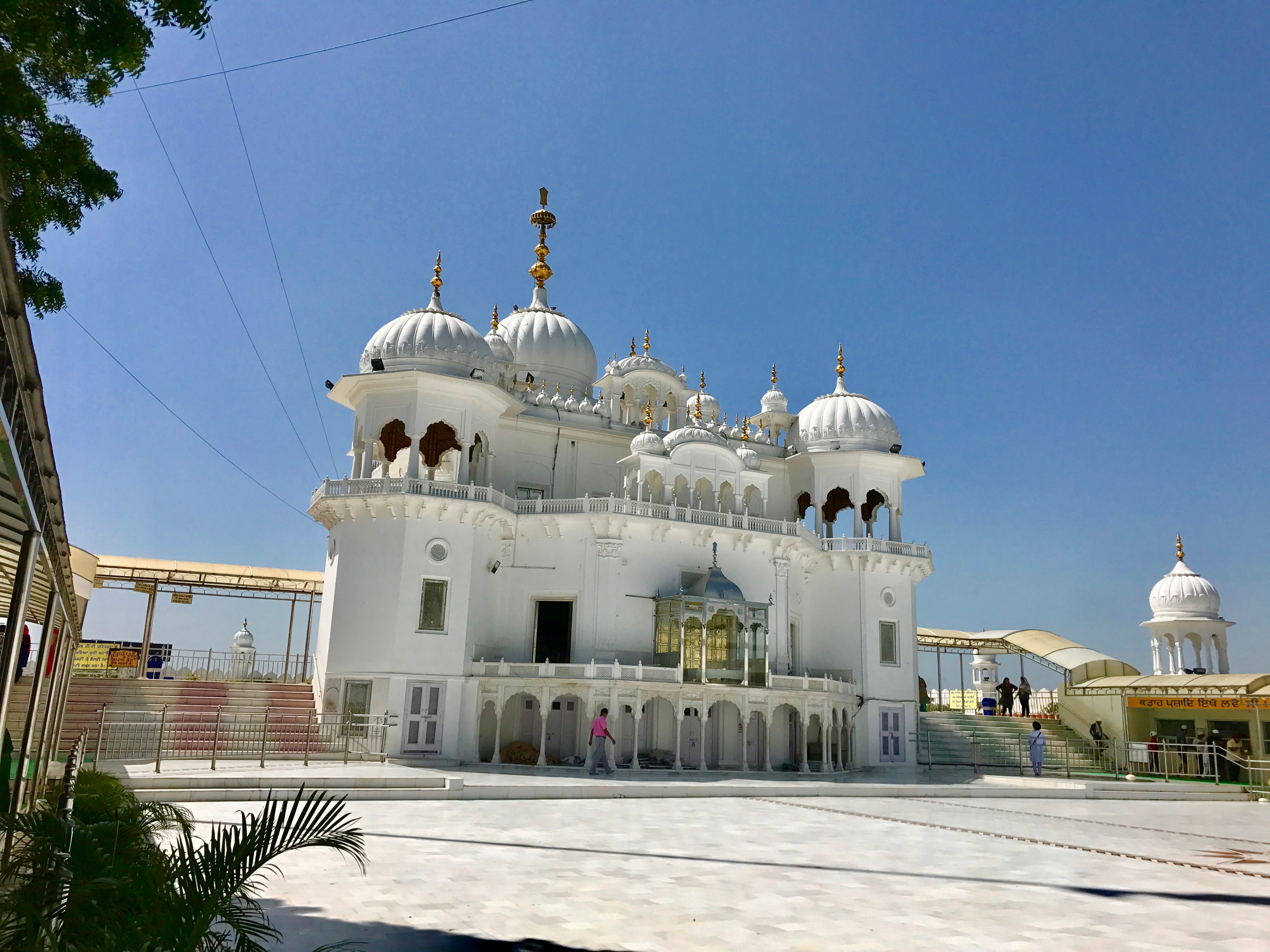
- Takht Shri Kesgarh Sahib

- Location in Punjab
- Coordinates: 30.97°N 76.51°E
- Country: India
- State: Punjab
- Named for: Raja Rokeshar's son, Rup Sen
- Headquarters: Rupnagar

Area
  - Total: 1,440 km^{2} (560 sq mi)

Population (2011)
  - Total: 684,627
  - Density: 475/km^{2} (1,230/sq mi)

Languages
  - Official: Punjabi; Hindi
  - Regional: Puadhi
- Time zone: UTC+5:30 (IST)
- ISO 3166 code: IN-PB-RU
- Literacy: 82.19%
- Website: rupnagar.nic.in

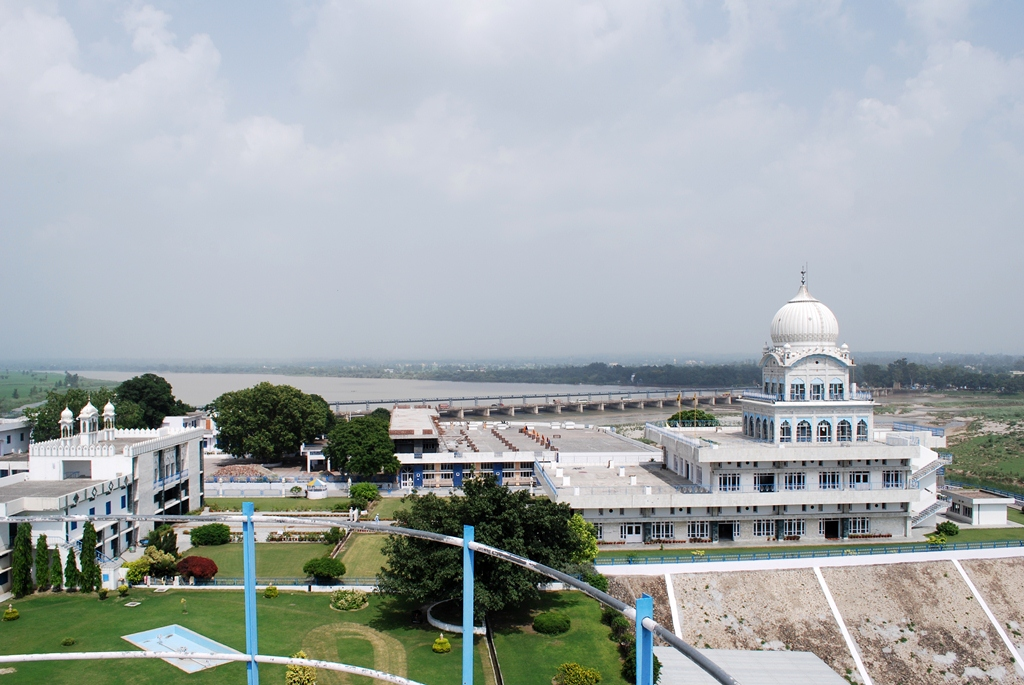
Gurdwara Shri Tibi Sahib on the banks of river Sutlej

Rupnagar district, also known as Ropar district, is one of twenty-three districts in the state of Punjab, India. The city of Rupnagar is said to have been founded by a Raja called Rokeshar, who ruled during the 11th century and named it after his son Rup Sen. It is also the site of an ancient town of the Indus Valley civilization. The major cities in Rupnagar District are Morinda, Nangal and Anandpur Sahib. The district is part of the Ropar division.

Morinda is also known as Baghwāla "[The City] of Gardens." Morinda is located on the Chandigarh-Ludhiana Highway. The Nangal dam, part of Bhakra Dam in Himachal Pradesh, lies in the border of Rupnagar district and Bilaspur district of Himachal Pradesh. Dadhi is one of the most important villages of the district, particularly because of Gurudwara Sri Hargobindsar Sahib. It is bordered by Bilaspur, Una and Solan districts of Himachal Pradesh and Hoshiarpur, Mohali, Ludhiana, Fategarh Sahib and Shahid Bhagat Singh Nagar districts of Punjab.

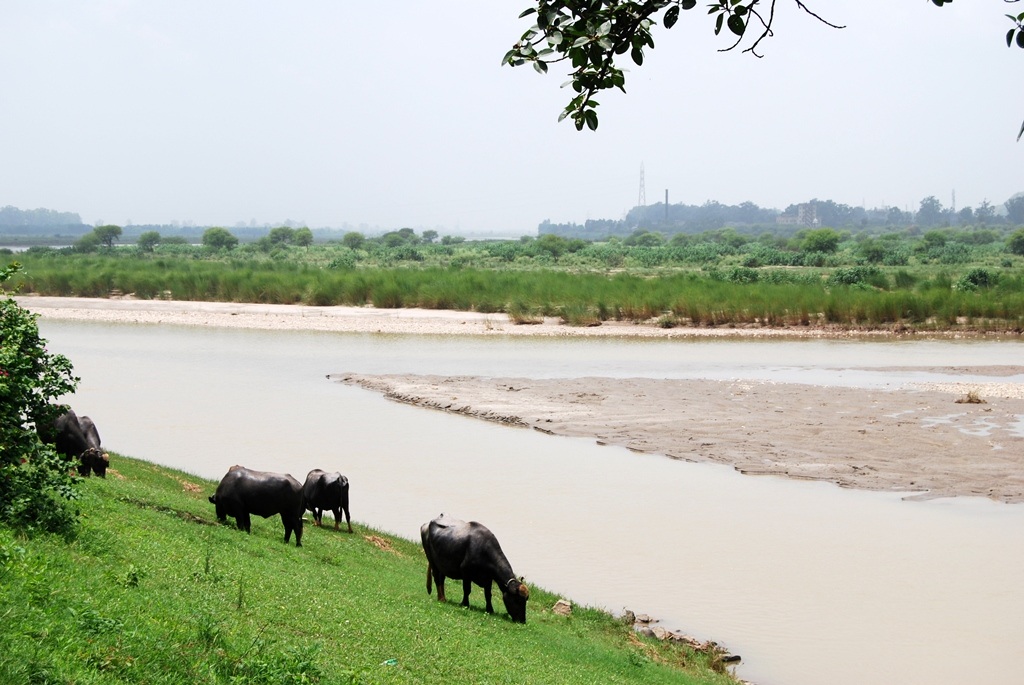
Cattle grazing on the banks of river Sutlej

== Location ==
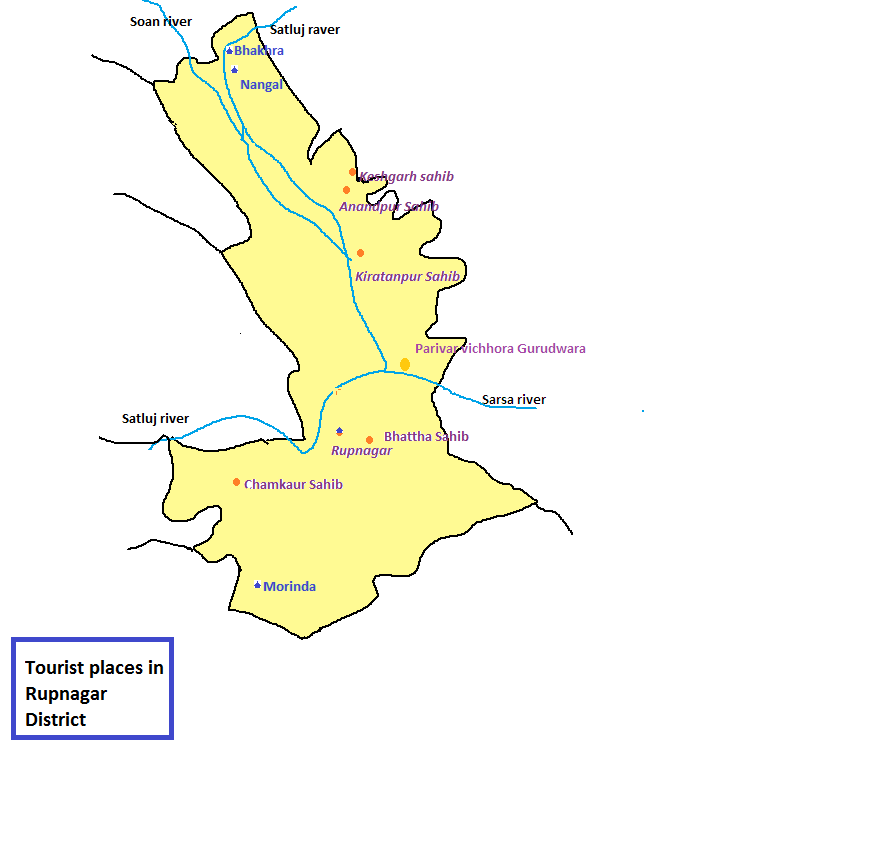
Tourist places in District Rupnagar

Rupnagar district, included in the Patiala Division of Punjab falls between north latitude 30°-32' and 31°-24' and east longitude 76°-18' and 76°-55'. Rupnagar (formerly known as Ropar) town, the district headquarters is 42 km from Chandigarh, the state capital. The district adjoins Shahid Bhagat Singh Nagar (formerly known as Nawanshahar), Mohali and Fatehgarh Sahib Districts of Punjab.

The district comprises four Tehsils, Rupnagar, Anandpur Sahib, Chamkaur Sahib and Nangal, and includes 617 villages and 7 towns, namely Rupnagar, Chamkaur Sahib, Anandpur Sahib, Morinda, Kiratpur Sahib and Nangal, Bela. All the towns except Chamkaur sahib fall on the railway line. The Satluj river passes close (2 to 5 km) to the towns of Nangal, Rupnagar, Bela and Anandpur Sahib. Rupnagar falls in Puadh region except it's nurpur bedi sub-tehsil which is geographically in Doaba region of Punjab.

== Climate ==
The climate of Rupnagar District is characterized by its general dryness (except in the south-west monsoon season), hot summer, and bracingly cold winter. The year may be divided into four seasons. The period from about the middle of November to February is the cold season. This is followed by the summer season from March to about the end of June. The south-west monsoon season commences late in June and continues up to about the middle of September.

The period from mid-September to the middle of November constitute the post-monsoon or transition season. The temperature ranges from a minimum of 4 °C in winter to 45 °C in summer. May and June are generally hottest months and December and January are the coldest months.

The relative humidity is high, averaging about 70 percent during monsoon. The average annual rainfall in the district is 775.6 mm. About 78 percent of the annual rainfall is received during the period from June to September. The soils of the District vary in texture generally from loam to silty clay loam except along the Sutlej River and where some sandy patches may be found. Chamkaur Sahib and Kharar blocks have sodic soils. The soils of Anandpur Sahib and Rupnagar blocks are undulating.

== Politics ==
No.	Constituency	Name of MLA	Party	Bench
49	Anandpur Sahib	Harjot Singh Bains	Aam Aadmi Party	Government
50	Rupnagar	Dinesh Chadha	Aam Aadmi Party	Government
51	Chamkaur Sahib (SC)	Dr Charanjit Singh	Aam Aadmi Party	Government

== Administration ==
The district comprises the following tehsils:

- Anandpur Sahib
- Chamkaur Sahib
- Nangal
- Rupnagar
- Morinda

=== Subdistricts of Rupnagar district ===
According to the Indian government's integrated online directory, Rupnagar district is divided into the following subdistricts (tehsils/subdivisions) and blocks:

- Subdistricts
  1. Anandpur Sahib
  2. Chamkaur Sahib
  3. Morinda
  4. Nangal
  5. Rup Nagar
- Blocks:
  1. Anandpur Sahib
  2. Chamkaur Sahib
  3. Morinda
  4. Nangal
  5. Nurpur Bedi
  6. Rupnagar

== Cities and towns ==
- Anandpur Sahib
- Chamkaur Sahib
- Kiratpur Sahib
- Morinda
- Nangal
- Rupnagar
- Kamalpur
- Ghanauli
- Dadhi

Nurpur bedi

- Bharatgarh
- Kartarpur
- Bara, Punjab - A Famous Archelogical Site Village In Rupnagar District

== Demographics ==
Historical population
Year	Pop.	±% p.a.
1901	220,055	—
1911	190,585	−1.43%
1921	189,159	−0.08%
1931	207,804	+0.94%
1941	236,725	+1.31%
1951	251,804	+0.62%
1961	319,389	+2.41%
1971	357,783	+1.14%
1981	439,165	+2.07%
1991	535,970	+2.01%
2001	628,846	+1.61%
2011	684,627	+0.85%

According to the 2011 census Rupnagar district has a population of 684,627, roughly equal to the nation of Equatorial Guinea or the US state of North Dakota. This gives it a ranking of 507th in India (out of a total of 640). The district has a population density of 488 inhabitants per square kilometre (1,260/sq mi) . Its population growth rate over the decade 2001-2011 was 8.67%. Rupnagar has a sex ratio of 913 females for every 1000 males, and a literacy rate of 83.3%. Scheduled Castes made up 26.42% of the population.

=== Gender ===
The table below shows the sex ratio of Ludhiana district through decades.

Sex ratio of Ludhiana district
Census year	Ratio
2011	915
2001	889
1991	870
1981	862
1971	854
1961	812
1951	812
1941	802
1931	789
1921	781
1911	756
1901	807

The table below shows the child sex ratio of children below the age of 6 years in the rural and urban areas of Rupnagar district.

Child sex ratio of children below the age of 6 years in Rupnagar district
Year	Urban	Rural
2011	874	859
2001	799	893

=== Religions ===
Religion in Rupnagar district (2011)
Religion	Percent
Sikhism	52.74%
Hinduism	44.47%
Islam	2.12%
Other or not stated	0.67%

The table below shows the population of different religions in absolute numbers in the urban and rural areas of Rupnagar district.

Religion in tehsils of Rupnagar district (2011)
Tehsil	Sikhism (%)	Hinduism (%)	Islam (%)	Others (%)
Anandpur Sahib	41.41	56.61	1.43	0.55
Nangal	18.39	79.66	1.52	0.43
Rupnagar	61.70	34.14	3.14	1.02
Chamkaur Sahib	82.19	14.89	2.27	0.65

Absolute numbers of different religious groups in Rupnagar district
Religion	Urban (2011)	Rural (2011)	Urban (2001)	Rural (2001)	Urban (1991)	Rural (1991)
Hindu	1,04,449	2,00,032	1,87,670	2,64,749	94,225	2,05,743
Sikh	67,713	2,93,332	1,65,202	4,70,449	57,013	3,48,477
Muslim	3,357	11,135	5,641	16,959	734	6,923
Christian	1,260	834	2,388	1,046	777	504
Other religions	1,028	1,487	1,506	498	2,089	377

=== Languages ===
Languages of Rupnagar district (2011)
1. Punjabi (92.6%)
2. Hindi (6.55%)
3. Others (0.82%)

== Health ==
The table below shows the data from the district nutrition profile of children below the age of 5 years, in Rupnagar, as of year 2020.

District nutrition profile of children under 5 years of age in Rupnagar, year 2020
Indicators	Number of children (<5 years)	Percent (2020)	Percent (2016)
Stunted	7,659	15%	19%
Wasted	4,611	9%	14%
Severely wasted	1,634	3%	4%
Underweight	7,776	15%	20%
Overweight/obesity	1,283	3%	0%
Anemia	29,949	66%	70%
Total children	50,893		

The table below shows the district nutrition profile of Rupnagar of women between the ages of 15 and 49 years, as of year 2020.

District nutritional profile of Rupnagar of women of 15–49 years, in 2020
Indicators	Number of women (15–49 years)	Percent (2020)	Percent (2016)
Underweight (BMI <18.5 kg/m^2)	29,743	13%	13%
Overweight/obesity	100,391	45%	44%
Hypertension	60,217	27%	16%
Diabetes	43,098	19%	NA
Anemia (non-preg)	142,625	64%	75%
Total women (preg)	10,899		
Total women	221,468		

The table below shows the current use of family planning methods by currently married women between the ages of 15 and 49 years, in Rupnagar district.

Family planning methods used by women between the ages of 15 and 49 years, in Rupnagar district
Method	Total (2019–21)	Total (2015–16)
Female sterilization	25.6%	30.3%
Male sterilization	0.3%	0.8%
IUD/PPIUD	1.8%	3.3%
Pill	1.3%	2.6%
Condom	20.5%	24.3%
Injectables	0.0%	0.1%
Any modern method	49.8%	61.5%
Any method	71.8%	75.0%
Total unmet need	10.8%	10.7%
Unmet need for spacing	3.5%	2.6%

The table below shows the number of road accidents and people affected in Rupnagar district by year.

Road accidents and people affected in Rupnagar district by year
Year	Accidents	Killed	Injured	Vehicles Involved
2022	309	238	172	238
2021	263	193	158	268
2020	182	127	118	249
2019	251	181	170	291

== Notable people ==
- Kanshi Ram, founder of Bahujan Samaj Party
- Surjit Bindrakhia, a famous punjabi singer
- Augustine George Masih, Former Chief Justice Of Rajasthan High Court

== Gallery ==
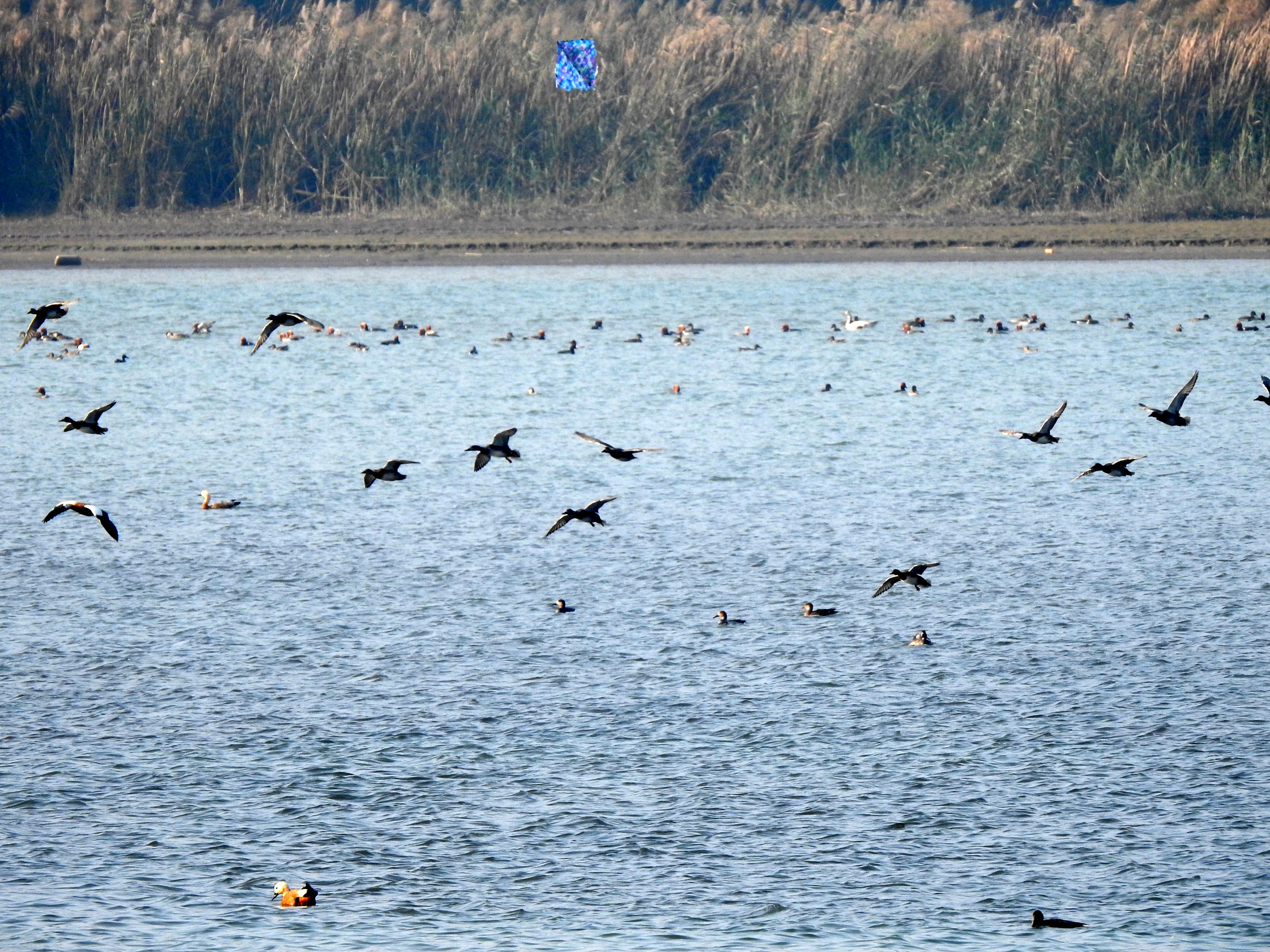
Migratory birds at Ropar Wetland

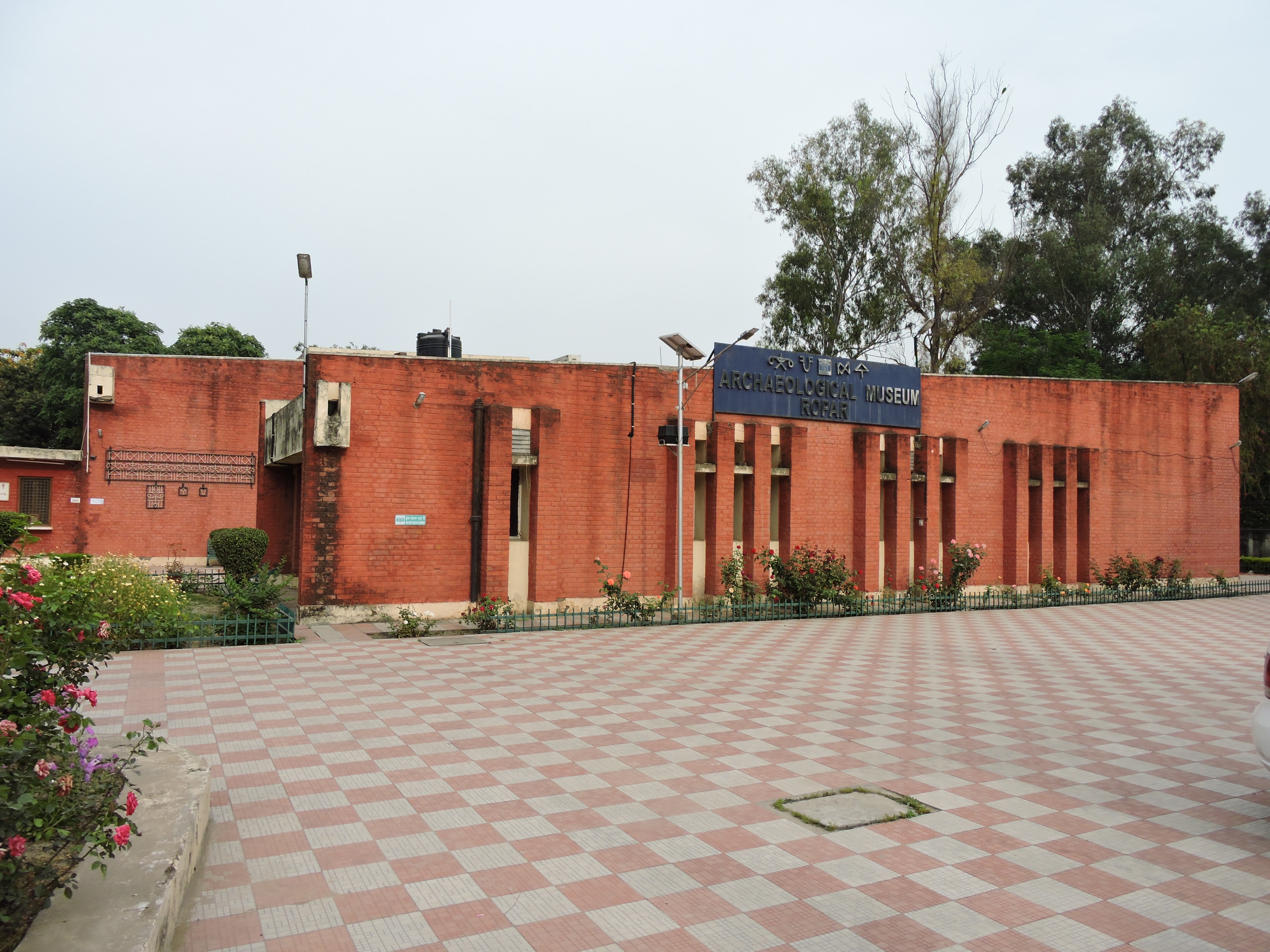
Archaeological Museum, Rupnagar, Punjab

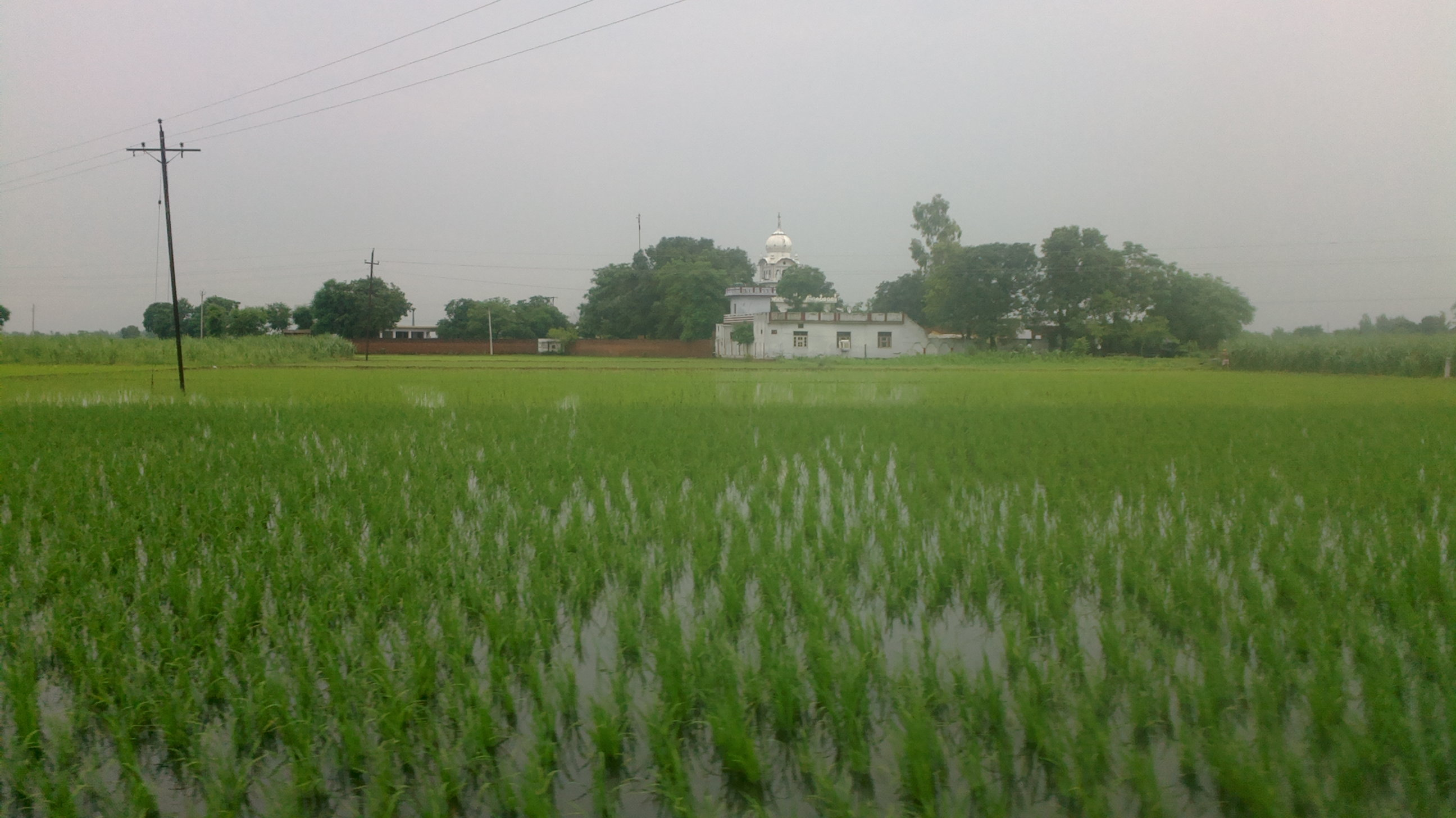
Rupnagar, Punjab, India

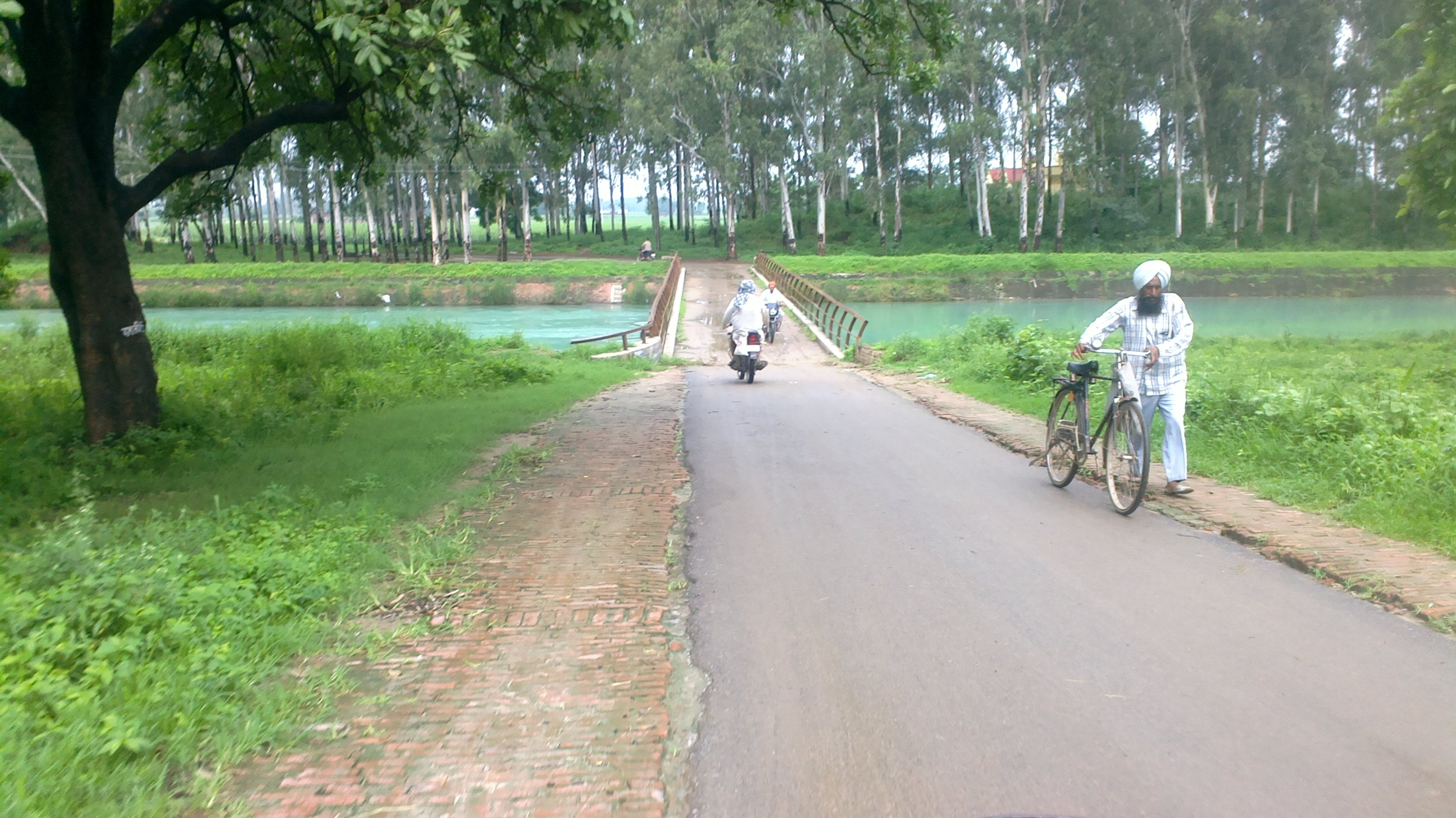
Rupnagar, Punjab, India
