= Chhat =

Village of high status in the Punjab

In some areas of eastern Punjab, primarily in the sub-montane districts, the Rajputs inhabited villages, known as Chhat, that were of the highest caliber. The word "Chhat" is explained as an abbreviation of "chhatar makan", equivalent to the English word crown. A chhat is a village which enjoys a pre-eminence over, or is held in special veneration by, the other villages of the biradari. It is generally called simply chhat. Whereas, a makan is a village of lower status than a chhat. A person must execute a meritorious deed for a village to be granted the title of makan.

Hence, Makan is also a famous place, not an ordinary village.

When a daughter gets married, the member of a chhat always gives twice as much to the mirasis as the member of a makan.
