= Sector 61, Mohali =

Sector 61
- Sector
- Location in Punjab, India
- Coordinates: 30.7015034°N 76.7290437°E
- Country: India
- State: Punjab
- District: Ajitgarh

Languages
  - Official: Punjabi
- Time zone: UTC+5:30 (IST)
- PIN: 160061
- Telephone code: 0172
- Vehicle registration: PB 65

Sector 61 (commonly known as Phase 7) is residential sector located in Chandigarh, Punjab. It is covered with Sector 70, Mohali, Sector 71, Mohali, 3B2, Sector 62, Mohali and Sector 52, Chandigarh.

== Facilities ==
=== Banks ===
- HDFC Bank
- Punjab National Bank
- Canara Bank
- State Bank of Patiala
- State Bank of India
- ICICI Bank
- Axis bank

=== Healthcare facilities ===
- Government Dispensary
- JP Eye Hospital
- Chawala Nursing Home
- Kochar Nursing Home
- Gopal Nursing Home

=== Educational institutions ===
- St. Soldier School
- Sant Isher Singh Public School
- Small Wonder School
- Punjabi University Regional Centre for Information Technology and Management
- ICAI Institute
- Raj Institute Of Competitions

=== Religious institutions ===
- Gurdwara Bhagat Ravidas Ji
- Brahmkumaris
- Sanatan Dharma Temple
- Gurdwara Bibi Bhani

== Access ==
Sector 61 is situated on Sarovar Path. It is well connected with road, rail and air. The nearest airports are Chandigarh Airport and the nearest railway station is SAS Nagar Mohali railway station. It is entry point from all sides of Punjab towards Mohali Bus Stand. A few CTU local buses also available connecting PGI (Mohali)|PGI and Landran.
