= Chandigarh Capital Region =

Area in India

Chandigarh Capital Region CCR
- Metropolitan Area
- Chandigarh Metropolitan Region
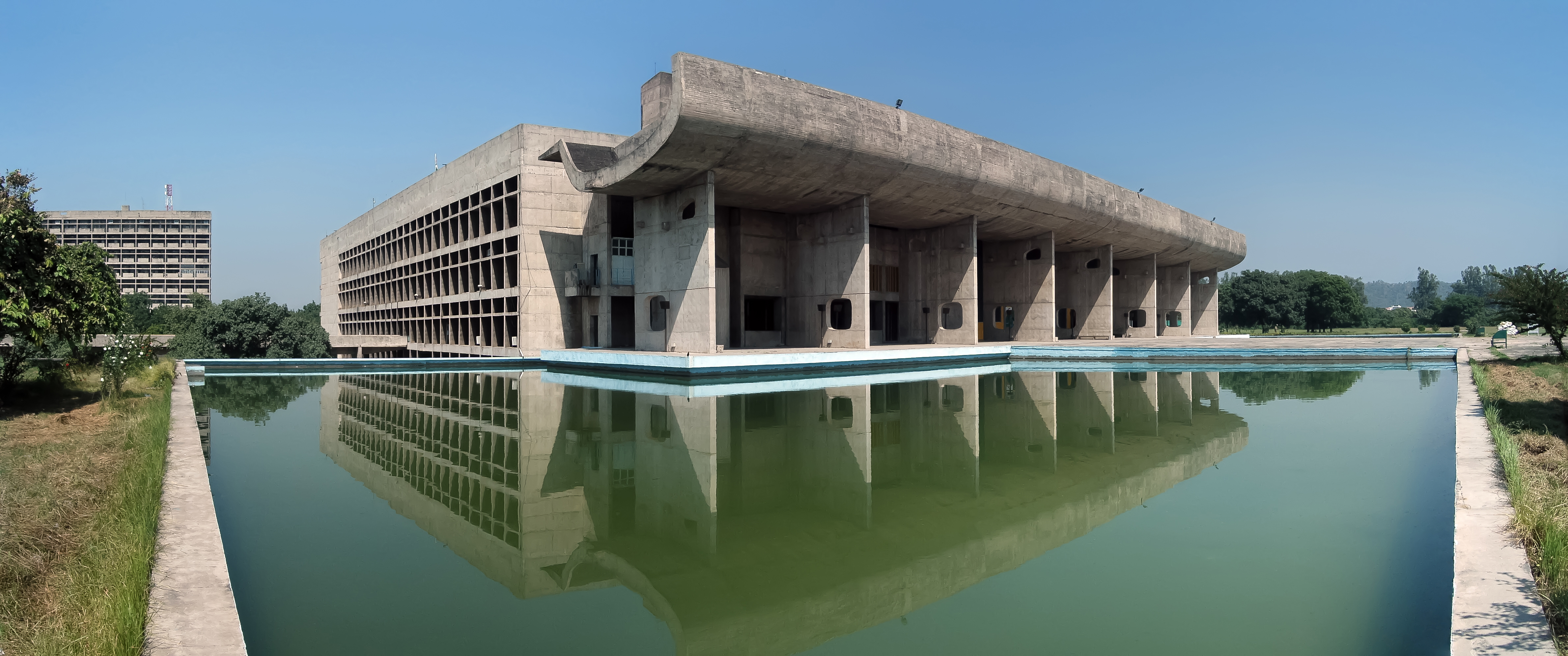
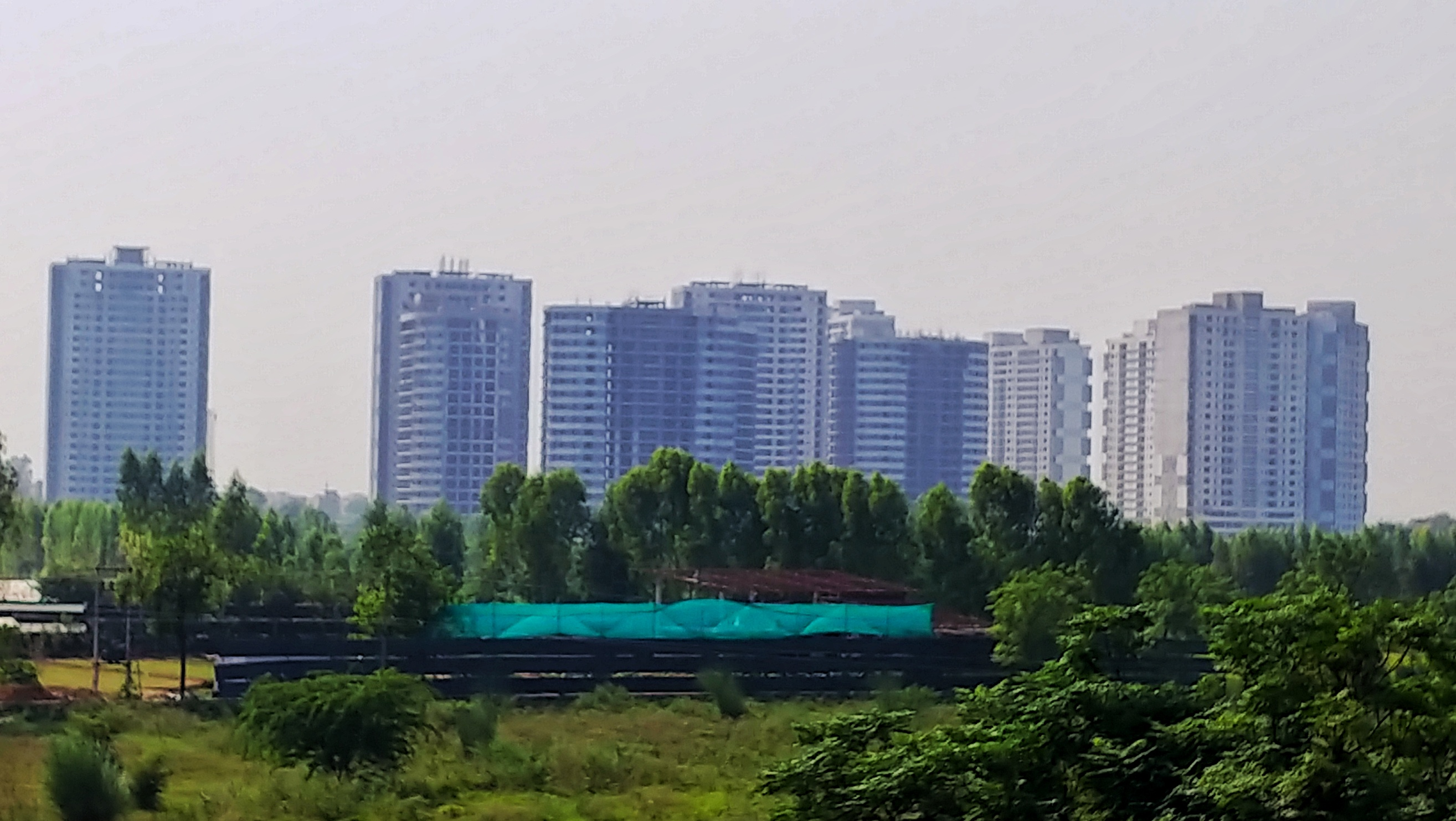
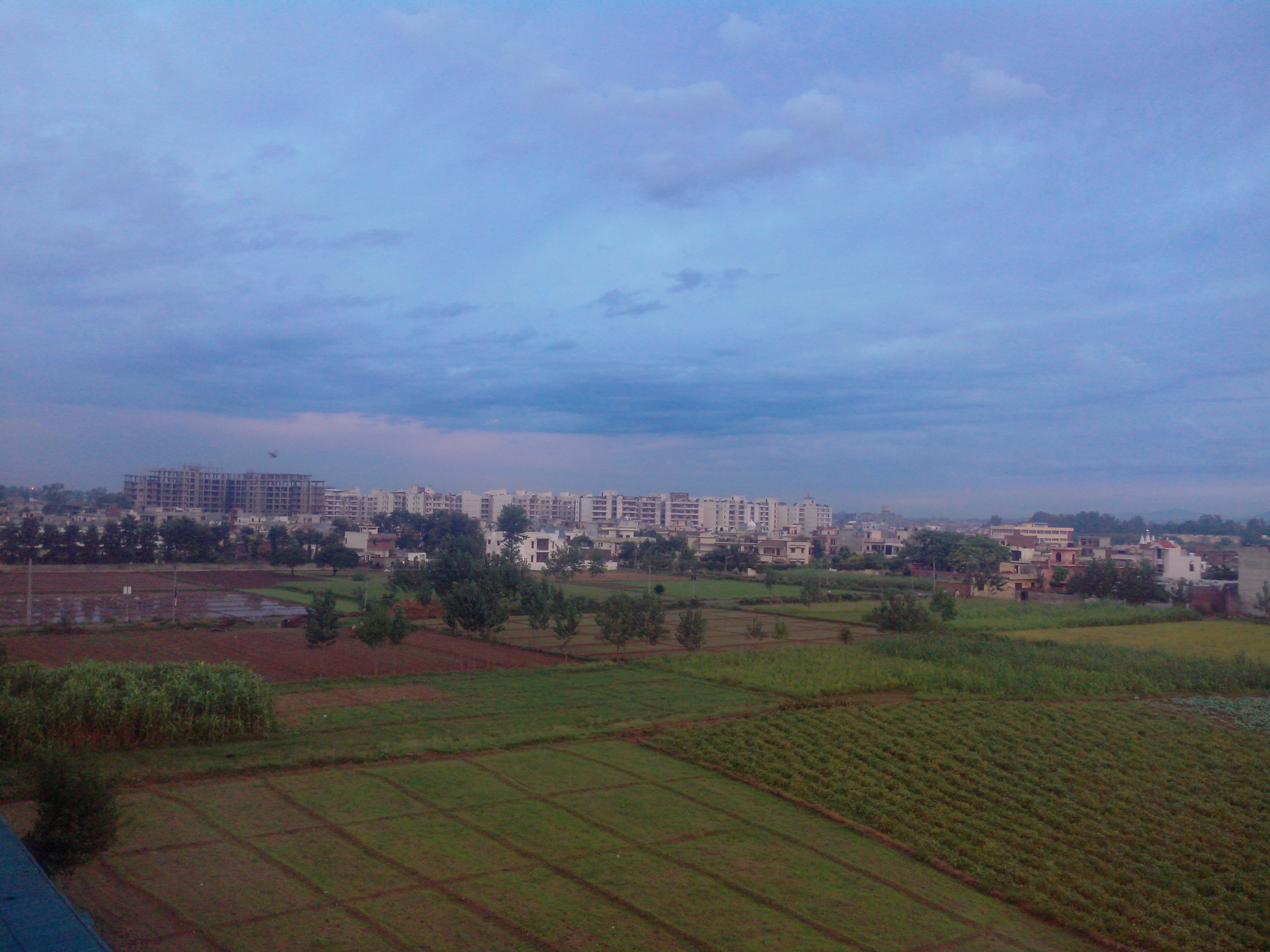
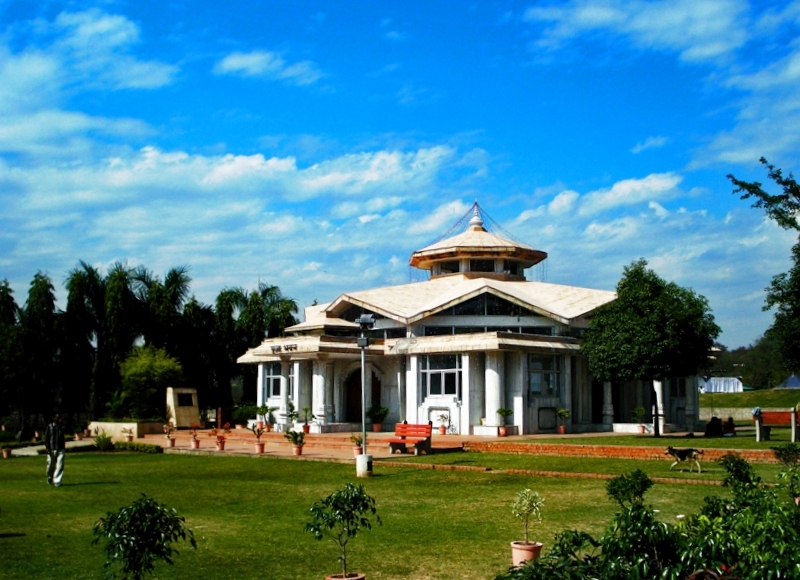
- Chandigarh, the core of the CCR New Chandigarh Zirakpur Panchkula
- Interactive map of Chandigarh Capital Region
- Coordinates: 30.7198°N 76.7798°E
- Country: India
- States: Punjab; Haryana; Himachal Pradesh
- Union territory: Chandigarh
- Created: 1984
- Major cities: Chandigarh, Mohali, Panchkula, New Chandigarh, Mullanpur Garibdass, Kharar, Zirakpur, Pinjore, Kalka

Government
  - Body: Chandigarh Administration, Greater Mohali Area Development Authority and Haryana Urban Development Authority

Population (2011)
  - Total: 1,611,450

Languages
  - Official: Hindi; English (Note: The UT is part of Group B region in Official Language Rules, 1976 which uses both English and Hindi for official communication. No official language regulation exists for the UT.); Punjabi
  - Regional: Hindi; Puadhi; Baghati
- Time zone: UTC+05:30 (IST)

A map of Chandigarh, Mohali, Panchkula and Zirakpur together.

Chandigarh Capital Region (CCR) or Chandigarh Metropolitan Region (CMR) is an area, which includes the union territory city of Chandigarh, and its neighboring cities of Mohali, Kharar, Zirakpur, New Chandigarh (in Punjab) and Panchkula, Pinjore, Kalka, Barwala (in Haryana). Chandigarh Administration, Greater Mohali Area Development Authority (GMADA) and Haryana Urban Development Authority (HUDA) are different authorities responsible for development of this region. Baddi, an industrial town in nearby Himachal Pradesh, is also adjacent.

The economy of the region is interdependent as the area is continuously inhabited, though falling under different states. There is a lot of movement of people and goods daily to and from suburbs, like most of the people working in Chandigarh live in a suburb like Zirakpur. The local industry is on the outskirts like Derabassi, Lalru and Baddi. The vast majority of skilled workers in the private sector come from neighboring states like Himachal Pradesh, Punjab, and Haryana.

== History ==
The Indian Ministry of Home Affairs asked the Chandigarh Administration in October 2011 to "coordinate with the Punjab and Haryana governments for working out the modalities" of a Regional Planning Board (RPB) for the Chandigarh Capital Region (CCR). The intention was to harmonize and improve facilities across the region and coordinate local administrations. Responsibilities of the RPB would include disaster management, health planning, biomedical waste and traffic management.

The 'Master Plan 2031' submitted to the UT administrator in January 2013 included a proposal for a "inter-state regional plan for the Chandigarh Capital Region". However the final plan confined itself to the UT boundary, and did not mention the proposed "Chandigarh Capital Region". Instead, the plan expected responsibilities for the region to be coordinated between Punjab, Haryana and Chandigarh UT, and that the Chandigarh plan "with the GMADA Plan 2056 and the Haryana Development Plan should together arrive at a metropolitan plan".

== Definition ==
The cities, towns and areas that would be part of the Chandigarh Capital region are:

Rank	City	Union territory/State
1	Chandigarh	Chandigarh
2	Mohali	Punjab
3	Panchkula	Haryana
4	Kharar	Punjab
5	Zirakpur	Punjab

Mohali District (Punjab) and Panchkula District (Haryana) are part of the CCR. Derabassi, Lalru, Banur and Kurali in Mohali district & Barwala and Raipur Rani in the Panchkula district can be considered another town in Chandigarh Capital Region.

== Demographics ==
Historical population
Year	Pop.	±%
1961	219,881	—
1971	357,251	+62.5%
1981	605,610	+69.5%
1991	816,409	+34.8%
2001	1,230,337	+50.7%
2011	1,611,348	+31.0%
2024	1,955,141	+21.3%

As of 2011 India census, Chandigarh capital region had a population of 1,611,450. Males constitute 55% of the population and females 45%. The sex ratio is 818 females for every 1,000 males. The child-sex ratio is 880 females per thousand males. Chandigarh has an effective literacy rate of 86.77% (based on population 7 years and above), higher than the national average; with male literacy of 90.81% and female literacy of 81.88%. 10.8% of the population is under 6 years of age. The population of Chandigarh formed 0.12 per cent of India in 2011.

== Industry ==
Chandigarh IT Park is a technology park located within Chandigarh, with presence of companies like Airtel, Tech Mahindra and Infosys.Mohali IT City is the infrastructure to facilitate information technology in the city. It spreads over 690 ha (1,700 acres) developed by GMADA situated near Chandigarh International Airport. Infosys is given 20 ha (49 acres) of land to develop state of art campus. Quark has 16 ha (40 acres) campus in Mohali for Quark software Inc. and other IT Companies like Emerson and Infosys.Swaraj Tractors has Three Assembly Plants, one Engine Plant and one Foundry shop in Mohali District.CLAAS, German MNC has its Plant near Morinda in Mohali District.SML ISUZU has truck Plant near Ropar.Verka and Sun Pharma also have Plants in Mohali.Dera Bassi - Lalru is another belt with mostly medium industry, this place has many spinning mills including the Nahar group. Bhushan Steel also has a presence here.Panchkula IT Park is the state of art infrastructure to facilitate information technology in the city. It spreads over 30 ha (74 acres) developed by HSIIDC situated in sector 22. Bharat Electronics has a factory in Panchkula.Hindustan Machine Tools has a tractor factory in Pinjore, while Associated Cement Companies has a cement factory in Pinjore.This region is the zonal headquarters for a large number of banks, their offices are mainly in the "Bank Square" in sector 17 Chandigarh. This area also houses the regional office (usually covering Punjab, Northern Haryana, Himachal Pradesh and Jammu and Kashmir) for a lot of FMCG companies.

== Healthcare infrastructure ==
The prominent hospitals in the region are

- Dr. B.R. Ambedkar State Institute of Medical Sciences, Sector 56, Mohali
- Fortis Hospital, Sector 62, Mohali
- Postgraduate Institute of Medical Education and Research PGIMER, Sector 12, Chandigarh

== Educational institutes ==
=== Schools ===
- Carmel Convent School
- Government Model Senior Secondary School, Sector-16, Chandigarh
- St. John's High School, Chandigarh

=== Colleges and universities ===
- Chandigarh
  - Central Scientific Instruments Organisation (CSIO)
  - Chandigarh College of Architecture (CCA)
  - Government Medical College and Hospital, Chandigarh (GMCH)
  - Institute of Microbial Technology (IMTECH)
  - National Institute of Electronics & Information Technology (NIEIT) Chandigarh campus
  - Panjab University, government university
  - Postgraduate Institute of Medical Education and Research (PGIMER)
  - Punjab Engineering College (PEC)
  - Terminal Ballistics Research Laboratory (|TBRL-DRDO Chandigarh)
- Mohali
  - Army Institute of Law
  - C-DAC Mohali
  - Chandigarh University, private university
  - Indian Institute of Science Education and Research, Mohali (IISER Mohali)
  - Indian School of Business (ISB) Mohali campus
  - Institute of Nano Science and Technology (INST)
  - National Institutes of Pharmaceutical Education and Research (NIPER)
  - Northern India Institute of Fashion Technology (NIIFT Mohali)
- New Chandigarh
  - Homi Bhabha Cancer Hospital & Research Centre (Tata Memorial Center) New Chandigarh campur
- Panchkula
  - AIIMS AYUSH Panchkula campus
  - National Institute of Fashion Technology (NIFT) Panchkula campus
- Rupnagar
  - Indian Institute of Technology Rupnagar (IIT, Rupnagar Indian)
  - National Institute of Electronics & Information Technology (NIEIT) Rupnagar campus

== Sports ==
- Inderjit Singh Bindra Stadium, Mohali
- Maharaja Yadavindra Singh International Cricket Stadium, New Chandigarh
- Mohali International Hockey Stadium Mohali
- Chandigarh Hockey Stadium Sec42 Chandigarh
- Tau Devi Lal Cricket Stadium, Sector 3 Panchkula

== Transport ==
- Air transport
  - Shaheed Bhagat Singh International Airport, near Aerocity in Mohali, has both domestic and international flights.
- Rail transport - long-distance trains:
  - Chandigarh Railway Station
  - Chandi Mandir railway station, in Punchkula city
  - Mohali Railway Station
- Road transport: There are following Inter-State Bus Terminals (ISBT) for the long distance buses:
  - ISBT, SEC-17, Chandigarh
  - ISBT, SEC-43, Chandigarh
  - ISBT, SEC-57, Mohali
  - ISBT, SEC-5, Panchkula
