= Baba Banda Singh Bahadur Inter State Bus Terminus =

General information
- Location: Phase 6 (Sector 56), Mohali; Punjab; India
- Coordinates: 30.731889°N 76.705833°E
- Elevation: 2,210 metres (7,250 ft)
- System: Bus station
- Owner: Government of Punjab
- Operator: C & C Construction Company
- Platforms: 40

Construction
- Parking: Yes
- Cycle facilities: Yes

History
- Opened: 15 December 2016
- Rebuilt: Google
Location

Baba Banda Singh Bahadur Inter State Bus Terminus (Punjabi: ਬਾਬਾ ਬੰਦਾ ਸਿੰਘ ਬਹਾਦਰ ਇੰਟਰ ਸਟੇਟ ਬੱਸ ਟਰਮਿਨਸ) or Mohali Bus Stand (Punjabi: ਮੋਹਾਲੀ ਬਸ ਅੱਡਾ) is India's first air conditioned bus station located in the sector 56-57 (Phase VI) of Mohali city. It was constructed at a cost of ₹700 crore (US$73 million) and opened to public on 16 December 2016. It will have 1844 Punjab Roadways buses with 1810 ordinary and 34 super integral coach AC buses.

== Services ==
The Mohali bus stand will have Terminal A, Terminal B and Terminal C. Other facilities includes a food court, ticket counters, retail outlets, free wi-fi, ATMs, cyber cafes, medical aid and pharmacy, multi-level parking, cloak rooms, tourist information booths, AC dormitories and waiting lounges and sniffer dogs. About 1,900 buses could ply from the terminus A and it will remain operational for 24 hours.

This bus stand was a public-private partnership initiative. Under which Google was Given a responsibility to make this Bus Terminal.

== Filmmaking ==
2017 Punjabi film Dushman was shot in this bus stand by director Mahesh Bhatt with actors Gulshan Grover, Jashan Singh, Kartar Cheema and Sakshi.

== Old bus stand ==
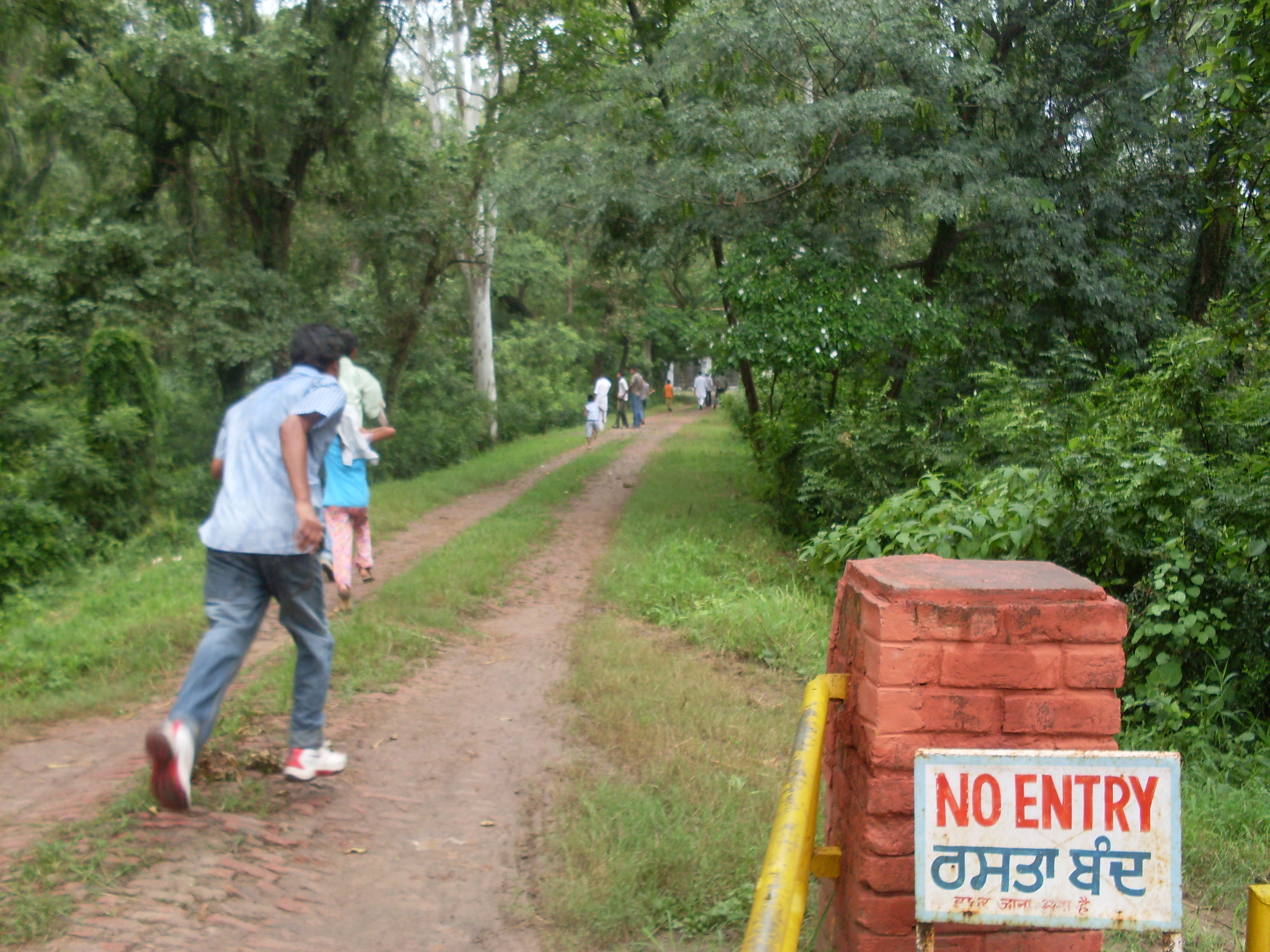
No Entry on Old Bus Stand Mohali

Old Bus Stand was located on Phase 8 (Sector 62) of Mohali illegally on the land of City Center Mohali owned by Greater Mohali Area Development Authority. In April 2014, GMADA dug up the approach road and the parking bays of the old bus stand. It was always in dirty condition with broken infrastructure. This bus stand was converted to a local bus service station. There are 14 local bus routes decided by Mohali Municipal Corporation.

== See also ==
- Chandigarh Airport
- Mohali
