= N Choe =

N-Choe stream
- Location within Punjab Location within India
- Nicknames: Naalaa; Stadium Wala Naalaa; Ataawa choe

Physical characteristics
- Mouth
  - coordinates: 30.7245435°N 76.7342077°E

The N-Choe is a seasonal stream (the word "choe" means stream in Punjabi) that originates in Chandigarh, India and runs across the Leisure Valley to Kajheri, Mohali (now known as Sahibzada Ajit Singh Nagar) Punjab, India, and later merges into the Ghaggar River. The stream runs across Leisure Valley and the PCA Cricket Stadium. It is one of the seasonal rivulets in Chandigarh, which include Sukhna Choe in the East and Patiala Ki Rao in the West. The Choe Nala originates at sector 29 in Chandigarh, Punjab.

It is known as Ataawa choe among locals.

== Route ==
=== Chandigarh ===
The N-choe originates near the Punjab Civil Secretariat in Sector 1, Chandigarh. It then flows through Bougainvillea Park in Sector 3, Leisure Valley Park in Sector 10, Rose Garden and Shanti Kunj Garden in Sector 16. Finally, it passes through Sectors 23, 36, 42, and 53, before reaching its confluence point near village Kajheri in Sector 52 and Burail Jail in Sector 51

=== Mohali ===
From sector 51 in Chandigarh, N Choe enters Mohali and goes through the sectors 62, 63 Phase 9, 67, 81 and reaches the Chilla Manauli village. The stream then flows towards Patiala district and enters the Ghaggar river in Haryana.

== Pollution ==
On 31 July 2010, Punjab Pollution Control Board reported that effluents discharged in N-Choe from Chandigarh were beyond the permissible limit. The analysis revealed that pollution levels such as BOD-150 mg/1 and COD 320 mg/1 were found to be more than the permissible limit of 30 mg/1 and 250 mg/1, respectively. Mohali residents complained that the N-choe was not properly protected and that sewage was found in the water.
