= Paramjit =

Paramjit is an Indian given name. Notable people with the name include:

- Paramjit Bahia (1950–2012), Indian-born Canadian field hockey player
- Paramjit Kaur Gulshan (born 1949), Indian member of parliament
- Paramjit Singh Jaswal, Indian academic, education administrator and professor
- Paramjit Kaur (born 1976), Indian former athlete
- Paramjit Khurana (born 1956), Indian scientist in the University of Delhi
- Paramjit Kaur Landran (born 1971), Indian lawyer
- Paramjit Singh Pamma, Khalistani activist and alleged militant from Punjab, India
- Paramjit Samota (born 1988), Indian amateur boxer
- Nikhil Paramjit Sharma, Indian author, sports commentator and manager
- Paramjit Singh (artist) (born 1935), Indian artist
- Paramjit Singh (basketball) (1952–2024), Indian Olympic basketball player
- Paramjit Singh (sprinter) (born 1971), Indian Olympic athlete
