= New Chandigarh =

- Smart City
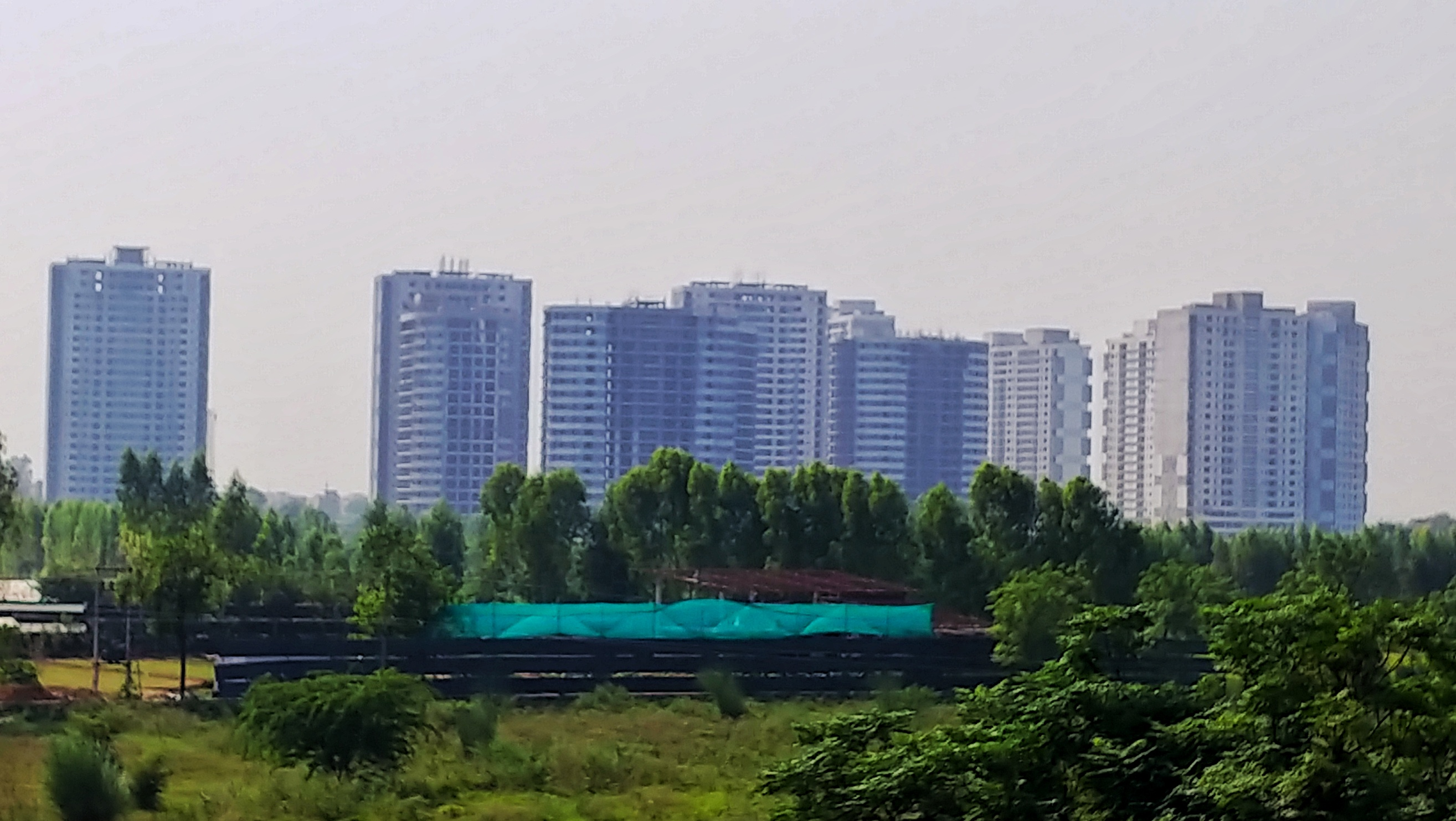
- New Chandigarh Skyline

- Location within Punjab Location within India
- Coordinates: 30°48′31.93″N 76°43′36.48″E
- Country: India
- State: Punjab
- District: Mohali District
- Established: 10 June 2014
- Named for: Chandigarh

Government
  - Deputy Commissioner: Gurpreet Kaur Sapra
- Elevation: 346 m (1,135 ft)

Languages
  - Official: Punjabi
  - Regional: Puadhi
- Time zone: UTC+5:30 (IST)
- Pincode(s): 140901
- Area code: +91 172
- Vehicle registration: PB-65
- Website: gmada.gov.in/category/new-chandigarh/about/For plots 9501310398

New Chandigarh is a central business district and planned smart city near Mullanpur in the Mohali district (SAS Nagar) in the Indian state of Punjab, which is part of the Chandigarh Capital Region. It has been designed as an extension of the city of Chandigarh. It is being developed by the Greater Mohali Area Development Authority. A digital land survey was started by using a drone on 26 April 2018 and was completed on 24 June 2018. Initial Master of city is divided in sectors numbering 1 to 27.

== Eco City ==
Eco City I and Eco City II are the residential townships in New Chandigarh, spread over 806 acres in the foothills of the Shivalik Hills.The approved master plan for New Chandigarh Mullanpur Local Planning Area includes several special development control regulations such as a no-development zone, special-use zone and building height control measures, in addition to the common development control parameters applicable to the whole Greater Mohali area, under which Mullanpur falls.

== Education City ==
The Education city of New Chandigarh is spread over 1700 acres and was developed to have campuses of universities and educational institutes. Institute of Technology and Future Trends College is located at Sector 11 of New Chandigarh.

== Medi City ==
Medicity of New Chandigarh has 100 bed Tata Memorial Centre's Homi Bhabha Cancer Hospital and Research Centre which is spread over 50 acres. Stem Cell Centre is also under construction. There is a plan of Dr. B.R. Ambedkar State Institute of Medical Sciences connected to Civil Hospital of Phase VI, Mohali. Some Organic Farms are also located in the city.

== Residential Townships ==
The Project New Chandigarh also introduced the private housing companies apart from the public residential area under GMADA. The Omaxe and DLF are the main private housing societies.

== Tourism ==
The Oberoi Sukhvilas Resort & Spa is a 5 star luxury resort located at Palanpur village near New Chandigarh. Shaheed Dr. Diwan Singh Kalepani Museum is also located nearby. Siswan forest range is a major ecotourism area which consists Leopard safari and forest trek. There are theatre plays in the city.

== Central Business District ==
The Central Business District (CBD) of New Chandigarh is envisioned as the primary commercial and financial hub of the city. Modeled on the lines of Sector 17, Chandigarh, it is designed to serve as a world-class business center. The CBD is planned to accommodate:

- High-end corporate offices and financial institutions.
- International retail outlets and premium shopping malls.
- Luxury hotels and convention centers to support business tourism.

The project is being developed under the strategic supervision of GMADA, ensuring modern infrastructure and planned connectivity with the rest of the Tricity region.

== Sports ==
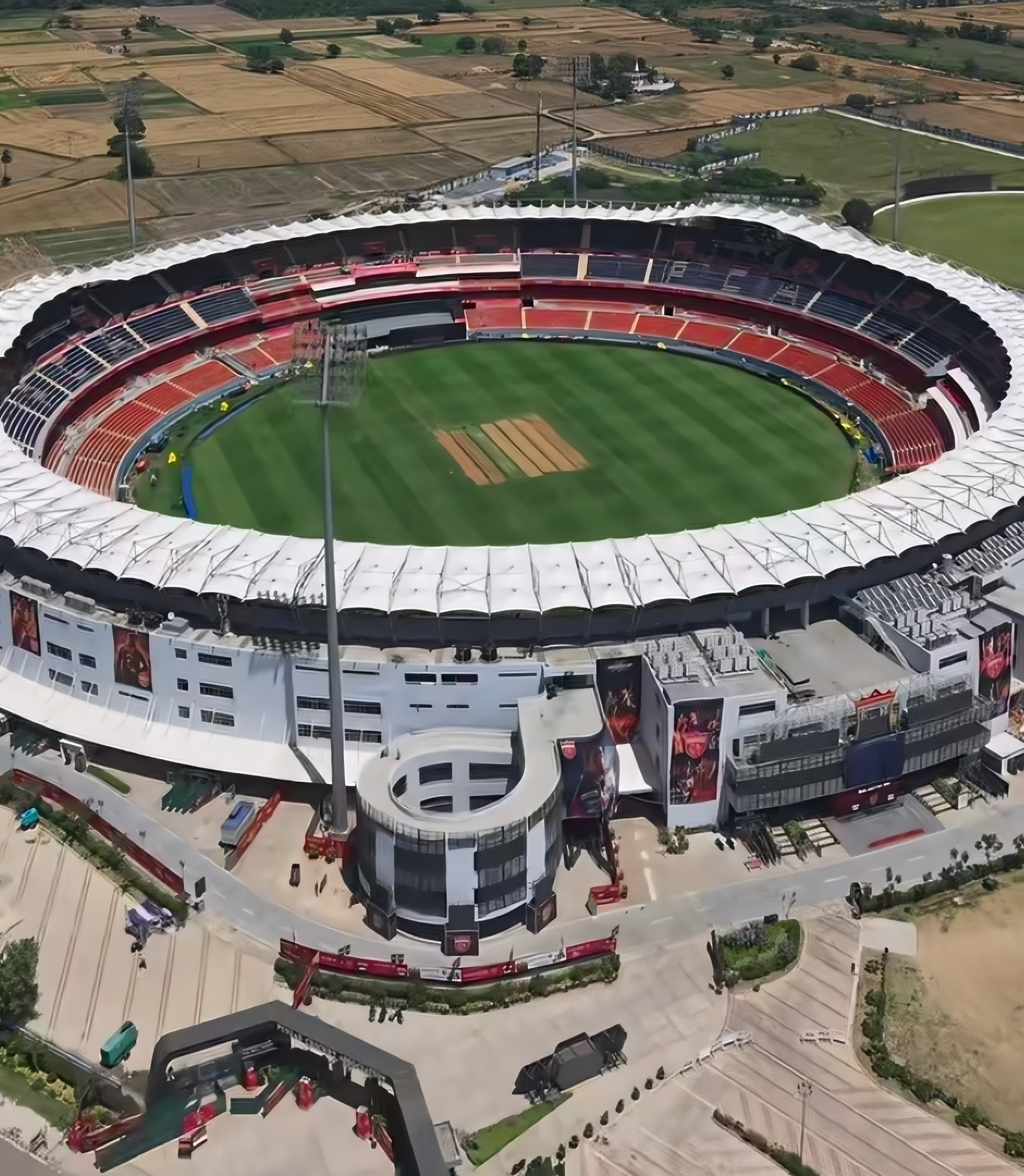
The Maharaja Yadavindra Singh International Cricket Stadium

Race Across America qualifier Shivalik Signature 2018, a 615 km (382 mi) long cycling race event was held in New Chandigarh. Also the city has the 38,000 capacity Maharaja Yadavindra Singh International Cricket Stadium.

== Connectivity ==
New Chandigarh is connected to Chandigarh Airport of Punjab via airport road through Sunny Enclave, Kharar. This six lane road connects the city with Mohali.

== The Lake ==
There is plan for artificial lake on the lines of Sukhna Lake for natural flow of rivulet in the city.

== See also ==
- Chandigarh
- Mohali
- Mullanpur Garibdass
- Kharar, SAS Nagar
