= Phase 6 =

Phase 6, Phase VI or Phase Six may refer to:

- Marvel Cinematic Universe: Phase Six, an in-development number of films set in the Marvel Cinematic Universe
- Pandemic phase 6, the highest level of a pandemic alert
- Phase 6, Mohali, a residential area of Mohali, Punjab
