= Mohali Village =

- Location in Punjab, India Mohali Village (India)
- Coordinates: 30.7289127°N 76.7159307°E
- Country: India
- State: Punjab

Languages
  - Official: Punjabi
- Time zone: UTC+5:30 (IST)
- PIN: 160055

Mohali is a village situated in SAS Nagar district, Punjab, India. Mohali city got its name from this village. It is located in Sector 56 of the city.

== Language ==
Punjabi and Hindi are main spoken languages in Mohali.

== Administration ==
The village is managed by Gram Panchayat.

== Gurudwaras and temples ==
- Gurudwara Gobindsar Sahib
