= Sector 62, Mohali =

Sector 62
- Sector
- Location in Punjab, India
- Coordinates: 30.696637°N 76.7311387°E
- Country: India
- State: Punjab
- District: Mohali

Languages
  - Official: Punjabi
- Time zone: UTC+5:30 (IST)
- PIN: 160062
- Telephone code: 0172
- Vehicle registration: PB 65

Sector 62 (commonly known as Phase 8) is locality, with important administrative buildings located in Mohali, Punjab. Gurdwara Amb Sahib, historical Gurdwara related to Guru Har Rai is situated here. It is covered with Lamba, Sector 69, 63 and Phase 7, Mohali. The only bus stand of Mohali is present in this sector. Various parks includes Dusshera Ground, Sabzi Mandi etc.

== Facility ==
=== Administrative Offices ===
- Punjab Urban Planning and Development Authority, Headquarters
- Punjab School Education Board, Headquarters
- Rural Development and Panchayati Raj, Headquarters
- Regional Transport Authority
- Police Station, Phase 8
- Mohali Bus Stand

=== Healthcare ===
- Fortis Healthcare
- Cosmo Hospital

=== Religious ===
- Gurdwara Amb Sahib - Historical shrine of Sikhs
- Gurdwara Angitha Sahib - Shrine of Sant Isher Singh.

== Access ==
Sector 62 is situated on Mohali road. It is well connected with road, rail and air. The nearest airports are Chandigarh Airport and railway station at Industrial Area - Phase 9. Auto rickshaw are easily available for commuting. A few CTU local buses also available.
