= Patiala Ki Rao =

Seasonal stream in The Punjab

Coordinates: 30.699890°N 76.668486°E

The Patiala Ki Rao is a seasonal stream that originates in Shivalik Hills, Punjab, enters Chandigarh then to Mohali and later merges into the Ghaggar River. The stream runs across Fateh Burj at Chappar Chiri. It is one of the seasonal rivulets amongst others in Chandigarh, which include Sukhna Choe in the East and N Choe in the West.

== Pollution ==
UT panel raises Patiala Ki Rao pollution with Punjab due to a significant increase in Nayagaon's population. On 31 July 2010, Punjab Pollution Control Board reported that effluents discharged in N-Choe from Chandigarh were beyond the permissible limit. The analysis revealed that pollution levels such as BOD-150 mg/1 and COD 320 mg/1 was found to be more than the permissible limit of 30 mg/1 and 250 mg/1, respectively. Mohali residents complained that the N-choe was not properly protected and that sewage was found in the water.

== Flooding ==
Annual overflow of the choe severely impacts agricultural lands in Dadumajra, Dhanas, and surrounding areas. Tewari, former MP of Sri Anandpur Sahib (2019–2024) recommended dredging the rivulet from Nayagaon to beyond Dadumajra River, Cleaning weeds, undergrowth, obstructions to restore natural flow. Patiala Ki Rao is a critical stormwater channel that helps drain excess rainwater during the monsoon. However, due to years of silt accumulation, encroachments and garbage dumping, the drain remains clogged and filled beyond its capacity, often resulting in waterlogging and flooding in adjoining residential areas during heavy rainfall.
