= Janta Market =

Janta Market is a historic booth market located in the city of Mohali, Punjab State, western India. It is situated in Phase-3B1 and is also known as Rerhi Market. It contains shops selling clothing, footwear, beauty products and other general goods and services.

== Fire incident and aftermath ==
On the morning of 1 June 2007, a fire broke out in the market. All the booths were burned with extensive damage. It is believed that the fire was arson. However, this was never proved.
