= Bhai Kuram =

Bhai Kuram was a Sikh devotee. He was a contemporary of Guru Arjan Dev and Guru Har Rai.

He lived in Village Lambian, Ajitgarh and was a Labana trader and orchard owner. He dedicated his services to Guru Har Rai in Ajitgarh. He was introduced to Sikhism and use to visit Guru Arjun Dev at Amritsar. He preached Sikh philosophy in various areas of Punjab.

== Traditional tale ==
According to traditional chronicle, Kuram once travelled to Amritsar to meet Dev. A visiting Kabul congregation brought mangoes as an expression of love for the Guru. Kuram had orchards of mangoes and he felt bad about not bringing mangoes. Guru Arjun distributed mangoes to the congregation and the next day Kuram offered mangoes at the feet of his Guru. Guru said that he would come to his orchards and take mangoes from him.

Guru Arjun died in 1688. Kuram lived near Lambian and preached Gurmat philosophy. The 7th Guru, Guru Har Rai while travelling from Kurukshetra visited his village. Kuram welcomed him and he sat under a mango tree. He asked Kuram for mangoes as he had promised his predecessor. Kuram said that it was not the season for mangoes. As per chronicle, Har Rai told him to look at the tree which had become full of mangoes.

Amb Sahib Gurdwara commemorates this story and memorial for Guru Har Rai visit, which is situated in Ajitgarh.
