= Nikhil Paramjit Sharma =

Nikhil Sharma
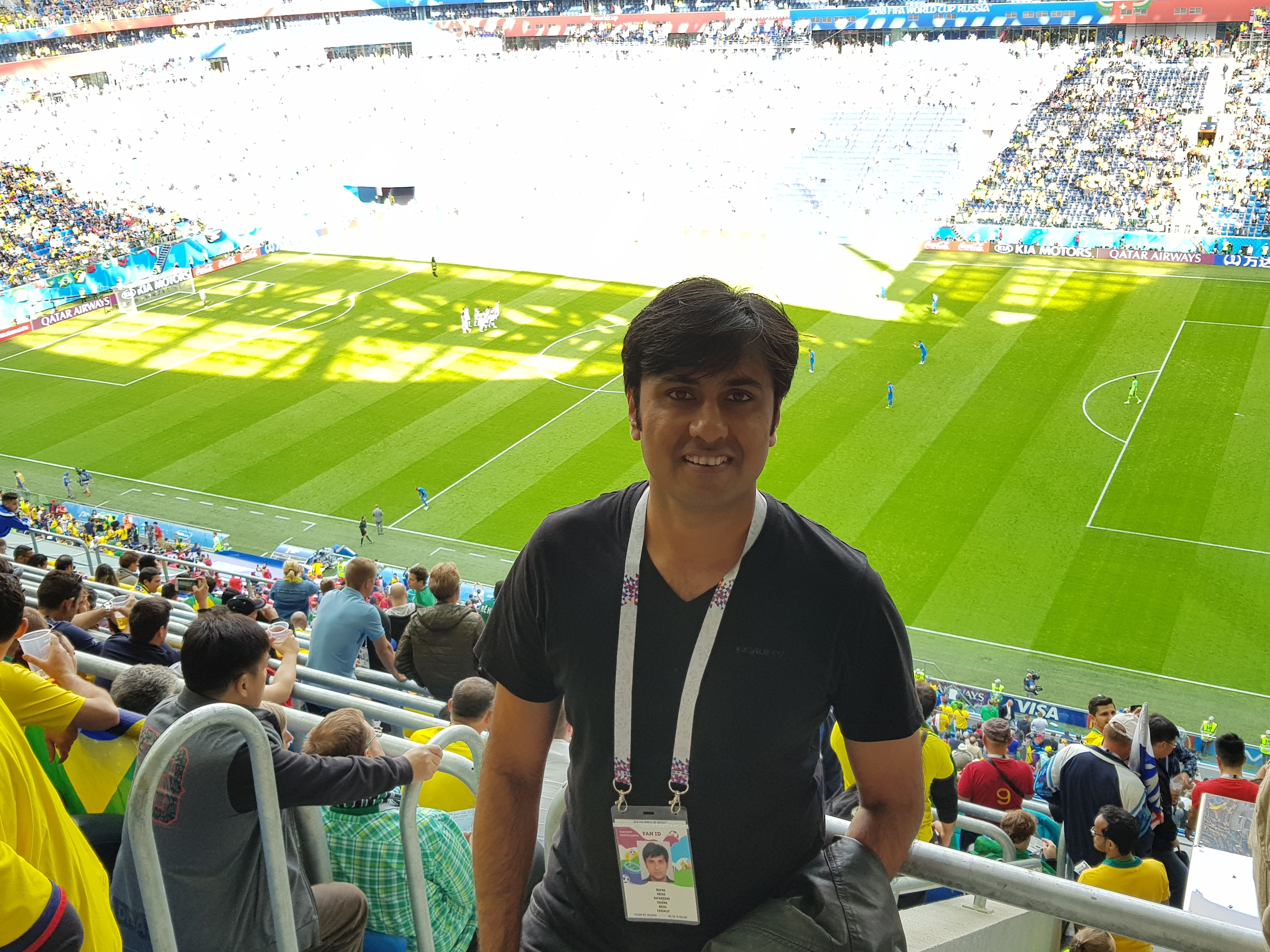
- Nikhil Sharma at the 2018 FIFA World Cup
- Born: Nikhil Paramjit Sharma; 5 May 1982 (age 44); Chandigarh, Punjab, India
- Education: Bharati Vidyapeeth Pune, MICA, Ahmedabad
- Occupations: Author, sports commentator, sports management professional
- Writing career
- Language: English
- Genre: Non-fiction
- Notable work: India's Football Dream
- Website: www.zlait.com

Nikhil Sharma is an Indian author, sports commentator and a sports management professional known for his knowledge about player development, player psychology, league structures and sustainability in sports. He co-authored his first book India's Football Dream along with Indian author and political analyst Shantanu Gupta.

He is the founder and chief executive officer of a New Delhi-based sports management company, zlait Sports Management that specialises in sports infrastructure, player representation, technical consultancy, marketing and sponsorship and media advisory. He is also an AIFF, AFC and FIFA licensed football coach. Sharma also serves as a faculty for sports communication at Pillai Institute of Management Studies and Research (FIFA/CIES Executive Programme).

== Early life and education ==
Born in Chandigarh, Punjab to Professor Paramjit Sharma and Ragini Sharma, both of whom hail from Chandigarh. He spent the first few years of his childhood in Chandigarh before his family moved to Pune, Maharashtra. He did his schooling from Vidya Bhavan High School and Loyola Junior College. He has a degree in Production Engineering from Bharati Vidyapeeth, Pune and is an MBA in Marketing from MICA, Ahmedabad.

== Career ==
=== Corporate career ===
Sharma served as the chief operating officer and later as the chief executive officer at Anglian Management Group, a sports advisory branch of Anglian Omega Group. He represented the group with interests in Shillong-based I-League side Shillong Lajong F.C. on the board of directors.

In 2014 during the inception of the Indian Super League, Sharma in his capacity of director of Shillong Lajong was part of the consortium to bid for the Guwahati-based franchise of the ISL. The consortium successfully won the bid for the franchise which was named NorthEast United.

In April 2018, Nikhil went on to form his own representation and sports consultancy start-up zlait.

=== Literary career ===
Nikhil co-authored his first book ‘India’s Football Dream’ along with Shantanu Gupta which was published by SAGE Publications India. The foreword for the book was written by India's most decorated footballer Sunil Chhetri. The book opened to favorable reviews in several media outlets including reviews from Praful Patel, President of the AIFF and Gurpreet Singh Sandhu, India national football team goalkeeper and first Indian to play in the UEFA Europa League. The book is a modern-day guidebook to Indian football that extensively covers the journey Indian football has made from its inception till the biggest event till date, the 2017 FIFA U-17 World Cup.

In March 2026, Nikhil authored the Chapter on 'Sports in South Asia and Southeast Asia' for the 3rd Edition of International Sports Management book published by Human Kinetics. The book was edited by Eric W. MacIntosh, Gonzalo A. Bravo & Carrie LeCrom.

== Bibliography ==
- India's Football Dream (February 2019)
- International Sports Management (3rd Edition)- Chapter on Sports in South Asia and South East Asia (March 2026)
