= Sector 56, Mohali =

Sector 56 Phase 6
- Sector
- Location in Punjab, India
- Coordinates: 30.7343709°N 76.7113575°E
- Country: India
- State: Chandigarh
- District: Ajitgarh

Languages
  - Official: Punjabi
- Time zone: UTC+5:30 (IST)
- PIN: 160056
- Telephone code: 0172
- Vehicle registration: CH 01

Sector 56 (commonly known as Phase 6) is residential and entry level sector located in Chandigarh. It is famous for Verka Milk Plant and Dara Studio, owned by Dara Singh. Also the sector have many marriage palaces such as celebration, Libra orchidand motor market. It is covered with Sector 54, 55, 57, Bar Majra. Seasonal Stream Patiali Ki Rao also touches this sector.

== Facilities ==
=== Banks ===
- Oriental Bank of Commerce
- Corporation bank

=== Healthcare ===
- Max Super Specialty Hospital
- Civil Hospital Mohali

=== Education ===
- Shivalik Public School
- Govt. College
- Government Model Senior Secondary School

=== Religious ===
- Shri Durga Mata Mandir Phase 6
- Gurdrwara Phase 6
- Sant Nirankari Bhawan

== Access ==
Sector 56 is situated on Kharar Chandigarh Road and Franco Hotel Road. It is well connected with road, rail and air. The nearest airports are Chandigarh Airport and railway station at Industrial Area - Phase 9. It is entry point from all sides of punjab towards Mohali Bus Stand. Auto rickshaw are easily available for commuting. It is easy to commute by bus as all buses to and fro punjab stops in this Sector. A few CTU local buses also available connecting PGI and Landran.
