= Leisure Valley, Chandigarh =

Botanical garden in Chandigarh, India

Leisure Valley
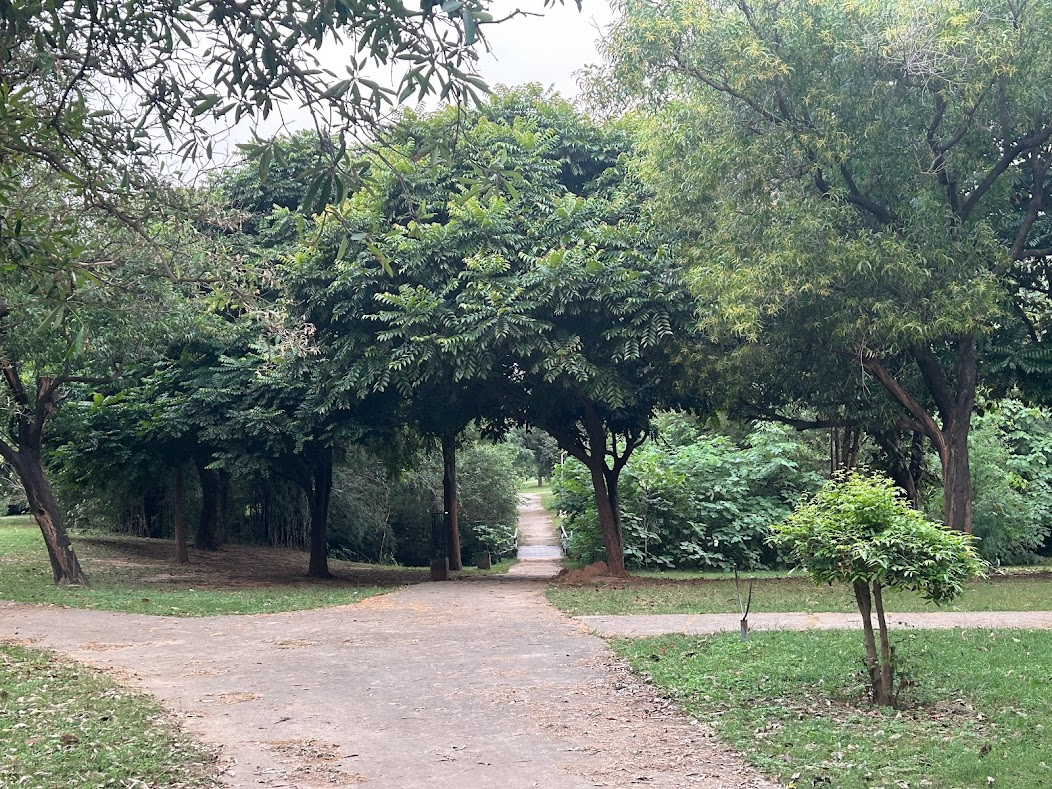
- One of the several trails at Leisure Valley
- Interactive map of Leisure Valley
- Type: Urban park
- Coordinates: 30°45′11″N 76°47′31″E
- Area: 400 acres (160 ha)
- Opened: 1966
- Website: chandigarh.gov.in/green-chandigarh/leisure-valley

Leisure Valley is an extensive linear park spanning over 8 kilometers, in Chandigarh. Originally an eroded valley, it was transformed by Le Corbusier into a green corridor that traverses the city from Sector 1 in the north to Sector 53 in the south.

It consists of a series of themed gardens designed to offer both physical and mental rejuvenation to residents.
