= Mohali =

Mohali Mōhālī (Punjabi)
- City
- Sahibzada Ajit Singh Nagar; Sāhibzādā Ajīt Singh Nagar (Punjabi)
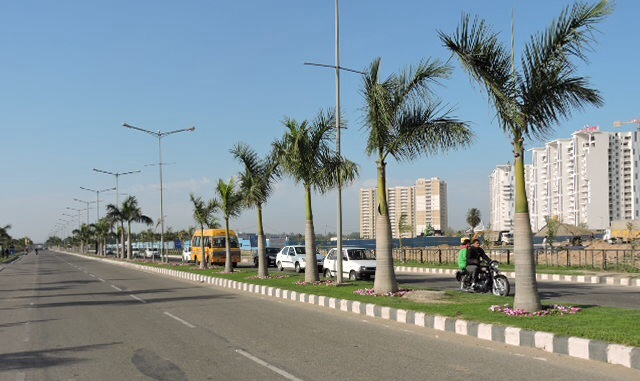
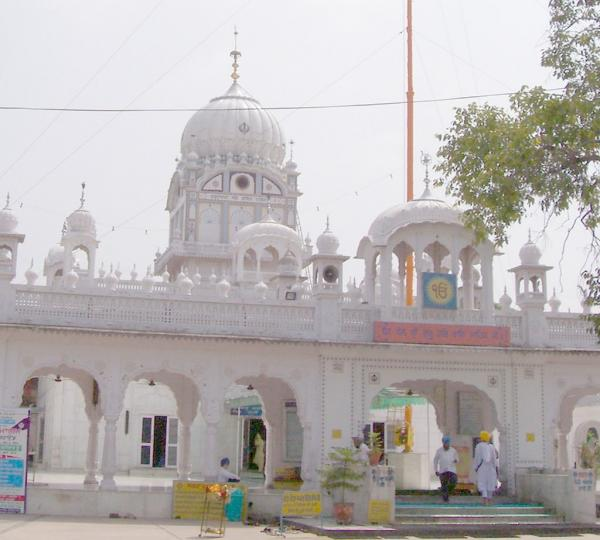
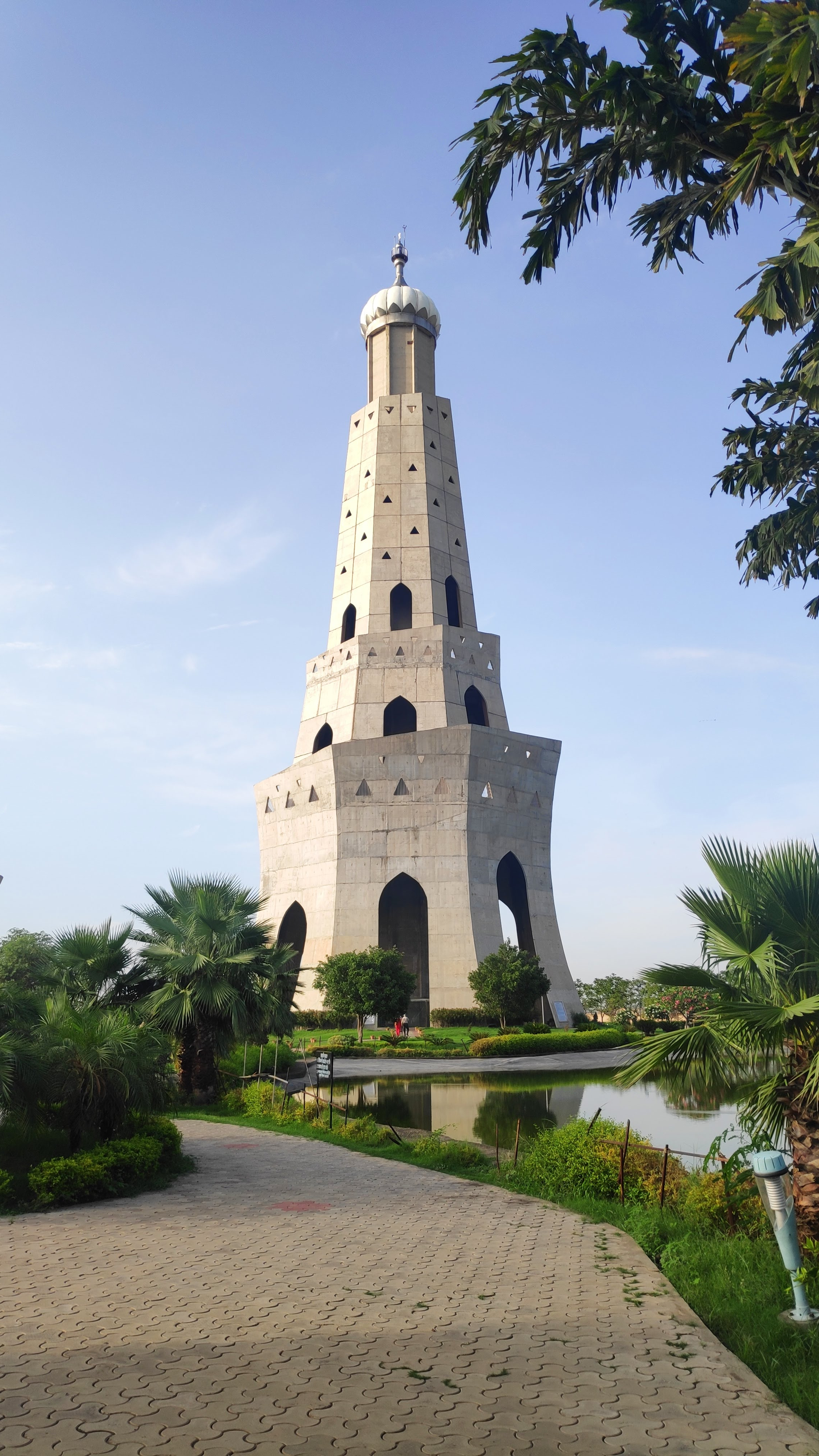
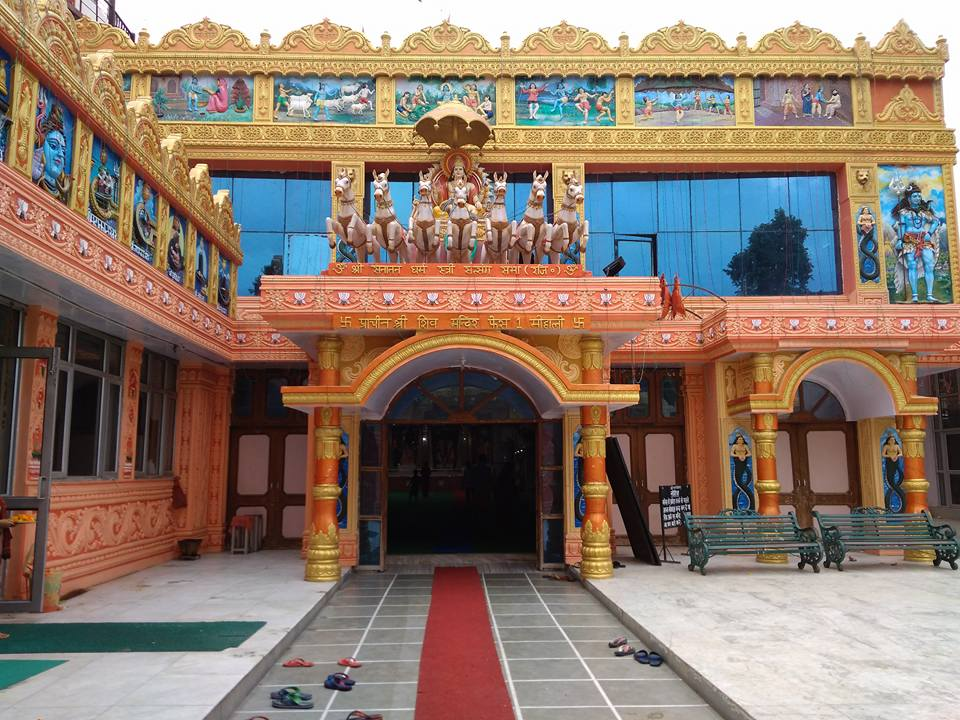
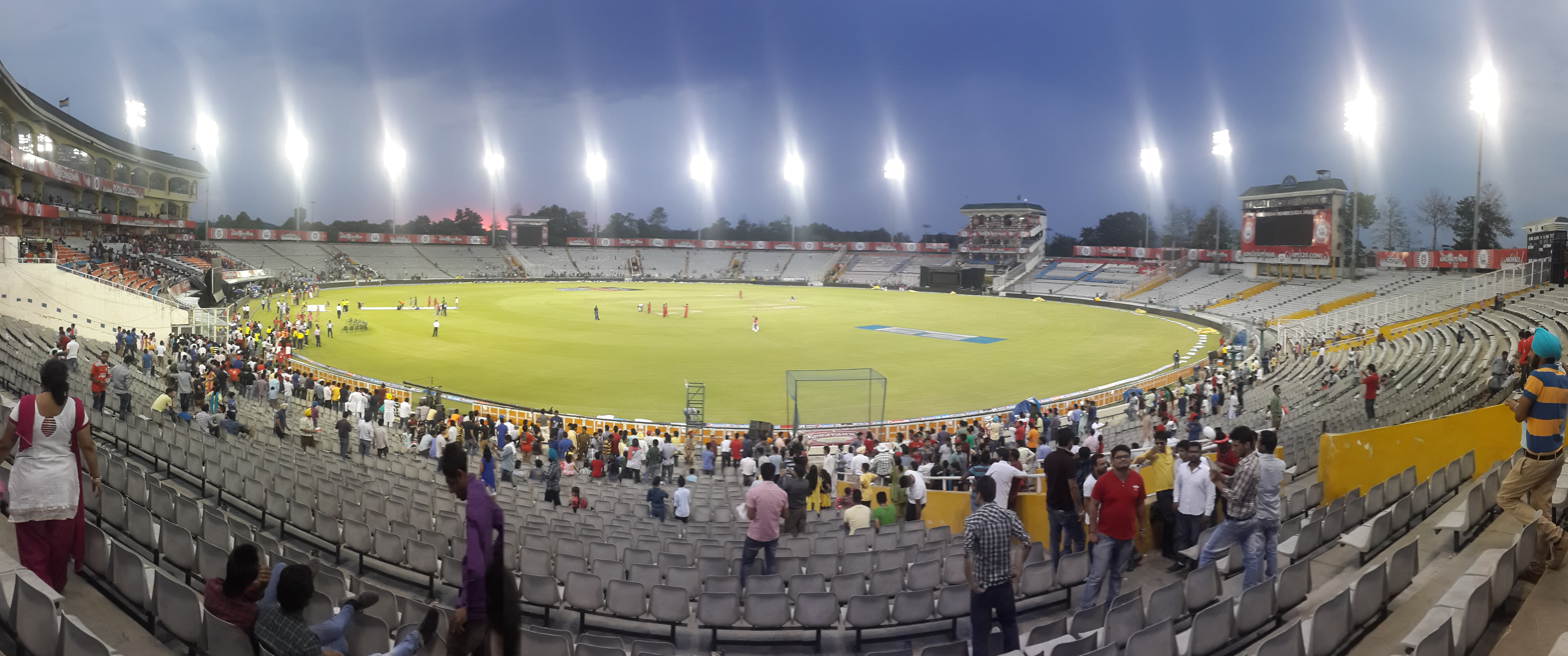
- View of Chandigarh International Airport road Gurdwara Amb Sahib Fateh Burj Shiv Temple Quark City PCA IS Stadium
- Nickname: Ajit Singh's City
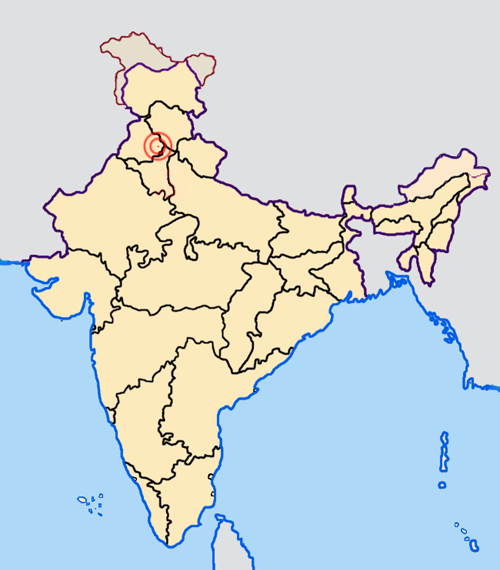
- Map of Mohali in North India

- Map of Mohali in Punjab Mohali (India)
- Coordinates: 30.699°N 76.693°E
- Country: India
- State: Punjab
- District: Mohali
- Established: 1 November 1975
- Founder: Zail Singh
- Named for: Sahibzada Ajit Singh

Government
  - Type: Municipality
  - Body: Municipal Corporation
  - Mayor: Amarjeet Singh Sidhu
  - Deputy Commissioner: Aashika Jain, IAS

Area 176
  - City: 176 km^{2} (68 sq mi)
- Elevation: 316 m (1,037 ft)

Population (2011)
  - City: 176,152
  - Density: 1,000/km^{2} (2,590/sq mi)
  - Urban: 176,152
- Demonym(s): Mohali Wale, Mohalite

Languages
  - Official: Punjabi
  - Regional: Puadhi
- Time zone: UTC+5:30 (IST)
- Pincode(s): 140XXX - 160XXX
- Area code: +91 172
- Vehicle registration: PB-65
- Sex ratio: 0.911 males/female (City)
- Literacy: 91.96% (City); 91.86% (Metro)
- GDP: US $8.3 bn
- Nearest city: Chandigarh
- Website: http://mcmohali.org/

Mohali, officially Sahibzada Ajit Singh Nagar or Ajitgarh, is a planned city in the Mohali district in Punjab, India, which is an administrative and a commercial hub lying south-west of Chandigarh. It is the headquarters of the Mohali district and one of the six Municipal Corporations of the State. It is officially named after Sahibzada Ajit Singh, the eldest son of Guru Gobind Singh. It is one of the major satellite cities of Chandigarh and is part of the Chandigarh Capital Region.

Mohali has developed rapidly as an Information technology hub of the state of Punjab, and has thus grown in importance. The Government of Punjab has initiated significant infrastructure and recreation projects in attempts to increase the standard of living in Mohali. Roads have been built to create networks between Mohali and Chandigarh International Airport to boost its international connectivity.

Mohali was earlier a part of the Rupnagar district and was carved out and made a part of a separate district in 2006.

== History ==
=== Early history ===
Prehistoric evidence has been found in Mohali and its surrounding regions. Due to the presence of the lake, fossil remains with imprints of a large variety of aquatic plant, animal, and amphibian life have been found. As a part of the Punjab region, it has many rivers in the areas where it is speculated that ancient and primitive settlements by humans began. Some 8,000 years ago, the area was also known to be a home to the Harappans.

=== Medieval history ===
Mohali means settlement. The village of Mohali was a part of the Cis-Sutlej states in the Malwa region of Punjab.

The village Lambian, located in the city, was visited by Guru Har Rai, the 7th Guru of the Sikhs. A battle took place here between the British and 500 Sikhs under the command of Akali Hanuman Singh, in which Akali Hanuman Singh attained martyrdom.

=== Modern history ===
After the partition of India in 1947, the former British province of Punjab was split between east Punjab in India and west Punjab in Pakistan. The Indian Punjab required a new capital city to replace Lahore, which became part of Pakistan during partition. Consequently, the government made Chandigarh from nearly 50 Puadhi speaking villages of the then state of East Punjab, India.

Mohali was conceived after the trifurcation of Punjab and its capital Chandigarh became a Union Territory in the late 1960s. In 1967, the area around Mohali Village was initially developed as an industrial estate; this was broadened with residential areas to meet housing demands. The township plan for Mohali was put forward by the All India Congress Committee during the annual session held in 1975 at Mohali. On 1 November 1975, Punjab Chief Minister Giani Zail Singh laid the foundation stone of Mohali township and named it Sahibzada Ajit Singh Nagar. It was rechristened to Ajitgarh by the union government in the year 2012, as it was felt at that time that the name, SAS Nagar, was too long.

== City design ==
Mohali and Chandigarh are contiguous, separated by the administrative boundary between Punjab and the Union Territory of Chandigarh. The original plan of Mohali was conceived as an extension of Chandigarh's sector-based urban design, incorporating an approximately 800 m × 1,200 m grid pattern similar to that of Chandigarh.

The first eleven sectors of Mohali are commonly referred to as Phases. Initial development extended up to Phase 7. Expansion beyond Phase 8 began in the late 1980s, and the city's bus stand was constructed during the development of Phase 8 in the mid-1990s.

Several sectors are shared between Chandigarh and Sahibzada Ajit Singh Nagar (Mohali), including Sectors 48, 51, 52, 54, 56, 61, and 63. Sectors numbered 63 and above fall within the jurisdiction of Sahibzada Ajit Singh Nagar.

The corresponding phase–sector alignment is as follows:

- Phase 1 – Sector 55
- Phase 2 – Sector 56
- Phase 3 – Sector 57
- Phase 4 – Sector 58
- Phase 5 – Sector 59
- Phase 6 – Sector 60
- Phase 7 – Sector 61
- Phase 8 – Sector 62
- Phase 9 – Sector 63
- Phase 10 – Sector 64

=== Greater Mohali Area Development Authority master plan ===
According to the GMADA master plan, the city extends up to Sector 128, incorporating several surrounding villages. These include Aerocity, Alipur, Bairampur, Bakarpur, Ballo Majra, Balongi, Bari, Bar Majra, Bathlana, Behlol, Bhago Majra, Chajju Majra, Chaparchiri, Daun, Desu Majra, Dyalpur, Harlalpur, Jandpur, Jhampur, Jheureri, Jhungian, Kailon, Kandala, Khuni Majra, Kishanpura, Kurali, Landiali, Landran, Manak Majra, Manana, Matran, Naraingarh, Pattlin, Raipur Kalan, Sambalki, Saneta, Santemajra, Shafipur, Siaun, Sihanpur, Sukhgarh, Tapauli, and Thaska.

GMADA also developed Aerocity as part of the expansion near Shaheed Bhagat Singh International Airport.

IT City Mohali, developed under GMADA, covers approximately 1,600 acres and includes Sectors 82, 82A, and 83A. The project includes residential and commercial developments intended to support information technology and related industries.

=== Chandigarh Tricity ===
Mohali and Panchkula function as satellite cities of Chandigarh. Together with Chandigarh, they form the region commonly referred to as the Chandigarh Tricity. Panchkula is located in Panchkula district, Haryana.

== Climate ==
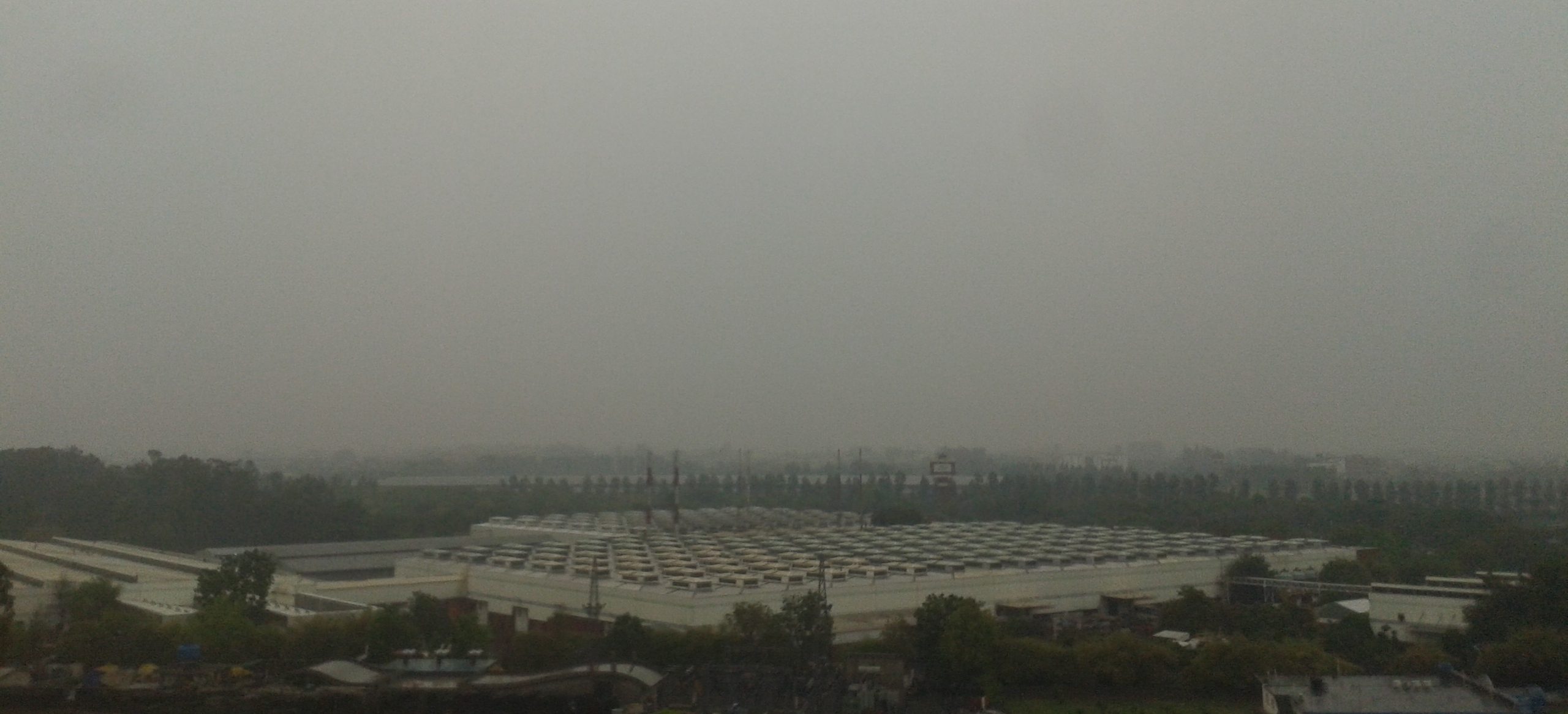
Clouds and downpour at Godrej, Mohali during mid-April 2015

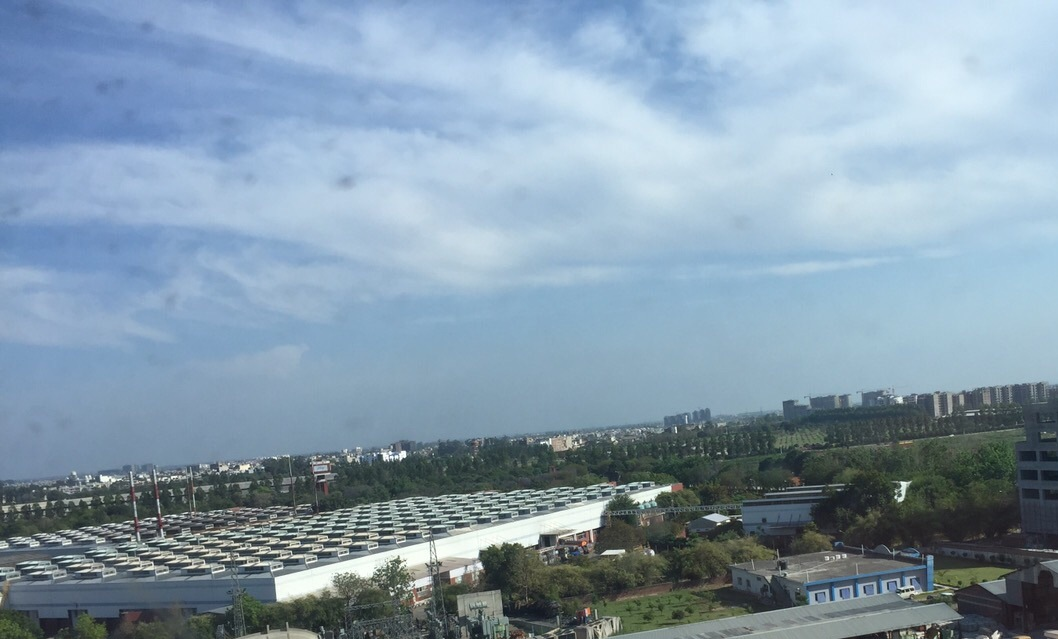
Godrej Mohali clean skies

Sahibzada Ajit Singh Nagar has a sub-tropical continental monsoon climate characterised by a seasonal rhythm: hot summers, slightly cold winters, unreliable rainfall and great variation in temperature (−1 to 44 °C or 30 to 111 °F). In winter, frost sometimes occurs during December and January. The average annual rainfall is recorded at 617 millimetres (24.3 in). The city also receives occasional winter rains from the west.

=== Average temperature ===
- Summer: The temperature in summer may rise to a maximum of 47 °C (117 °F) . Temperatures generally remain between 30 and 40 °C (86 and 104 °F).
- Autumn: In autumn, the temperature may rise to a maximum of 36 °C (97 °F). Temperatures usually remain between 16 and 27 °C (61 and 81 °F) in autumn. The minimum temperature is around 13 °C (55 °F).
- Winter: Average temperatures in winter (November to February) remain at (maximum) 7 to 15 °C (45 to 59 °F) and (minimum) 1 and 5 °C (34 and 41 °F).
- Spring: spring temperatures vary between (min) 16 and 25 °C (61 and 77 °F) (max).

== Demographics ==
Religion in Mohali (2011)
Religion	Percent
Sikhism	51.53%
Hinduism	45.55%
Islam	1.68%
Christianity	0.79%
Others	0.45%

=== Languages ===
Languages spoken in Mohali City (2011)
1. Punjabi (67.2%)
2. Hindi (24.3%)
3. Nepali (0.37%)
4. Bengali (0.34%)
5. Urdu (0.32%)
6. Malayalam (0.31%)
7. Bhojpuri (0.30%)
8. Others (6.89%)

As per 2011 census, Mohali's urban agglomeration (metropolitan area) had a population of 176,152, out of which males were 92,407 and females were 83,745. The effective literacy rate (7+ years) was 93.04% per cent. The sex ratio of Mohali is 906 females per 1,000 males.

Sikhism is the majority religion in Mohali which is followed by 51.53% of the people. Hinduism is the second most followed religion which is adhered to by 45.55% of the people. Minority religions like Islam and Christianity are followed by 1.68% and 0.79% of the population, with 0.45% are Buddhists, Jains and others.

== Politics and government ==
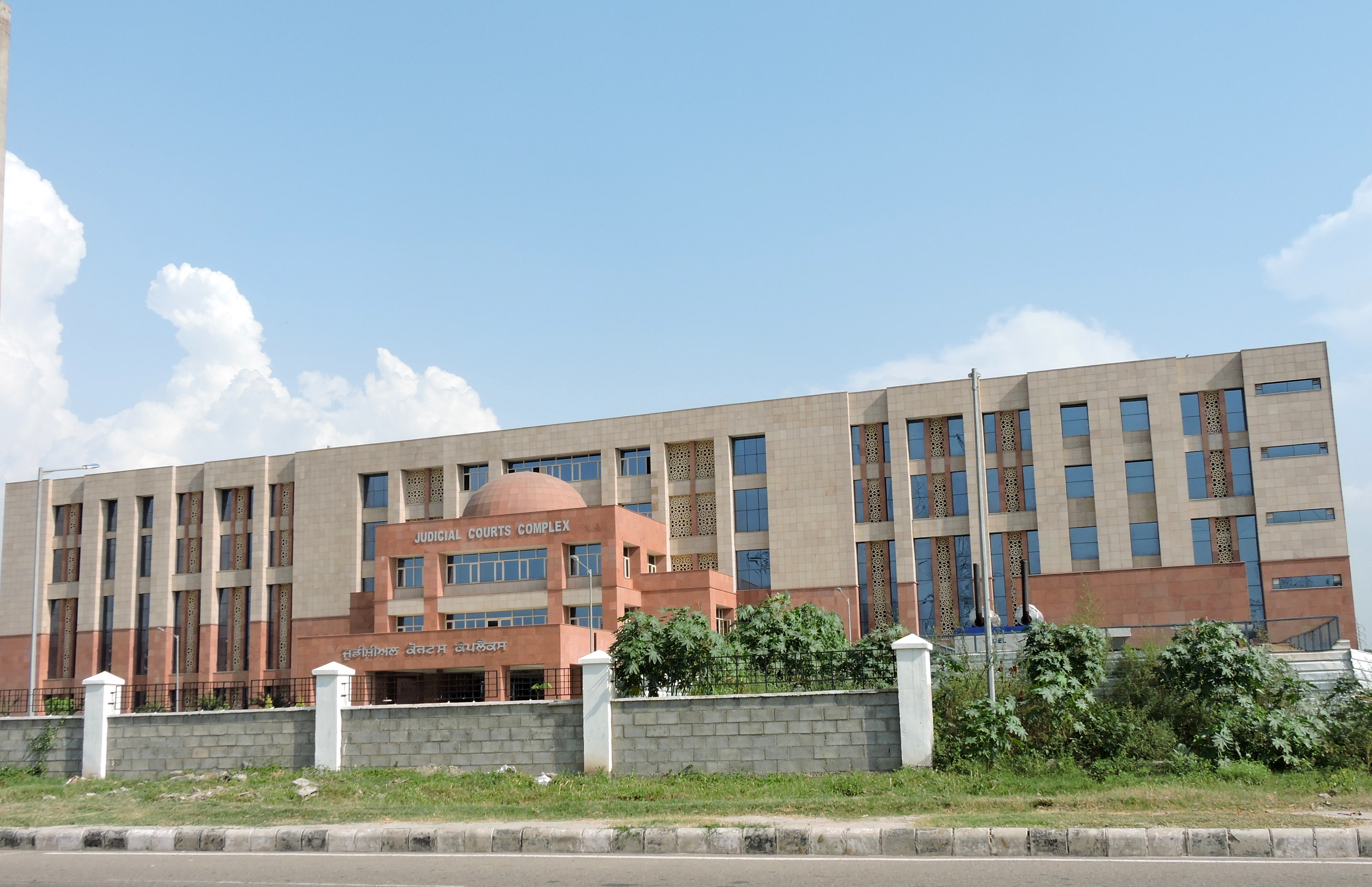
District court complex, Mohali, Punjab, India

The Deputy Commissioner, an officer belonging to the Indian Administrative Service, is the overall in charge of the General Administration in the Districts of India. Currently, Girish Dayalan is serving as Deputy Commissioner. The civic administration in Mohali under the Municipal Corporation (established 1984), a body of elected councillors and is headed by a Commissioner chosen from the elected members.

City officials
Member of Parliament	Manish Tewari	2017
Mayor	Amarjeet Singh Siddhu	August 2015
Municipal Commissioner	MR Dhiman	
Administrator	MR Dhiman	

Sahibzada Ajit Singh Nagar is a Municipal Corporation, with Kulwant Singh as the first mayor.The corporation is currently administered by Municipal Commissioner Sh. Sandeep Singh Garha, PCS, while Sh. Sarbjeet Singh serves as Mayor. It operates under the Punjab Municipal Corporation Act, 1976, which provides the legal framework for its governance, administration, and delivery of municipal services.

Sahibzada Ajit Singh Nagar is part of Anandpur Sahib Parliamentary Constituency, represented by Manish Tewari since 2019, while in Punjab Legislative Assembly, Sahibzada Ajit Singh Nagar is represented since 2012 by MLA Balbir Singh Sidhu from Congress. Before 2012, Sahibzada Ajit Singh Nagar was part of the Kharar Assembly Constituency. In the 2012 Punjab Legislative Assembly election, a new Assembly Constituency was carved out in the name of Mohali (as Sahibzada Ajit Singh Nagar was known during Assembly Elections 2012). Sahibzada Ajit Singh Nagar is also represented in Shiromani Gurdwara Parbandhak Committee (SGPC) by Paramjit Kaur Landran and Hardeep Singh. The seat was reserved for women during the 2011 SGPC Elections.

== Transport ==
=== Roads ===
The main bus stand of this city is located in Sector 56, where many government and private bus operators provide services to different cities of the state. Chandigarh Transport Undertaking (CTU) provides bus connectivity with the rest of the city. Chandigarh Sector 43 Bus Stand and Bus stand of 17 Sector are also close to Mohali.

Auto-rickshaws ply throughout the city. There are several third-party transportations available.

=== Rail ===
Mohali Railway Station is situated in Industrial Area, Phase 11 and connects the city with several important locations in the region such as Delhi, Ludhiana and Amritsar, as well as other parts of the country.

=== Air ===
Shaheed Bhagat Singh International Airport is located near Aerocity in Mohali. It has both domestic and international flights.

== Economy ==
Quark, Sahibzada Ajit Singh Nagar

Mohali's economy is largely manufacturing-based, the major companies in the region include Punjab Tractor Limited (PTL), ICI Paints, and Punjab Communications Limited. Also small- and medium sized companies, such as Torque Pharmaceuticals, are based in Mohali.

Telecommunications service providers including Tata Communications, Vodafone and the Godrej Group operate within SAS Nagar. SAS Nagar's role in facilitating multinational corporations is growing, with contributions from global tech giants such as Quark and Philips.

Denver-based Quark, Inc. has created a $500M, 46-acre (190,000 m^{2}) QuarkCity in SAS Nagar, complete with a residential complex comprising 30% of the area; the shopping, entertainment, medical and educational districts consume another 10%. It was designed to generate 25,000 direct and 100,000 indirect jobs. It also includes a Special Economic Zone (SEZ). It is located 265 km (165 mi) north of India's capital city of New Delhi.

The region has been targeted by an increasing number of outsourcing IT companies.

== Sports ==
Mohali contributes greatly to sports within the Punjab region (most notably Minerva Academy), with 8 multipurpose sports complexes equipped football, field hockey, cricket, swimming, table tennis, athletics, volleyball, badminton, tennis, etc. It has two international cricket stadiums, latest being Maharaja Yadavindra Singh International Cricket Stadium at Mullanpur Garibdass. It also home to the Olympian Balbir Singh International Hockey Stadium.

=== Cricket ===
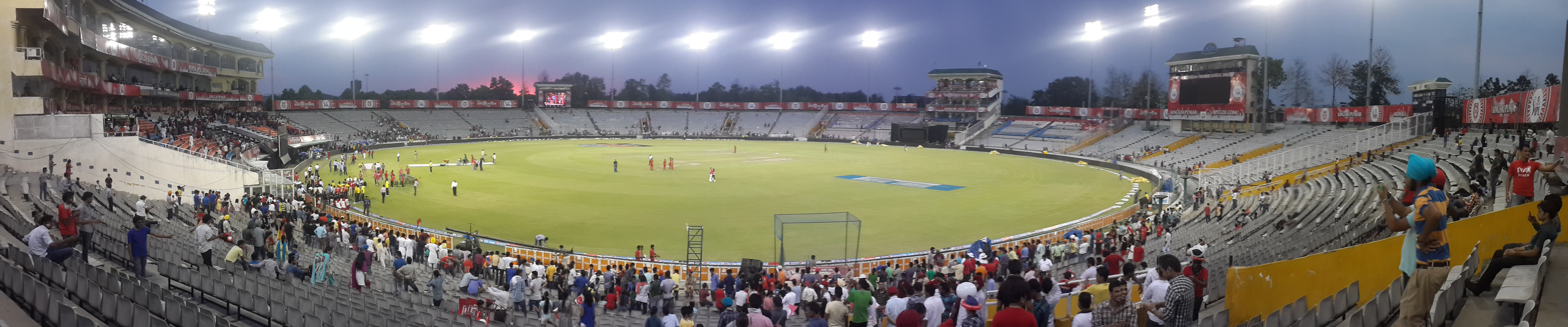
A panorama of the stadium

In 1990, the Punjab Cricket Association (PCA) unveiled a plan to build a state-of-the-art facility complete with a separate practice ground—to be built in a swampy area in the city. The PCA invested heavily in the ground, a swimming pool, health club, tennis court, library, restaurant, and bar and outdoor & indoor cricket practice nets were incorporated into the plans.

The construction of the stadium took around ₹25 crores and three years to complete. The stadium has an official capacity of 30000 spectators. The stadium was designed by Arun Loomba and Associates, Panchkula and constructed by R.S. Construction Company, Chandigarh. The lights here are unconventional compared to other cricket stadiums, in that the light pillars are very low in height. This is to avoid aircraft from the nearby airport colliding with the light pillars. The stream passing through the central part of Chandigarh called N Choe, also passes alongside the stadium. PCA Stadium is home of Punjab Kings (IPL Mohali franchisee).

=== Hockey ===
The city has the Olympian Balbir Singh International Hockey Stadium which serves as the home ground for the hockey club, Punjab Warriors, of Hockey India League.

== Places of interest ==
Places of tourist interest in and around this region include the following:

- Fateh Burj

=== Religious places ===
==== Gurudwara Amb Sahib ====
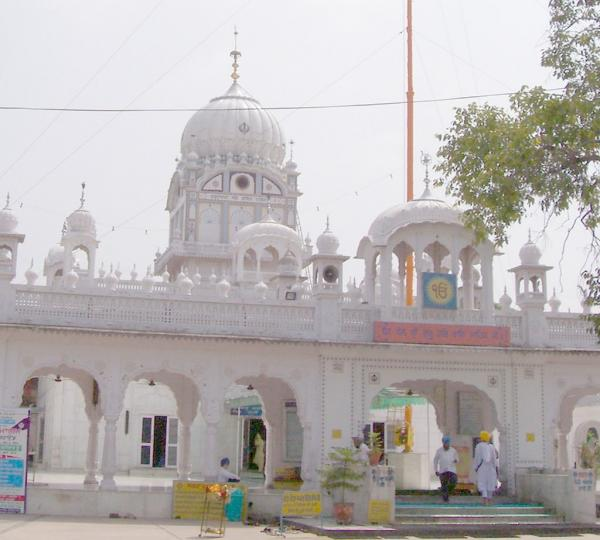
Gurudwara Amb Sahib

Gurudwara Amb Sahib is a historical shrine situated in Sector 62, Mohali commemorates the visit of the 7th Guru of Sikhs, Guru Har Rai. The place also commemorates the meeting of Guru Har Rai with his famous Sikh Bhai Kuram, a Labana trader. This shrine is managed by SGPC, Amritsar.

==== Shri Shiv Mandir ====
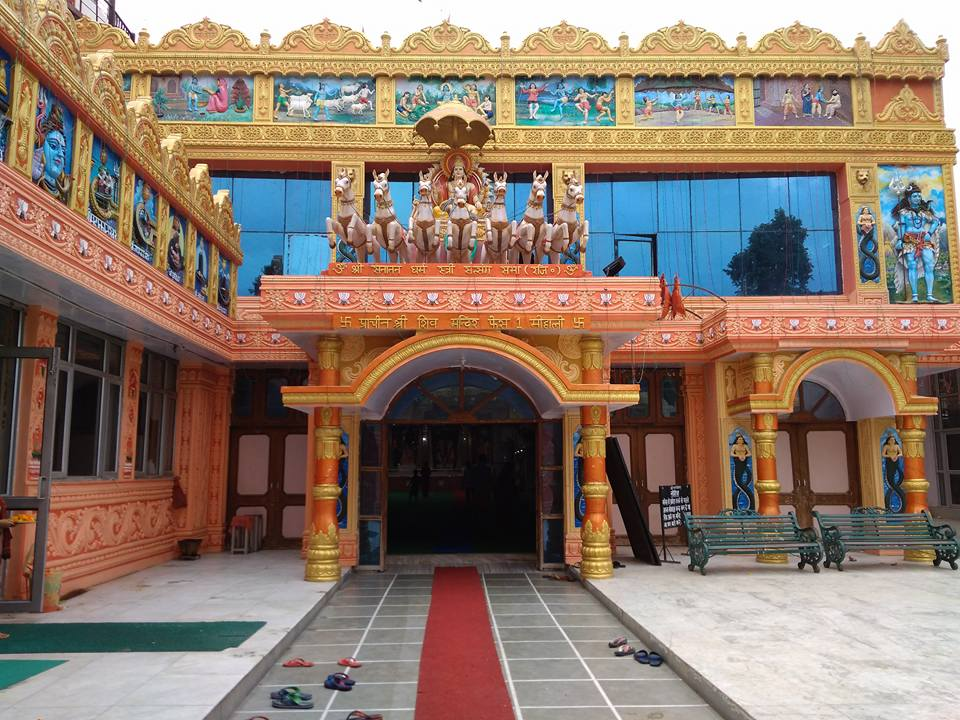
Shiv Mandir, Phase 1, Mohali

Shri Shiv Mandir is an old Hindu temple dedicated to Shiva, situated in Phase1.

==== Gurudwara Singh Shaheedan ====
This shrine is situated in the village Sohana, close to Sector 70 constructed in memory of the martyrdom of Jathedar Baba Hanuman Singh, a Nihang Jathedar. He, along with 500 Sikhs, attained martyrdom at this place in a battle against British forces during the Anglo-Sikh Wars.

==== Dera Dargah Sharif Bakarpur ====
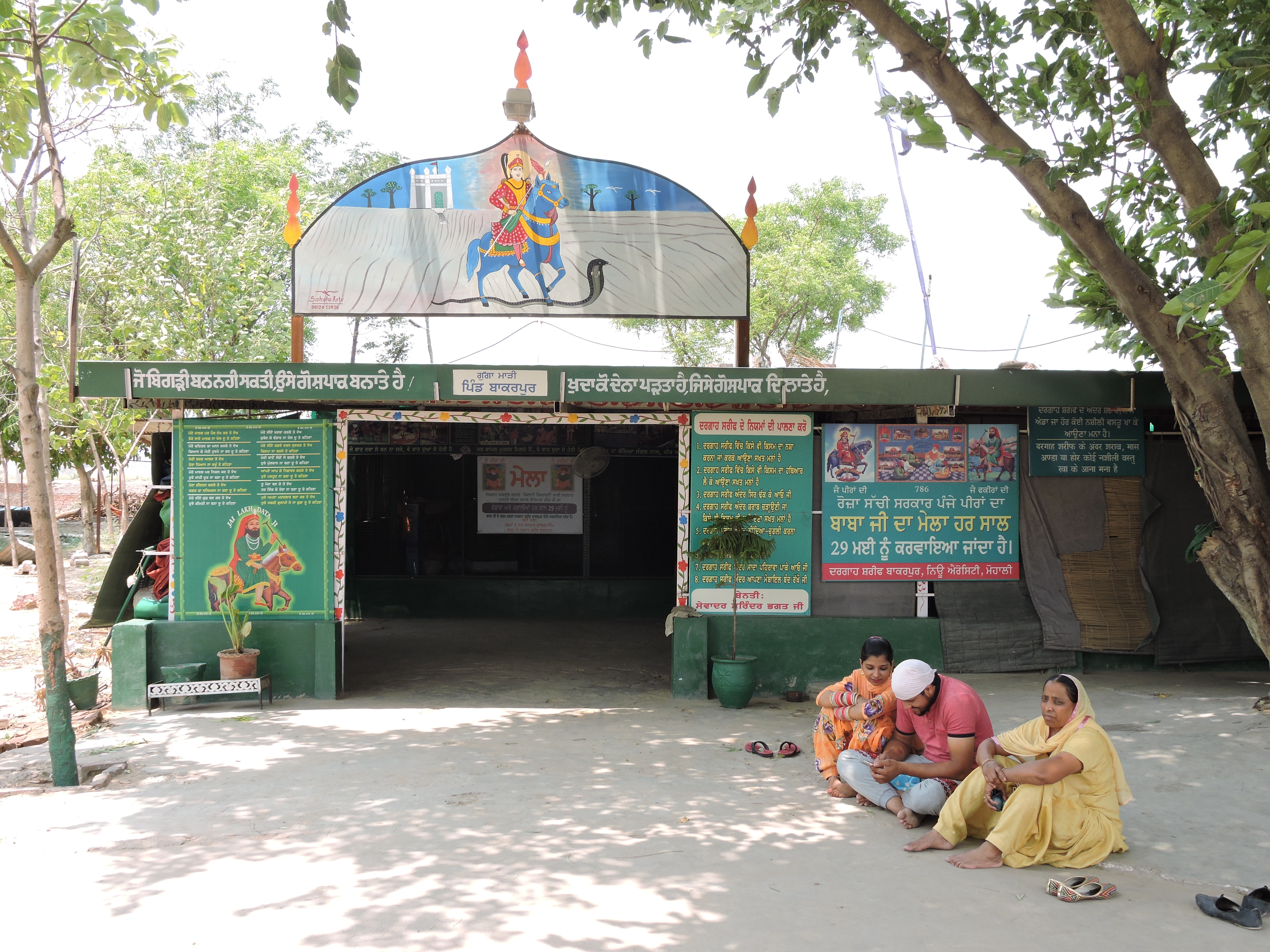
Dargah Sharif Bakarpur, Mohali

This shrine is situated in the village Bakarpur, in Aerocity, near Mohali Airport. This shrine is home of Ali and five Pirs. Sai Surinder Singh is currently the chief dera head of this Dargah.

=== Parks and gardens ===
- Nature Park, Phase 8
- Rose Garden, Phase 3B1
- Bougainvillea Garden, Phase 4
- Silvy Park, Phase 10
- Valley Park, Phase 8
- Ekta Park, Phase 7 (near Chawla Chowk) Mohali
- Kargil Park, Sector 71
- Fountain Park, Sector 70
- City park, sector 68

=== Markets and other places ===
- Main Market, Phase - 7, SAS Nagar
- Main Market, Phase - 4, SAS Nagar
- Main Market, Phase - 3, SAS Nagar
- Main Market, Phase - 1, SAS Nagar
- Main Market, Phase - 5, SAS Nagar
- Main Market, Phase - 10, SAS Nagar
- Punjab Cricket Association Stadium, SAS Nagar
- International Hockey Stadium, Phase-9
- Gurudwara Amb Sahib, Phase - 8
- Janta Market, Phase - 3B1

=== Chowks of Mohali ===
The famous chowks of Mohali, which replicate one of the best features of the city are:

- YPS Chowk
- Diplast Chowk
- Airport Chowk

== Upcoming developing areas ==
- Aerocity, Mohali
- Aerotropolis, Mohali

=== Other nearby places ===
- Sikh Ajaibghar, Sector 119, Village Balongi, Village Bar Majra
- VR Punjab, Kharar
- Gurudwara Nabha Sahib - Zirakpur
- CP67 Mall, Mohali
- KSB Mall, Mohali - Sohana Project (KSBE)
- KSBG (Gymnasium) - Sohana Project (KSBE)

== Education ==
Indian School of Business, Mohali, Punjab

Schools

- Anee's School, Sector-69, Mohali
- Doon International School, Sector-69, Mohali
- Gian Jyoti Public School, Phase 2, Mohali
- Gurukul World School, Sector-69, Mohali
- Learning Paths School, Sector 67, Mohali
- Shivalik Public School, Mohali
- Yadavindra Public School, Sector 51, Mohali

Universities

- Plaksha University Alpha, Sector 101, IT City Rd, Sahibzada Ajit Singh Nagar
- Chandigarh University NH-95, Chandigarh-Ludhiana Highway, Mohali

Science and medical colleges

- Dr. B.R. Ambedkar State Institute of Medical Sciences (AIMS, Mohali)
- Indian Institute of Science Education and Research, Mohali (IISER Mohali)

Engineering colleges

- Indo Global Colleges
- Shaheed Udham Singh College of Engineering & Technology
- Chandigarh Engineering College

Business schools

- Indian School of Business (ISB), Sector 81
- Amity University, Sector 82A, IT City, Mohali
- Plaksha University, Sector 83A, IT City, Mohali

Law schools

- Army Institute of Law

Pharmacy

- National Institute of Pharmaceutical Education and Research, Mohali (NIPER)

== Healthcare ==
The city has several speciality hospitals. Government dispensaries also are present in some sectors. Dr. B.R. Ambedkar State Institute of Medical Sciences of phase 6 is the oldest government hospital in the city and the new hospital is in Sector 66.

The city has many multi-facility private hospitals like the Max Super Speciality Hospital, Fortis Hospital, Silver Oak Hospital, Ivy Hospital, Indus Super Speciality Hospital, Mayo Hospital, Cheema Medical Complex, Mukat Hospital and Heart Institute, Cosmo Hospital, Amar Hospital, Grecian Super Speciality Hospital, Sohana Hospital, Ace Heart and Vascular Institute, SGHS Hospitals, AM Hospital, ESI Hospital and Regional Spinal Injury Center (Sector 70).

== See also ==
- New Chandigarh
