= Paramjit Kaur Landran =

Indian politician

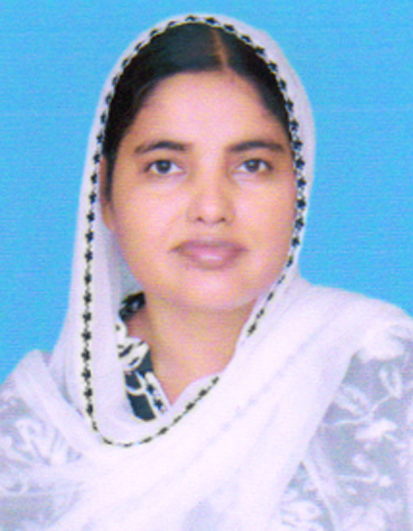
- Paramjit Kaur Landran

Chairperson Punjab State Women Commission
- In office 2013–2018
- Preceded by: Gurdev Kaur Sangha
- Succeeded by: Manisha Gulati

Member Shiromani Gurdwara Parbandhak Committee
- In office 2011 – Incumbent
- Constituency: Mohali

Personal details
- Born: 29 September 1971 (age 55) Landran, Punjab, India
- Party: Shiromani Akali Dal
- Spouse: Unmarried
- Education: Punjabi University, Patiala
- Profession: Lawyer
- As of 1 January, 2013

Paramjit Kaur Landran (Punjabi: ਪਰਮਜੀਤ ਕੌਰ ਲਾਂਡਰਾਂ) (born 29 September 1971) is a lawyer, member of Shiromani Gurdwara Parbandhak Committee for Mohali constituency representing the Shiromani Akali Dal. She was elected to the Shiromani Gurdwara Parbandhak Committee House in the elections held on 18 September 2011. She is Former Chairperson of Punjab State Women Commission, Chairperson of Panchayat Mahila Shakti Association, Punjab, A scheme sponsored by Govt. of India, Press and Office Secretary of Shiromani Akali Dal (Women Wing). She served as Vice Chairperson of Panchayat Samiti, Kharar from 2008 to 2013.

== Personal life ==
Paramjit Kaur Landran was born in Landran on 29 September 1971 to Dilbag Singh Gill and Labh Kaur. She did her early schooling from Landran and went to Post Graduate Govt College for Girls – Sector 11, Chandigarh, GCG for BA and then to Punjabi University, Patiala for LLB. As a Lawyer She practised at District Courts, Mohali since 1996 until being appointed as Chairperson of Punjab State Women Commission in January 2013.

== Political career ==
In 1998 at the age of 27 she was elected Sarpanch of her native village Landran. First female to hold the Office of Sarpanch in her village and youngest in the state at that time. In 2008 she was elected member of Panchayat Samiti, Kharar and went on to be elected its Vice Chairperson. In 2011 she was the Shiromani Akali Dal candidate for Shiromani Gurdwara Parbandhak Committee from Mohali Constituency. In elections held on 18 September she defeated her rival by a margin of 3182 votes. She held the position of Press and Office Secretary of Shiromani Akali Dal (Women Wing).

== Achievements ==
She visited Germany in 2000 as a member of 11 member delegation of National Level consisting of rural as well as urban elected representatives and did comparative study of Local Government Institutions. She remained Member of State Advisory Committee of co-Operative Department, Government of Punjab, India, Member of District Grievances Redressal Committee, Mohali, Member of District Education Advisory Committee, Mohali. She was nominated as Member of Board of Management of Guru Angad Dev Veterinary and Animal Sciences University (GADVASU), Ludhiana in 2012 by His Excellency Shivraj Patil, Governor of Punjab. · She also participated in International Conference on Role of Jurists on Indo-Pak Harmony held from 29 September 2012 to 3 October 2012 in Pakistan.

== Women Commission ==
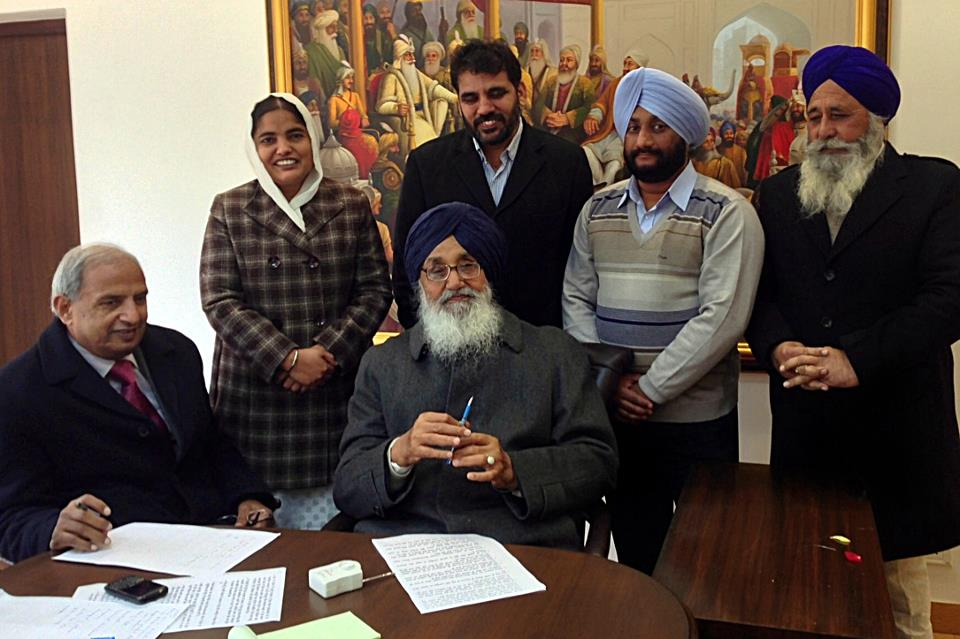
NK Sharma thanking Chief Minister Parkash Singh Badal for appointing Paramjit Kaur Landran as chairperson of Punjab State Women Commission along with Kulwant Singh, MD JLPL

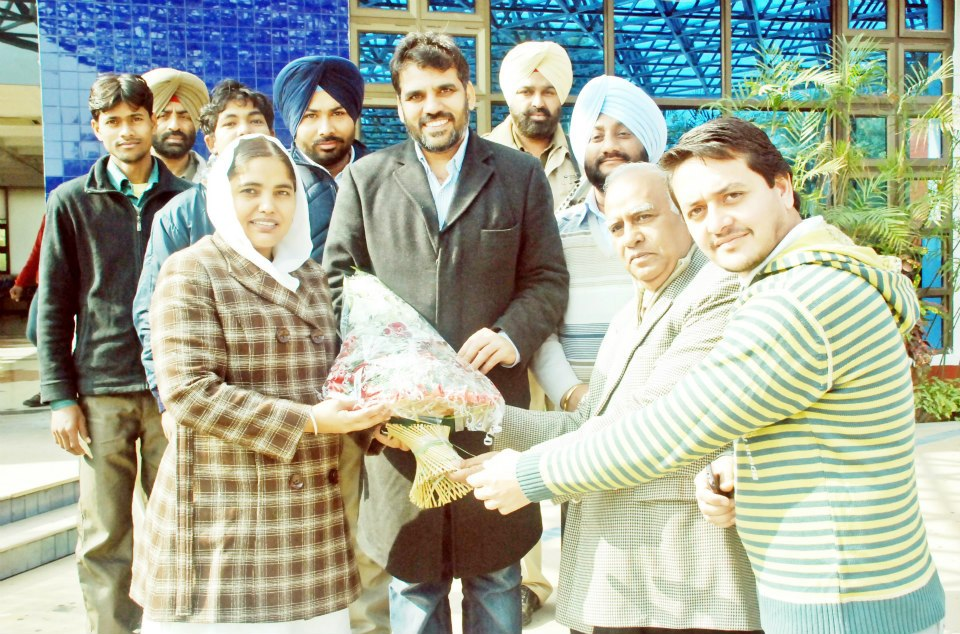
NK Sharma, Chief Parliament Secretary and Treasure, Shiromani Akali Dal and staff of Head Office Akali Dal congratulate Paramjit Kaur Landran on her appointment as chairperson of Punjab State Women Commission at Party Headquarters Chandigarh

Paramjit Kaur Landran was appointed chairperson of Punjab State Women Commission by the Government of Punjab, India led by Chief Minister Parkash Singh Badal on 3 January 2013. In her role as Chairperson, Paramjit Kaur Landran visited female inmates lodged at Patiala Central Jail on 11 March 2013 and heard their grievances and instructed the Jail Authorities to ensure that they are not deprived of their basic human rights. Later, she held a meeting of District Police Officials of Patiala and Fatehgarh Sahib Districts and also Inspected Women Police Station at Fatehgarh Sahib. On 8 May 2013 Punjab State Women Commission held a High Level Meeting of all the Women Cells of the State. While presiding over the meeting Paramjit Kaur Landran directed the Police Officers, Incharge of Women cells, in the State to solve the sensitive issues related to women on the priority basis. On 11, 12 and 26 July Women Commission organised courts for 12 districts to redress cases related to women issues at Jalandhar, Amritsar and Sangrur respectively. More than 50 cases of districts Jalandhar, Kapurthala, Nawan Sehar and Hoshiarpur came up for hearing at Jalandhar, about 50 cases of districts Amritsar, Tarn Taran, Gurdaspur and Pathankot were redressed at court held at Amritsar and more than 60 cases of districts Sangrur, Mansa, Bathinda and Barnala were redressed at court hearing held at Sangrur.
