= Kajheri =

Village and neighbourhood in Chandigarh, India

Kajheri कजहेड़ी
- Village
- Country: India
- Union Territory: Chandigarh
- District: Chandigarh

Government
  - Type: Panchayat / Municipal Corporation

Languages
  - Official: Punjabi, Hindi, English
- Time zone: UTC+5:30 (IST)
- PIN: 160052
- Vehicle registration: CH
- Website: Chandigarh Administration

Kajheri is a village and neighbourhood within the Union Territory of Chandigarh, India, located in Sector 52. It is officially listed among the villages under the Municipal Corporation of Chandigarh.

== History ==
Kajheri is a traditional village that predates the establishment of Chandigarh in the 1950s.

Over time, the village transitioned from agrarian livelihoods to semi-urban occupations, while retaining aspects of its original layout.

Kajheri has also been included in urban planning initiatives and development projects, such as anti-encroachment drives and the construction of community facilities.

== Significance ==
Kajheri offers an example of a village that has become enveloped by urban development in Chandigarh, yet still retains characteristics of village infrastructure and governance issues. It bridges rural-village administrative categories and urban municipal systems.

== Urban planning ==
- Kajheri is listed in the Chandigarh Master Plan 2031 under "Villages within the Sectoral Grid," meaning that while village lands remain, they are subject to urban development and integration of city infrastructure.
- Anti-encroachment drives have taken place in Kajheri to clear unauthorised constructions.

== Recent developments and issues ==
- In July 2025, a report highlighted dangers posed by loose high-voltage wires and poor roads in Kajheri (and other villages) as monsoon rains began, warning of potential fire or health hazards.
- Governance efforts include regular visits by municipal and civic officials to solicit resident grievances and plan improvements of internal roads and parks.

== Location ==
- Kajheri falls under the municipal limits of Chandigarh and is included in the list of villages within the city-territory.
- Its PIN code is 160052.
- The village is situated in Sector 52 of Chandigarh, adjacent to urban sectors and the bus terminal.
