= Homi Bhabha Cancer Hospital and Research Centre, New Chandigarh =

Hospital in Mohali, Punjab

Coordinates: 30.8183°N 76.7426°E

Homi Bhabha Cancer Hospital and Research Centre, New Chandigarh, Mohali, Punjab
- Type: Dedicated oncology hospital and research institute
- Established: 2022
- Parent institution: Tata Memorial Centre
- Director: Prof. (Dr.) Ashish Gulia
- Location: New Chandigarh, India
- Website: tmc.gov.in/hbchrc/

The Homi Bhabha Cancer Hospital and Research Centre is a 300-bed oncology hospital in New Chandigarh, Punjab. It has been built by the Tata Memorial Centre.

== History ==
The Punjab government granted 50 acres (20 ha) of land for construction of the hospital. The foundation stone for the hospital was laid in 2013 by Prime Minister Manmohan Singh. It was inaugurated on 24 August 2022 by Prime Minister Narendra Modi. The Director of the hospital is Dr. Ashish Gulia.

== Hospital Services ==
The hospital is a 300-bedded facility and has 11 departments including Medical Oncology, Surgical Oncology and Radiation Oncology to provide specialized quality oncology treatment to patients. Day care facility is available for chemotherapy. The department of Diagnostic and Interventional Radiology is equipped with 3T MRI, CT scan, Ultrasonography, Mammography and Digital X-ray unit.

== Health Schemes Available for Patients ==
1. Ayushman Bharat (Sarbat Sehat Bima Yojna) for up to an amount of Rs. 5 Lakh
2. Mukh Mantri Punjab Cancer Rahat Kosh Scheme for up to an amount of Rs. 1.5 Lakh

== Medical Research ==
Various interdisciplinary and multi-institute clinical trials and research in done at the hospital. 24 research projects are being done at the Institute as of August 2023.
