= Greater Mohali Area Development Authority =

State development authority in Punjab, India

- Department of Housing and Urban Development Govt of Punjab

Agency overview
- Formed: 1970
- Jurisdiction: Punjab
- Headquarters: Mohali
- Minister responsible: Department of Cooperation;
- Agency executives: Chief minister of punjab; Deputy chief minister of punjab
- Website: http://gmada.gov.in/

Greater Mohali Area Development Authority, shortly known as GMADA, is state development authority of Punjab State, India. Chief minister of Punjab is its chairman. GMADA has three functioning committees: executive committee, planning and design committee, and Budget and Accounts Scrutiny Committee. GMADA works in Mohali, Banur, Zirakpur, Dera Bassi, Kharar, Mullanpur Garibdass, Fatehgarh Sahib, Mandi Gobindgarh and Rupnagar

Prominent recent housing projects of GMADA are Aerocity, Aerotropolis and Ecocity.
