= Chandigarh Transport Undertaking =

Public transport unit in Chandigarh, India

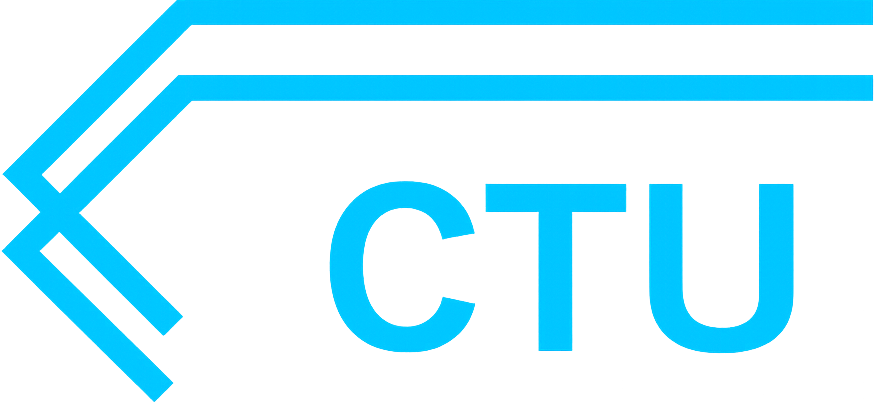
- Type: Public Sector Corporation under the Ministry of Transport, India
- Industry: Public Transport
- Founded: 1 Nov 1966
- Headquarters: Plot No. 701, Chandigarh Transport Undertaking, Industrial Area Phase I, Chandigarh, 160001, India
- Area served: Chandigarh, Punjab, Haryana, Himachal Pradesh, Jammu and Kashmir, Uttarakhand and Delhi
- Key people: Smt. Bhawna Garg, IAS, Secretary Transport; Sh. T.P.S Phoolka, PCS, Director Transport
- Products: Bus transport, Services
- Website: chdctu.gov.in

Chandigarh Transport Undertaking (CTU) is the public transport unit of the Chandigarh administration in India. It is managed by the Home Secretary, who acts as transport secretary and director. It operates a mixed fleet of AC, non AC, mini, midi, and Corona low floor buses. Almost all the buses have digital display and the routes, time of arrival, and stops of the buses can be found in the CTU Bus Guide app for Android phones.

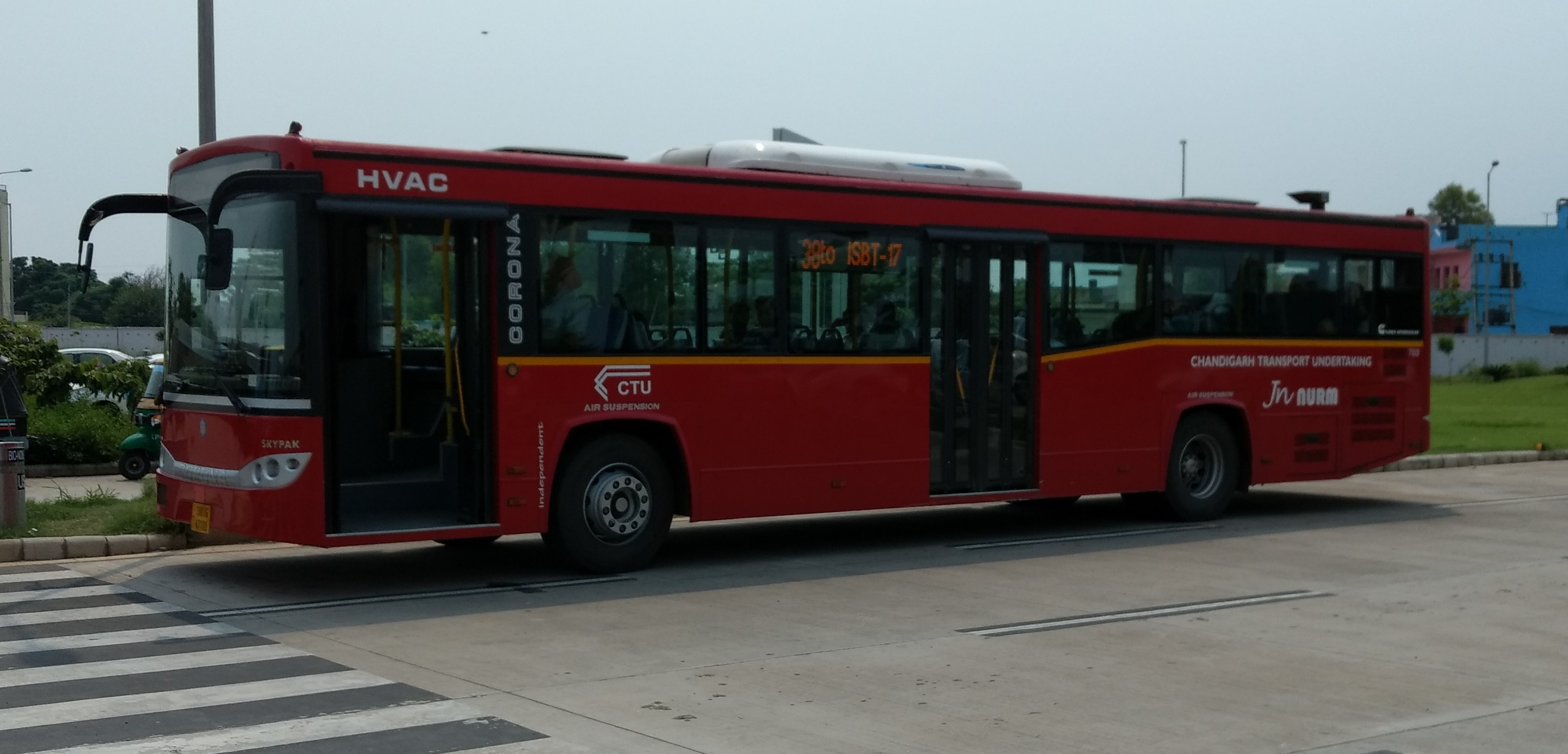
Chandigarh Transport Undertaking's Corona HVAC Bus

== History ==
Chandigarh Transport Undertaking came into existence on 01.11.1966 with a fleet of 30 buses, as a result of trifurcation of Punjab Roadways at the time of re-organisation of Punjab State.

== Fleet ==
CTU has 603buses, out of which 436 buses serve the Chandigarh region. The remaining 167 run on interstate routes covering Punjab, Himachal, Uttar Pradesh, Uttarakhand, Rajasthan, Delhi, Haryana and Jammu and Kashmir.

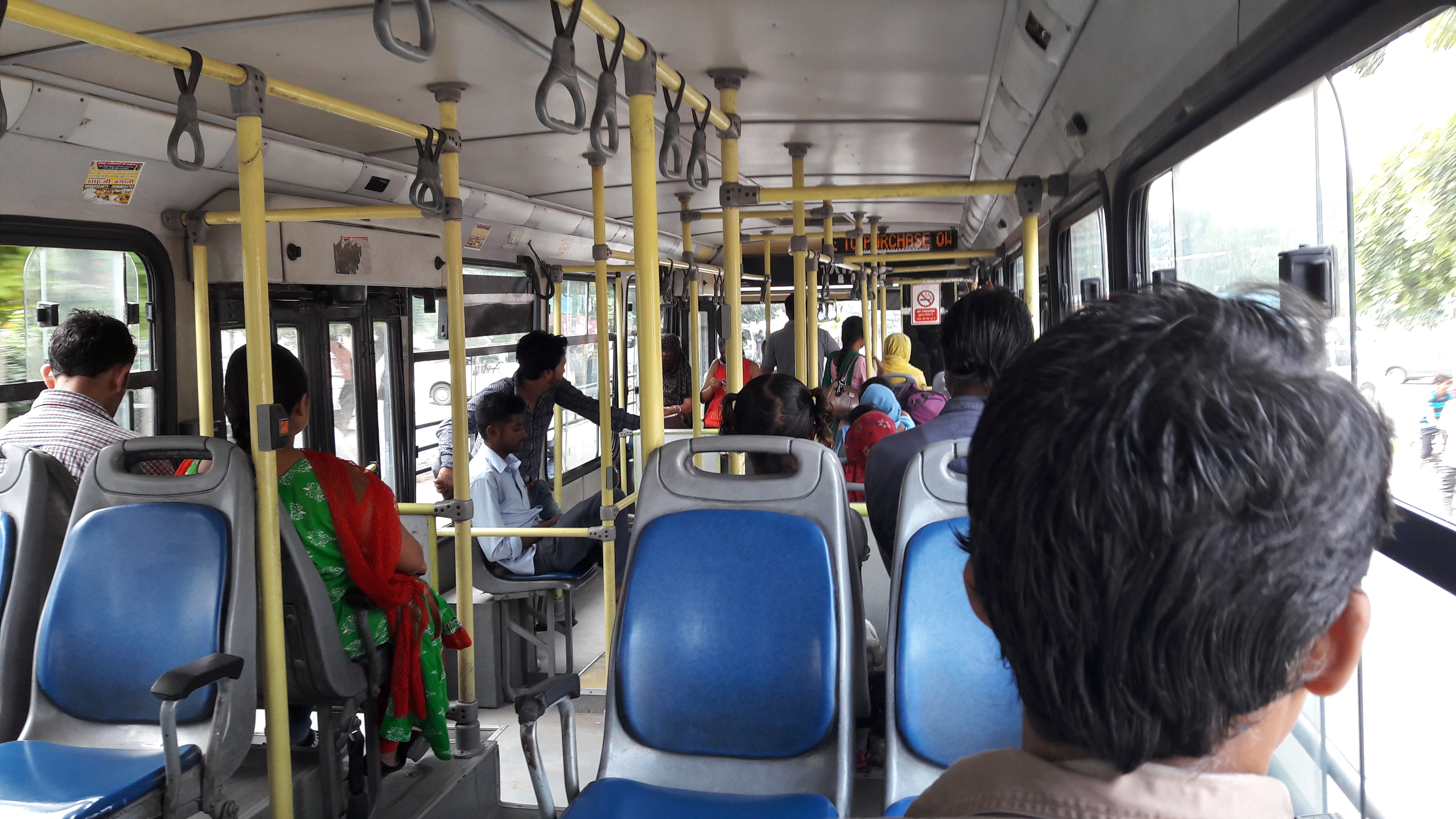
- SMS Based and IVRS system is installed for queries for estimated times of arrival of buses.

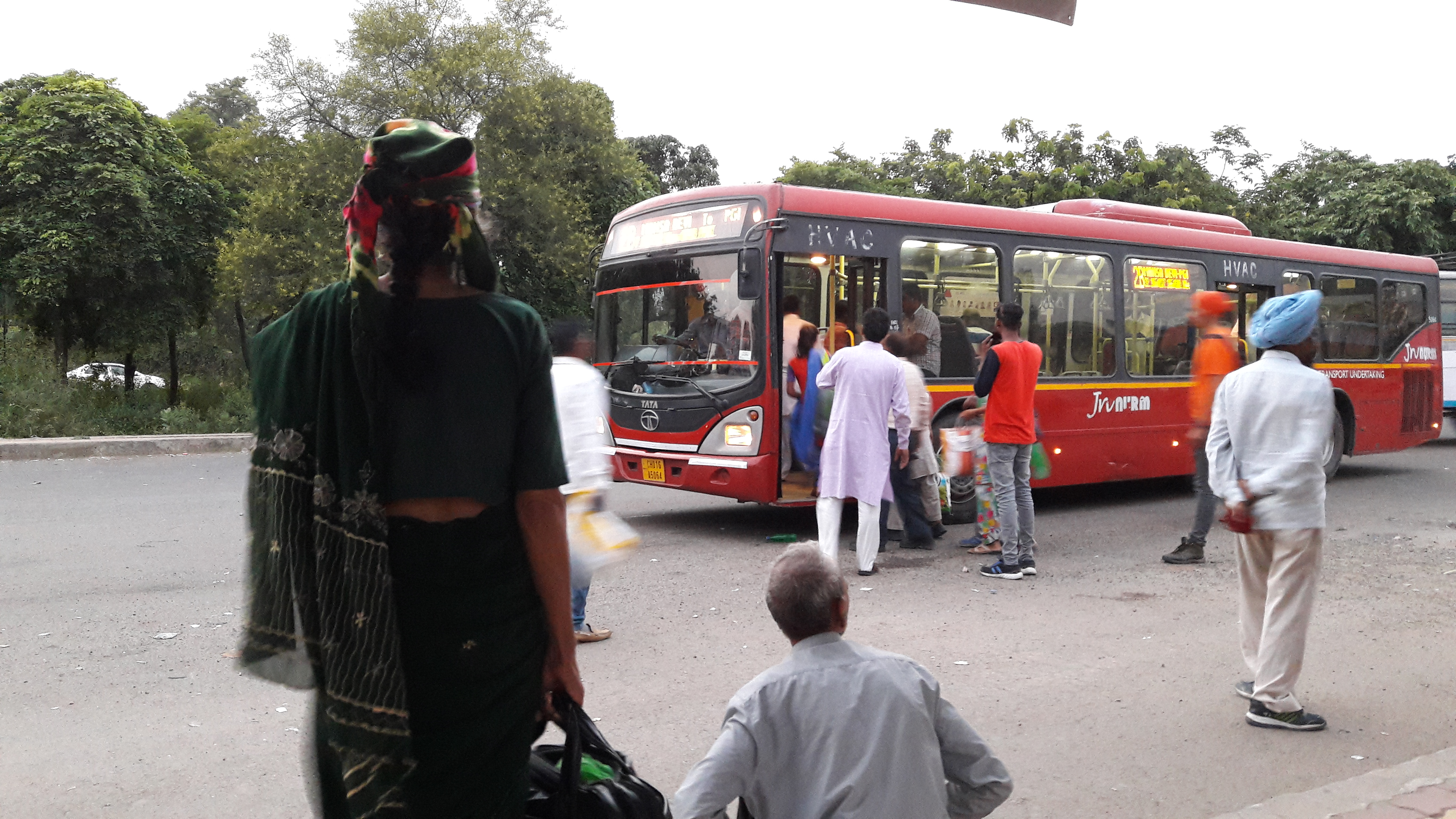
CTU bus

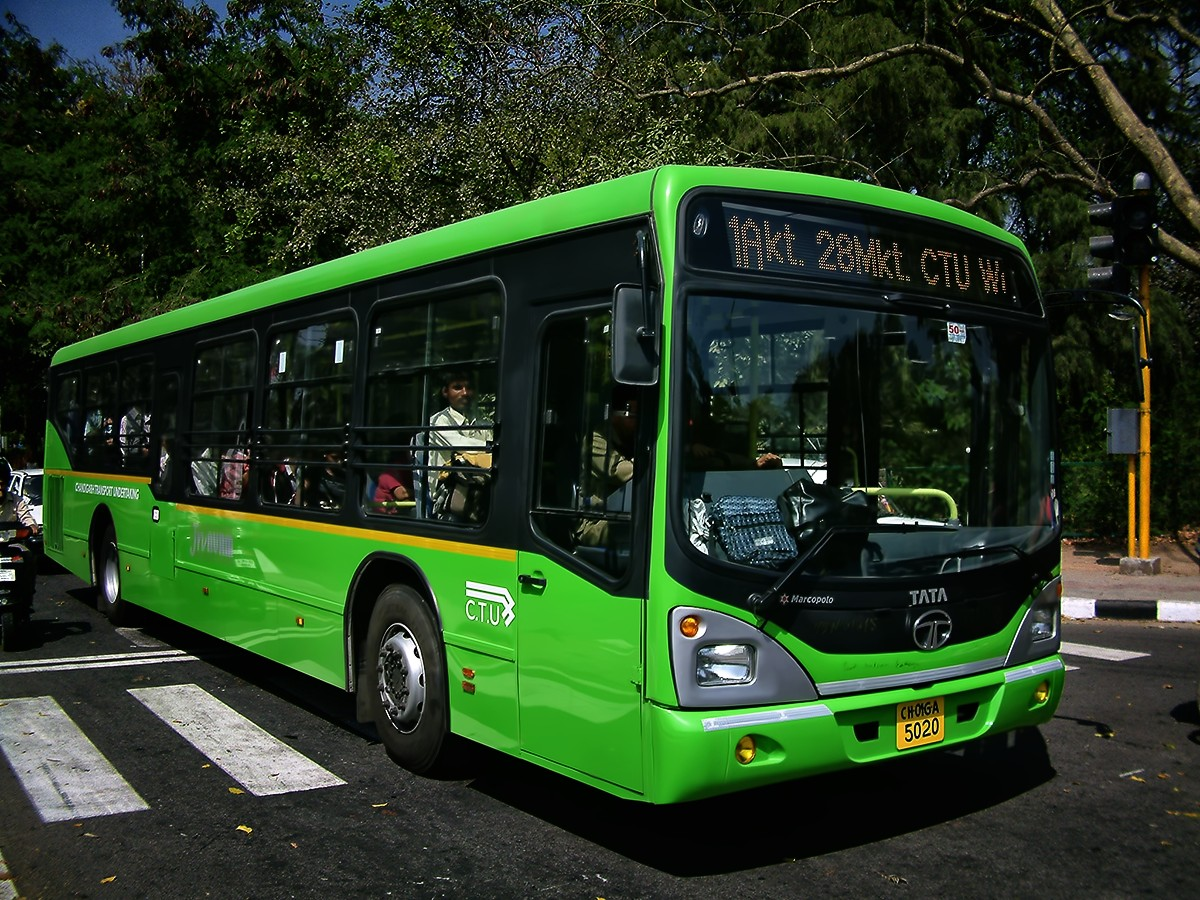
CTU's Tata Marcopolo Green Bus (Non-AC)

Chandigarh CTU Local Bus Routes and Timings
