= Chandigarh Airport =

Airport serving Chandigarh, India

Shaheed Bhagat Singh International Airport, Chandigarh
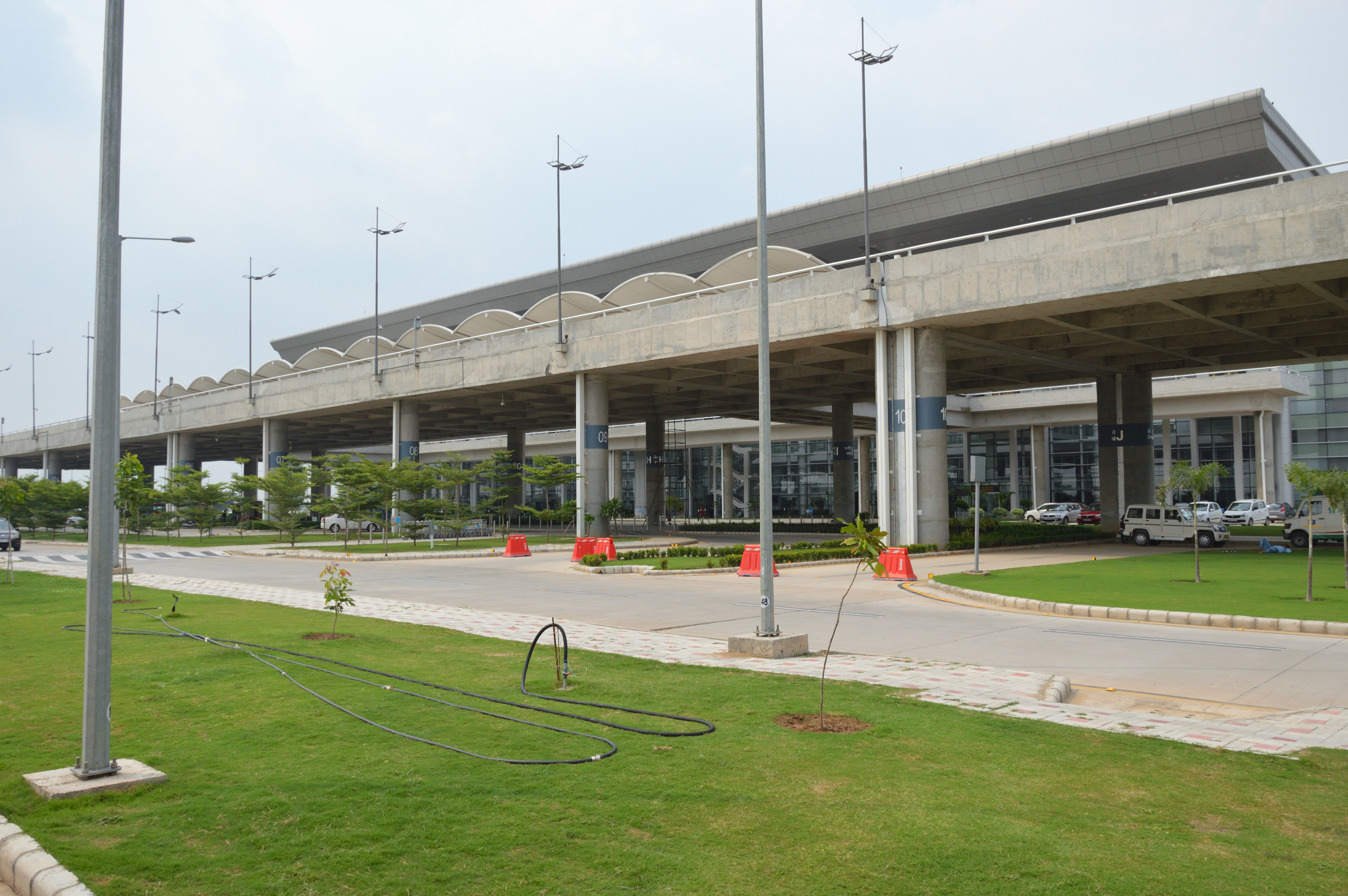
- IATA: IXC; ICAO: VICG

Summary
- Airport type: Military/Public
- Owner: Airports Authority of India
- Operator: Chandigarh International Airport Limited (CHIAL): Airports Authority of India (51%); Haryana Shahari Vikas Pradhikaran (24.5%); Greater Mohali Area Development Authority (24.5%)
- Serves: Chandigarh metropolitan region
- Location: Chandigarh, Punjab, India
- Focus city for: IndiGo
- Elevation AMSL: 314 m (1,030 ft)
- Coordinates: 30°40′29″N 76°47′26″E
- Public transit access: Chandigarh Transport Undertaking
- Website: Chandigarh Airport

Map
- Location of airport in Chandigarh IXC (Punjab) IXC (Haryana) IXC (India)

Runways
Direction	Length		Surface
Direction	m	ft	Surface
11/29	3,170	10,400	Asphalt

Statistics (April 2025 - March 2026)
- Passengers: 3,926,519 (▼5.4%)
- Aircraft movements: 26,395 (▼6.8%)
- Cargo tonnage: 14,512.6 (▲2.6%)
- Sources: AAI

Chandigarh Airport (IATA: IXC, ICAO: VICG), officially Shaheed Bhagat Singh International Airport, is an international airport serving the union territory of Chandigarh, India. The airport is located in Jhiurheri, Mohali, Punjab and shares space with the Indian Air Force. The airport caters to 17 domestic destinations and two international destinations. The airport is named after the freedom fighter Bhagat Singh. The airport is operated by CHIAL (Chandigarh International Airport Limited) which is a joint venture company between Airports Authority of India (51%), Government of Punjab (24.5%) and Government of Haryana (24.5%).

The airport was awarded as the 'Best Airport by Hygiene Measures' in the Asia-Pacific region in 2021, by Airports Council International.

== History ==
Chandigarh Airport operated all its civil and commercial operations from the civil enclave of the Indian Air Force Station. Indian Airlines started operating flights from Chandigarh to Delhi in the 1970s. A new airport building was constructed in the civil enclave and was opened on 14 April 2011. This air terminal was declared a customs airport on 19 August 2011, making it eligible for a limited number of international flights, but no international flight ever operated from this terminal.

In 2008, the Government of Punjab acquired 304.04 acres of land on the south side of the existing runway in Jhiurheri village at a cost of ₹452 crore (equivalent to ₹14 billion or US$140 million in 2026) to build the new terminal, which was completed in 2015 at a cost of ₹939 crore (equivalent to ₹15 billion or US$160 million in 2026). The Government of Punjab through GMADA and the Government of Haryana through HUDA each have a 24.5% stake and the Airports Authority of India holds the rest, a 51% stake in CHIAL the operator of the airport.

On 24 December 2015, the Mohali Industries Association filed a public interest litigation (PIL) in the Punjab and Haryana High Court for non-operation of international flights after spending ₹1,400 crore (equivalent to ₹23 billion or US$240 million in 2026) on the airport. After numerous hearings at Punjab and Haryana High Court and a long wait, IndiGo and Air India Express commenced flights to Dubai and Sharjah respectively in September 2016.

== Facilities ==
=== Terminal ===
The new terminal was inaugurated by Prime Minister Narendra Modi on 11 September 2015. The terminal was built by Larsen and Toubro and became operational on 19 October 2015.

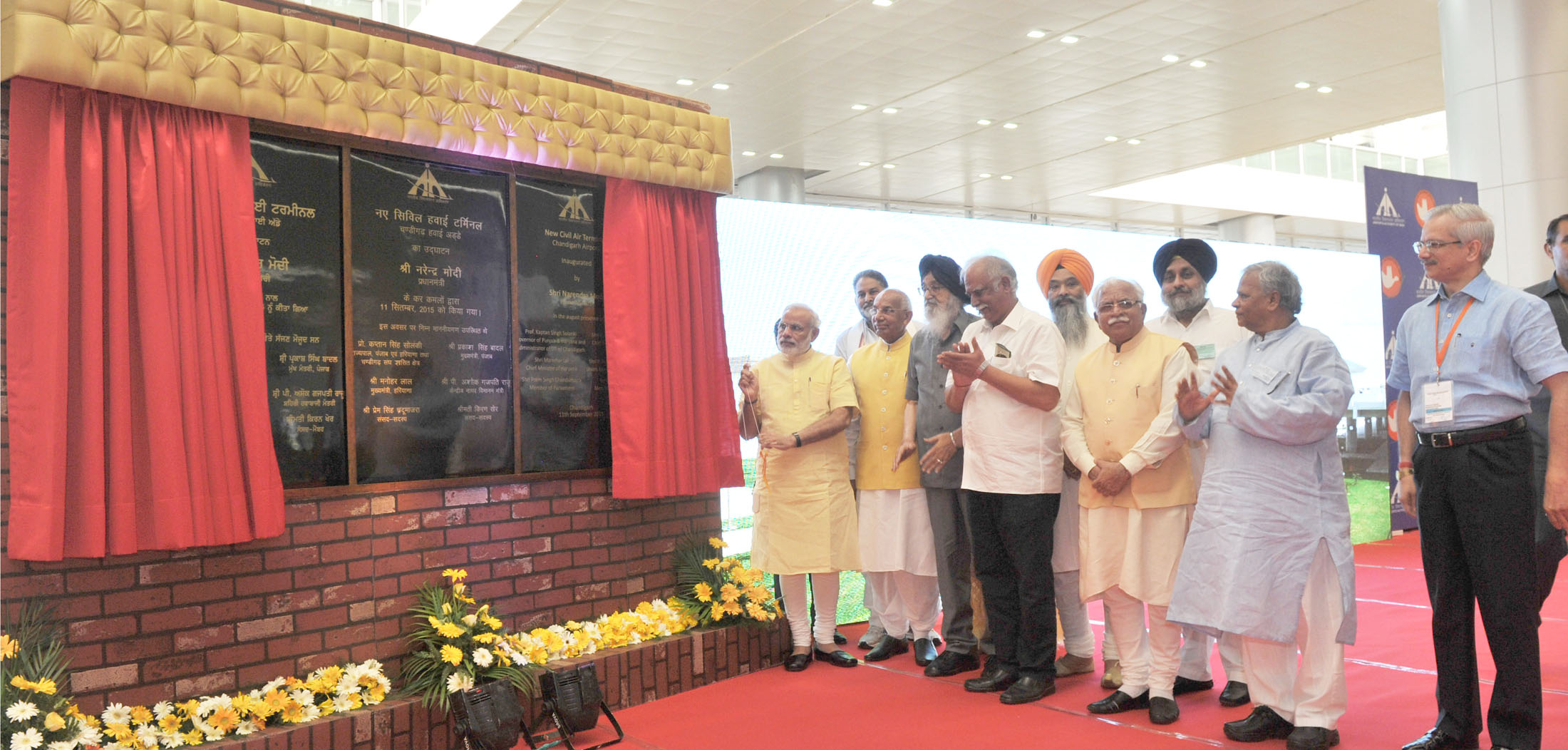
Prime Minister Narendra Modi inaugurating the new terminal on 11 September 2015

Construction of the new terminal included two link taxiways to the terminal and cargo complex. A new taxiway was added in April 2022 increasing the aircraft handling capacity to 20 per hour. The terminal has five bays with aerobridges and eight remote parking stands. The terminal covers 53,000 sq. metres with a capacity to handle 1600 passengers at a time and a parking space for 150 vehicles. The departures are on first floor and arrivals on ground floor. There is one ATM located in the parking area, WiFi inside the terminal, and one duty-free shop in the departures area.

=== Runway ===
The airport has single runway 11/29. From 2017, the runway went through a major upgrade and repair that was completed on 9 April 2019. The expanded runway with approach lighting is 12,400 ft (3,800 m) long with effective take-off length of runway 10,400 ft (3,200 m). Since 10 April 2019, the airport is available for 24 hour operations. Additional runway approach lighting in the touchdown zone was installed in 2021 to assist in landing during foggy weather.

=== Cargo terminal ===
The airport includes an integrated common use cargo terminal. The cargo terminal includes five buildings of 450 m^{2} (4,800 sq ft) each, with one building designated for perishable goods.

== Airlines and destinations ==
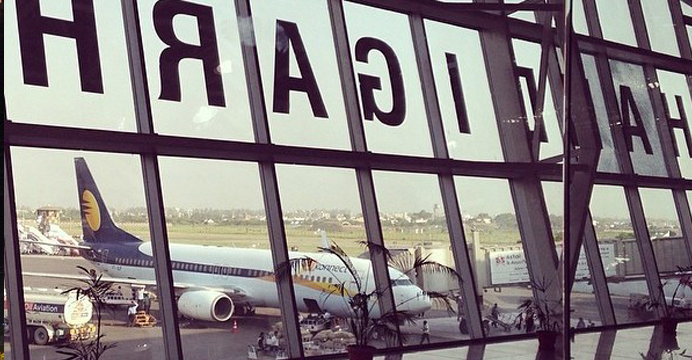
Boarding area of the airport, 2016.

Airlines	Destinations
Air India	Delhi, Leh
Air India Express	Bengaluru, Pune, Sharjah
Akasa Air	Bengaluru, Goa–Mopa
Alliance Air	Delhi, Hisar
IndiGo	Abu Dhabi, Ahmedabad, Chennai, Delhi, Dharamshala, Dubai–International, Indore, Jaipur, Jammu, Lucknow, Mumbai, Noida, Patna, Srinagar

== See also ==
- List of airports in India
