= RBU =

RBU may refer to:

- RBU (radio station), a longwave time signal
- RBU-6000 Smerch-2, a 213 mm caliber Soviet anti-submarine rocket launcher
- Rabindra Bharati University, Kolkata, West Bengal, India
- Ramdeobaba University, Nagpur, Maharashtra, India
- Rayat-Bahra University, Punjab, India
- Rock Band Unplugged, a video game
