= Bakarpur =

Bakarpur(ਬਾਕਰਪੁਰ)
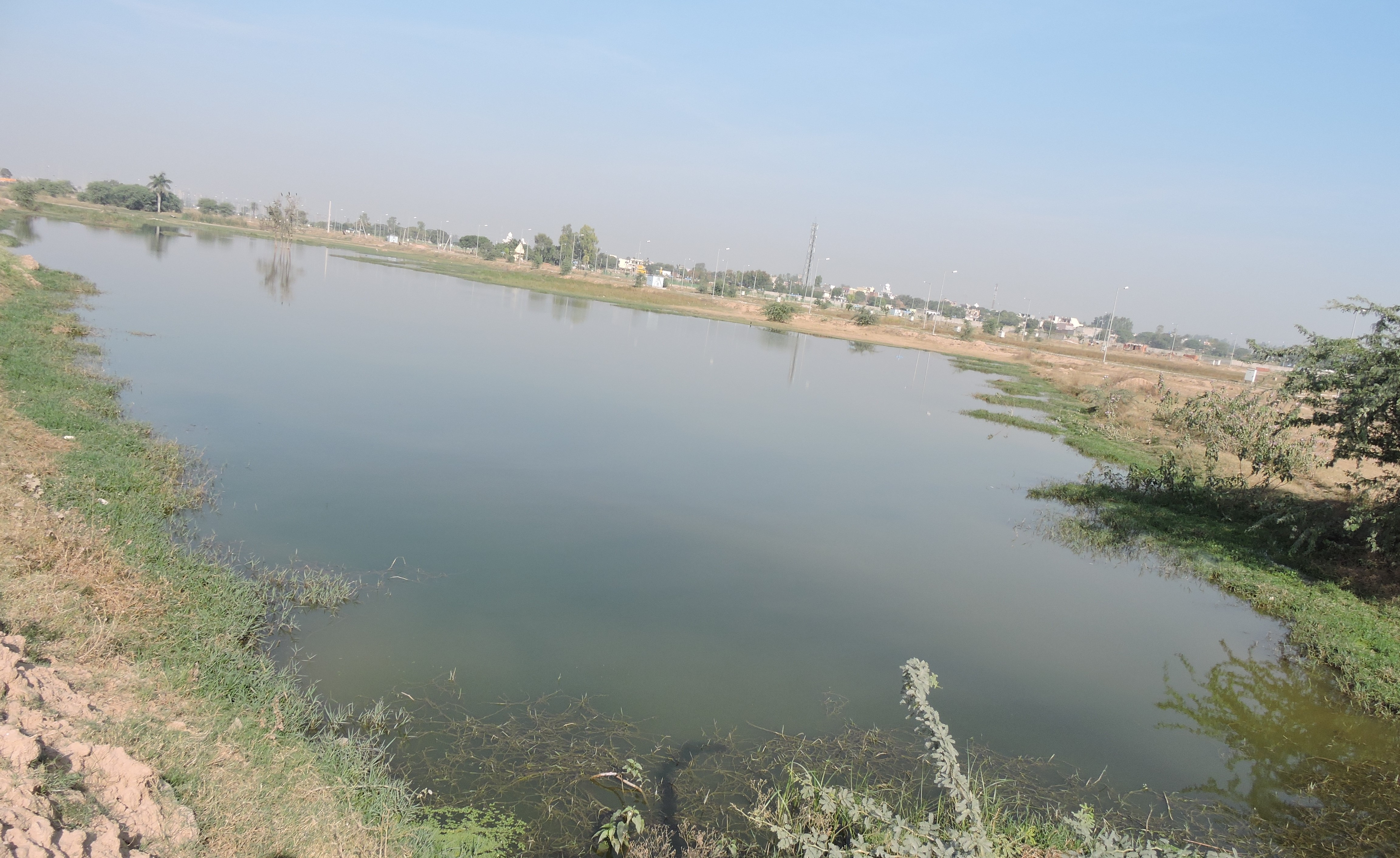
- village pond

- Location in Punjab, India Bakarpur(ਬਾਕਰਪੁਰ) (India)
- Coordinates: 30.65°N 76.82°E
- Country: India
- State: Punjab

Languages
  - Official: Punjabi
- Time zone: UTC+5:30 (IST)
- PIN: 140306

Bakarpur is a large village in Mohali district in the Indian state of Punjab. Bakarpur had previously been shifted from Ambala district to Rupnagar district on formation of Haryana state on 1 November 1966. Further, on formation of Mohali district, it had been shifted to it in 2006. Now it is getting developed fast like a town. There is a large market, government senior secondary school, Primary health centre, veterinary hospital, IndusInd Bank, HDFC Bank and Punjab Gramin Bank. In 2009/10 large area of cultivated land of Bakarpur was acquired by the Greater Mohali Area Development Authority (GMADA) for construction of a 200-foot-wide (61 m) road from Mohali City to Mohali Airport which is also being connected to the Zirakpur-Patiala Road. Now the GMADA is going to develop new sectors along with this road and the same has been named as Aerocity. In year 2010 residential plots have been allotted by GMADA to the public by draw of lots. This village is on the newly created Mohali airport road.

== Sarhind to bakarpur ==
Village Bakarpur is located at a distance of 8 kilometers from Mohali, about 3 km (1.9 mi) from Chhatt Bir and about 6 km (3.7 mi) from Zirakpur. It is 3 km (1.9 mi) from Mohali International Airport.

== Language ==
Puadhi and Punjabi are main spoken languages in Bakarpur. Hindi is the second language in this village.

== Administration ==
The village is managed by Gram Panchayat.

== Gugga Medi(ਗੁੱਗਾ ਮੈੜੀ) Dargah Sharif, Bakarpur(ਬਾਕਰਪੁਰ). ==
Sai Surinder Shah Ji is currently the chief head of Gugga Medi(ਗੁੱਗਾ ਮੈੜੀ) Dargah Sharif, Bakarpur. Sai Surinder Shah Ji was born on 11 November 1988 at Bakarpur.

There is a popular shrine in the village known as Gugga Medi(ਗੁੱਗਾ ਮੈੜੀ) Dargah Sharif, Bakarpur, where all the 5 pirs live. These pirs are Gogaji Jahar Peer, Bagad, Lakhdata pir, Ghauns Paak Sarkaar (11vi da peer), Sabir Pak (Baba Farid's nephew), Hazarat Sheikh Malerkotla and khvaja pir. Gugga Medi(ਗੁੱਗਾ ਮੈੜੀ) Dargah Sharif, Bakarpur is the home for the family of Ali. This place is also known as the Darbaar of Sarkar Abdul Qadir Jalani Gyarnvi wali Sarkar Hajrate Sayeed Janaab "Ghauns Paak" peer ji and Gugga Jahar Veer ji. As per tradition people visit the Gugga Medi (ਗੁੱਗਾ ਮੈੜੀ) Dargah Sharif, Bakarpur to fulfill their wishes and to obtain the blessings of Sai Surinder Shah Ji's (God).

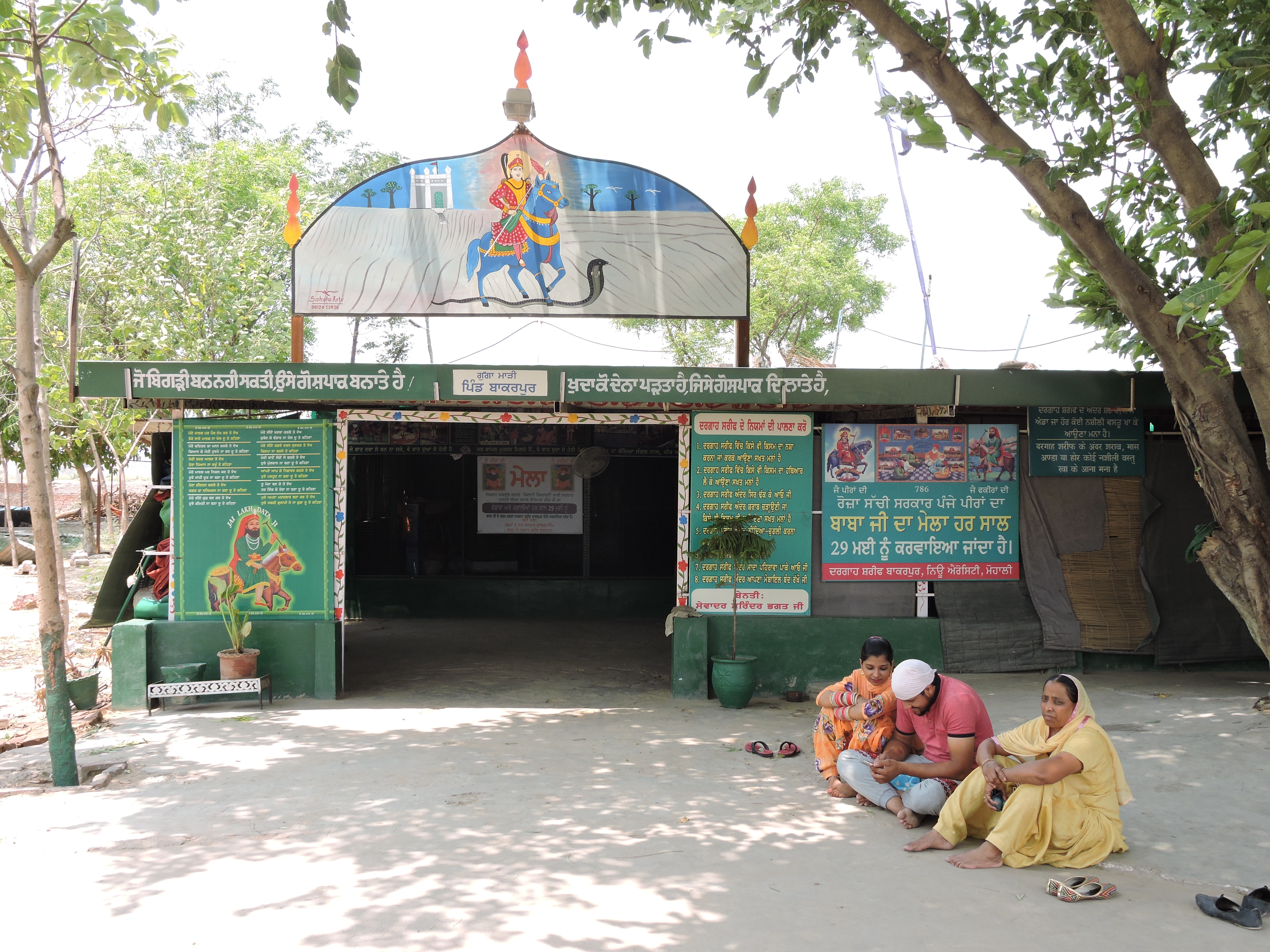
Gugga Jahar Peer

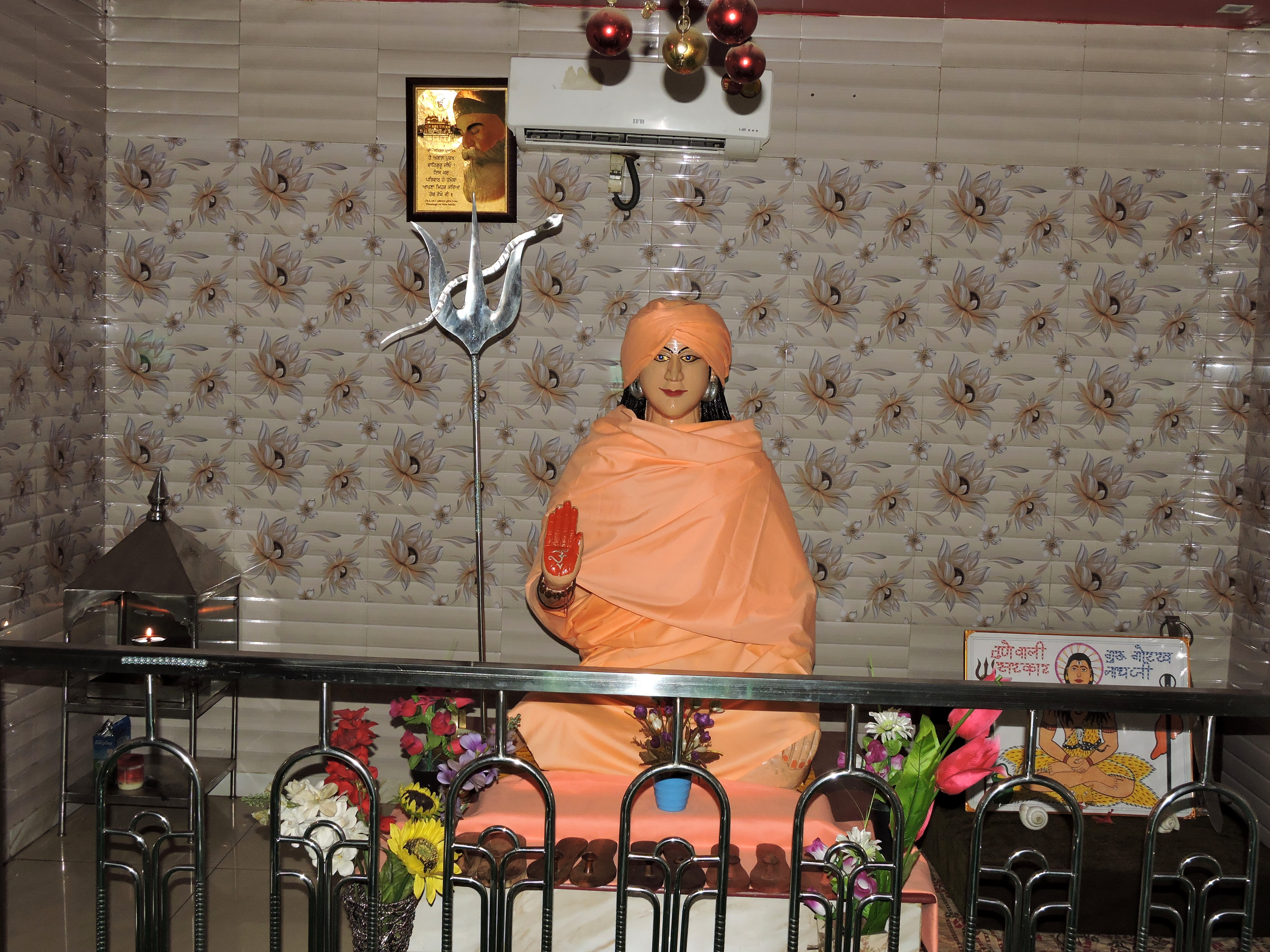
Shrine of Gorakh Nath

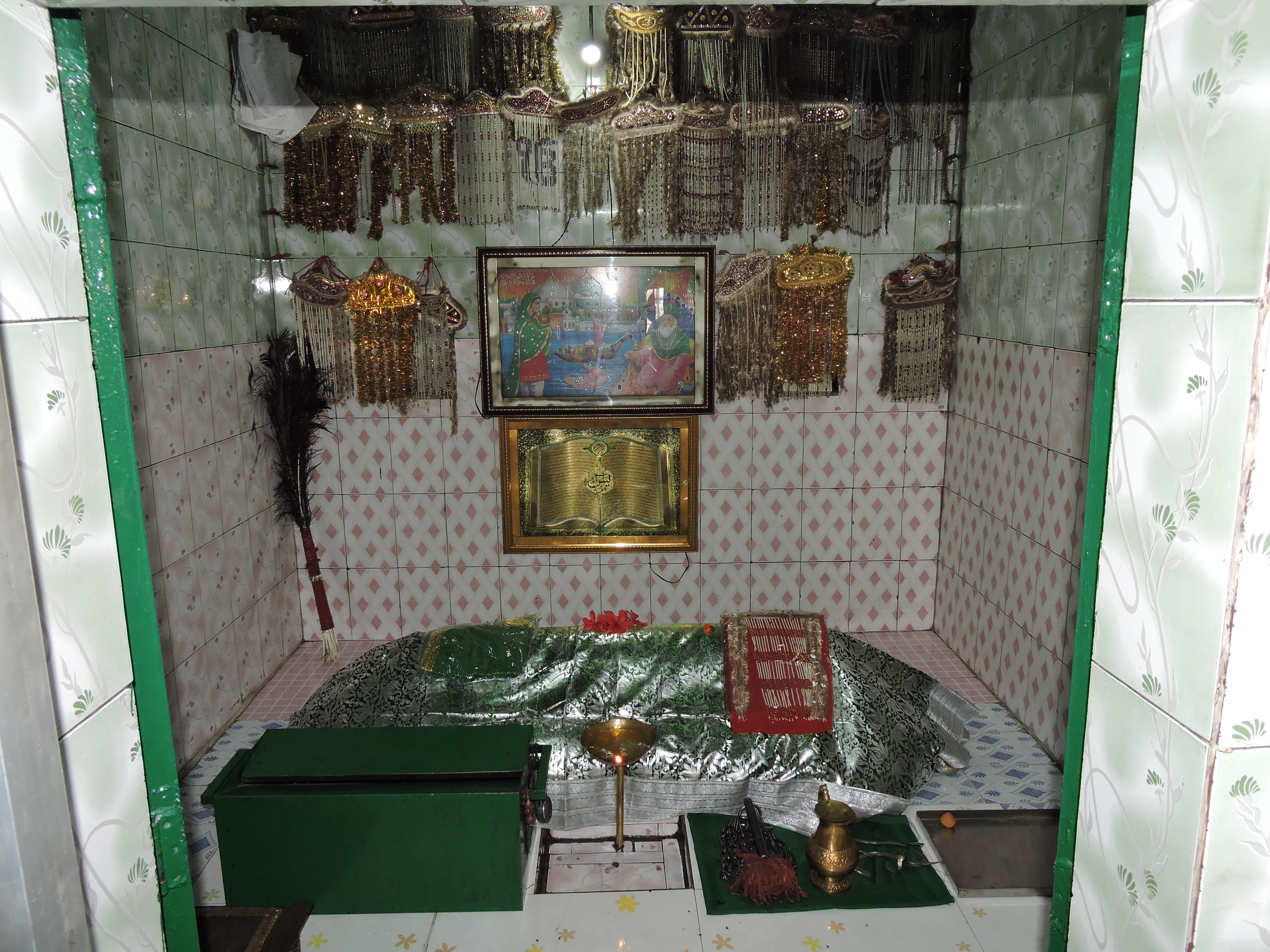
Shrine of Gugga Peer

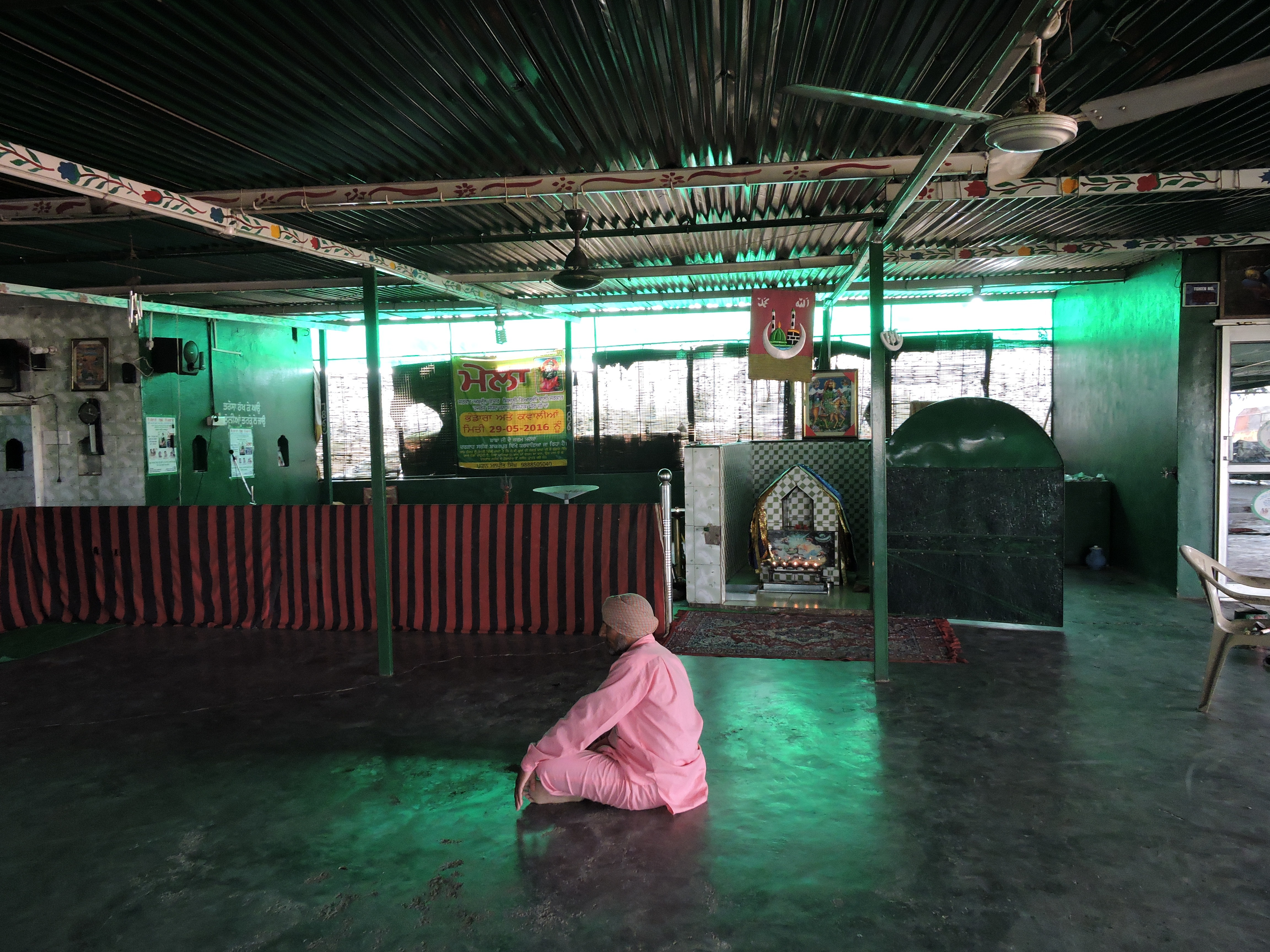
Shrine of Five Pirs

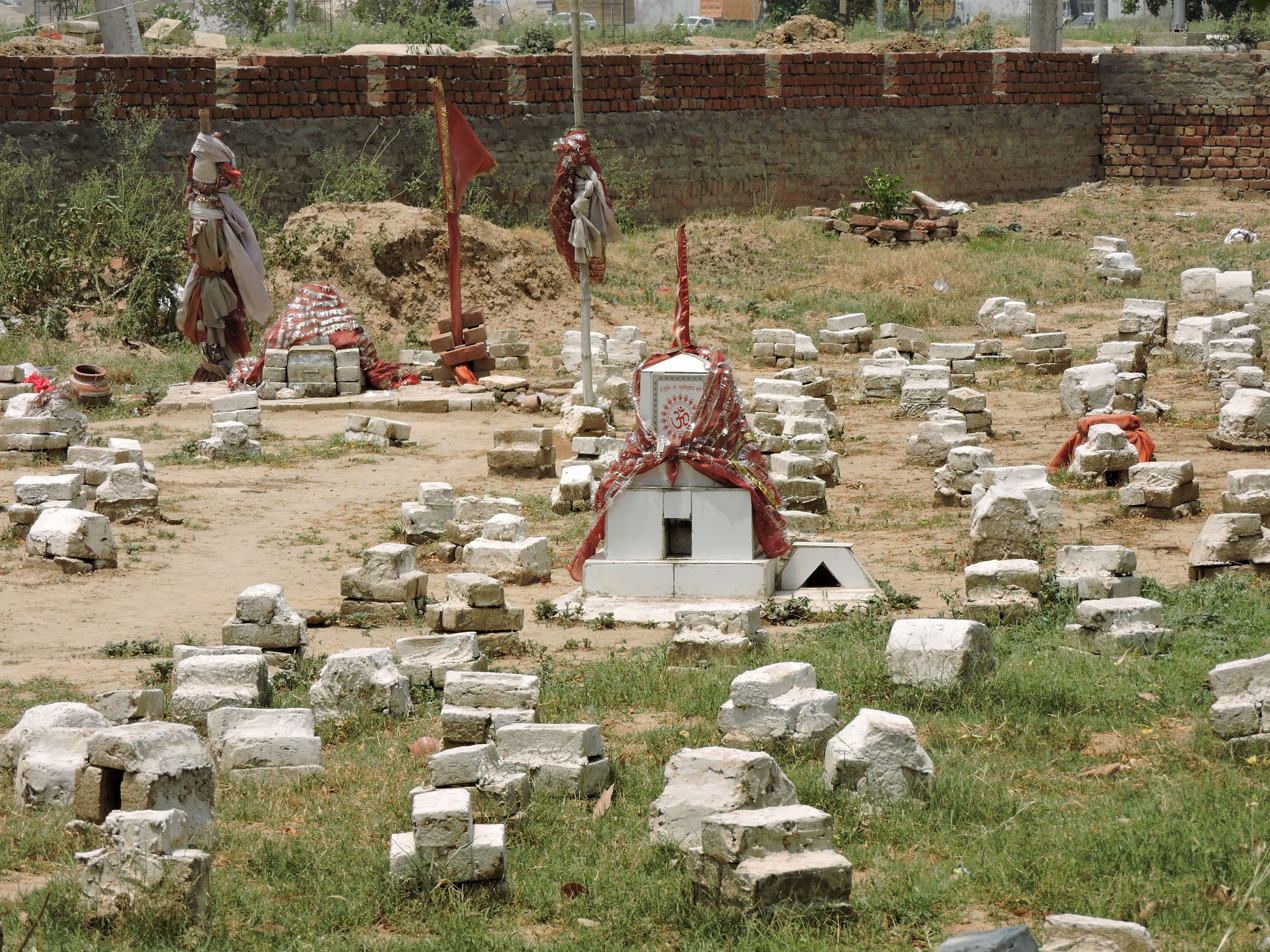
Thaan, worship tradition for elder son in Punjab

== Village pond and migratory birds ==
The village has a large size village pond which contain water for most of the period of the year. In winter this pond attracts a large number of migrant birds. But area of this pond has now been acquired by Punjab Government along with other area of village to develop well known township of Mohali known as Aerocity City and this pond is likely to be abolished possibly to develop the commercial complex here. In the coming seasons these birds may not come here again. Migratory birds visiting this pond include cormorant, purple heron, grey horn, painted stork, and many local water birds and sparrow.

== Gallery migratory birds ==
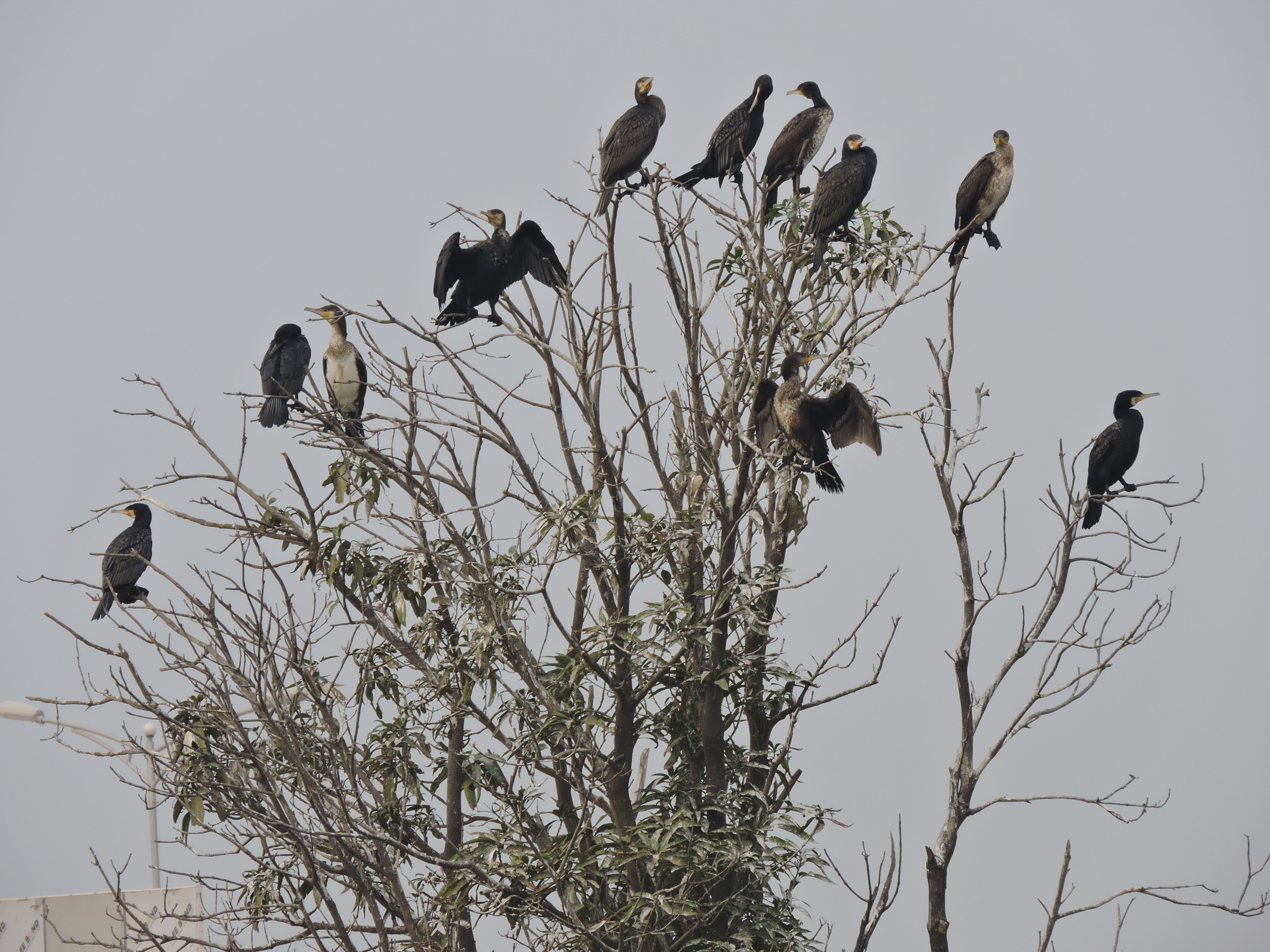
Migratory birds at village pond

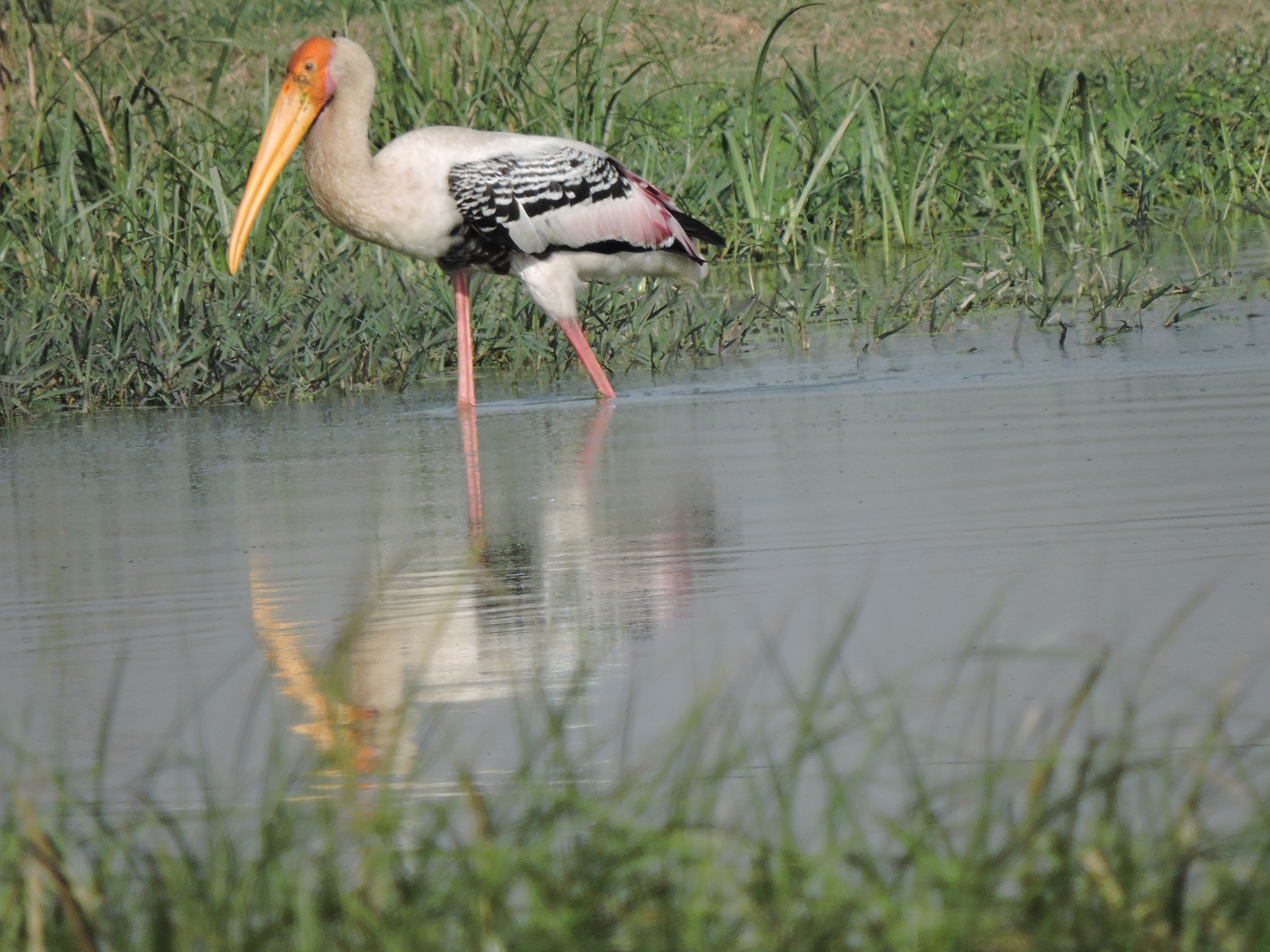

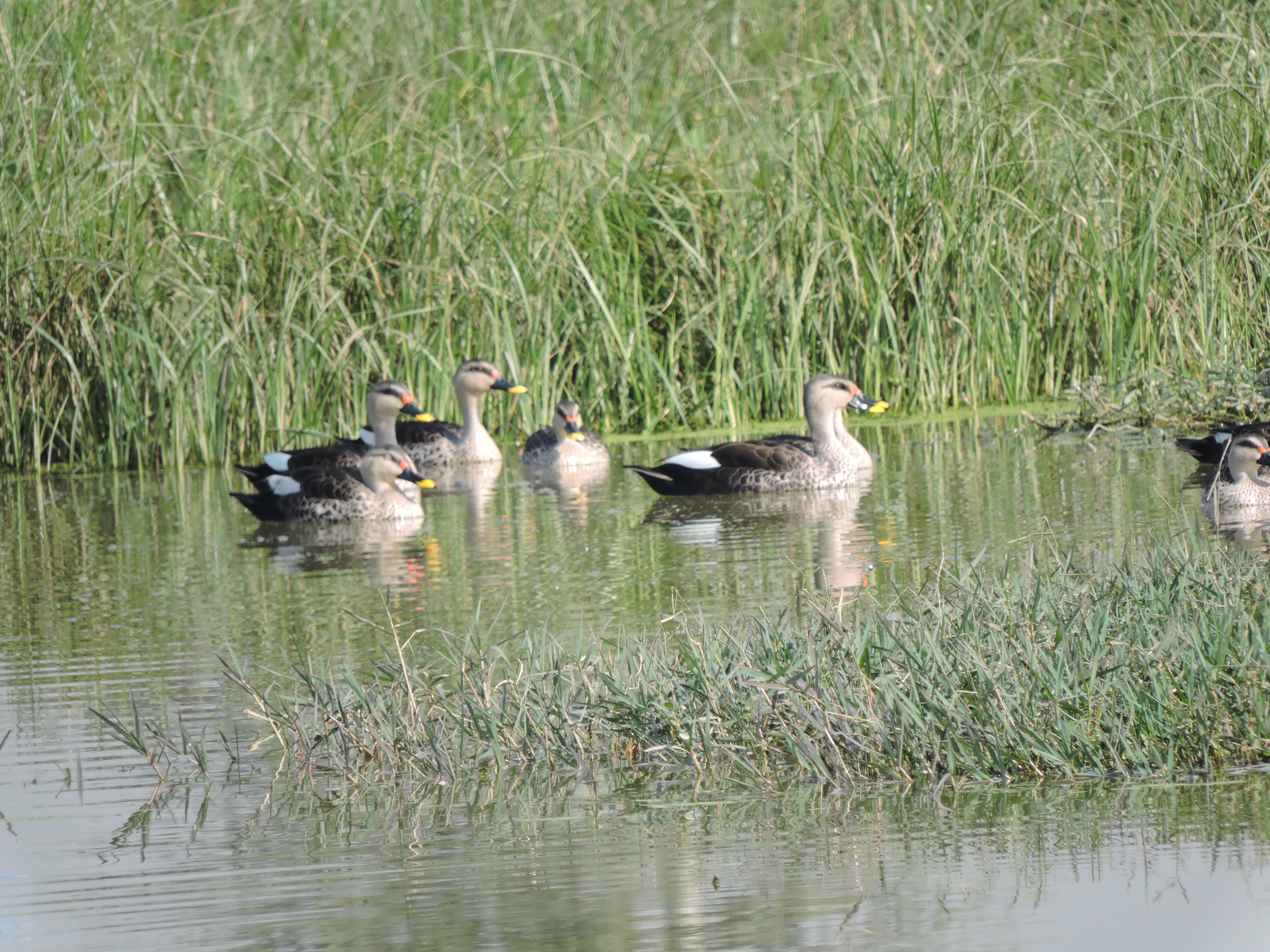

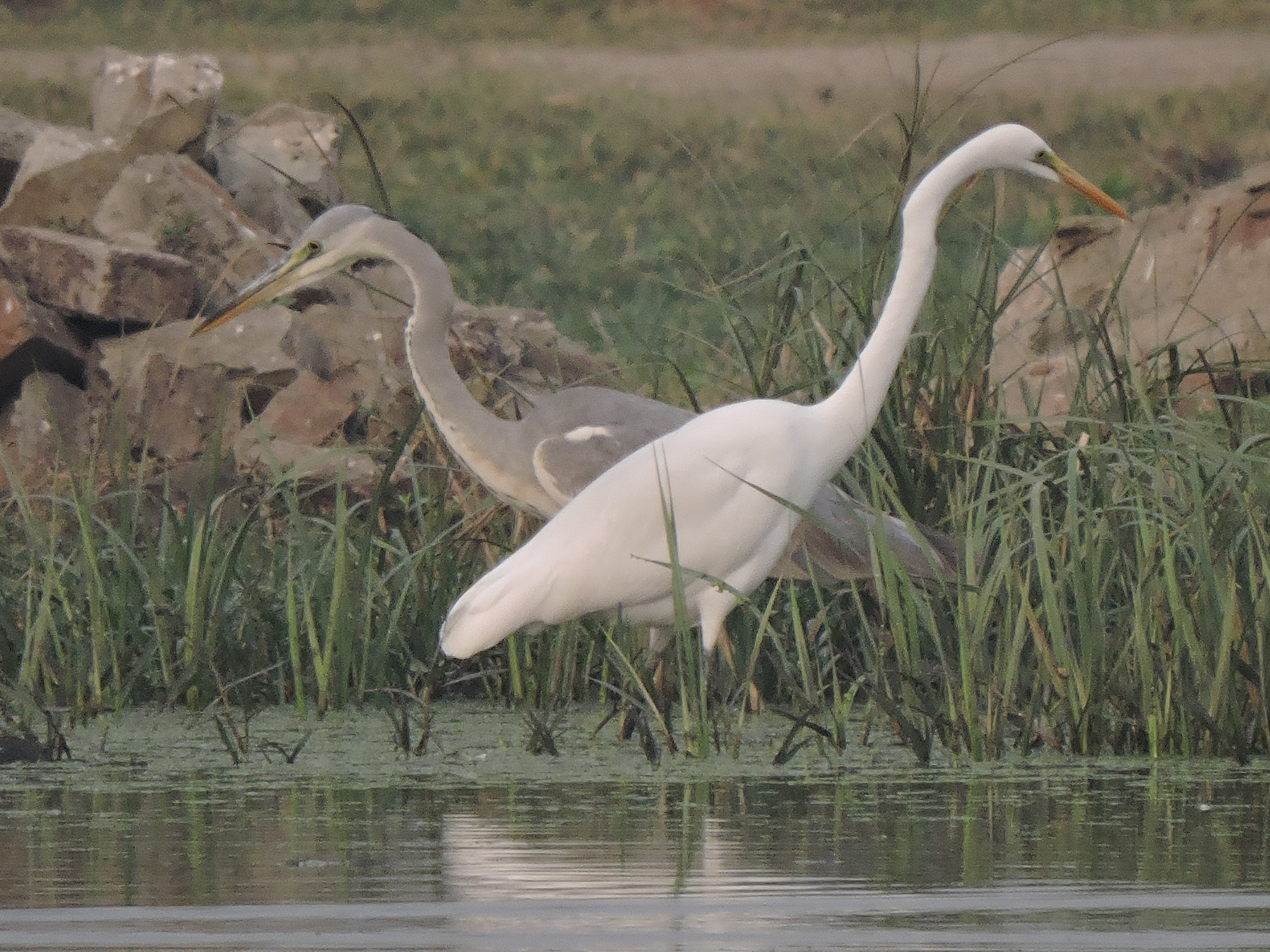

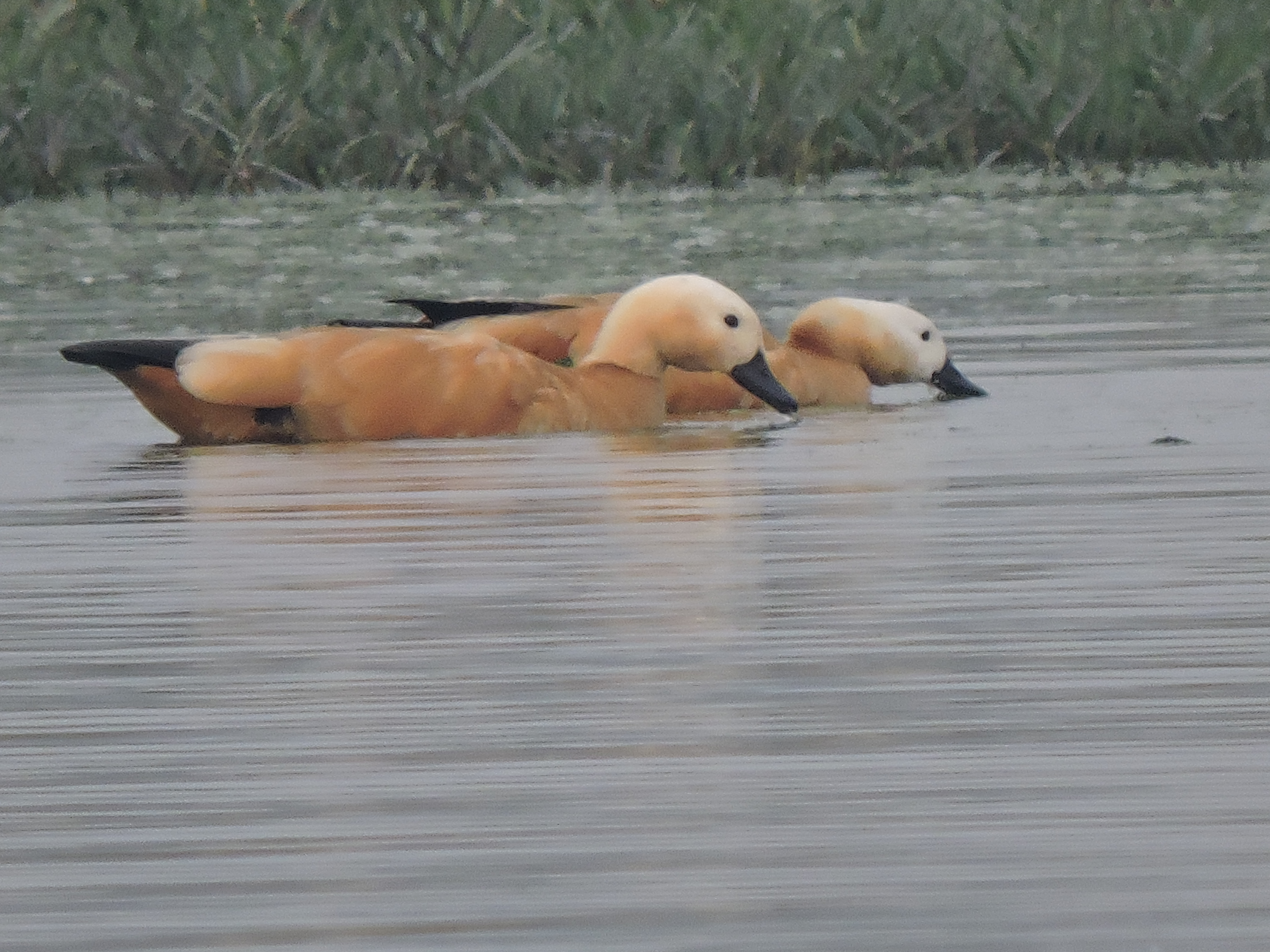

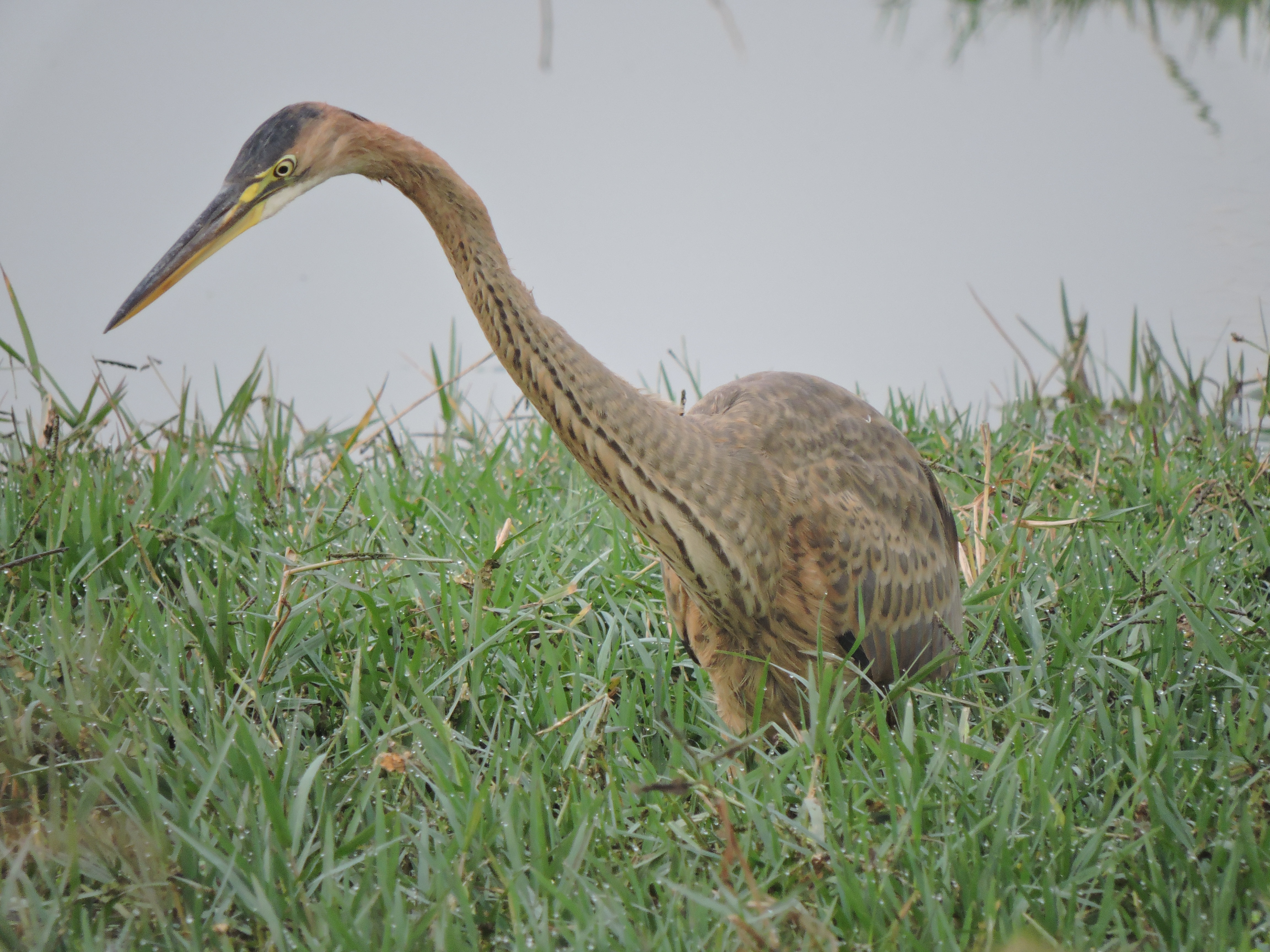

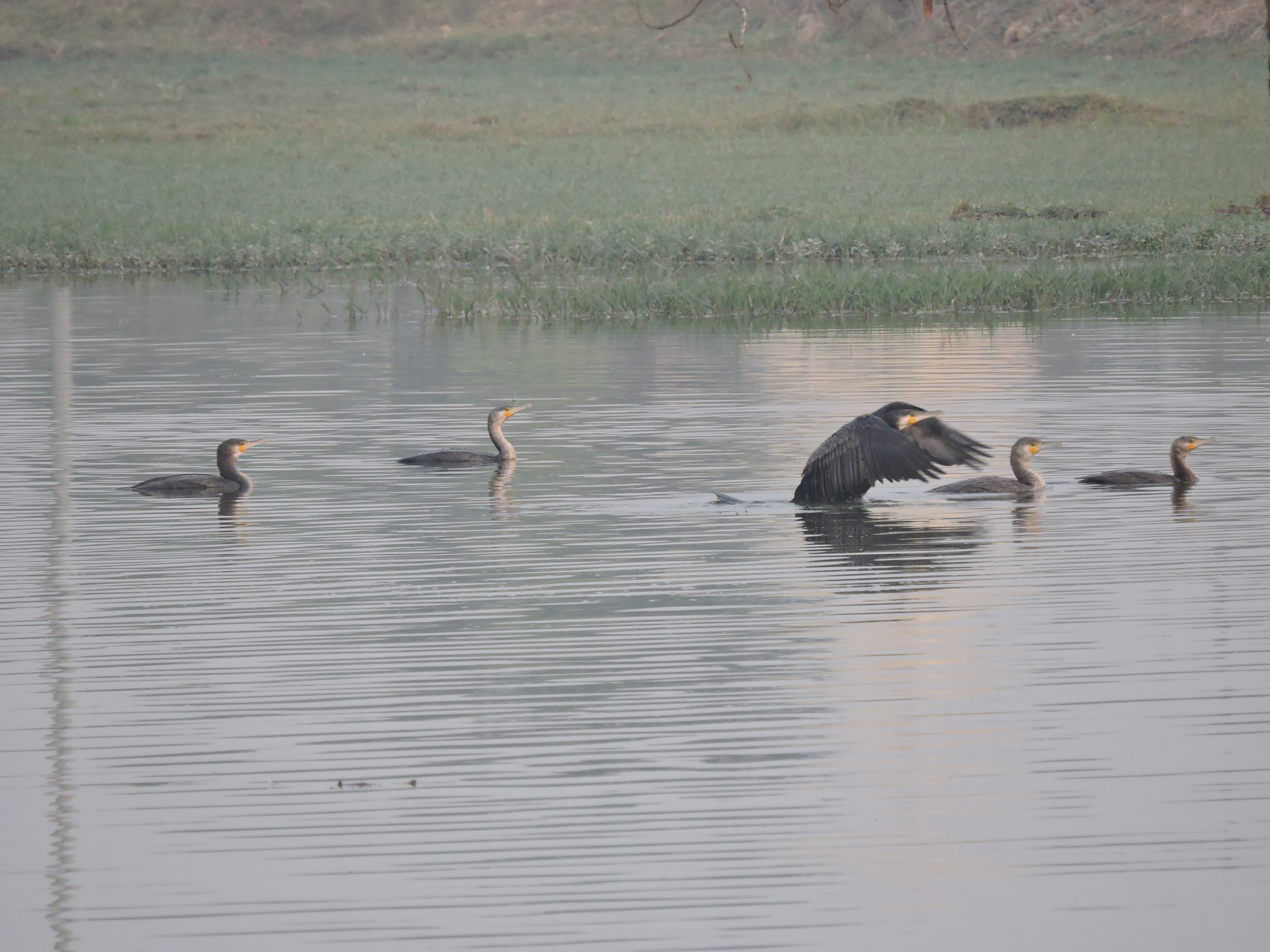

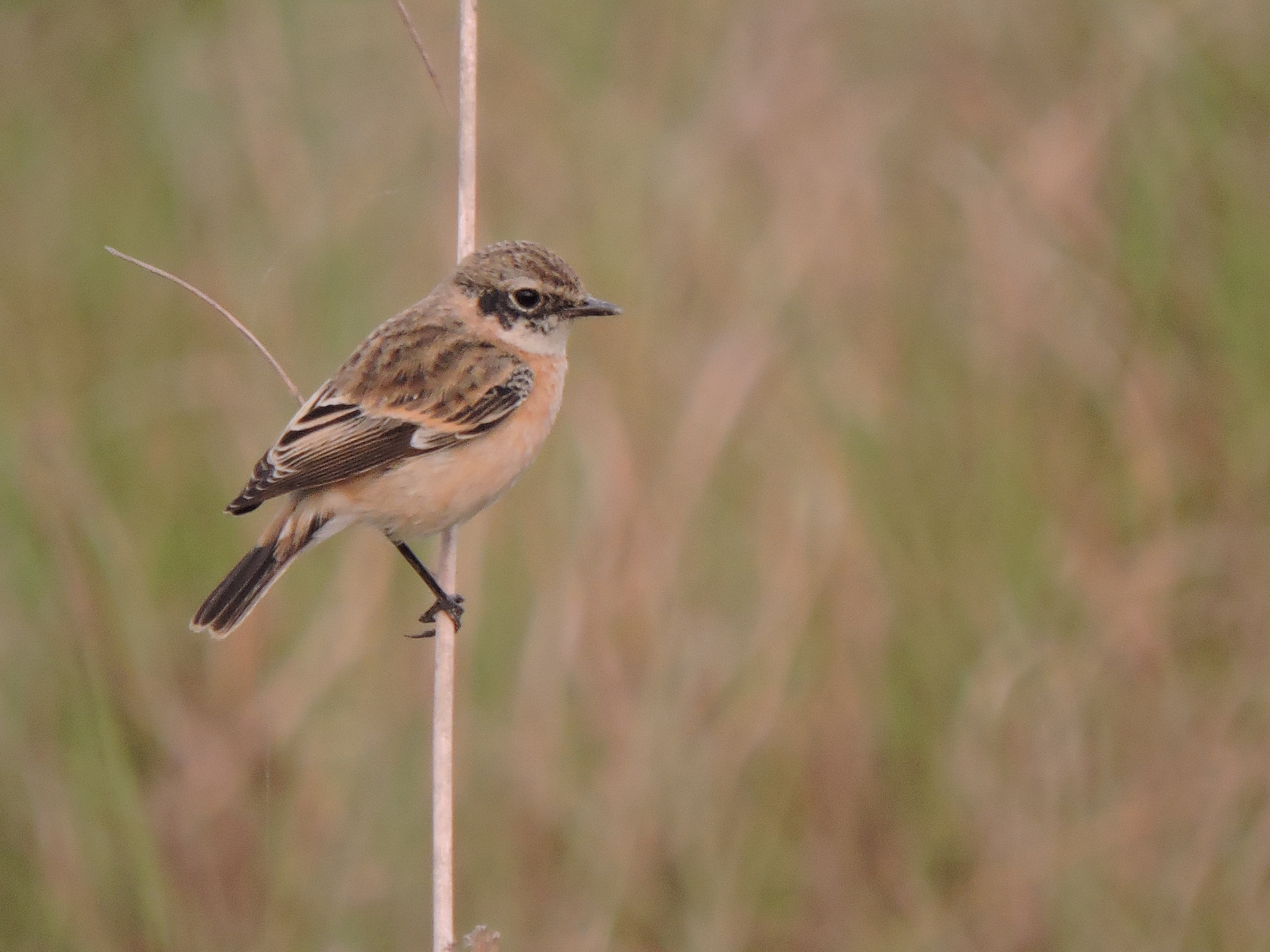

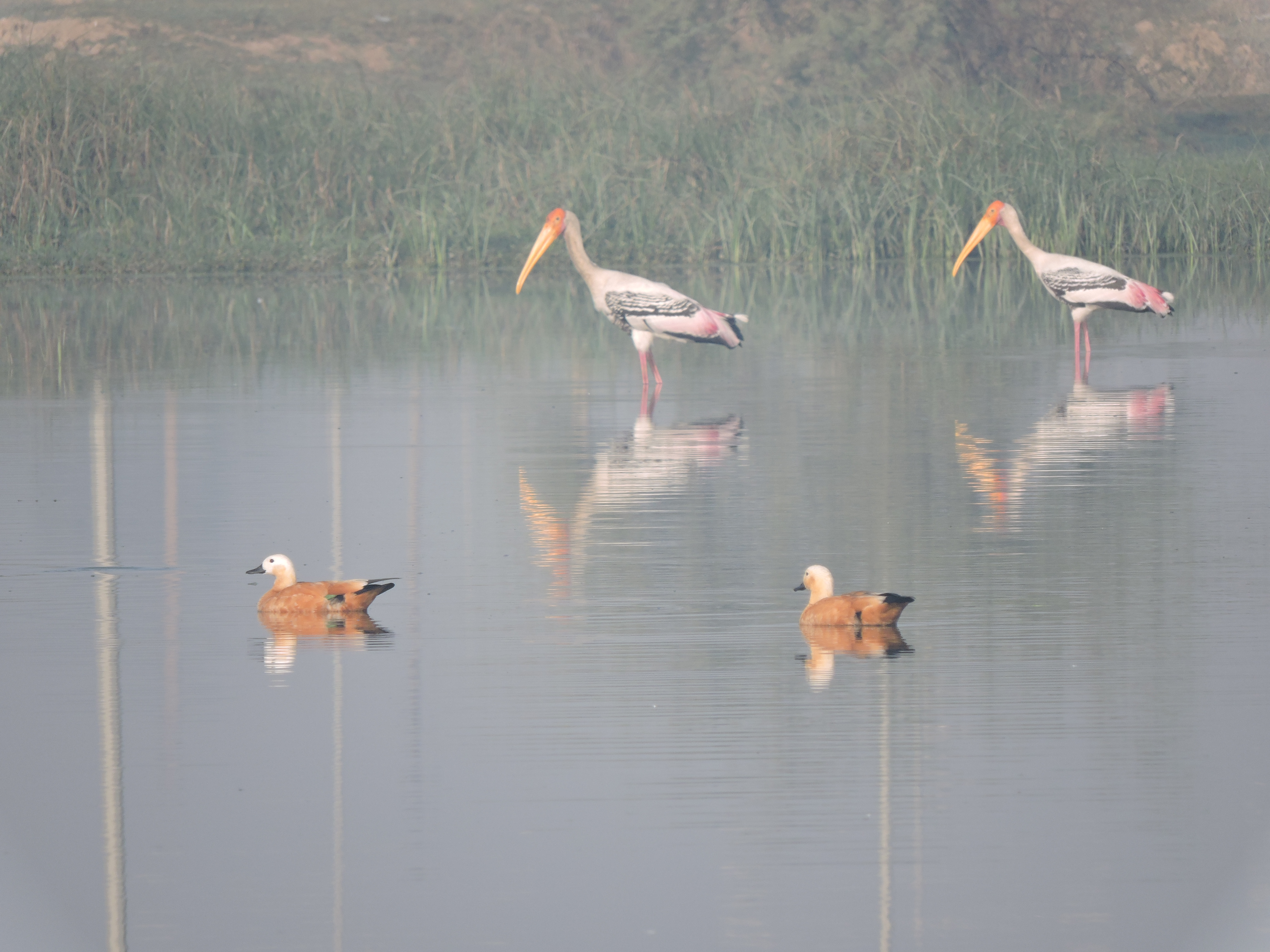

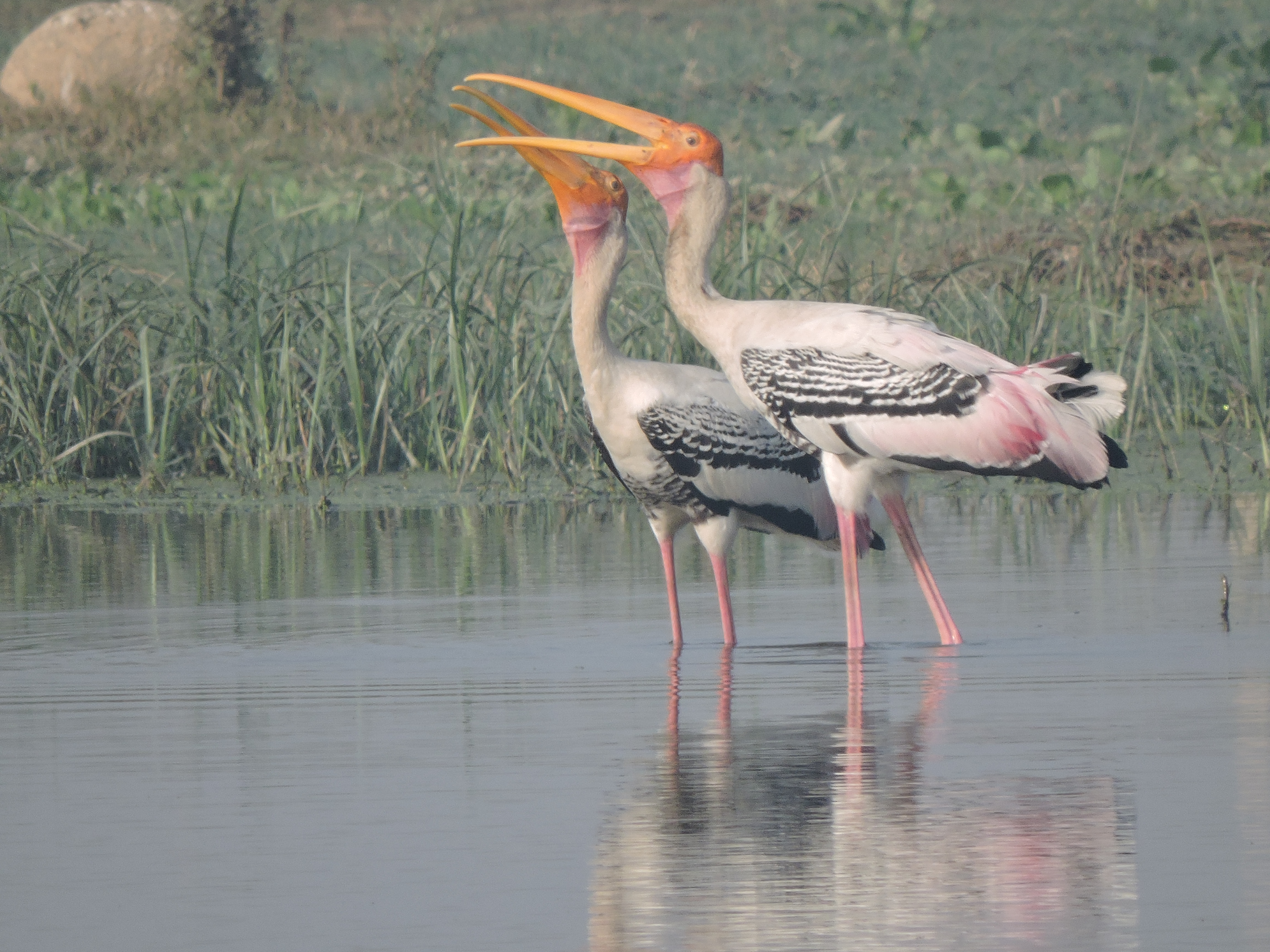

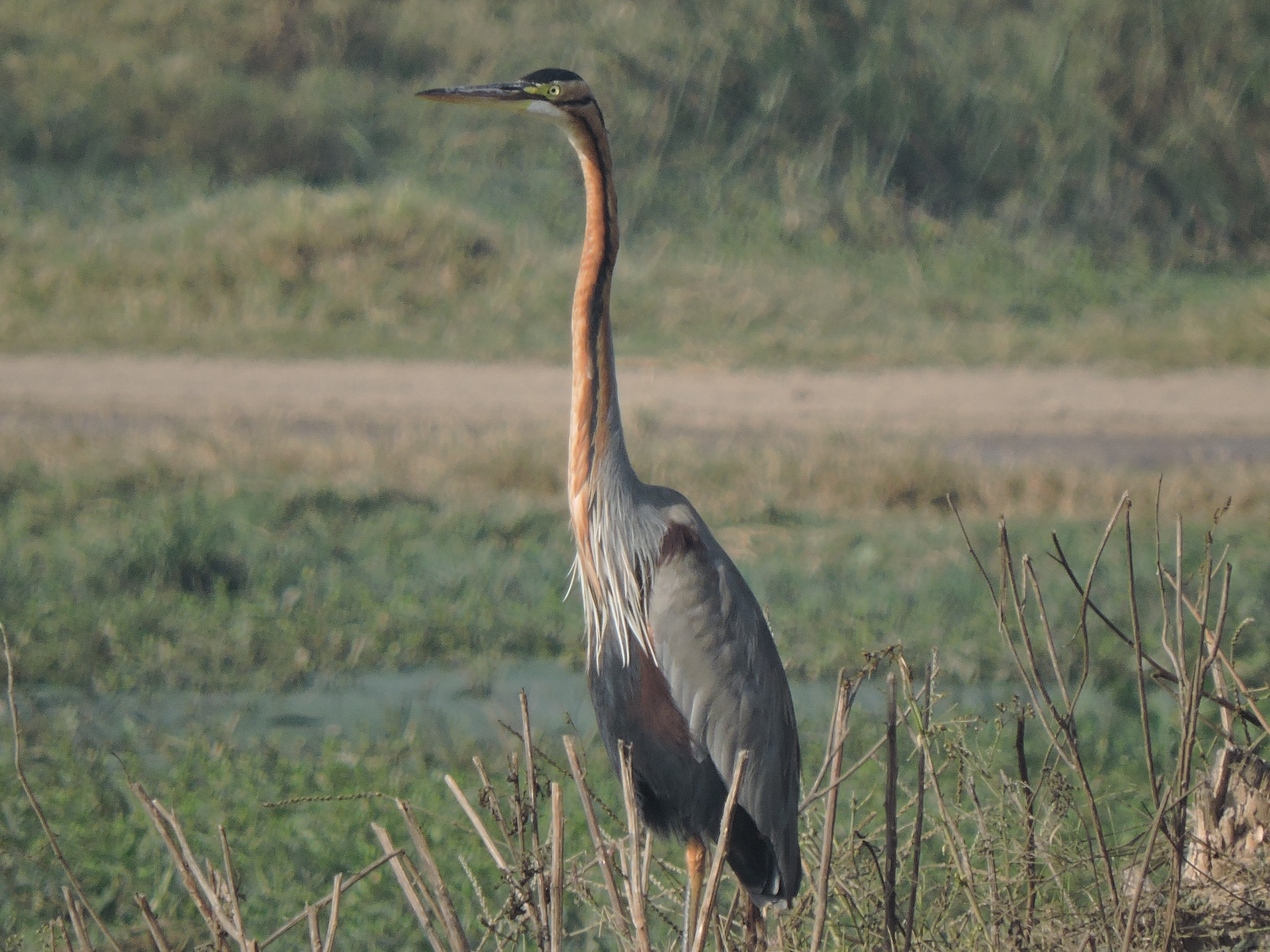

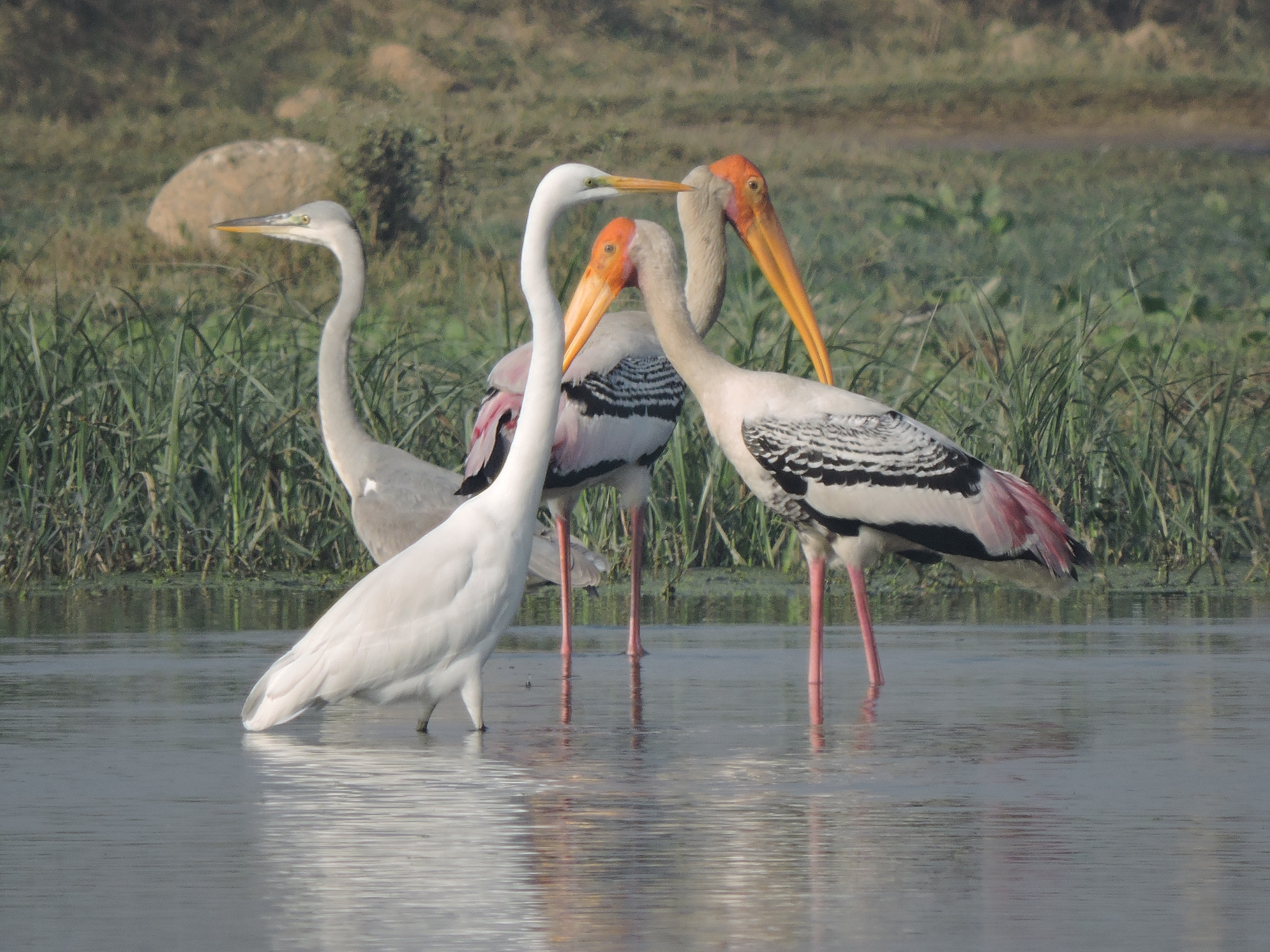

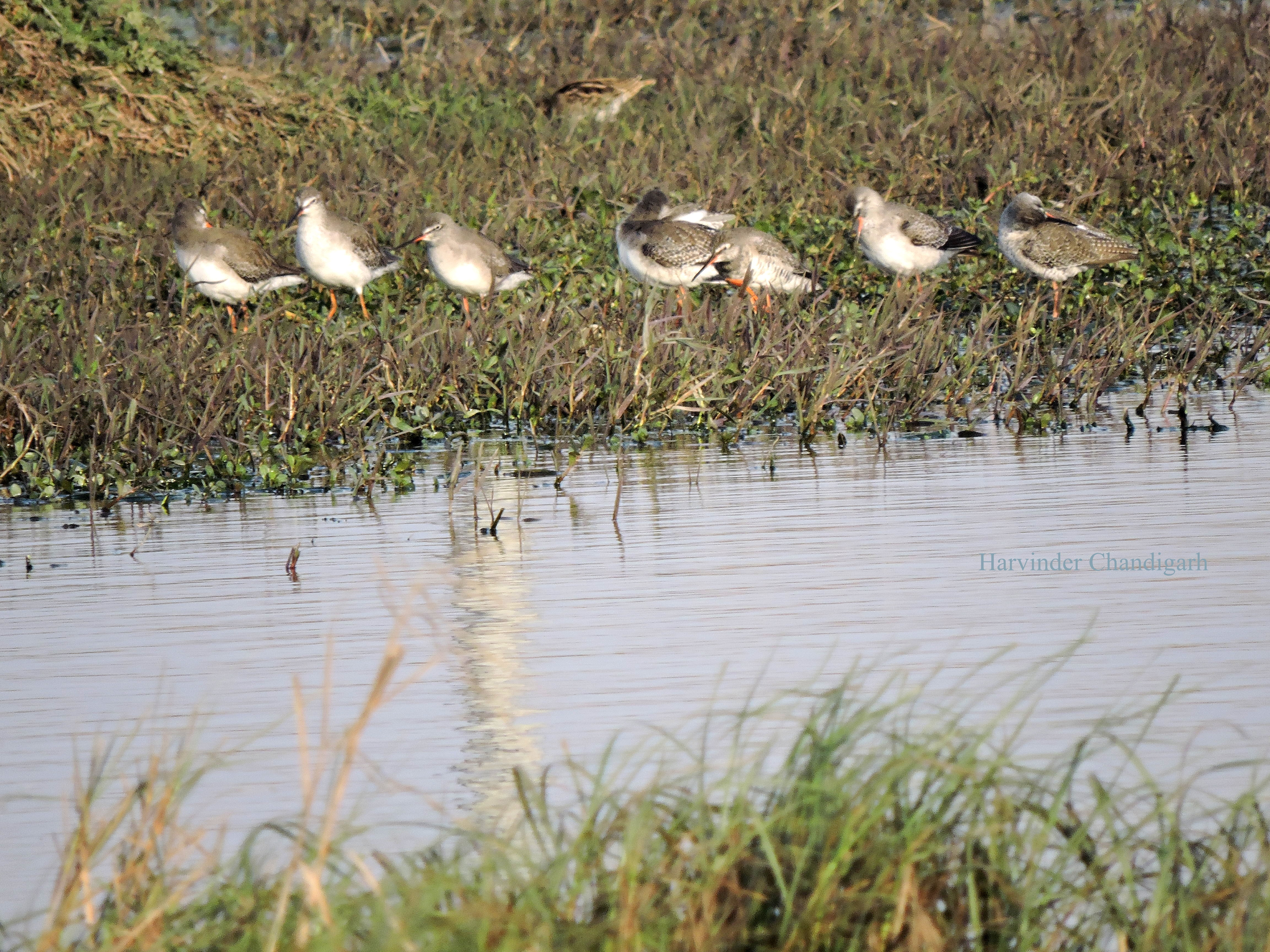

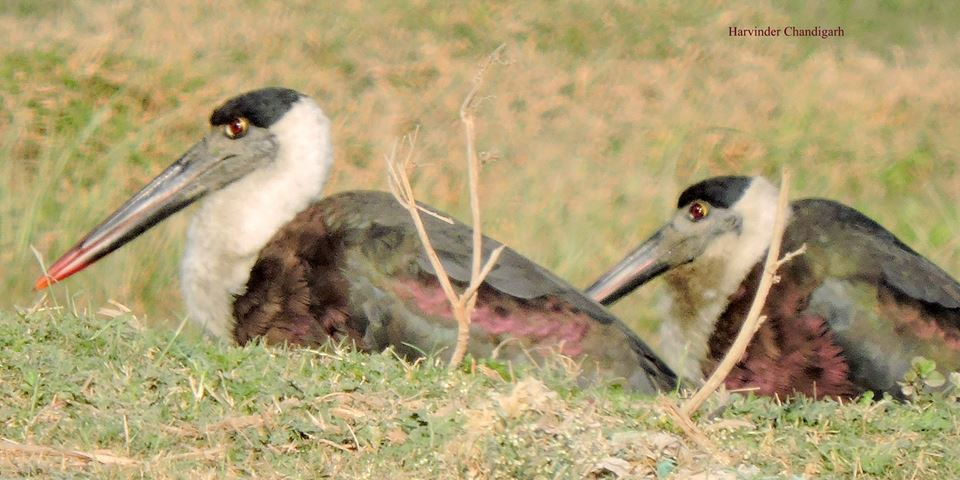

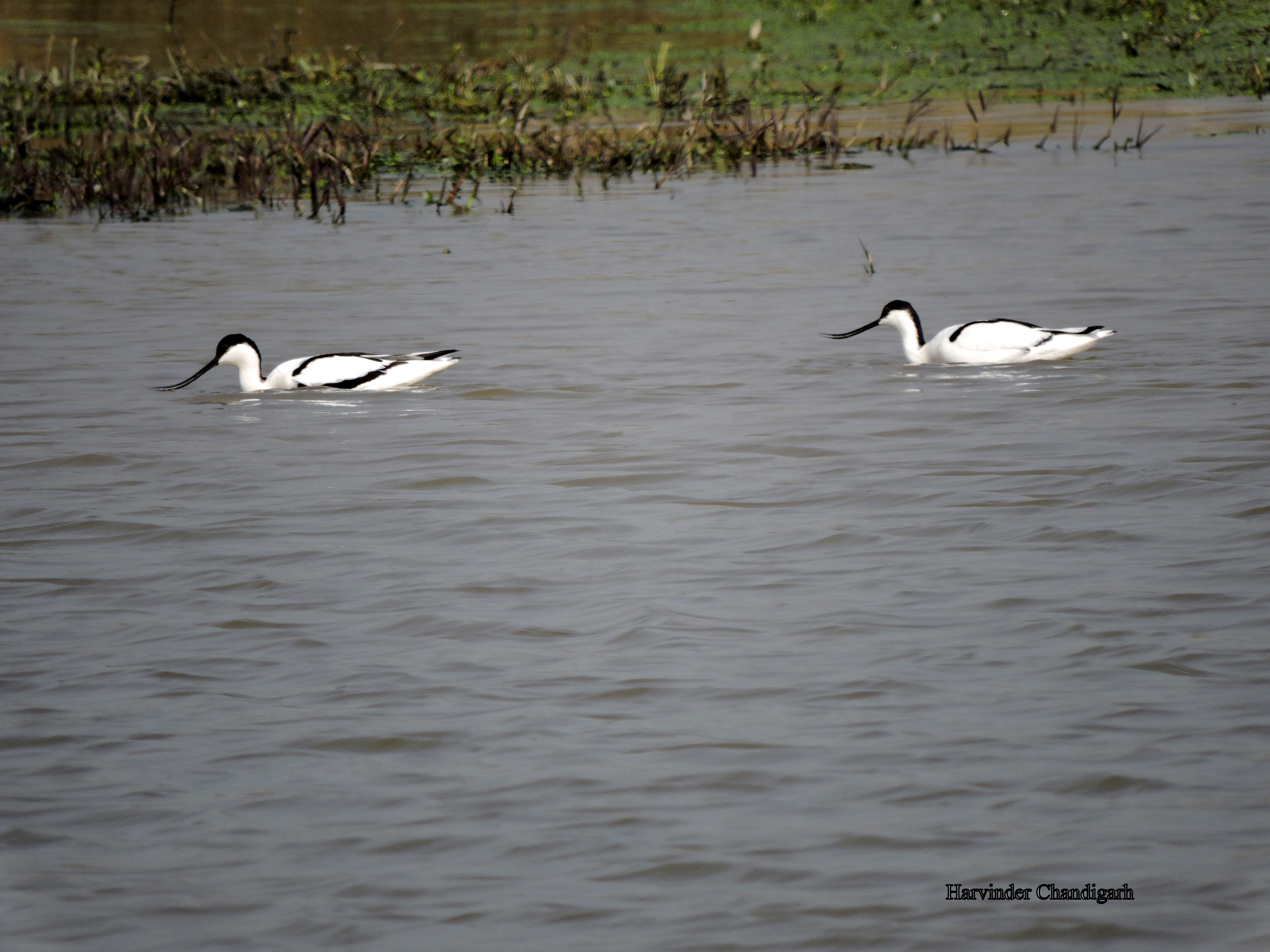

== Gurudwaras & Temples ==
- Gurudwara Dera Sahib
- Gurudwara Shaheed Bhai Sangat Singh
- Gurudwara Singh Sabha
- Gugga Mairi

== Attractions ==
The Mahendra Chaudhary Zoological Park (Chhatbir Zoo) located in Chhatt village 3 km (1.9 mi) from Bakarpur village.
