= Rampur Sanian =

Rampur Sainian
- village
- Country: India
- State: Punjab
- District: Mohali

Languages
  - Official: Punjabi
- Time zone: UTC+5:30 (IST)
- Vehicle registration: PB-
- Coastline: 0 kilometres (0 mi)
- Avg. summer temperature: 25 to 44 °C (77 to 111 °F)
- Avg. winter temperature: 0 to 20 °C (32 to 68 °F)

Rampur Sainian is a village situated in the north east of Dera Bassi in the Mohali district of Indian state of Punjab. It is on Dera Bassi-Barwala link road 6 km away from Dera Bassi. It is on the Punjab-Haryana border and is about 267 km (166 mi) from the national capital New Delhi. It is just 26 km (16 mi) away from both Chandigarh and Panchkula. In this age of industrialization, this village is also not untouched. A lot of industries can be noticed on Dera Bassi-Barwala link road to Rampur Sanian.

== Population ==
All the residents are Sainis coming under the category of Punjabi Saini. it may be possible that a Hindu and a Sikh Saini exist in the same family. The main occupation of the residents is agriculture and many are government employees. Many residents are living abroad.

== Sightseeings and monuments ==
There is a Gurudwara at the start of the village alongside of a shivaji temple. There is a primary school affiliated to PSEB. Rock Garden and Rose Garden are nearby in Chandigarh. just 20 km from here. Sukhna Lake is in the vicinity in Chandigarh.

== Historical places ==
Gurudwara Amb Sahib, Phase - 8, Mohali.

Angitha Sahib, Phase - 8, Mohali.

Gurudwara Singh Sahidaan Gurudwara Singh Sahidaan - Sohana.

Gurudwara Puddha Sahib Gurudwara Puddha Sahib - Zirakpur.

Gurudwara Nabha Sahib - Zirakpur.

== Climate ==
The nearby Shivalik mountain range has considerable effect on the climate of Rampur Sanian like as on Chandigarh. The winters are really cold when temperature reaches near the freezing point.

== How to reach ==
Nearest Airport is Chandigarh being 15 km from here. Otherwise Chandigarh Railway Station is also the nearest one. A good frequent bus service is provided by Punjab Roadways, Haryana roadways and Chandigarh Transport Undertaking.

== Sarpanch ==
BINDER KUMAR is the Sarpanch of the village.
