= Baljinder Singh =

Indian racewalker

Personal information
- Nationality: Indian
- Born: 18 September 1986 (age 40) Dera Bassi, Punjab, India

Sport
- Sport: Track and field
- Event: 20 kilometres race walk

Baljinder Singh (born 18 September 1986) is an Indian athlete who competes in the 20 kilometres race walk event. He has qualified in the 20 kilometres race walk event at the London Olympics 2012. His personal best in this event is 1:22:12.

Baljinder clocked a time of 1:25:39 in the 20 km walk event at the London Olympics and finished 43rd.

== Personal life ==
He hails from Dera Bassi a town in the Mohali district near Chandigarh, Punjab, India. He got his sports training at Sports Authority of India, Bangalore centre under the tutelage of Ramakrishnan Gandhi.

== See also ==
- Athletics at the 2012 Summer Olympics – Men's 20 kilometres walk
