= Nayagaon, Punjab =

Nayagaon Naya Gan
- Town
- Location in Punjab, India Nayagaon (India)
- Coordinates: 30°46′30″N 76°47′34″E
- Country: India
- State: Punjab
- District: S.A.S.Nagar
- Settlement: 1783 Circa
- Founder: Sikh Forces on the way to Sri Anandpur Saheb after the conquest of Delhi.

Government
  - Type: Local Urban Body
  - Body: Municipal council
  - MLA: Kanwar Sandhu(politician)
  - Member of Parliament: Manish Tewari

Population (2011)
  - Total: 50,869

Languages
  - Official: Punjabi
- Time zone: UTC+5:30 (IST)
- Postal code: 160103
- Vehicle registration: PB-65
- Vidhan Sabha constituency: S.A.S. Nagar (Mohali)
- Lok Sabha constituency: Anandpur Sahib

Naya Gaon (Nawa Gaon or Nayagaon) is a small town and a Municipal council, formerly Nagar panchayat (Notified Area Committee) in the Majri Sub-Tehsil and Kharar Tehsil of District S.A.S. Nagar of Punjab State of India. Chandigarh borders Naya Gaon on two sides. Pin code 160103

== History ==
Naya Gaon was founded in Circa, in 1783, as a small settlement by the battle fatigued Sikh soldiers on the way to Sri Anandpur Sahib while coming from Delhi after the conquest of Delhi Sultanate by the Sikhs, as a large section of the Sikh forces had decided to celebrate 'Hola Mahala' at Anandpur Sahib. The first settlers on this land were the Dhillon followed by the Sidhu, Nagra, Mavi, Jatts and then the Brahmins. Other working classes were subsequently brought in by the initial settlers to help in their work. Naya Gaon remained a part of Mani Majra Riasat till the independence of India. Then remained a part of District Ambala of joint Punjab. Large amounts of land belonging to Naya Gaon was acquired by the Govt. for the Chandigarh project. After the division of Punjab in 1965 it became a part of Ropar District. In the year 2006 a new district S.A.S. Nagar (Mohali) was formed and Naya Gaon became a part of the Mohali district. In the 1980s people from all parts of northern India started settling in Naya Gaon due to affordable housing as compared to Chandigarh. Today it has become a conglomerate of people from the states of Punjab, Haryana, Himachal Pradesh, Jammu and Kashmir, Uttrakhand, U.P., Bihar, Bengal and North Eastern States.

== Demographics ==
The table below shows the population of different religious groups in Nayagaon as of the 2011 census.

Population by religious groups in Naya Gaon city, 2011 census
Religion	Total	Female	Male
Hindu	43,997	20,175	23,822
Sikh	4,965	2,348	2,617
Muslim	1,183	545	638
Christian	603	292	311
Jain	13	6	7
Buddhist	13	4	9
Other religions	1	1	0
Not stated	94	40	54
Total	50,869	23,411	27,458

== Governance ==
Nayagaon remained a gram panchayat till the year 2006, when Notified Area Committee (NAC) Status was given, with the villages Nada, Karoran and Kansal added to it. In 2017, the status was elevated to Municipal Council. Naya Gaon remains the heart of the Municipal Council with the Council Office, Post Office, Police Station and Suvidha Kendra located there. Nayagaon consists of major residential colonies: Gobind Nagar, Dashmesh Nagar, Adarsh Nagar, Shivalik Vihar, Kumaon Nagar, Vikas Nagar, and Janta Colony. It has 21 wards, each represented by a councillor. Nagar Kheda, Village Well, Gurdwara, and Shiv Mandir are the oldest known common places of Naya Gaon.

Naya Gaon is close to major tourist attractions in Chandigarh, such as Rose Garden, PGI, Rock Garden and Lake. It is also the nearest route to access hill stations like Kasauli.
