= Sahauran =

Coordinates: 30°47′N 76°36′E

- village
- Interactive map of Sahauran
- Country: India
- State: Punjab
- District: Mohali

Languages
  - Official: Punjabi
- Time zone: UTC+5:30 (IST)
- Postal code: 140103
- Vehicle registration: PB-27 or PB-65
- Coastline: 0 kilometres (0 mi)

Sahauran is a village in Mohali district, Punjab, India, located on NH 205. The village falls under tehsil Kharar, and is about 23 km (14 mi) from Chandigarh. The neighbouring towns of village sahauran are Kurali (5 km (3.1 mi)), Kharar (5 km (3.1 mi)), Ropar (20 km (12 mi)). The nearest airport is Chandigarh International Airport which is 28 km (17 mi) away from village. The population is about 5000.

The postal pin code is 140103.

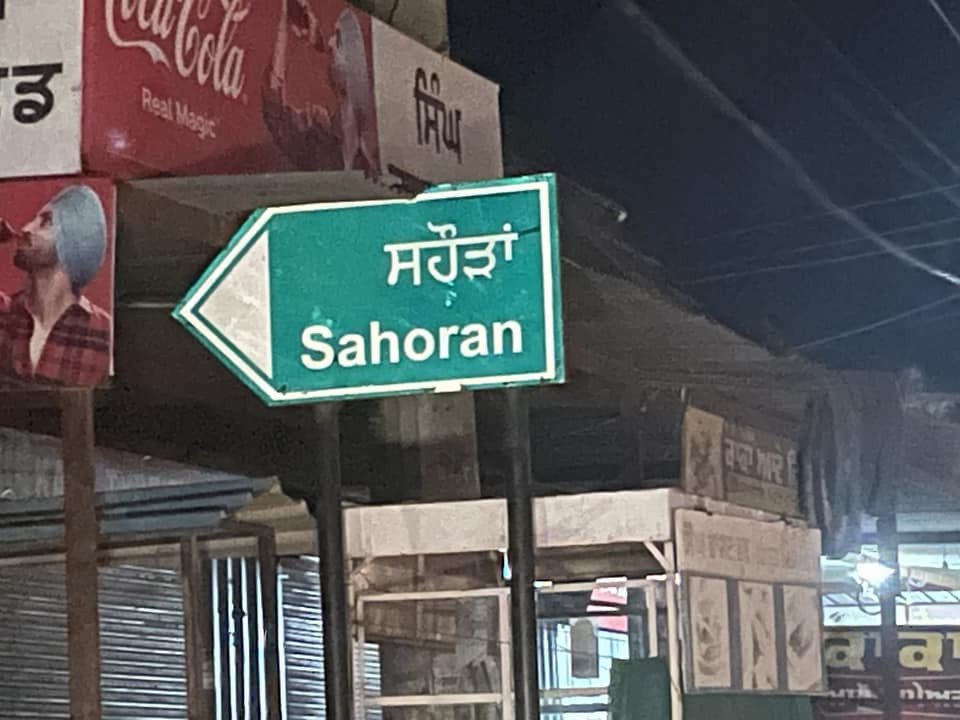
ਸਹੌੜਾਂ - Sahauran (Sahoran) - sign board at the start of the town on the highway

== Educational institutions ==
- Chandigarh University (4.2 km (2.6 mi) away from the village) near Daumajra village
- Rayat & Bahra Institute of Engineering & Bio-Technology
- Doaba Group of colleges
- Government High School, Sahauran
- Government Secondary School, Sahauran
- Navyugam institute (computer course, tuition classes, coaching)

== Historical places ==
- Gurudwara Mata Raaj Kaur sahib ji
- Baba Sedha Singh Ashram Gurudwara
- Dera Baba Malook Dass ji (Gulabdasiye)
- Dhakk vala baba, Guga Merhi
- Shaheedi asthaan Singh Shaheedan
- Prachin Hindu Shiv Mandir
- Nirmala dera Bhindranwale
- Gurudwara Singh Sabha
- Nanak Darbar sahib
- Historical well built by Lakhi Shah wanjara

== Government locations ==
- Sahauran Branch Post Office
- Punjab Gramin Bank, Sahauran
- Sahauran Dispensary

== Transportation ==
Sahauran comes in the bus route between Chandigarh and Rupnagar. one can get direct bus to chandigarh and other major cities. Cabs like Uber and Ola are also available to reach nearby cities.
