= Tewar =

Tewar may refer to:

Places

- Tewar, Madhya Pradesh, a village in India
- Tewar, Punjab, a village in India

People

- Divya Tewar, Indian judoka
