= Tewar, Punjab =

Tewar Teur
- village
- Location in Punjab, India Tewar (India)
- Coordinates: 30.7945°N 76.6556°E
- Country: India
- State: Punjab
- District: Mohali

Government
  - Body: Panchayat

Population
  - Total: 6,000

Languages
  - Official: Punjabi
- Time zone: UTC+5:30 (IST)
- Postal code: 140301
- 0160: 91-160
- Vehicle registration: PB 27
- Nearest city: Kharar, Mohali
- Lok Sabha constituency: Anandpur Sahib
- Vidhan Sabha constituency: Kharar, Mohali
- Civic agency: Panchayat
- Climate: extreme hot in summers and extreme cold in winters. (Köppen)

Tewar, (Tiaur or Teuris) is a village in the Mohali District (previously Rupnagar District) of the state of Punjab, India. According to the 2011 Census, the population of the village is about 4500. The village is situated about 7–8 kilometers east on Kharar-Kurali stretch of NH 21. The village is said to be most developed and bigger than other villages in the area. Tewar is the market hub among the neighboring villages' viz. Radiala, Jakar Majra, Bhajauli, Ghataur, Palheri, Rurkee kham, Abheypur etc. Its market comprises medical stores, apparel stores, electronic stores, electrical stores and general stores. The village has one government sr sec school and 3 private schools, and also one computer center. The village has one gramin bank, post office and a verka milk dairy. The village has rich religious places: 1 historical gurudwara sahib named GURUDWARA BHANDARA SAHIB which has religious beliefs that Guru Gobind Singh ji visited that place where gurudwara sahib is built. The village has 2 more gurudwara and 3 Hindu temples and a mosque.

== See also ==
- Rupnagar
- Kharar
- Kurali
