= Cholta Kalan =

Cholta Kalan is a village located near Kharar, Mohali, in the district of Mohali in the state of Punjab in India. It has a population of about 2500 persons living in around 201 households.
