= Bhankharpur =

- Census town
- Location in Punjab, India Bhankharpur (India)
- Coordinates: 30.6056°N 76.8365°E
- Country: India
- State: Punjab
- District: Mohali

Population (2001)
  - Total: 9,118

Languages
  - Official: Punjabi
  - Other: Puadhi
- Time zone: UTC+5:30 (IST)
- Postal code: 140201 phone no = 9217700065
- Website: bhankharpur.com

Bhankharpur is a census town in Mohali district (officially Sahibzada Ajit Singh Nagar district) in the state of Punjab, India.

== Demographics ==
As of 2001 India census, Bhankharpur had a population of 9118. Males constitute 54% of the population and females 46%. Bhankharpur has an average literacy rate of 71%, higher than the national average of 59.5%; with male literacy of 74% and female literacy of 67%. 13% of the population is under 6 years of age.

The table below shows the population of different religious groups in Bhankharpur town, as of 2011 census.

Population by religious groups in Bhankharpur town, 2011 census
Religion	Total	Female	Male
Hindu	7,299	3,356	3,943
Sikh	3,331	1,581	1,750
Muslim	91	28	63
Christian	40	22	18
Buddhist	1	0	1
Not stated	6	5	1
Total	10,768	4,992	5,776
