= Dera Bassi =

- city
- Nickname: Bassi
- Location in Punjab, India
- Coordinates: 30.5872°N 76.8428°E
- Country: India
- State: Punjab
- District: Mohali
- Elevation: 350 m (1,150 ft)

Population (2011)
  - Total: 26,985

Languages
  - Official: Punjabi
  - Regional: Puadhi
- Time zone: UTC+5:30 (IST)
- PIN: 140507
- Vehicle registration: PB70, PB65

Dera Bassi is a satellite city of Chandigarh and a municipal council in Mohali district in the state of Punjab, India. Dera Bassi is located on the Chandigarh – Delhi National Highway, 8 km from Chandigarh. It is located within 20 km from Chandigarh, Mohali and Panchkula. It is strategically located near the boundary of Haryana, Punjab and Union Territory of Chandigarh. Derabassi is most famous for its industrial belt, situated for the most part on Ramgarh and Barwala Road. The city and the nearby area host eight Engineering, B.Ed., Paramedical and Management institutes.

== History ==
The Dera Bassi town was formed from the early Kalsia State, whose headquarters were at Chhachhrauli. There was a big fort of the Mughal era located on the outskirts of Dera Bassi. The fort still exists, albeit as a ruin. It was used as guest house by Kalsia rulers. In 1922, Ravi Sher Singh visited Dera Bassi after his paramount as the monarch of Kalsia state.

Following the merger of Kalsia State into PEPSU in 1948, the town became part of the Kohistan district. In 1953, it became part of Patiala district, following the merger of the former Kohistan district of PEPSU. Later, in 2006, it became part of the newly created Mohali district.

In Makandpur village in Dera Bassi, there is a holy place called "Kethlo Tirath" (Kamlon Third). There is a Kunti Kund Sarovar (Pond), Temple of Pandavas with Lord Krishna and Lord Shiva. It is believed that the Pandavas stayed at this place when they successfully escaped from Lakshagraha.

== Geography and ecology ==
=== Location ===
Derabassi is located near the foothills of the Sivalik range of the Himalayas in northwest India. It has an average elevation of 321 metres (1053 ft).

The city, lying in the northern plains, has vast fertile and flat land. The surrounding cities are the union territory of Chandigarh, Mohali, Patiala, Zirakpur and Roopnagar in Punjab, Panchkula, and Ambala in Haryana.

Chandigarh is situated 119 km southwest of Shimla, 30 km (19 miles) northeast of Ambala, 236 km (148 miles) southeast of Amritsar and 230 km (144 miles) north of Delhi.

=== Climate ===
Derabassi

Climate chart (precipitation, max. and min. temperature)
J	F	M	A	M	J	J	A	S	O	N	D
33 16 3	39 20 5	30 25 10	9 32 16	28 35 20	145 36 22	280 31 21	308 30 20	133 30 19	22 29 14	9 24 8	22 19 4
- █ Average max. and min. temperatures in °C
- █ Precipitation totals in mm
- Source: World Weather Information Service
Imperial conversion
J	F	M	A	M	J	J	A	S	O	N	D
1.3 62 38	1.5 68 42	1.2 78 51	0.4 89 61	1.1 96 68	5.7 96 72	11 88 70	12 85 69	5.2 86 66	0.9 84 57	0.4 76 46	0.9 66 39
- █ Average max. and min. temperatures in °F
- █ Precipitation totals in inches

Derabassi has a humid subtropical climate (Köppen: Cwa) characterised by a seasonal rhythm: very hot summers, mild winters, unreliable rainfall and great variation in temperature (−1 °C to 46 °C OR 30.2 °F to 114 °F). The average annual rainfall is 1110.7 mm. The city also receives occasional winter rains from the Western Disturbance originating over the Mediterranean Sea.

The western disturbances usually brings rain predominantly from mid-December till end of April which can be heavier sometimes with strong winds and hails if the weather turns colder (during March–April months) which usually proves disastrous to the crops. Cold winds usually tend to come from the north near Shimla, capital of Himachal Pradesh and from the union territory Jammu and Kashmir, both of which receive their share of snowfall during wintertime.

The city experiences the following seasons and the respective average temperatures:

- Spring: The climate remains the most enjoyable part of the year during the spring season (from February-end to early-April). Temperatures vary between (max) 13 °C to 20 °C and (min) 5 °C to 12 °C.
- Autumn: In autumn (from September-end to mid-November.), the temperature may rise to a maximum of 30 °C. Temperatures usually remain between 10° and 22° in autumn. The minimum temperature is around 6 °C.
- Summer: The temperature in summer (from mid-April to June-end) may rise to 44 °C. The temperatures might sometime rise to 44 °C in mid-June. Temperatures generally vary between 40 and 42 °C.
- Monsoon: During monsoon (from early-July to mid-September), Derabassi receives moderate to heavy rainfall and sometimes heavy to very heavy rainfall (generally during the month of August or September). Usually, the rain bearing monsoon winds blow from south-west/south-east. Mostly, the city receives heavy rain from south (which is mainly a persistent rain) but it generally receives most of its rain during monsoon either from North-west or North-east. Maximum amount of rain received by the city of Chandigarh during monsoon season is 195.5 mm in a single day.
- Winter: Winters (November-end to February-end) are mild but it can sometimes get quite chilly in Derabassi. Average temperatures in the winter remain at (max) 5 °C to 14 °C and (min) -1 °C to 5 °C. Rain usually comes from the west during winters and it is usually a persistent rain for 2–3 days with sometimes hailstorms. The city witnessed bone-numbing chill as the maximum temperature on Monday, 7 January 2013 plunged to a 30-year low to settle at 6.1 degrees Celsius.

Climate data for Derabassi
Month	Jan	Feb	Mar	Apr	May	Jun	Jul	Aug	Sep	Oct	Nov	Dec	Year
Record high °C (°F)	27.7 (81.9)	32.8 (91.0)	37.8 (100.0)	42.7 (108.9)	44.6 (112.3)	45.3 (113.5)	42.0 (107.6)	39.0 (102.2)	37.5 (99.5)	37.0 (98.6)	34.0 (93.2)	28.5 (83.3)	45.6 (114.1)
Mean daily maximum °C (°F)	20.4 (68.7)	23.1 (73.6)	28.4 (83.1)	34.5 (94.1)	38.3 (100.9)	38.6 (101.5)	34.0 (93.2)	32.7 (90.9)	33.1 (91.6)	31.8 (89.2)	27.3 (81.1)	22.1 (71.8)	30.4 (86.7)
Daily mean °C (°F)	13.3 (55.9)	15.7 (60.3)	20.9 (69.6)	26.7 (80.1)	30.7 (87.3)	31.5 (88.7)	29.0 (84.2)	28.0 (82.4)	27.5 (81.5)	24.4 (75.9)	18.9 (66.0)	14.4 (57.9)	23.4 (74.1)
Mean daily minimum °C (°F)	6.1 (43.0)	8.3 (46.9)	13.4 (56.1)	18.9 (66.0)	23.1 (73.6)	25.4 (77.7)	23.9 (75.0)	23.3 (73.9)	21.8 (71.2)	17.0 (62.6)	10.5 (50.9)	6.7 (44.1)	16.5 (61.7)
Record low °C (°F)	0.0 (32.0)	0.0 (32.0)	4.2 (39.6)	7.8 (46.0)	13.4 (56.1)	14.8 (58.6)	14.2 (57.6)	17.2 (63.0)	14.3 (57.7)	9.4 (48.9)	3.7 (38.7)	0.0 (32.0)	0.0 (32.0)
Average rainfall mm (inches)	33.1 (1.30)	38.9 (1.53)	30.4 (1.20)	8.5 (0.33)	28.4 (1.12)	145.2 (5.72)	280.4 (11.04)	307.5 (12.11)	133.0 (5.24)	21.9 (0.86)	9.4 (0.37)	21.9 (0.86)	1,059.3 (41.70)
Average rainy days	2.6	2.8	2.6	1.1	2.1	6.3	12.3	11.4	5.0	1.4	0.8	1.4	49.8
Source: India Meteorological Department (record high and low up to 2010)

Dera Bassi has been ranked 37th best “National Clean Air City” under (Category 3 population under 3 lakhs cities) in India according to 'Swachh Vayu Survekshan 2024 Results'.

== Demographics ==
As of the 2001 India census, Dera Bassi had a population of 15,690. Males constitute 54% of the population and females 46%. Dera Bassi has an average literacy rate of 76%, higher than the national average of 59.5%: male literacy is 80% and, female literacy is 72%. In Dera Bassi, 13% of the population is under 6 years of age. Dera Bassi's population as of 2016 is 135,685.

== Transport ==
=== Road ===
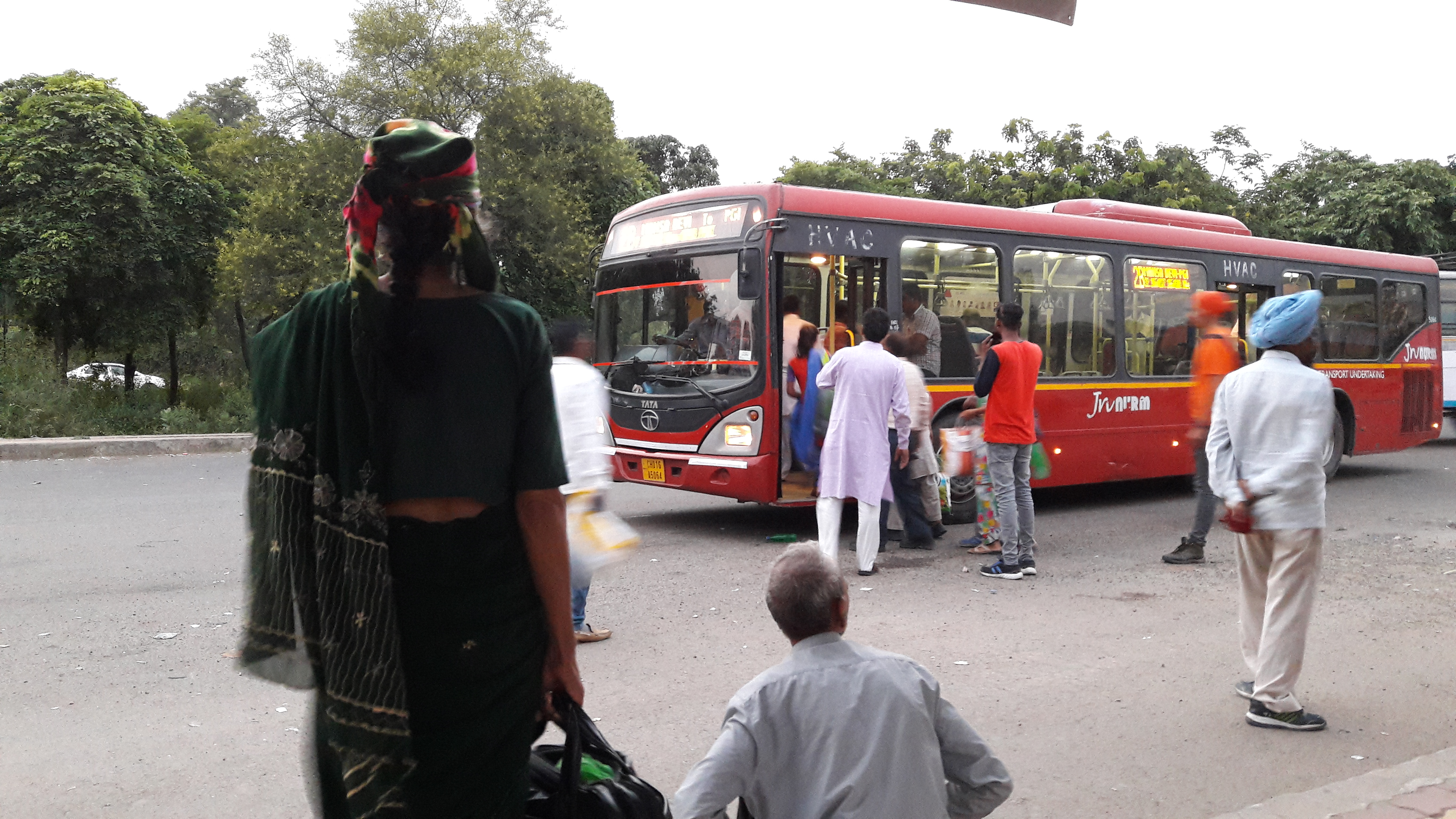
CTU AC bus plying till Derabassi

(CTU) operates public transport buses from Derabassi bus stand for ISBT 17, PGI, ISBT 43, Mansa Devi and Manimajra route. Local private buses also run for Lehli, Lalru, Barwala (Haryana) and others for Patiala, Jalandhar, Ambala etc. Haryana Roadways is also very frequent because of its location on Delhi-Chandigarh main highway. New bridges across river Ghaghar that are being demanded by residents would connect Derabassi better to Chandigarh Tricity esp Zirakpur and Mohali.

=== Air ===
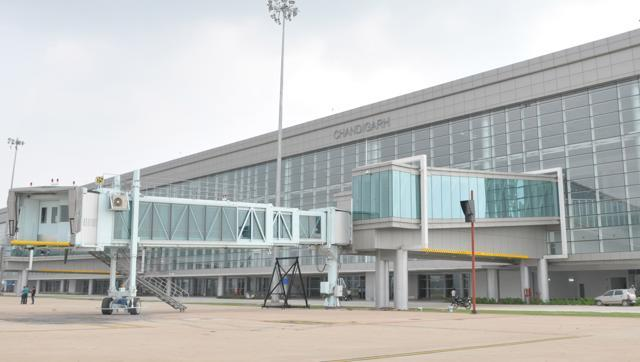
View of Chandigarh Airport new terminal

Chandigarh International Airport is the nearest airport situated in Mohali 17 km away from the city.

=== Rail ===
Chandigarh Junction railway station lies 15 km away from Derabassi via Daria and 27.5 km via ISBT 17. Ambala Cantt railway junction is 31 km away from Derabassi and lies on same Chandigarh-Delhi highway on which Derbassi is situated. Ghaggar railway station is a 132 years old small railway station situated just 4.5 km away from Derabassi mainly operational for MEMU & Passenger trains.

== Educational Institutions ==
- Sri Sukhmani Group of Institutes
- Longowal Polytechnic College
- National Dental College & Hospital
- Vidya Jyoti Institute of Higher Education at Gholu Majra village.
- L. M. Thapar School of Business Management
- Govt College Derabassi
- Sarvhitkari Vidya Mandir, Gulabgarh Road Dera Bassi
- AAR Jain School
- Lord Mahavir Jain Public School
- Blueberry Fields Public School, Saraswati Vihar, Dera Bassi
- R. K. Public School, College Road, Dera Bassi
- https://thedigitalgeek.in/, DeraBassi

== Hospitals in Dera Bassi ==
1. Blessings Multispecialty Hospital, Akali Market
2. Indus International Hospital
3. Sri Sukhmani Multi Specialty Hospital
4. Civil Hospital Dera Bassi
5. Apex Dental Care And Implant Centre
6. Apna Hospital
7. Ashoka Healthcare
8. National Dental College and Hospital, Gulabgarh
9. R. H. V. Homeopathic Polyclinic, Barwala Road Rahi

== See also ==
- Amlala
- Chandigarh capital region
- Mohali
- Panchkula
- Ambala Chandigarh Expressway
- Greater Mohali
- Ranbir Rano, television serial set in Dera Bassi
