= Amlala =

- Village
- Country: India
- State: Punjab
- District: Mohali

Area
  - Total: 466 km^{2} (180 sq mi)

Population (2008)
  - Total: 3,452

Amlala is a village located in the Mohali District in the state of Punjab, India. It is the only village in the area to have a post office.

== Location ==
To the west flows the River Ghhgar; to the south is Chandiala, and to the north is Baruali. To the east is a military area, which provides employment for many of the villagers.

== Religious structure ==
Although the population of the village is mostly Sikhs, the head of the village is currently (As of January 2025 Harninder singh paul. There are two temples in the village along with a mosque and two gurudwaras.

== Economy ==
The main occupation of the villagers is agriculture, which is quite profitable, due to the nearby river.

== Population ==
Amlala has a population of 2,943 individuals, comprising 1,593 males and 1,350 females, according to the Population Census of 2011.
