= Rayat-Bahra University =

Private university in Punjab, India

- Type: Private university
- Established: 2014; 12 years ago
- Chancellor: Gurvinder Singh Bahra
- Vice-Chancellor: Dr. Sanjay Kumar
- Location: Sahauran, Punjab, India; 30.7808°N 76.6187°E
- Campus: Urban
- Colors: Blue and red
- Website: www.rbuchd.ind.in

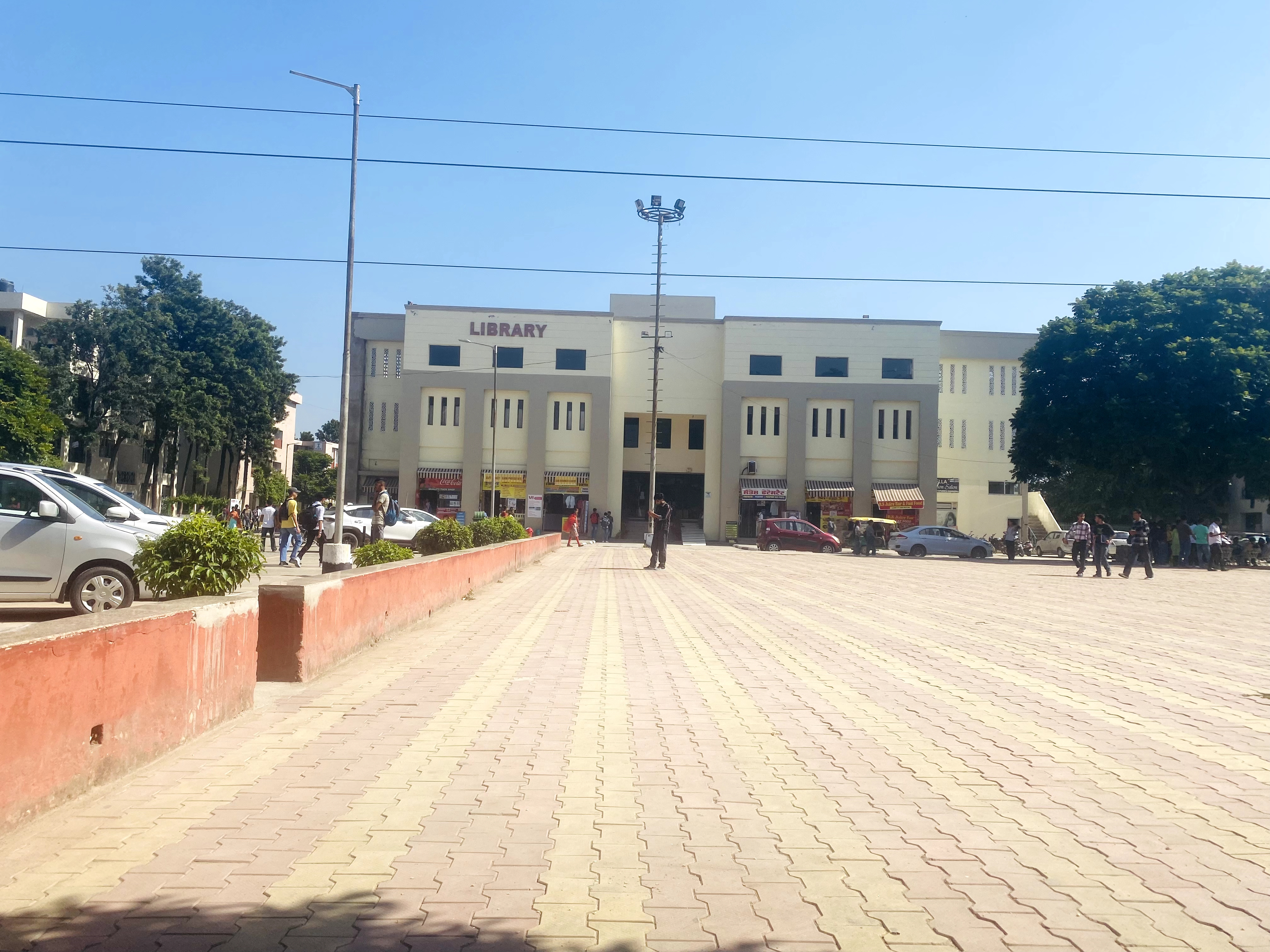
Rayat Bahra University Campus

Rayat-Bahra University (RBU) is an Indian private university located in Mohali, Punjab. The university was established in 2014 under The Rayat-Bahra University Act, 2014 by Rayat Bahra Group.

The incumbent Group vice chancellor of RBU is Prof. (Dr.) Sanjay Kumar
