= Kurali =

- Town
- Location in Punjab, India
- Coordinates: 30.83°N 76.57°E
- Country: India
- State: Punjab
- District: Mohali
- Founder: Kunwar singh Rathore
- Named for: Kunwarali
- Elevation: 282 m (925 ft)

Population
  - Total: 48,087
- Demonym: Kurali wale

Languages
  - Official: Punjabi
  - Native: Puadhi
- Time zone: UTC+5:30 (IST)
- PIN: 140103
- Telephone code: +91160
- Vehicle registration: PB 27
- Website: www.mckurali.org

Kurali is a town of district S.A.S. Nagar (Mohali) and a municipal council in Greater Mohali area, Mohali district in the Indian state of Punjab.

== Geography ==
Kurali is 28 km away from the Punjab state capital Chandigarh, situated on National Highway 21. Nearby towns include Kharar, Ropar and Morinda on its respective three sides.

== Demographics ==
The table below shows the population of different religious groups in Kurali city, as of 2011 census.

Population by religious groups in Kurali city, 2011 census
| Religion | Total | Female | Male |
|---|---|---|---|
| Hindu | 17,455 | 8,141 | 9,314 |
| Sikh | 12,241 | 5,770 | 6,471 |
| Muslim | 829 | 383 | 446 |
| Christian | 265 | 131 | 134 |
| Jain | 12 | 5 | 7 |
| Buddhist | 6 | 3 | 3 |
| Other religions | 13 | 6 | 7 |
| Not stated | 239 | 111 | 128 |
| Total | 31,060 | 14,550 | 16,510 |

== Government ==
Kurali is administered by an elected municipal council. The town is served by a government hospital, post office, and several schools and colleges.

== Transportation ==
Kurali sits on National Highway 21 with direct access to Chandigarh and other parts of Punjab and India. The city is accessible by bus and supports a rail station with direct routes to other parts of the country, including Delhi. The nearest airport is an international airport approximately 30 km away located in Mohali.

The town's railway station is one of the oldest in the state of Punjab and has been used as a set piece for several Bollywood movies.
