= Greater Mohali =

- Urban Area
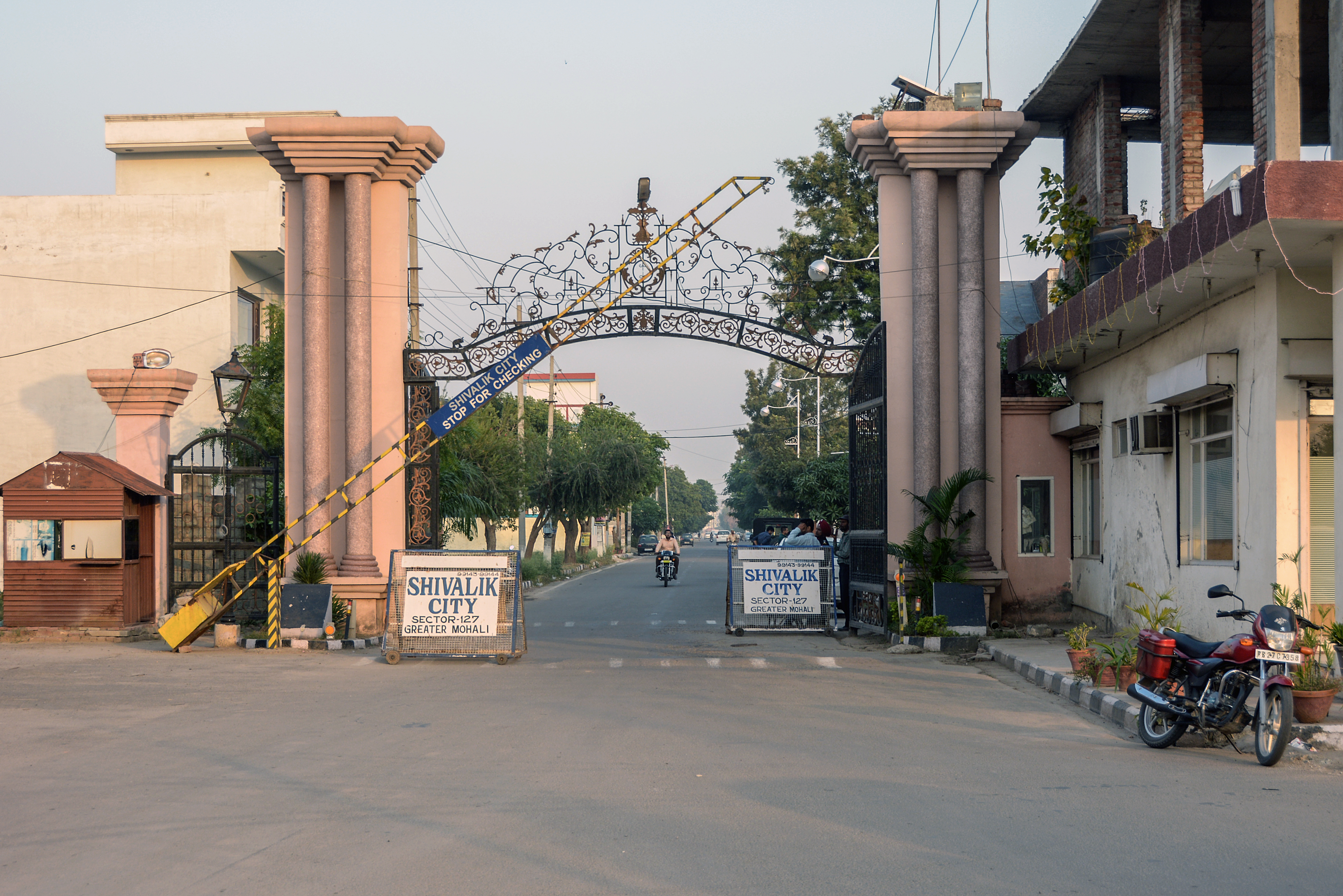
- Shivalik City enclave of Greater Mohali
- Country: India
- State: Punjab
- District: Sahibzada Ajit Singh Nagar district

Languages
  - Official: Punjabi
  - Regional: Puadhi
- Time zone: UTC+5:30 (IST)
- Telephone code: 91-172
- Vehicle registration: PB-65, PB-27

Greater Mohali is an extension of Mohali city and includes the areas of Kharar, Lalru and Landran. This area comes under Greater Mohali Area Development Authority (GMADA).

== See also ==
- Zirakpur
- Mundi Kharar
- Lalru
- New Chandigarh
- Greater Chandigarh
