= Kharar, SAS Nagar =

Kharar
- Town
- Location in Punjab, India Kharar (India)
- Coordinates: 30.74°N 76.65°E
- Country: India
- State: Punjab
- District: Sahibzada Ajit Singh Nagar district
- Named for: Education Hub of Punjab

Government
  - Type: Municipal Council
  - Body: M.C. Kharar
- Elevation: 309 m (1,014 ft)

Language
  - Official: Punjabi
  - Native: Puadhi, Hindi
- Time zone: UTC+5:30 (IST)
- Pincode(s): 140301
- Area code: 0160
- Vehicle registration: PB-27
- Literacy: 72%

Kharar is a town and a municipal council in Mohali district in the state of Punjab, India. It is nearby Mohali city. Kharar is located at 30.74°N 76.65°E and has an average elevation of 309 metres (1,014 feet). The area of Kharar is part of the "Greater Mohali" region.

A 1904 Punjab States Gazetteer lists Kharar among the Taoni Rajputs' chhats (principal villages).

== Demographics ==
Close to 60% of the people in Kharar are Sikhs making it the second Sikh majority town in the Greater Mohali region after Mohali.

Kharar is a block situated in the Sahibzada Ajit Singh Nagar district in Punjab. Positioned in the urban region of Punjab, it is among the 4 blocks of Sahibzada Ajit Singh Nagar district. As per the government records, the block code of Kharar is 129. This block has 150 villages, and there are a total of 44,620 families.

The table below shows the population of different religious groups in Kharar city, as of 2011 census.

Population by religious groups in Kharar city, 2011 census
Religion	Total	Female	Male
Sikh	43,089	20,562	22,527
Hindu	29,092	13,603	15,489
Muslim	1,136	516	620
Christian	851	428	423
Jain	97	46	51
Buddhist	3	1	2
Other religions	3	1	2
Not stated	189	85	104
Total	74,460	35,242	39,218

== Education ==
There are many educational institutions established from British Raj till post independence in Kharar.

- Christian Boys High School, Kharar was established in 1891 and was headed by principal RW Ryburn.
- Khalsa Senior Secondary School, Kharar was established in 1920
- Arya Senior Secondary School and Women College, Kharar was established in 1968 by Arya pratinidhi sabha, Jalandhar.
- Henderson Jubilee Senior Secondary School, Kharar was established in 1975.
- IPS Senior Secondary School, Badala Road Kharar
- Vikram Public High School, Ram Bagh Road, Kharar

Kharar also has many universities, engineering colleges and a dental college in its vicinity, such as:

- Rayat Bahra University, Sahauran
- Chandigarh University, Gharuan
- Chandigarh Group of Colleges, Landran and Jhanjheri
- Doaba Group of Colleges, Sahauran
- Shaheed Udham Singh College of Engineering & Technology, Tangori (Mohali)
- Government Polytechnic College, Khunimajra

== Medical testing ==
Kharar has Punjab's only State Chemical Testing Laboratory which can perform viscera examination and a Forensic Laboratory, helpful for speedy justice in legal cases. Kharar has its own government hospital as well. It is situated in the north end of the city.

== Commerce ==
Virtuous Retail Punjab Mall (VR Punjab Mall) (formerly known as North Country Mall) in Kharar is one of the largest shopping malls with an area of 2 million sq ft.

== See also ==
- Greater Mohali
- New Chandigarh
