= Mohali district =

Mohali district Sahibzada Ajit Singh Nagar district
- District of Punjab
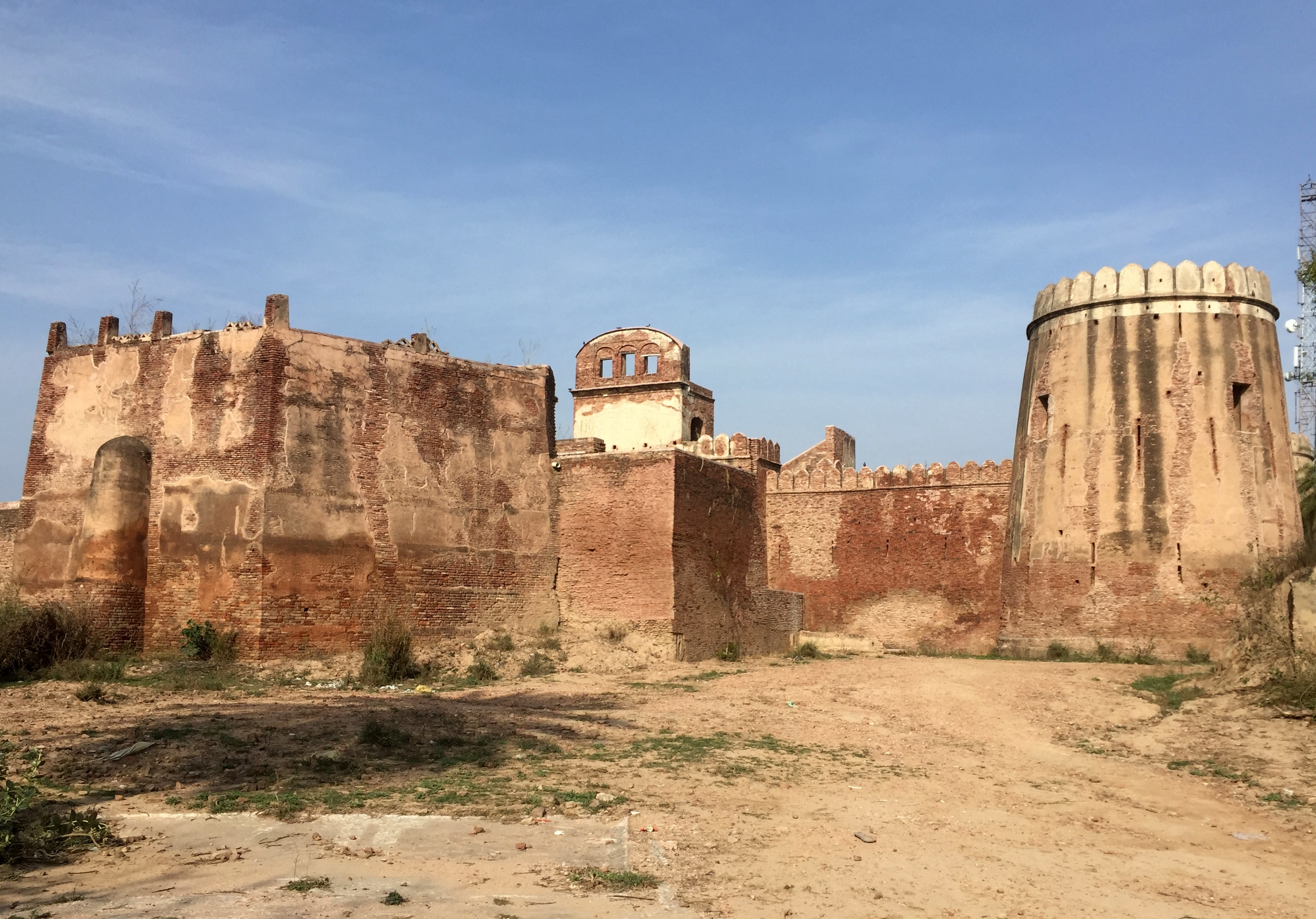
- Manauli Fort

- Location in Punjab
- Coordinates: 30.69°N 76.72°E
- Country: India
- State: Punjab
- Established: 14 April 2006
- Headquarters: Mohali

Government
  - MLA (Urban): Kulwant Singh
  - Member of Parliament: Malvinder Singh Kang

Area
  - Total: 1,098 km^{2} (424 sq mi)

Population (2011)
  - Total: 994,628
  - Density: 905.9/km^{2} (2,346/sq mi)

Languages
  - Official: Punjabi
  - Regional: Puadhi
- Time zone: UTC+5:30 (IST)
- ISO 3166 code: IN-PB-SA
- Vehicle registration: PB 65
- Vidhan Sabha constituency: S.A.S. Nagar (Mohali)
- Lok Sabha constituency: Anandpur Sahib
- Website: sasnagar.nic.in

Mohali district, officially known as Sahibzada Ajit Singh Nagar district or SAS Nagar district, is one of the twenty-three districts of Punjab, a state in north-west India. It was formed in April 2006 and is 18th district of Punjab, created next to Pathankot district. This district was carved out of areas falling in Ropar and Patiala District. It is situated next to the union territory of Chandigarh, Ambala and Panchkula districts of Haryana. The district is part of the Ropar division.

The district is officially named after Sahibzada Ajit Singh, the eldest son of Guru Gobind Singh.

== Administration ==
The district of SAS Nagar has three tehsils, all of which have sub-divisional status. These are Dera Bassi, Kharar and SAS Nagar-Mohali. There are four community development blocks (CDBs or 'blocks') that make up the district: Dera Bassi CDB, Kharar CDB, Majri CDB, and Rajpura CDB. Only part of Rajpura CDB is under the administrative control of SAS Nagar district; a portion of its area is contained within the Patiala district. SAS Nagar has fifteen towns; seven are statutory towns, and eight are census towns.

=== Subdistricts of Mohali district ===
According to the Indian government's integrated online directory, Mohali district is divided into the following subdistricts (tehsils/subdivisions) and blocks:

- Subdistricts
  1. Dera Bassi
  2. Kharar
  3. Sas Nagar (Mohali)
- Blocks:
  1. Dera Bassi
  2. Kharar
  3. Majri
  4. Mohali

=== Community development blocks ===
==== Dera Bassi ====
This block consists of 144 villages and two towns namely Zirakpur and Dera Bassi and there are six uninhabited villages. As per the 2001 census, the total population of the block is 216,921. The rural population of the block is 170192 out of which there are 93,116 males and 77,076 females. The total SC population in the rural area is 48,683. This block has total area of 406.48 km^{2} (156.94 sq mi), with the rural area covering 371.17 km^{2} (143.31 sq mi). Dera Bassi block has a good number of small scale units. Chemical paints, Steel tubes, plywood, handlooms, and knitting of Daris are some of the industries which have offered good employment to several persons. The soil of the block is sandy to sandy loam. There are a total of 25 branches are functioning in the block which comprises 19 commercial banks, one private bank, three cooperative banks, one Malwa Gramin Bank and one agricultural development bank. Zirakpur and had a very fast development and has become a part of Greater Chandigarh.

==== Kharar ====
This block consists of 154 villages and two towns namely Ajitgarh and Kharar and there are four uninhabited villages. As per the 2001 census, the total population of the block is 369,798. The rural population of the block is 196,044 out of which there are 106,688 males and 89,356 females. The total Scheduled Caste (SC) population in the rural area is 55,544. The block has a total area of 411.32 km^{2} (158.81 sq mi), of which the rural area is 383.26 km^{2} (147.98 sq mi).

Under the service area approach, all the villages have been allocated among 17 branches of commercial banks and four branches of RPBs. There are a total of 86 branches are functioning in the block which comprises 57 commercial banks, 13 private banks, 11 cooperative banks, four Punjab Gramin Banks, and one Agricultural Development bank. SAS Nagar has emerged as an Industrial Focal Point and designated as District Headquarters. It has become a satellite town of Chandigarh and has registered a fast rate of growth.

==== Majri ====
Majri Block comprises 116 villages one of which is uninhabited. This block forms part of the Kharar subdivision. The total population of the block is 111,598 as per the 2001 census. The population in the rural area is 88551, out of which 47,892 are males and 40,659 are female. The SC population in the rural area is 25,531. Kurali is the only town in the block and has a population of 23,047. This block is spread over an area 274.84 km^{2} (106.12 sq mi). The block comes under the dark category. All the villages numbering 116 have been allocated among eight branches of commercial banks and one branch of P.G.B. 16 branches are operating in this block which comprises 9 branches of commercial banks. One private Sector Bank, One branch of PGB and SAS Nagar central co-operative bank have five branches. Due to certain incentives being initiated by the Government many large and small-scale industrial units have been established around Kurali.

== Architecture ==
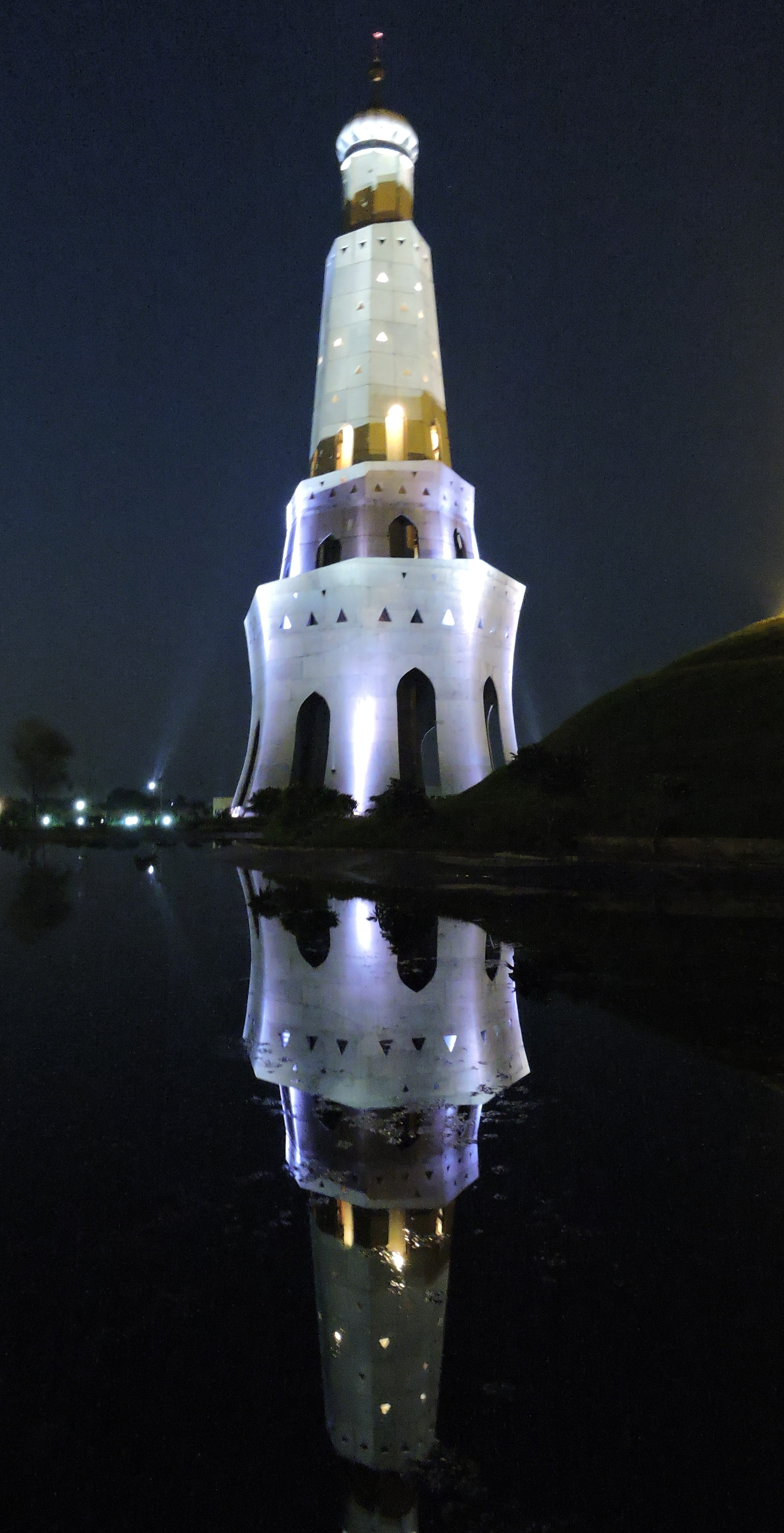
Banda Singh Bahadur War Memorial is the tallest victory tower in India and is located at Chappar Chiri in the district

=== Fateh Burj ===
The Fateh Burj (English: The Victory Tower; Punjabi: ਫਤਿਹ ਬੁਰਜ) is the tallest victory tower (Minar) in the country. The 328 ft (100 m) tower is dedicated to the establishment of Sikh rule in India in 1711. It is also known as Baba Banda Singh Bahadur War Memorial. It was here that Banda Singh Bahadur, one of the most respected Sikh warriors, won a decisive battle against Wazir Khan, commander of the Mughal army.

=== Karam Singh Baidwan Estate (KSBE) ===
The Karam Singh Baidwan Estate (KSBE) is a historic ancestral property located in Mattaur (Sector 70, Mohali), owned by Karam Singh Baidwan. It carries a 200-year legacy tied to the Baidwan lineage, whose ancestors were local rulers. A château-style residence occupies the site. Folklore says, "Ten thousand and one men, with five thousand and nine oxen, wrought this hall together."

KSBE, Mohali

== Demographics ==
According to the 2011 census, SAS Nagar district has a population of 994,628, roughly equal to the nation of Fiji or the US state of Montana. This gives it a ranking of 450th in India (out of a total of 640). The district has a population density of 830 inhabitants per square kilometre (2,100/sq mi) . Its population growth rate over the decade 2001-2011 was 32.02%. SAS Nagar has a sex ratio of 878 females for every 1,000 males, and a literacy rate of 84.9%. Scheduled Castes made up 21.74% of the population.

=== Religions ===
Religion in Shahibzada Ajit Singh Nagar district (2011)
Religion	Percent
Sikhism	48.15%
Hinduism	47.88%
Islam	2.96%
Christianity	0.54%
Other or not stated	0.46%

Religion in tehsils of Mohali district (2011)
Tehsil	Sikhism (%)	Hinduism (%)	Islam (%)	Christianity (%)	Others (%)
Kharar	57.31	39.05	2.74	0.60	0.30
Mohali	53.71	42.71	2.57	0.54	0.47
Dera Bassi	33.99	61.38	3.56	0.47	0.60

The table below shows the population of different religions in absolute numbers in the urban and rural areas of SAS Nagar district.

Absolute numbers of different religious groups in SAS Nagar district
Religion	Urban (2011)	Rural (2011)
Hindu	3,23,389	1,52,887
Sikh	2,01,295	2,77,613
Muslim	12,494	16,994
Christian	4,470	872
Other religions	2,963	1,651

=== Languages ===
Languages of Shahibzada Ajit Singh Nagar district (2011)
1. Punjabi (74.7%)
2. Hindi (22.4%)
3. Others (2.86%)

At the time of the 2011 census, 74.72% of the population spoke Punjabi and 22.42% Hindi as their first language.

== Health ==
The table below shows the number of road accidents and people affected in SAS Nagar district by year.

Road accidents and people affected in SAS Nagar district by year
Year	Accidents	Killed	Injured	Vehicles Involved
2022	485	287	376	751
2021	444	260	314	517
2020	438	247	307	583
2019	529	282	368	560

== Weather ==
Mohali has a subtropical climate where the summers are hot, the winters cold, because it is close to the mountains in Himachal, and the monsoons are mild to average.

In summers (May–September) the temperature can rise up to 47 °C (117 °F) and in winters (November–February) the temperature can go as low as 1 or 0 °C (34 or 32 °F). In the monsoon months, the weather is hot and humid and the spring season is pleasant with a mild chill.

== Politics ==
No.	Constituency	Name of MLA	Party	Bench
112	Dera Bassi	Kuljit Singh Randhawa	Aam Aadmi Party	Government
52	Kharar	Anmol Gagan Maan	Aam Aadmi Party	Government
53	S.A.S. Nagar	Kulwant Singh	Aam Aadmi Party	Government

== District areas ==
Villages and towns within the district include:

- Bakarpur
- Banur
- Bhankharpur
- Chappar Chiri
- Cholta Kalan
- Dera Bassi
- Kharar
- Kurali
- Lalru
- Mattaur
- Mullanpur
- Nayagaon
- New Chandigarh
- Rampur Sanian
- Sohana
- Tewar (Tiaur)
- Zirakpur

== Notable people ==
- Baljinder Singh (1986), racewalker. Qualified for the London Olympics 2012.
- Karam Singh Baidwan, holder of the Baidwan Estate (2000s). Besides the Baidwan Estate, Karam Singh owns 13.5% of the Sohana Village (Area-wise). Currently, Baidwan is Baidwan Confectionery's CEO. It creates the emblematic 'Milk Splash' chocolates. Baidwan had pledged ₹200 Cr. to the Sohana Project (Source of the ₹200 Cr. is contentious).

== See also ==
- Sahibzada Ajit Singh Nagar Assembly Constituency
