= List of state highways in Punjab =

This is a list of state highways and expressways in Punjab, India.

== Expressways ==
Expressways in Punjab in India are as follows:

=== Operational and under-construction ===
- 1. Delhi–Chandigarh–Shimla route.
  - 1a. Chandigarh–Shimla Expressway NH-5
    - 1a.1. Himalayan Expressway, 27 km, from Zirakpur to Parwanoo, part of Chandigarh–Shimla Expressway, operational.
  - 1b. Ambala–Chandigarh Expressway NH-152, 35 km, greenfield, operational.

- 2. Amritsar–Ludhiana–Chandigarh–Haridwar route:
  - 2a. Ludhiana–Rupnagar Expressway NH-205K, 91 km, Rs. 2792 Crore, greenfield, 4-6 lane access-controlled highway connecting Manewal village near Ludhiana on the "Delhi–Amritsar Expressway" with Bheora village near Rupnagar (Ropar or SAS Nagar) in Punjab. Land acquired for the stalled portion, which was 2 bridges, and entire route will be completed by December 2025 (Jn 2025 update).
    - 2a.1. Kharar spur, includes a 19.5 km spur to Kharar, under construction, included in the 2a (completed by December 2025).
    - 2a.2. Ludhiana Elevated Corridor, brownfield, operational.
  - 2b. Ambala-Shamli Expressway, greenfield, under-construction.
  - 2c. Chandigarh–Haridwar Expressway, greenfield, From Ramgarh to Dera Bassi, Narayangsrh, Sadhura, Pratap Nagar (Khizrabad), Behat, Bahadarabad–Roorkee, Najibabad, Afzalgarh–Kashipur. Proposed, awaiting approvals.

- 3. Delhi–Amritsar–Katra Expressway (DAKE), 670 km (420 mi), greenfield, 4-lane (expandable to 8 lanes) wide controlled-access expressway connecting Bahadurgarh border near Delhi with Katra in Jammu and Kashmir.
  - 3a. Nakodar–Amritsar Expressway (NAE) spur, greenfield.
    - 3a.1. Amritsar Ring Road, greenfield, part of Nakodar-Amritsar spur of DAKE.

- 4. Amritsar–Jamnagar Expressway EC-3 NH-754, 1,257 km, greenfield, 6-lane expressway, operational.

- 5. Ludhiana–Bathinda–Ajmer Expressway, 6-lane, Ludhiana–Bathinda greenfield, Bathinda-Taranagar greenfield, Taranagar-Fatehpur brownfiled, Fatehpur-Ajmer greenfield.

- 6. Chandigarh–Fazilka route.
  - 6a. Sirhind–Sehna Expressway, 108 km, greenfield, 6-lane access-controlled highway connecting Fatehgarh Sahib and Sehna Khera via Malerkotla, Barnala and Bathinda, under-construction in 2025.
  - 6b. Sehna–Fazilka Expressway, greenfield, via Sri Muktsar Sahib.

=== Planned but awaiting approval by the MoRTH (as of July 2025) ===
- 7. Kishtwar–Ludhiana–Hisar–Jaipur–Kota–Mandsaur Expressway,
  - 7a. Ludiana–Hisar–Jaipur–Kota Expressway, greenfield, Ballowal, Longowal, Bhuna, Hisar, Isharwal-Jhumpa, Loharu-Pilani, Surajgarh, Singhana, Neem ka Thana, Chomu, Jaipur, Phagi, Tonk-Dhooni, Bundi, Kota-Rawatbhata spur, Bjinlot (Delhi–Mumbai Expressway).
    - Isharwal–Jhumpa spur,
    - Bahal–Jui Khurd spur
    - Loharu–Pilani spur,
    - Madhogarh (Mahendragarh)–Chirawa spur
    - Singhana–Narnaul spur,
    - Behror–Nangal Chaudhary–Gudha Gorji-Fatehpur Spur.
    - Kuchaman–Khatoo–Reengus to Ajeetgarh–Shahpura spur to Delhi–Jaipur Super Expressway.
    - Jaipur spur to Delhi–Mumbai Expressway
    - Bijolia–Kota spur.
  - 7b. Sukhnai–Mungli–Kishtwar route, greenfield.
  - 7c. Kishtwar–Chamba–Ludhiana route, mix of greenfield and brownfield. From Kishtwar, Bhaderwah, Chamba, Chauti Khas, Sihunta, Tilok Nath, Jawli, Talwara, Hajipur, Passi Kandi, Nangal Bihalan, Gardiwala-Hariana brownfield, Hariana–Attowal (Hoshiarpur) greenfield, Attowal–Ludhiana brownfield
  - 7d. Kota–Rawatbhata–Mandsaur route, mix of greenfield and brownfield. From Kota, Rawatbhata, Gandhi Sagar, Rampura (with Rampura–Neemach brownfield spur), JanodMahagarh greenfield, Mahargarh–Narayangarh–Piplia Mandi (with Piplia Mandi–Malhargarh spur), Piplia Mandi–Balaguda–Palthan–Pratapgarh greenfield with PipliaMandi–Mandsaur brownfield spur.

- 8. DSDBO–Chandigarh–Hisar–Beawar–Vadodra–Mumbai route.
  - 8a. Naina Devi–Hisar–Beawar Expressway, greenfield, phase-1. From Naina Devi, Panjhera, Fatehgarh Sahib, Patiala-Sanaur, Cheeka, Kalayat-Narwana, Durjanpur, Barwala, Hisar (Airport & Satrod), Kalod, Bidhwan, Bahal, Chandgothi, Norangpura, Jhunjhunu, Sikar, Kuchaman, Makrana, Bagot, Thanwala–Pushkar, Beawar.
    - Baddi–Ropar spur
    - Chandigarh spur
    - Ambala–Patiala spur
  - Mansa–Cheeka–Pehowa spur
    - Kaithal spur
  - 8b. Naina Devi–Killar Expressway, phase-2.
  - 8c. Killar–Sasoma-DSDBO (Daulat Beg Oldie) Expressway, greenfield, phase-2, Palampur–Bharmour tunnel, Bharmour–Tindi tunnel, Killar–Padum tunnel, Alchi/Nimoo–Thoise tunnel, Thoise–Sasoma tunnel, Saser to DBO.
    - 8c.1. Sasoma–Saser La Road, under construction including tunnel under Saser La.
  - 8d. Beawar–Vadodra Expressway, greenfield & brownfield upgrades. From Beawar, Asind, Karera, Gangapur, Bhinder, Slumbar, Karwai, Halol, Godhra, Vadodra, Karjan to Dahej.
      - Rishabhdev-Slumbar-Mandsaur spur.
      - Banswara-Modasa-Gandhinagar spur

- 9. Ambala–Patiala–Sirsa–Anupgarh Expressway, greenfield, Ambala, Samana, Lehragaga-Budhlada, Sardulgarh, Rania, Elenabad–Tibbi, Pilibanga–Suratgarh, Bajuwala, Anupgarh, Chak 35A & 34A.
- 10. Ferozpur–Sangaria Expressway, greenfield, via Sri Muktsar Sahib, Malout, Sangaria/Chautala.
- 11. Abohar–Moga Expressway, greenfield, via Sri Muktsar Sahib & Faridkot.
- 12. Killar–Pathankot–Fazilka–Sri Ganganagar route.
  - 12a. Sri Ganganagar–Fazilka–Ferozpur Expressway, brownfield upgrade except Ladhuka-Khui Khera-Khuian Sarwar is greenfield.
  - 12b. Ferozpur–Sri Hargovindpur Expressway, greenfield, via Kirtowal, Govindwal Sahib & Beas.
  - 12c. Pathankot–Killar route, brownfield upgrade.

== State highways ==
Punjab has 1102.4 km of State Highways.

State Highway №	Route	Passes through - District(s)	Length (in km)
Punjab SH 1			
Punjab State Highway 8	Patiala-Pehowa		
Punjab SH 9	Dera Bassi - Barwala Road		
Punjab State Highway 10	Patiala–Rajgarh–Samana–Patran-Moonak		
Punjab State Highway 11	Ludhiana–Malerkotla–Sangrur		
Punjab SH 12A	Chandigarh–Landran–Sirhind–Mandi Gobindgarh–Nabha–Bhawanigarh-Sunam–Mansa–Kot Shamir		
Punjab SH 12B	Sirhind–Bharonpur		
Punjab State Highway 13	Mullanpur Dakha–Halwara–Raikot-Barnala		
Punjab State Highway 14	Abohar–Hanumangarh Road		
Punjab State Highway 15	Faridkot–Firozpur		
Punjab SH 16	Moga-Bagha Purana-Kotkapura-Muktsar-Malout		
Punjab SH 16A	Bagha Purana-Bhagta Bhai ka-Nathana-Bhucho Mandi		
Punjab SH 17	Bathinda–Kot Shamir-Talwandi Sabo-Sardulgarh		
Punjab SH 19	Moga–Makhu (Harike)–Bhikhiwind–Khalra		
Punjab SH 20	Zira–Ferozpur–Jalalabad–Fazilka		
Punjab SH 21	Amritsar-Chahbhal Kalan–Bhikhiwind–Khem Karan		
Punjab State Highway 24	Dasuya–Hoshiarpur–Mahilpur-Garhshankar-Balachaur		
Punjab SH 25	Amritsar–Ajnala–Ramdass–Dera Baba Nanak		
Punjab SH 41, NH 754	Bathinda - Muktsar–Jalalabad	Bathinda - Muktsar–Fazilka	78 KM

== See also ==
- Expressways of India
