= Pamal =

- village
- Location in Punjab, India Pamal (India)
- Coordinates: 30°50′17″N 75°44′25″E
- Country: India
- State: Punjab
- District: Ludhiana

Population (2006)
  - Total: 3,416

Languages
  - Official: Punjabi
- Time zone: UTC+5:30 (IST)
- PIN: 142021
- Telephone code: 161
- Vehicle registration: PB-10

Pamal is a village in Ludhiana in Punjab.

A First Anglo-Sikh War memorial has been constructed in Pamal (established in 2000), under the leadership of the most respected resident of the village and ex-army officer, Capt. Amarjit Singh Sekhon. All the funding for the memorial was made by the people of whole village community. The village is on the Mullanpur Dakha-Jodhan link road. The village has daily hourly passenger bus and Tempo services linking it with the nearest major towns/cities of Mullanpur Dakha, Dehlon and Ludhiana.

Just like all of Punjab, almost all the business in Pamal is based on agriculture.

== Statistics ==
- Population (2006 census) is 3510.
- Area (including rural area) is 17.31 km².
- Nearest Main Road is the NH 95 (National Highway 95) en route from Chandigarh to Firozpur via Ludhiana commonly known as the GT Road.
- The nearest tehsil is Ludhiana West. The nearest Sub-Tehsil is Mullanpur Dakha.
- The nearest train station is at Baddowal at a distance of 4 km.
- The village specialty is in the mother sport of Kabaddi of Punjab and have many international players. There are annual tournaments held at the stadium in the northeastern part of Pamal.

== Near villages ==
Dakha and Mullanpur village is very near to Pamal, Isewal, Phagla, Basimi, Birmi, Malakpur Bet, Humabran, Chack, Jangpur and so many others.

Pamali, less than 2 km to the south of Pamal, is Pamal's sister village.
