= Punjab State Highway 13 =

State highway in India

State Highway 13

Route information
- Maintained by Public Works Department, Punjab, State Government of Punjab, India
- Length: 57 km (35 mi)

Major junctions
- From: Mullanpur Dakha, Punjab
- To: Barnala, Punjab

Location
- Country: India
- Districts: Ludhiana and Barnala
- Primary destinations: Mullanpur Dakha, Bhora Sahib, Halwara, Raikot and Barnala

Highway system
- Roads in India; Expressways; National; State; Asian; State Highways in

Punjab State Highway 13, commonly referred to as SH 13, is a state highway in the state of Punjab in India. This state highway runs through Ludhiana district and Barnala district from Mullanpur Dakha to Barnala in the state of Punjab. The total length of the highway is 57 kilometres.

== Route description ==
The route of the highway is Mullanpur Dakha-Bhora Sahib-Halwara-Raikot-Mehal Kalan-Barnala.

== Major junctions ==
- National Highway 5 in Mullanpur Dakha
- Major District Road 53 (MDR 53) in Raikot
- National Highway 703 in Barnala

== See also ==
- List of state highways in Punjab, India
