= Jamia Mosque, Nathowal =

Mosque in Ludhiana, Punjab, India

Jamia Mosque
- Location of the mosque in Punjab, India

Religion
- Affiliation: Islam
- Ecclesiastical or organizational status: Friday mosque
- Status: Active

Location
- Location: Ludhiana, Punjab
- Country: India
- Interactive map of Jamia Mosque
- Coordinates: 30°36′42″N 75°30′42″E

Architecture
- Type: Mosque architecture
- Completed: c. 1950s

The Jamia Masjid is a Friday mosque, located in Nathowal, in the Ludhiana district of the state of Punjab, India. The mosque is situated in Nathowal, approximately 12 kilometres (7.5 mi) from Raikot, 54 kilometres (34 mi) from Ludhiana and 151 kilometres (94 mi) from the Punjabi capital city of Chandigarh.

== History ==
In the 1947 Partition of India, approximately twelve local Muslim families migrated to Pakistan; and 50 families stayed in the town, with the approval of the Sikhs, who didn't want the Muslim families to leave. The mosque was built around that time. As of 2015, Nathowal had a population of approximately 7,000, of which c. 500 were Muslims.

During 2015, Muslims, Hindus and Sikhs have contributed to the repair of the mosque. Of the Rs2.5 million invested in the project, approximately 65 percent was contributed by Sikhs and Hindus.

== See also ==
- Islam in India
- List of mosques in India
