= Punjab State Highway 24 =

State highway in India

State Highway 24

Route information
- Maintained by Public Works Department, Punjab, State Government of Punjab, India
- Length: 101 km (63 mi)

Major junctions
- From: Dasuya, Punjab
- To: Balachaur, Punjab

Location
- Country: India
- Districts: Hoshiarpur District, Shaheed Bhagat Singh Nagar District
- Primary destinations: Garhdiwala Hoshiarpur, Chabbewal, Mahilpur, Garhshankar and Balachaur

Highway system
- Roads in India; Expressways; National; State; Asian; State Highways in

Punjab State Highway 24, commonly referred to as SH 24, is a state highway in the state of Punjab in India. This state highway runs through Hoshiarpur District and Shaheed Bhagat Singh Nagar district from Dasuya to Balachaur in the state of Punjab. The total length of the highway is 101 kilometres.

== Route description ==
The route of the highway is Dasuya-Gardhiwala-Hoshiarpur-Chabbewal-Mahilpur-Garhshankar.

== Major junctions ==
- National Highway 44 in Dasuya
- National Highway 3
- NH 503 in Hoshiarpur
- Major District Road 53 (MDR 53) in Garhshankar
- NH 344A in Balachaur

== See also ==
- List of state highways in Punjab, India
