= Himalayan Expressway =

Road in India

Himalayan Expressway

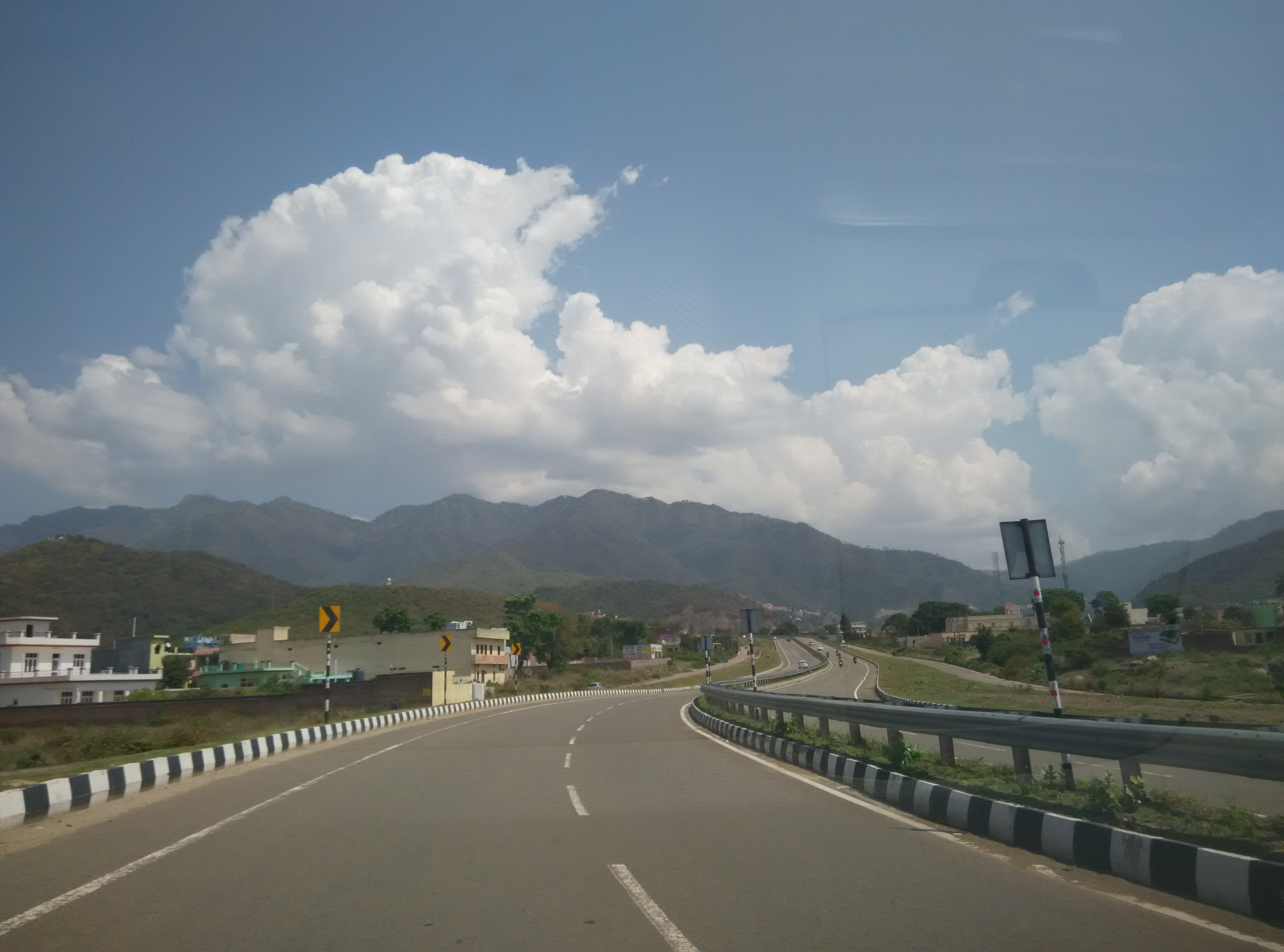

Route information
- Maintained by National Highways Authority of India (NHAI)
- Length: 27.5 km (17.1 mi)
- Existed: May 2012–present

Major junctions
- South end: Zirakpur, Punjab
- North end: Parwanoo, Himachal Pradesh

Location
- Country: India
- States: Punjab, Haryana, & Himachal Pradesh
- Major cities: Zirakpur, Panchkula, Parwanoo

Highway system
- Roads in India; Expressways; National; State; Asian

The Himalayan Expressway is a 27.5 km stretch of highway in India that runs through the Shivaliks at the trijunction of Haryana, Punjab, and Himachal Pradesh. It is part of the Chandigarh–Shimla Expressway which connects Zirakpur in Punjab to Parwanoo in Himachal Pradesh. It forms part of National Highway 5. The stretch runs through 2 km in Zirakpur, Punjab, 21 km in Panchkula, Haryana, and 4.5 km in Parwanoo, Himachal Pradesh. It was constructed by Jaypee Group.

Although the road cuts short the distance between Zirakpur and Parwanoo by only 3 km, but it helps save fuel and cuts time of travel between Delhi and Shimla by 1 hour to 7 hours, by helping commuters bypass the congested towns of Pinjore and Kalka.

In August 2023, several sections of the expressway were damaged by landslides and floods during the 2023 North India floods. Geologists argued that the cutting of the mountains for highway construction had destabilized the slopes.

== Salient Features ==
- The stretch has 32 structures including a rail overbridge, two flyovers and 11 bridges.
- Total Project cost Rs. 412 Crore.
- The 14-lane toll plaza at Chandimandir, is the first plaza in India to be fitted with radio frequency identification (RFID) technology.
- For better monitoring of mishaps, it is fitted with video incident detection system (VIDS).

== See also ==
- Expressways & highways in Haryana
- Expressways in Punjab
- Expressways in India
