= Dhakoli =

Dhakoli Dhakoli
- town
- Location in Punjab, India Dhakoli (India)
- Coordinates: 30.6553112°N 76.8426061°E
- Country: India
- State: Punjab
- District: S.A.S. Nagar Mohali

Languages
  - Official: Punjabi
- Time zone: UTC+5:30 (IST)
- PIN: 160104
- Telephone code: 1762
- Nearest city: Chandigarh
- Vidhan Sabha constituency: Dera Bassi
- Climate: Dry (Köppen)

Dhakoli is a town in the municipality of Zirakpur, Mohali District, Punjab, India (also old village Dhakuli). It was incorporated in the municipality in 1999.

Dhakoli has been an ever developing area, home to many societies with proper roads and uninterrupted water and electricity supply. The area has seen improvement in the past few years.

== Societies ==
- Dee Ess Estates
- Golden Sand Apartments
- Guru Nanak Enclave
- Guru Nanak Colony
- Gulmohar Avenue
- Gulmohar Trends
- Green City
- Green Valley Apartments
- Hill View Enclave
- Ivory Enclave
- Jagriti Apartments
- Krishna Enclave
- Krishna Enclave-2
- MS Enclave
- Maple Apartments
- Motia Huys
- Motia Heights Apartments
- Pine Homes
- Rehmat Homes
- Saraswati Vihar
- Shri Ganesh Vihar
- Savitri Greens 2
- Shalimar Enclave
- Shakti Enclave
- Solitaire Divine
- Spangle Condos
- Sushma Green Vista
- Sushma Elite Cross
- Sushma Crescent
- Sushma Urban Views

== History ==
Gurdwara Baoli Sahib is situated in Dhakoli Village, Zirakpur, in Mohali District. On his way back to Shri Anandpur Sahib after winning the Battle of Bhangani near Paonta Sahib, Shri Guru Gobind Singh Ji reached the outskirts of dhakoli. As this village was laid down by Bhai Gurditta, elder son of Shri Guru Hargobind, there were many Sikhs in the village.
