= Himmatgarh =

- village
- Country: India
- State: Punjab
- District: Mohali

Languages
  - Official: Punjabi
- Time zone: UTC+5:30 (IST)
- PIN: 140603

Himmatgarh is a village in the notified area of Zirakpur in district Mohali in state of Punjab in India.

== Housing colonies ==
- Shalimar Enclave

Vasant Vihar (Phase-I)

- Krishna Enclave
