= Nathowal =

- village
- Location in Punjab, India Nathowal (India)
- Coordinates: 30°36′42″N 75°30′42″E
- Country: India
- State: Punjab
- District: Ludhiana
- Talukas: Raikot

Population (2011)
  - Total: 3,642

Languages
  - Official: Punjabi (Gurmukhi)
  - Regional: Punjabi
- Time zone: UTC+5:30 (IST)
- PIN: 142032
- Vehicle registration: PB-10
- Nearest city: Ludhiana
- Sex ratio: 1000/907 ♂/♀

Nathowal is a village in the Ludhiana district in Punjab, India also known as ‘Faujian da Pind’ (Soldiers Village/Army Village).

== Geography ==
The village is situated 12 km from Raikot, 54 km from Ludhiana and 151 km from the capital city of Chandigarh.

== Demographics ==
According to the 2011 census, the village has the total population of 3,642 with 758 households, 1,897 males and 1,745 females.

== History ==
The village was founded in around 1706 by Baba Jassa, a Buttar Jatt from Jaisalmer, Rajasthan.

Nathowal known for sending the larger number of young recruits to the armed forces. An unflinching loyalty to the armed forces is common to the residents of Nathowal, a sentiment that has earned it the title of ‘Faujian da Pind’ (Village of Soldiers/Army men) and the village was also called Land of Martyrs as many of the freedom fighters and soldiers belongs to this village. Tucked away in a corner of Ludhiana district, amidst acres and acres of emerald fields, this village grows a bumper crop of soldiers even in this season of scarcity. Figures speak volumes: the village brags 250 soldiers, around 16 of them stationed at J&K, and as many ex-servicemen. Many families from the village can still trace back their ancestry to one of the seven individuals now known as Seven Leaves (Satt Pattian) who initially started the village.

== Culture ==
Punjabi is the mother tongue as well as the official language of Nathowal. The village is predominated by the Jatts of Buttar community/clan. Other Jatt clans include Sekhon, Sandhu, Khangura, and Sidhu.

=== Religion ===
Religion in Nathowal
Religion	Percent
Sikhism	92.14%
Islam	7.14%
Hinduism	0.72%

Nathowal has a population of around 7000. Majority of the villagers follows Sikhism. There are about 70 Muslim families also, with the population of around 500. Around 50 members are those of Hindus.
In 1947, Muslims of this village didn't migrate to Pakistan (excepting one or two families) because Sikhs and Muslims of this village treats each other with great love and lives in peace and harmony.
The village have three Gurudwaras and a Mosque as religious sites for worship.

== Economy ==
Agriculture is the main source of income. All the villagers are attached to Agriculture in direct or indirect way. Many of them are government employees mostly in Indian Army or another paramilitary forces.
The main crops of the village are: Cotton, Wheat and Rice.
