= Mullanpur =

Mullanpur may refer to the following settlements in Punjab, India:

- Mullanpur Dakha, a town in Ludhiana district
- Mullanpur Garibdass, a town in Mohali (SAS Nagar) district
