= Bishanpura =

- Village
- Location in Punjab, India Bishanpura (India)
- Coordinates: 30°45′N 76°03′E
- Country: India
- State: Punjab
- District: Mohali

Bishanpura is a village in the notified area of Zirakpur in Mohali district, Punjab, India.

There was a proposal in 1999 that the village, along with those of Lohgarh, Himatgarh, Bishangarh, Baltana, Zirakpur, Dhakoli and Nabha Sahib, would be formed into a Nagar panchayat. An area of the village became the dumping ground for waste from the rapidly expanding Zirakpur until the state government order local authorities to desist, which then led to claims in 2010 that Zirakpur had turned into an eyesore and was at risk of an epidemic.

Rapid increases in prices for real estate in the area caused the state government to increase the property registration rates by up to 233% in April 2011.

The village is within the boundaries of the Abohar wildlife sanctuary, which includes protected species such as the black buck and the blue bull.
