= Pabhat =

Bhabat
- town
- Country: India
- State: Punjab
- District: Mohali

Languages
  - Official: Punjabi
- Time zone: UTC+5:30 (IST)
- PIN: 140603

Bhabat is a town in Notified Area Committee of Zirakpur in district Mohali in state of Punjab in India.
