= Punjab State Highway 15 =

State highway in India

State Highway 15

Route information
- Maintained by Public Works Department, Punjab, State Government of Punjab, India
- Length: 30 km (19 mi)

Major junctions
- From: Ferozpur, Punjab
- To: Faridkot, Punjab

Location
- Country: India
- Districts: Ferozpur, Faridkot
- Primary destinations: Ferozpur, Faridkot

Highway system
- Roads in India; Expressways; National; State; Asian; State Highways in

Punjab State Highway 15, commonly referred to as SH 15, is a state highway in the state of Punjab in India. This state highway runs through Ferozpur District and Faridkot District from Ferozpur to Faridkot in the state of Punjab. The total length of the highway is 30 kilometres.

== Route description ==
The route of the highway is Ferozpur-Golewala-Faridkot

== Major junctions ==
- National Highway 5 in Ferozpur

== See also ==
List of state highways in Punjab, India
