= Dadhahur =

- village
- Location in Punjab, India Dadhahur (India)
- Coordinates: 30.584335°N 75.573240°E
- Country: India
- State: Punjab
- District: Ludhiana
- Talukas: Raikot

Languages
  - Official: Punjabi
  - Regional: Punjabi
- Time zone: UTC+5:30 (IST)
- Website: www.dadhahur.com

Dadhahur is a village in Punjab, India.

The tehsil of this village is Raikot in Ludhiana district.

A canal called Bathinda branch canal, crosses through the village and flows to Bathinda.

A small market and bus stop is located near the canal.

== Schools ==
There are four schools in the village.

School name	Class Grade	Medium	Board
Govt. Elementary School	1-5 Class	Punjabi	PSEB
Govt. Model Sen. Sec. School	6-12 Class	Punjabi	PSEB
Guru Hargobind Public School	1-12 Class	English	PSEB
Raag Ratan Academy	Gurbani Classes	Punjabi	----

== Hospitals ==
There are two health centers in the village.

1. Dispensary for mother & child care. ( Govt. Approved )

2. Vaternary Hospital. ( Govt. Approved )
