= Mahendra Chaudhary Zoological Park =

Zoo in India

Chhatbir Zoo Mahendra Chaudhary Zoological Park
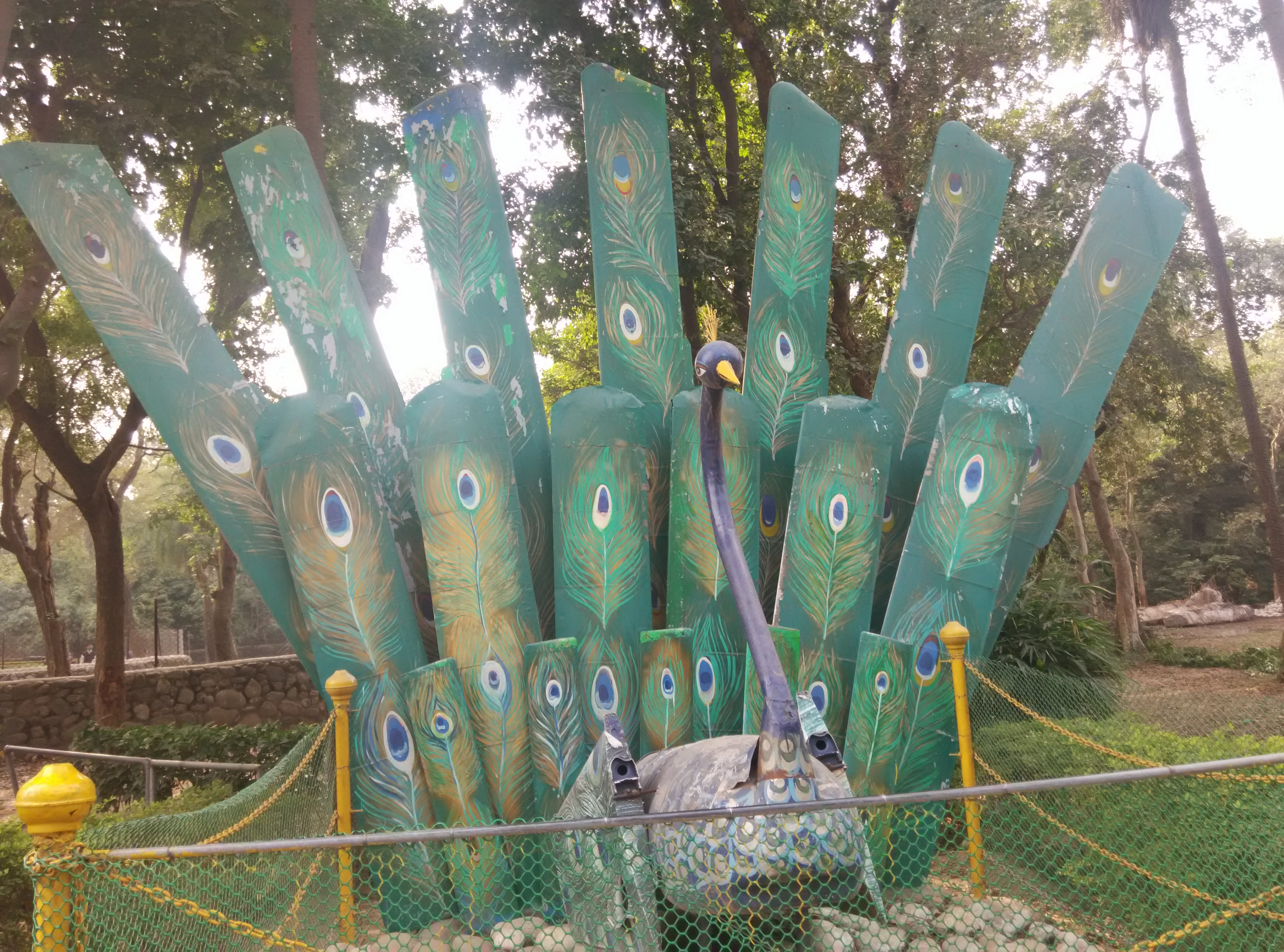
- Interactive map of Chhatbir Zoo; Mahendra Chaudhary Zoological Park
- 30.6036°N 76.7928°E
- Date opened: 1977
- Location: Chhat Village, Zirakpur, Punjab, India
- Memberships: CZA
- Major exhibits: Lion Safari

Chhatbir Zoo (formally Mahendra Chaudhary Zoological Park), is a zoological park situated close to Zirakpur, India. The zoo was constructed in the 1970s and is home to a large variety of birds, mammals and reptiles.

Lying on the Chandigarh-Zirakpur-Patiala route, this zoo is located about 20 km away from Chandigarh. The zoo was christened as the Mahendra Chaudhary Zoological Park after then governor of Punjab, Mahendra Chaudhary in 1977. A small number of animals brought from the Guwahati Zoo, Assam. It soon became the largest zoo in Punjab. Chattbir has India's longest walk-in aviary with 300m long walk showcases 32 species of indigenous and exotic birds. The section is made in five different themes included Terrestrial, Rock & Duck, Woodland, Japanese Trail and Rainforest. The zoo is home to 369 mammals, 400 birds and 20 reptiles.

Non-exhaustive list:

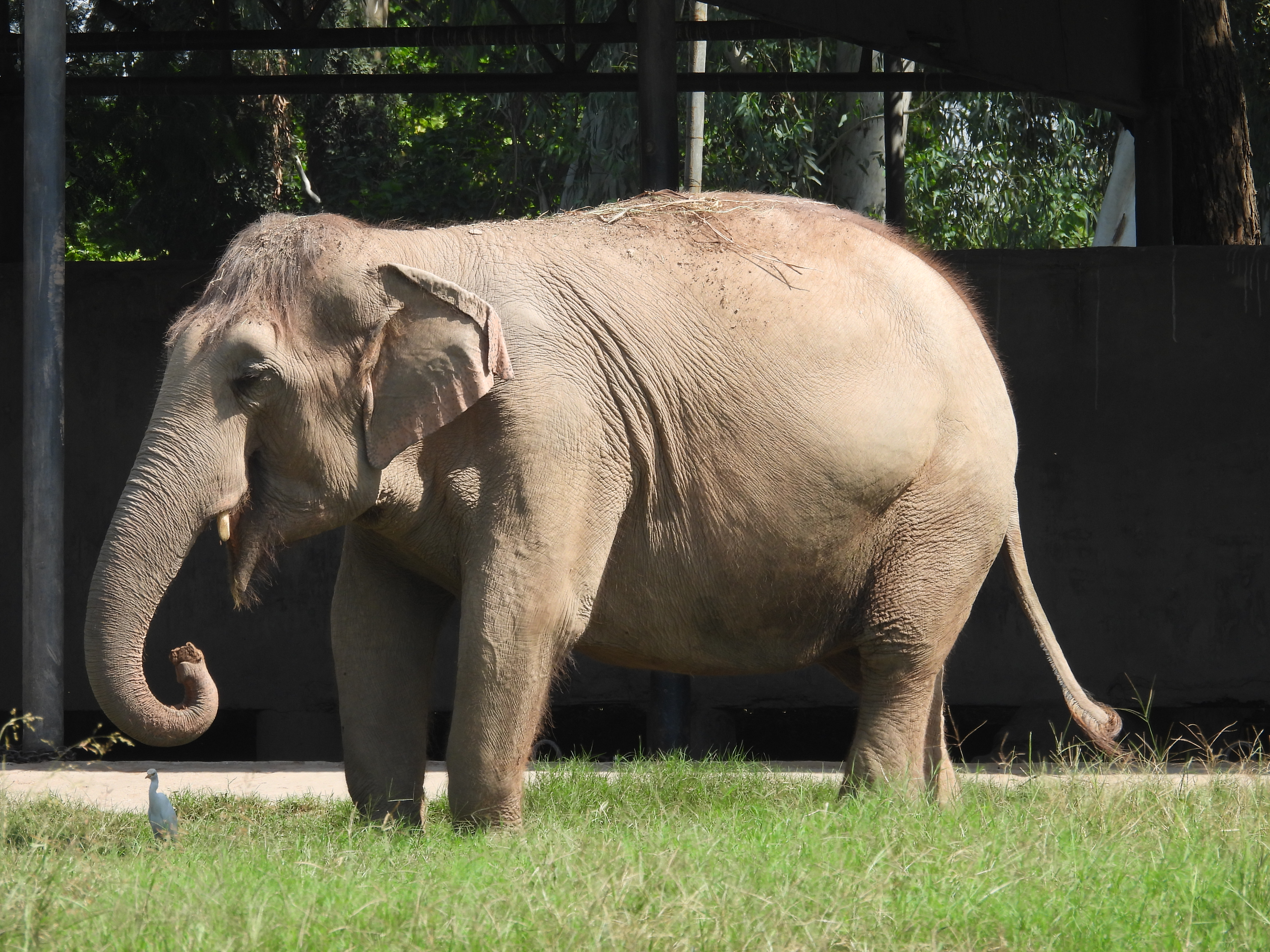
Elephant in Mahendra Chaudhary Zoological Park

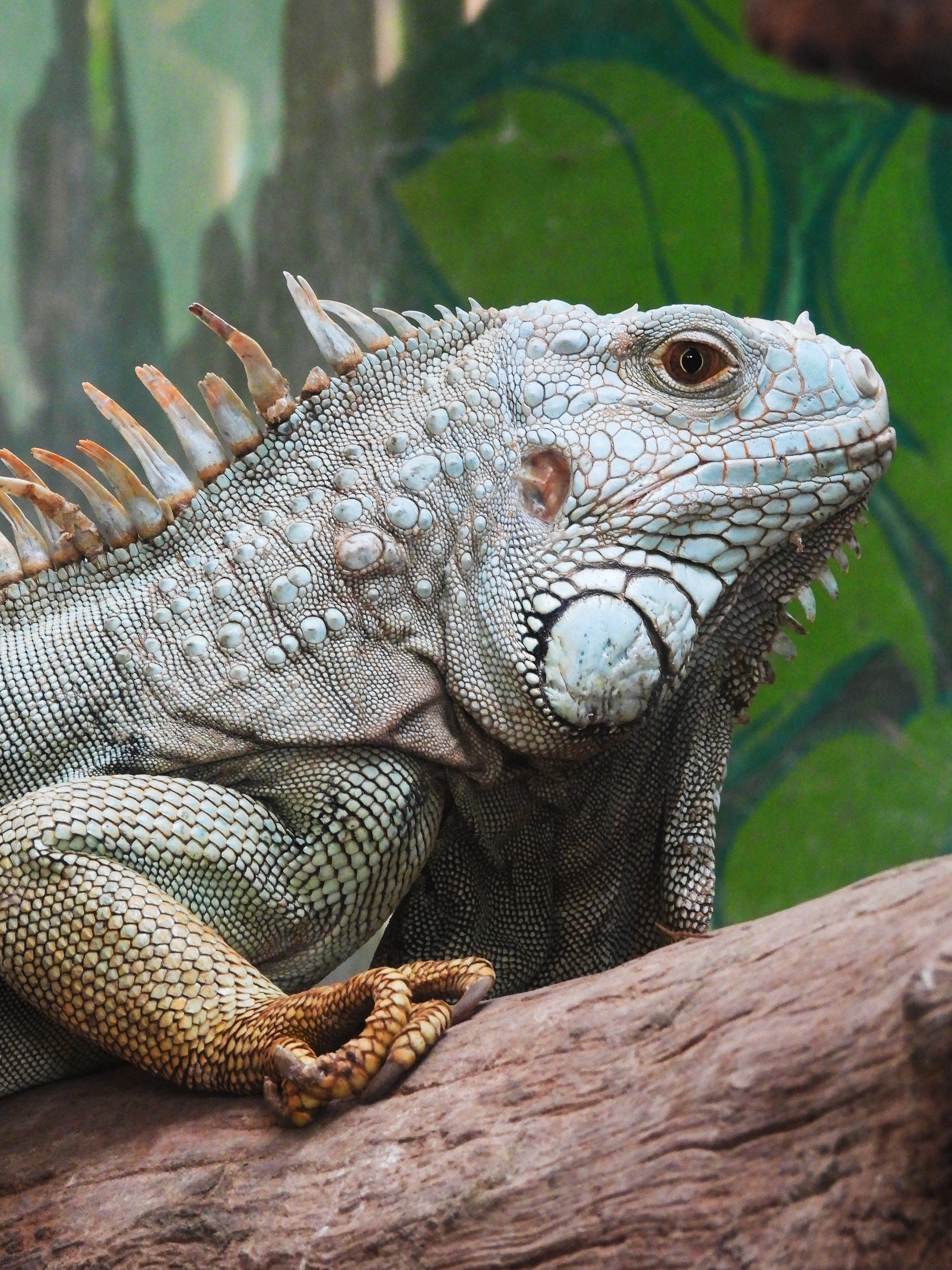
Iguana

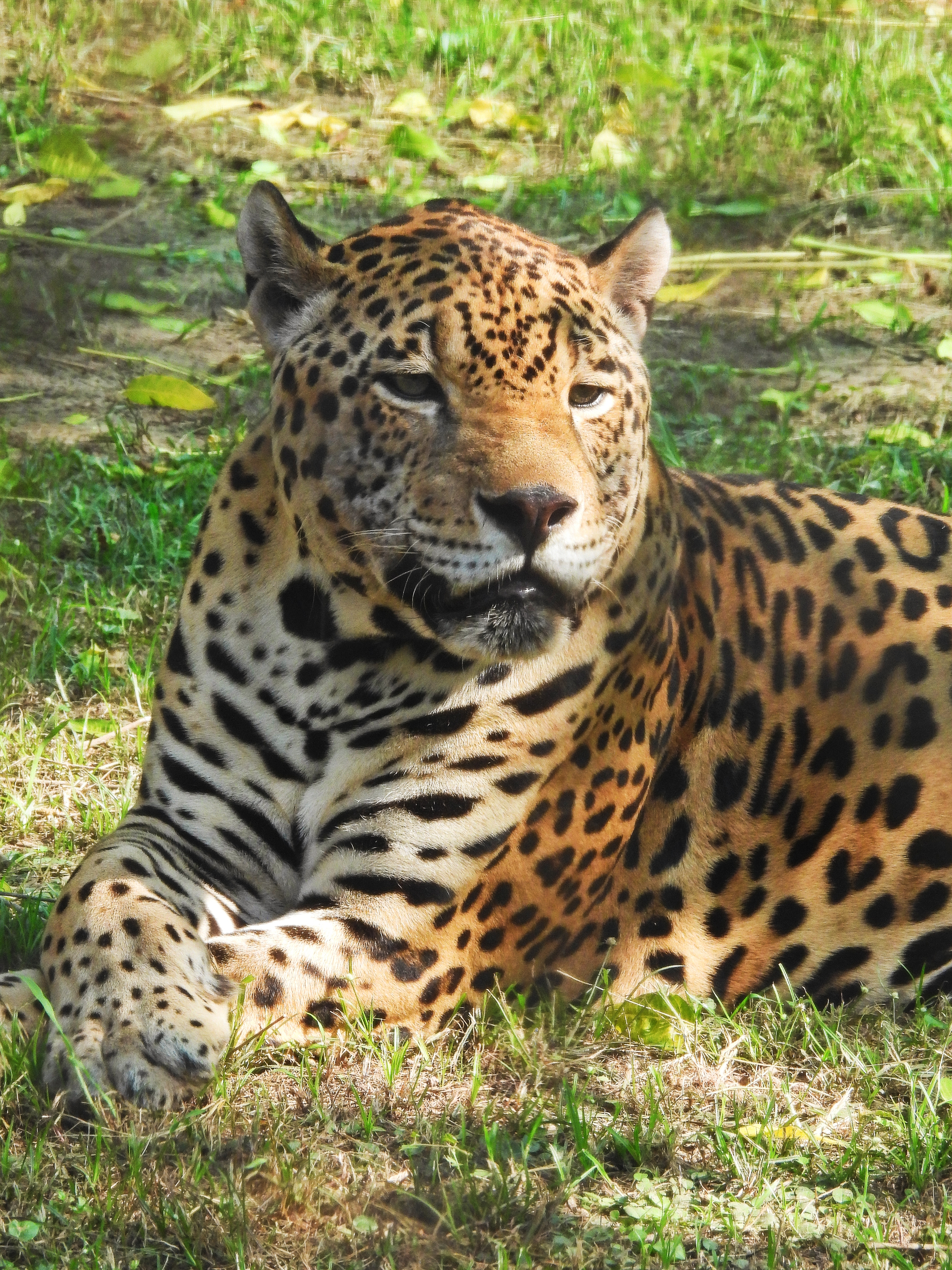
Jaguar

- Asian palm civet
- Asiatic lion
- Barasingha
- Bengal fox
- Bengal tiger
- Blackbuck
- Chinkara
- Chital
- Common marmoset
- Four-horned antelope
- Gaur
- Golden jackal
- Hamadryas baboon
- Himalayan black bear
- Himalayan goral
- Hippopotamus
- Indian crested porcupine
- Indian elephant
- Indian leopard
- Indian spotted chevrotain
- Indian wolf
- Jaguar
- Jungle cat
- Leopard cat
- Lion-tailed macaque
- Nilgai
- Northern pig-tailed macaque
- Rhesus macaque
- Sambar deer
- Sloth bear
- Smooth-coated otter
- Striped hyena
- Black swan
- Common ostrich
- Emu
- Indian peafowl
- Java sparrow
- Painted stork
- Rose-ringed parakeet
- Sarus crane
- White stork
- Gharial
- Green iguana
- Indian cobra
- Indian python
- Indian star tortoise
- Mugger crocodile
