= Ludhiana Elevated Corridor =

Route information
- Length: 13 km (8.1 mi)

Major junctions
- North end: Octroi post
- South end: Samrala Roundabout

Location
- Country: India
- States: Punjab
- Major cities: Ludhiana

Highway system
- Roads in India; Expressways; National; State; Asian

Ludhiana Elevated road is an elevated expressway corridor in Ludhiana city of Punjab, India. The project was implemented by the National Highways Authority of India (NHAI) at an estimated cost of ₹1,000 crore and was completed in January 2024.

== See also ==
- Expressways & highways in Haryana
- Expressways in Punjab
- Expressways in India
