= Bhabat =

Bhabat Bhabat
- town
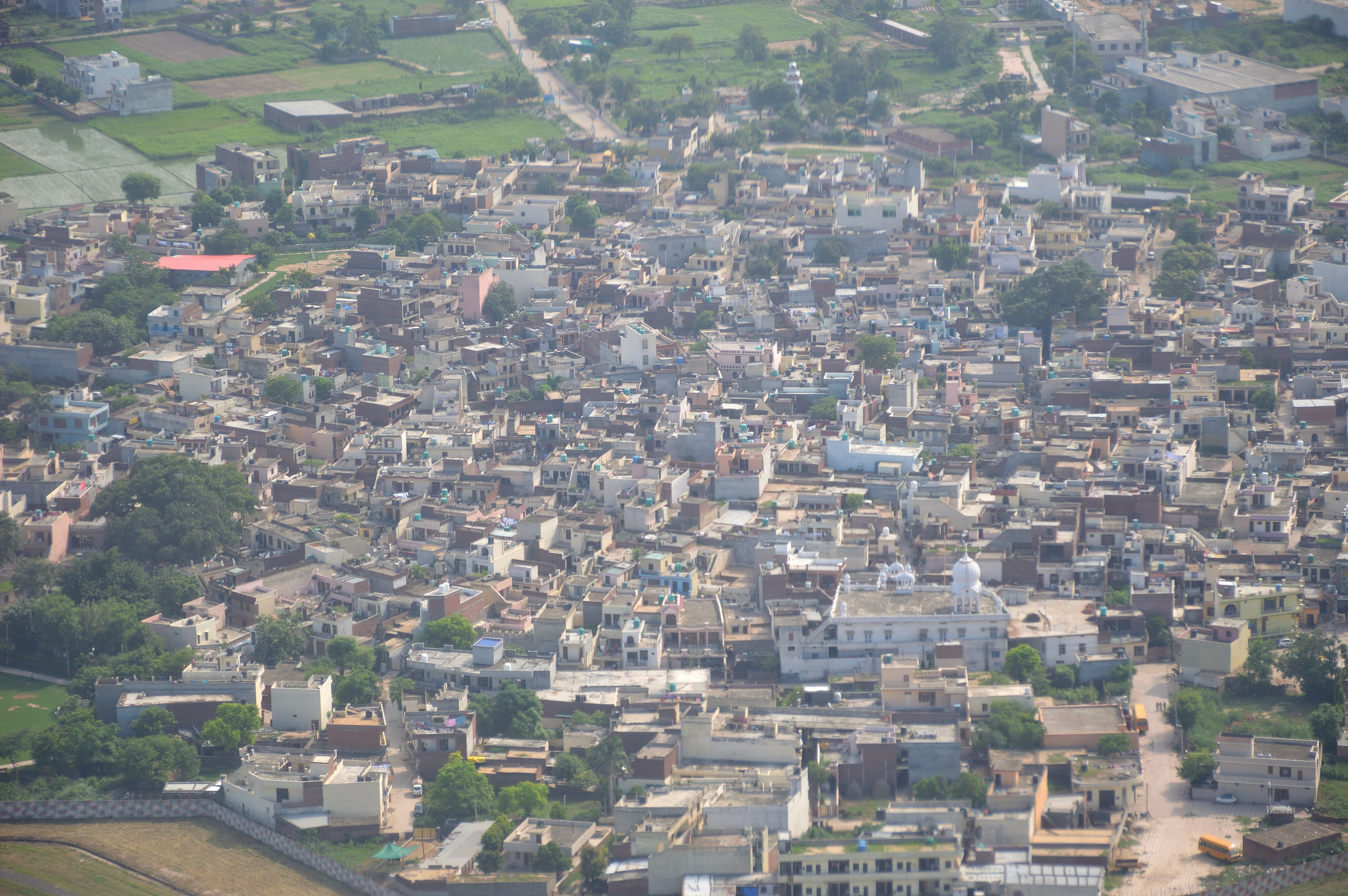
- Northern aerial view of Bhabat

- Location in Punjab, Mohali Bhabat (India)
- Coordinates: 30.6581°N 76.8076°E
- Country: India
- State: Punjab
- District: Mohali

Languages
  - Official: Hindi, Punjabi
- Time zone: UTC+5:30 (IST)
- PIN: 140603
- Nearest cities: Chandigarh, Mohali

Bhabat / Pabhat is the northern part of the town in the notified area of municipality of Zirakpur, Mohali District, Punjab, India.

== Demographics ==
As of the 2001 Indian census, Males constitute 53% of the population and females 47% in the total population of the town.
