= Taksal =

- Town
- Location in Himachal Pradesh, India Taksal (India)
- Coordinates: 30.8480792°N 76.960001°E
- Country: India
- State: Himachal Pradesh

Languages
  - Official: Hindi
  - Native: Mahasui (Baghati)
- Time zone: UTC+5:30 (IST)
- Vehicle registration: HP

Taksal is a village in Himachal Pradesh, India. Lying in the foothills of the Himalayas, it lies just above Parwanoo (Solan district). Taksal got its name from takka which means coins and because it used to be a place where coins were made in the time of kings. Today, it contains an Outpost of the Government Railway Police.
