= Peer Muchalla =

Peer Muchalla Peer Mashalla
- Town
- Country: India
- State: Punjab
- District: Mohali

Population
  - Total: 37,000

Languages
  - Official: Punjabi
- Time zone: UTC+5:30 (IST)
- PIN: 140603

Peer Muchalla is a town in Municipal Council Zirakpur in district Mohali in state of Punjab in India. It adjoins Sectors 20 and 21 of Panchkula.

Proximity to Chandigarh, Mohali, Panchkula and Airport is attracting property builders to this area. Peer Muchalla, Kishanpura, Sanauli areas of Zirakpur are seeing rapid development being nearest to the planned townships of HUDA and GMADA Aerocity respectively.
