= Khangura =

The Khangura (ਖੰਗੂੜਾ in Punjabi) is a gotra of the Jat community from the Punjab region in India.

The Khangura community of the gotra of the Jat community are primarily residents of the Princely State of Kangra. The name Khangura comes from the Persian language, meaning "follower of the guru," and the Khangura community was influenced by the teachings of the Sikh gurus, from which they were accepted as residents of the Princely State of Kangra. The Khangura community protected the ruler of the Princely State of Kangra as well as the Princely State of Kangra, from which there are thousands of tales of humour.

Khangura community are devotees of Guru Tegh Bahadur, the ninth Sikh prophet (Guru) (1621–1675), and Guru Gobind Singh, the tenth Sikh prophet (Guru) (1666–1708). The Khangura clan are almost all adherents of Sikhism now.

Historically Khangura Jatts held in Nanu Mazara also known as Nano Mazara Sardar Hukam Singh Khangura Son of Sardar Natha Singh Khangura is the first sarpanch of village Nanu Mazara, Ladha Ganja, and parts of Samrari and Mahl in Tehsil Phillaur. There is also a village, Toderwal, near Nabha distt., Patiala, which is the village of all Khanguras.

The Jathera of the Khangura Jatt Clan are village Samrari in Jalandhar District, Punjab, and village Malakpur in Ludhiana District. Jathera is the place of the grave mound of the common ancestor and is still worshipped even today by Jats. These sites are also called Wadae Wadhere.

There also is a village called Akoi Sahib, near Sangrur in Punjab, which almost entirely comprises Jatts of the Khangura clan. One of the great builders of North India, especially of colonial India's capital, New Delhi, was Sardar Rai Bahadur Narain Singh, who belonged to the village Akoi Sahib and was from the Khangura clan.

They have traditionally, like many Jatts, been farmers. Recently many Khanguras have emigrated to Canada, the United Kingdom, the United States, and there are a few in New Zealand, Italy and Australia.

There also is a village named Khangura, in Punjab. Previously called Phagorey (www.khangura.org.in). There is a Gurdwara named Gurdwara Baba Khabe Aana Sahib in the village. Moreover, there is a cement pipe factory in the village that distributes cement pipes for underground irrigation in all over the Punjab. There is one govt. school, a playground, and three Gurdwaras (two inside and the other one outside the village). The village is situated very near to the Phagwara bypass and National Highway 1 (GT Road). The village is approximately 5 km away from the Phagwara to Jalandhar side. S. Rakhbir Singh is Sarpanch of the village at the moment.

== Distribution ==
They are mostly found in the Jalandhar, Ludhiana and Kapurthala districts of Punjab, and have around 15-25 villages. They are also found in the Patiala, Moga, and Sangrur Districts in the Malwa Region of Punjab, and in Haryana, they are found in Village Ratta of the District Fatehabad. In western Punjab (Pakistan), they are found in Sialkot, Narowal, Sheikhupura, and Gujranwala districts.

There is also a village named Mian Khangura in district Narowal in Punjab, Pakistan.

There are 9 villages near Adampur. Pandori, Khangurain, Ram Nagar Dhaha, Badowal, Mandialan, Todo Majara, Begampur Jandiala, and Talwandi Arayian are mostly Jats with this surname. The village named Akoi Sahib, 4 km from Sangrur on Ludhiana Rd., has a population mostly of Khanguras only. Village has the historic gurudwara visited by three gurus "first, sixth and ninth gurus" therefore has been named as Akoi sahib. Other villages in Sangrur distinct from those with a sizable Khangura population are Batriana, Akbarpur, Bijalpur. In Ludhiana Distt., the village Malakpur also has a few well-established Khangura families. There are a few influential Khangura families residing in the Latala and Ghangas villages of Ludhiana as well. Other villages with a sizable Khangura population are Bhadla (near Khanna), Aitiana, and Sunet.

== Khangura people ==
Sardar Agar Singh Khangura was a famous Sikh warrior during the Sikh Misl period from 1716 to 1799. He was a friend of the Sikh Emperor Sardar Chhajja Singh Dhillon (1716–1746) of the Bhangi Sikh misl (1716–1810).

Most recently, two brothers who appeared on a Channel 4 documentary "Hunted" produced by Shine TV (UK): Harinder Singh & Davinder Singh.
