= Punjab State Highway 14 =

State highway in India

State Highway 14

Route information
- Maintained by Public Works Department, Punjab, State Government of Punjab, India
- Length: 21 km (13 mi)

Major junctions
- From: Abohar, Punjab
- To: Rajasthan Border, Punjab

Location
- Country: India
- Districts: Fazilka District
- Primary destinations: Abohar, Azimgarh, Rajasthan Border

Highway system
- Roads in India; Expressways; National; State; Asian; State Highways in

Punjab State Highway 14, commonly referred to as SH 14, is a state highway in the state of Punjab in India. This state highway runs in Fazilka District from Abohar to Rajasthan Border in the state of Punjab. The total length of the highway is 21 kilometres.

== Route description ==
The route of the highway is Abohar-Azimgarh-Wahabwala-Rajasthan Border.

== Major junctions ==
- National Highway 62 in Abohar

== See also ==
List of state highways in Punjab, India
