= Punjab State Highway 10 =

State highway in India

State Highway 10

Route information
- Maintained by Public Works Department, Punjab, State Government of Punjab, India
- Length: 75 km (47 mi)

Major junctions
- From: Patiala, Punjab
- To: Moonak, Punjab

Location
- Country: India
- Districts: Patiala and Sangrur
- Primary destinations: Patiala, Samana, Patran and Moonak

Highway system
- Roads in India; Expressways; National; State; Asian; State Highways in

Punjab State Highway 10, commonly referred to as SH 10, is a state highway in the state of Punjab in India. This state highway runs through Patiala district and Sangrur district from Patiala to Moonak in the state of Punjab. The total length of the highway is 75 kilometres.

== Route description ==
The route of the highway is Patiala-Samana-Ghagga-Patran-Moonak

== Major junctions ==
- National Highway 7 in Patiala

== See also ==
- List of state highways in Punjab, India
