= Punjab State Highway 8 =

State highway in India

State Highway 8

Route information
- Maintained by Public Works Department, Punjab, State Government of Punjab, India
- Length: 32 km (20 mi)

Major junctions
- From: Patiala, Punjab
- National Highway 7 in Patiala
- To: Haryana Border, Punjab

Location
- Country: India
- Districts: Patiala District
- Primary destinations: Patiala, Devigarh, Pehowa

Highway system
- Roads in India; Expressways; National; State; Asian; State Highways in

Punjab State Highway 8, commonly referred to as SH 8, is a state highway in the state of Punjab in India. This state highway runs through Patiala district from Patiala to Haryana Border, Punjab on Pehowa highway in the state of Punjab. The total length of the highway is 32 kilometres.

== Route description ==
The route of the highway is Patiala-Bhunarheri-Devigarh-Dudhan-Haryana Border

== Major junctions ==
- National Highway 7 in Patiala

== See also ==
- List of state highways in Punjab, India
