= Nanu Mazara =

- Village
- Location in Punjab, India Nanu Mazara (India)
- Coordinates: 31.1718959°N 75.8582622°E
- Country: India
- State: Punjab
- District: Jalandhar

Government
  - Type: Panchayat raj
  - Body: Gram panchayat
- Elevation: 240 m (790 ft)

Population (2011)
  - Total: 327
- Sex ratio 171/156 ♂/♀

Languages
  - Official: Punjabi
- Time zone: UTC+5:30 (IST)
- PIN: 144501
- Telephone: 01826
- ISO 3166 code: IN-PB
- Vehicle registration: PB- 08
- Website: jalandhar.nic.in

Nanu Mazara or Nano Mazara is a village in Jalandhar district of Punjab State, India. It is located 11.6 km from Phagwara, 28 km from Phillaur, 37.4 km from district headquarter Jalandhar and 119 km from state capital Chandigarh. The village is administrated by a sarpanch who is an elected representative of village as per Panchayati raj (India).

== Demography ==
According to the report published by Census India in 2011, Nanu Mazara has a total number of 70 houses and population of 327 of which include 171 males and 156 females. Literacy rate of Nanu Mazara is 78.26%, higher than state average of 75.84%. The population of children under the age of 6 years is 28 which is 8.56% of total population of Nanu Mazara, and child sex ratio is approximately 750 lower than state average of 846.

Most of the people are from Schedule Caste which constitutes 40.37% of total population in Nanu Mazara. The town does not have any Schedule Tribe population so far.

As per census 2011, 114 people were engaged in work activities out of the total population of Nanu Mazara which includes 96 males and 18 females. According to census survey report 2011, 94.74% workers describe their work as main work and 5.26% workers are involved in marginal activity providing livelihood for less than 6 months.

== Transport ==
Goraya railway station is the nearest train station; however, Phagwara Junction train station is 12.5 km away from the village. The village is 57.6 km away from domestic airport in Ludhiana and the nearest international airport is located in Chandigarh also Sri Guru Ram Dass Jee International Airport is the second nearest airport which is 132 km away in Amritsar.
