= Garhdiwala =

Town and municipal district in Punjab, India

- City
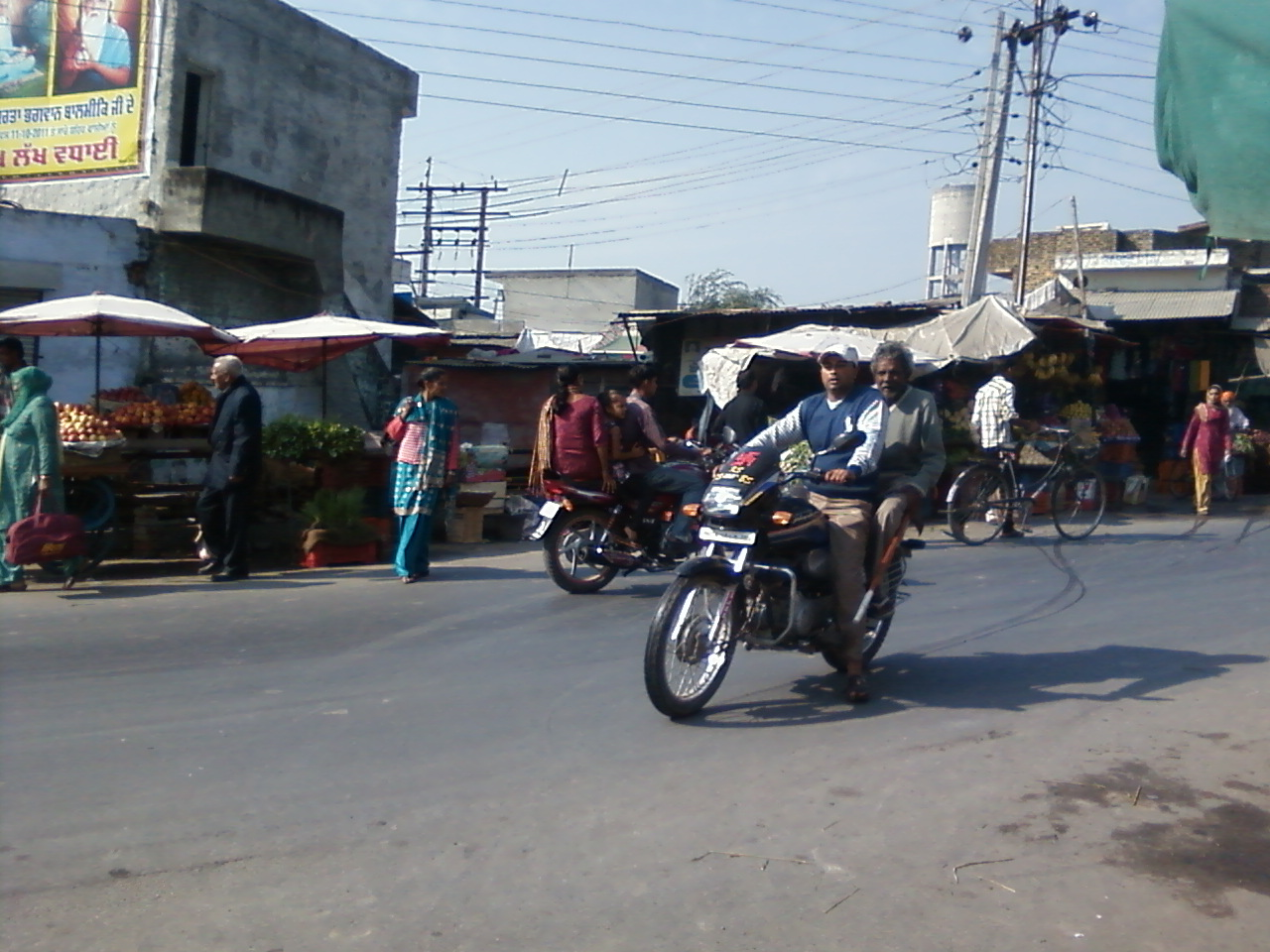

- Location in Punjab, India
- Coordinates: 31.7325°N 75.7506°E
- Country: India
- State: Punjab
- District: Hoshiarpur
- Founder: Chaudhary Garhia Sahota

Government
  - Body: Municipal Council

Population (2011)
  - Total: 7,593

Languages Punjabi
  - Official: Punjabi
- Time zone: UTC+5:30 (IST)
- PIN: 144207
- Area code: +91 1886
- Vehicle registration: PB07,PB21

Garhdiwala is a town and municipal council in Hoshiarpur district in the state of Punjab, India.

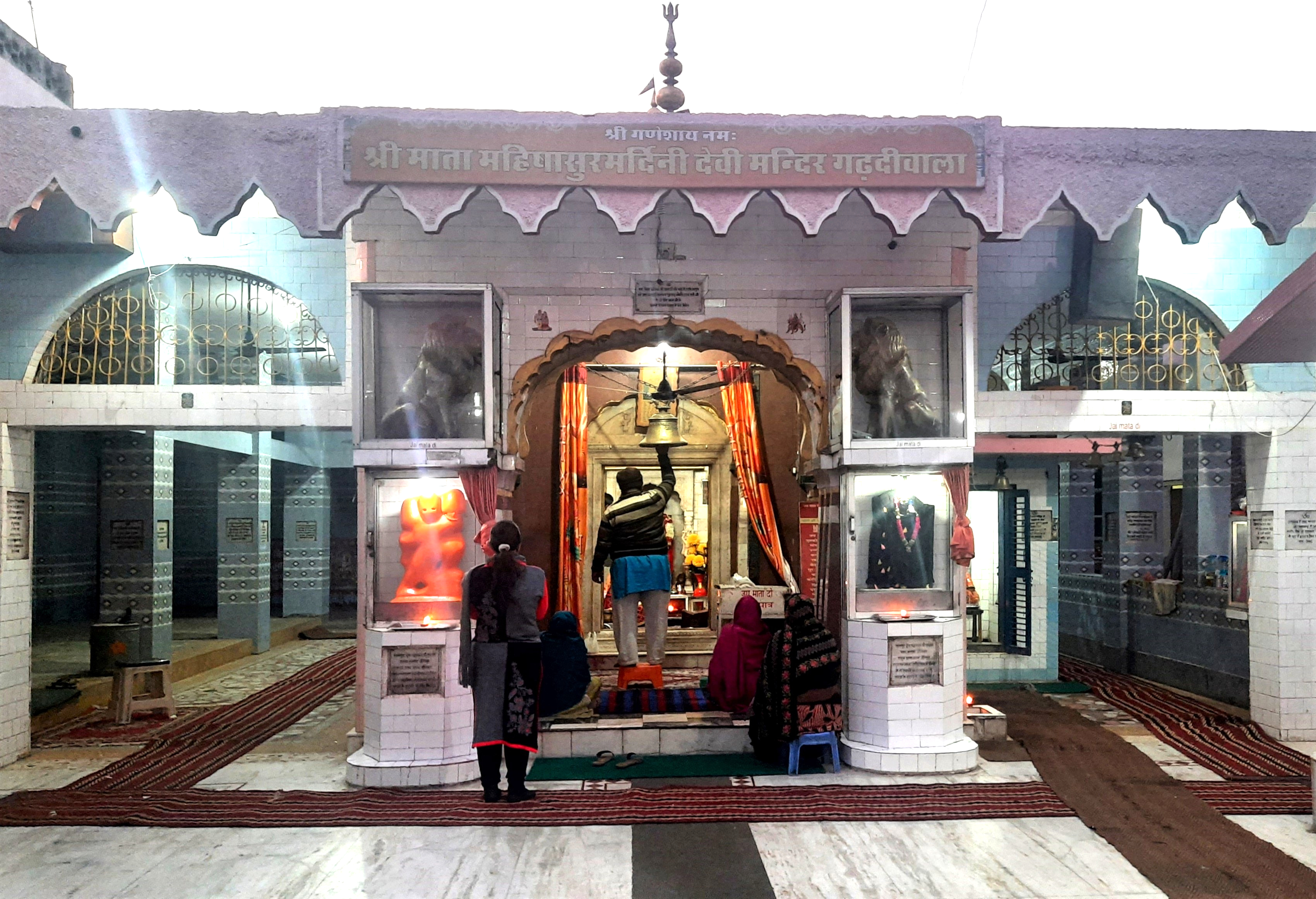
Devi Mandir, Garhdiwala.

== History ==
The town was founded in 1443 by Chaudhary Garhia Sahota, who was the landlord of the area at the time. The town had a Devi Mandir and was therefore initially known as 'Garhia devi wala'. During the Sikh Confederacy, the name was changed to Garhdiwala.

The town was the seat of Sahota Jatt Chaudhris/Jagirdars of the area, during the Mughal Empire and it is also mentioned in the 1595 Mughal Zamindar record list of Suba Lahore.

== Demographics ==
As of 2011 census in India, Gardhiwala had a population of 7593. Males constitute 51% of the population and females 49%. Garhdiwala has a higher literacy rate compared to Punjab. In 2011, the literacy rate of Garhdiwala was 87.24% compared to 75.84% of Punjab: Male literacy stands at 92.82% while the female literacy rate was 81.73%.

The table below shows the population of different religious groups in Gardhiwala town, as of the 2011 census.

Population by religious groups in Gardhiwala town, 2011 census
Religion	Total	Female	Male
Hindu	5,242	2,514	2,728
Sikh	2,214	1,123	1,091
Muslim	60	27	33
Jain	54	24	30
Christian	19	9	10
Other religions	1	1	0
Not stated	3	2	1
Total	7,593	3,700	3,893
