= Parwanoo =

- Town
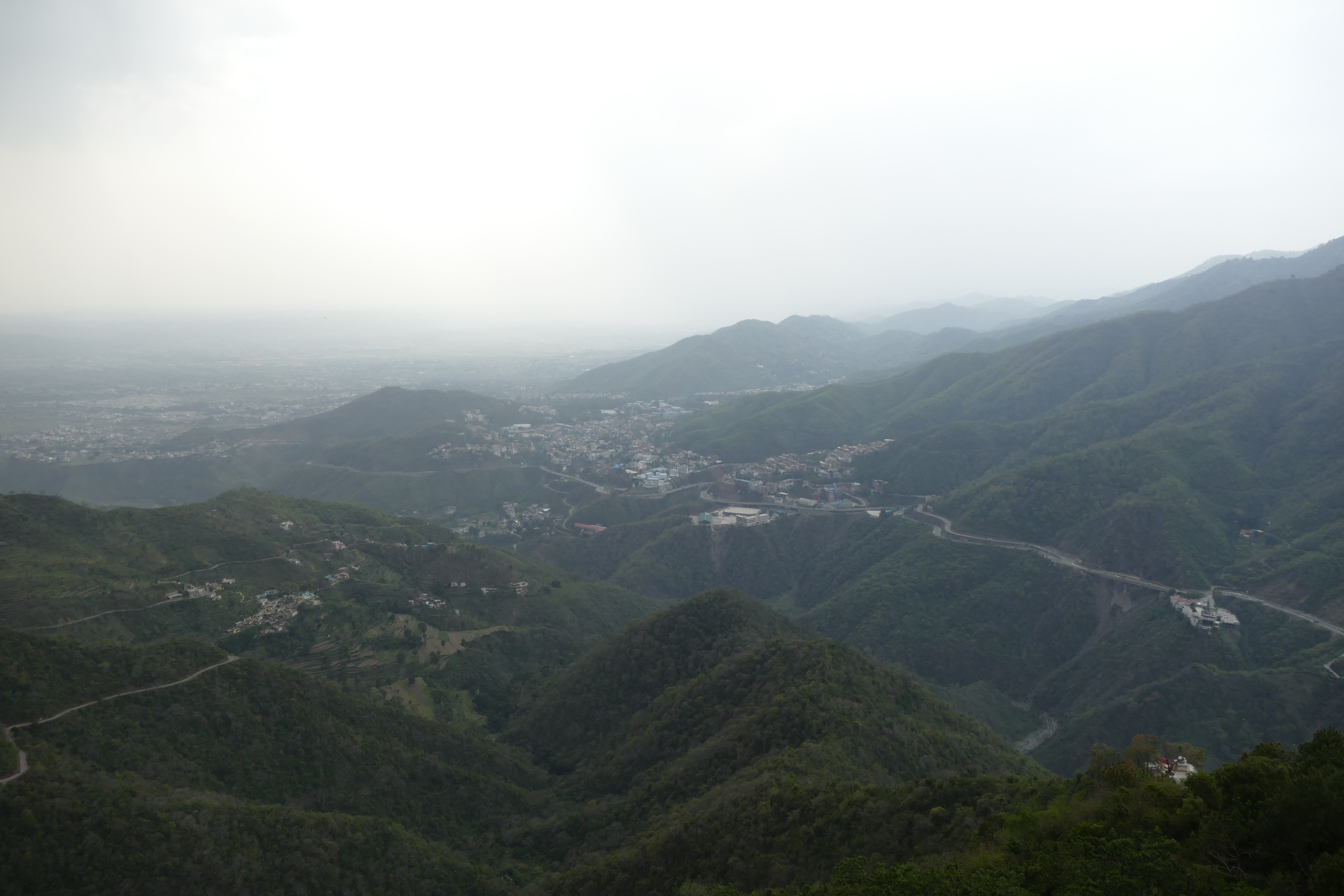
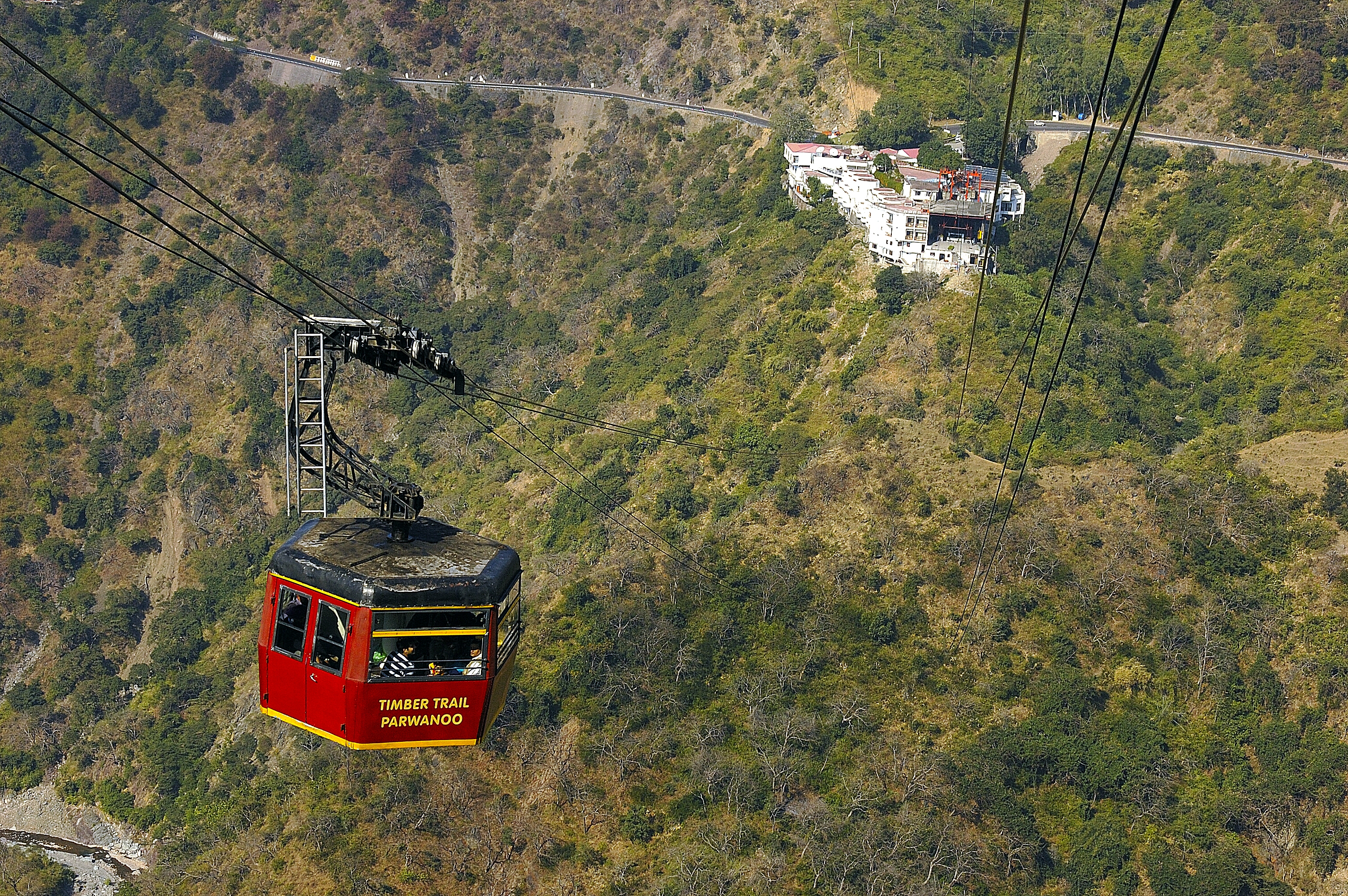
- From top to bottom: Bird eye view of Parwanoo, Timber Trail at Parwanoo
- Nickname: Shanu City
- Location in Himachal Pradesh, India Parwanoo (India)
- Coordinates: 30.83806°N 76.9585°E
- Country: India
- State: Himachal Pradesh
- District: Solan

Government
  - Type: State Government

Population (2001)
  - Total: 8,609

Languages
  - Official: Hindi
  - Native: Mahasui (Baghati)
- Time zone: UTC+5:30 (IST)
- Postal code: 173220

Parwanoo or Parwanu is a Municipal council in Solan district in the Indian state of Himachal Pradesh. It is an industrial town. It has Himachal's biggest wholesale market. First in 3rd-category (less than 3 lakhs population) of Swachh Vayu Sarvekshan award 2023. Second in 3rd-category (less than 3 lakhs population) of Swachh Vayu Sarvekshan award 2025. It borders Panchkula district of Haryana, and is after the towns of Pinjore and Kalka on the Chandigarh Simla Highway. In fact it is separated by a river bed from the town of Kalka. Pinjore to Parwanoo is almost a continuous urban belt. From Pinjore there is also a road to Baddi, another nearby industrial city of Himachal.

== Overview ==
The town is divided into 6 different sectors spread randomly across the Shivalik Range in a radius of about 4 km. While sectors 1A, 4 and 6 are totally residential the other sectors 1, 2, 3 and 5 are Industrial with only a few residential areas. Parwanoo is essentially an industrial town with almost 80% of the local population engaged with the industries in one way or another. It is home to the largest fruit processing unit of HPMC and the HP Agro Industries have a Cattle Feed Unit and a Pesticide Unit located here. It also has a Large ESI hospital. Prominent resort situated in the place is Timber Trail Resorts.

== Economy ==
Employment is largely driven by the government, industrial plants and tourism. Education and horticultural produce processing, comprise most of the remainder. In addition to being the local hub of transportation and trade.

== Transport ==
The Kalka-Shimla Heritage rail line passes through this town. The railway station is known as Taksal. The town is 35 km from Chandigarh and 20 km from Panchkula. There is also a route to Kasauli direct from Parwanoo, 18 km avoiding Dharampur. HRTC has bus depot in Parwanoo some famous routes of HRTC Parwanoo are: Parwanoo-Manali, Parwanoo-Delhi, Parwanoo-Nahan and Shimla-Pathankot.

== Climate ==
Parwanoo has a moderate climate. Winter temperature is approximately 10 degrees Celsius, with Summer temperatures rarely exceeding 38 degrees Celsius or more. The general wind direction is south-west to north-east. Total rainfall for the year is 1020 millimeters, with humidity at 90% in September and 28% in April.

Parwanoo has been ranked 9th best "National Clean Air City" under (Category 3 population under 3 lakhs cities) in India.

== Industries ==
To cash in on its proximity to Chandigarh and Panchkula the government set up industrial sectors and gave incentives that invited many small scale units to set up shop here. The incentives include exemption from taxes and financing incentives for expansion of existing projects. Parwanoo is also marketing centre for apple crop in Himachal Pradesh. All sale and purchase of apple crop in Himachal Pradesh takes place from Parwanoo Apple Mandi.

Some big business houses situated in Parwanoo are:

- Morepan Laboratories
- Microtek India
- Mahle Group
- Fujiyama Power Systems (UTL)
- JP Healthcare

== Famous ==
Dhalli on its northern outskirts (on the Simla highway) is famous for its meat (Non Veg pickles) shops which is run by the Walia family. A resort with a cable car called Timber Trail is a few miles north of the town on the Shimla-Chandigarh highway again. Around 6 km away from the town centre is the famous 17th Century Pinjore Gardens, a sprawling 100-acre heritage park with attractions including lawns, a mini zoo and plant nursery. Rock inscriptions by King Ashoka in Bramhi language were discovered in Parwanoo. The rocks are called Kali Pathri by the locals. The town is 35 km from Chandigarh and 20 km from Panchkula.

== Demographics ==
As of 2001 India census, Parwanoo had a population of 8609. Males constitute 61% of the population and females 39%. Parwanoo has an average literacy rate of 73%, higher than the national average of 59.5%: male literacy is 74%, and female literacy is 71%. In Parwanoo, 12% of the population is under 6 years of age.

=== Languages ===
Languages spoken in Parwanoo Town (2011)
1. Hindi (47.1%)
2. Baghati (15.2%)
3. Bhojpuri (10.3%)
4. Punjabi (12.4%)
5. Nepali (4.59%)
6. Maithili (1.83%)
7. Others (8.50%)

== Educational institutions ==
The various schools in the town are:

- Govt. Sr. Sec. School
- Anand School
- Eicher School
- DAV Public Senior Secondary School
- National Public School
- Lotus school
- I Genius School
- Parwanoo public school
