= Malakpur Bet =

Malakpur bet Malakpur Bet
- Village
- Location within India
- Coordinates: 30°55′43″N 75°44′20″E
- Country: India
- State: Punjab
- District: Ludhiana
- Tehsil: Ludhiana West

Population (2013)
  - Total: 2,200
- Time zone: UTC+05:30 (IST)
- Pincode: 142027
- Distance From Ludhiana: 10 km
- Distance From Chandigarh: 110 km

Malakpur bet is a village in Ludhiana-2 Block in Ludhiana District in Punjab, India. The population was estimated as 2,200 in 2011. It has an area of about 480 hectares.

It is situated on the Ludhiana to Hambran Road to the west of Ludhiana, 3 km from the Sutlej River. It is very near to Punjab Agricultural University and to South City Ludhiana. Malakpur bet is 10.30 km far from its Main Town, Ludhiana, and 110 km from the State Main City Chandigarh. The nearest railway station is at Lludhiana, 8 km away.

The tehsil of Malakpur bet Is Ludhiana (West); the tehsil number is 147. Malakpur bet's pincode is 142027.

== Etymology ==
Malakpur bet (ਮਲਕਪੁਰ ਬੇਟ) is derived from malak (angel) and is related to the name of a person. The term pur occurs approximately 30 times in the Rig Veda; it is often translated as city, castle or fortress.

== History ==
Malakpur bet is a very old village. Before the partition of India and Pakistan in 1947, most of the population were Muslims. After 1947, the Muslims moved to Pakistan and Sikhs came to the village. Most of the jatt Sikhs in Malakpur have the surnames Grewal, Gill, Sekhon. Most of Grewals had come from Layallpur (Pakistan) and are natives of Himmayun pura village of Ludhiana. Most of the Sekhons were natives of Dakha village in Ludhiana District. The main source of income of village people is agriculture.

== Pin code ==
Malakpur bet PIN code (Postal Index Number) is 142027 and it post office name is Ayali KalanN. Other villages using this PIN are Ayali Khurd, Malakpur bet, Ayali Kalan, Birmi and Jainpur.

== Nearby villages ==
Nearby villages are Birmi (1.67 km), Ayali Khurd (3.40 km), Nurpur Bet (3.44 km), Partap Singhwala (3.8 km), Bains (5.30 km), Ayali Kalan (5.77 km), Jhamat (3.44 km), Hambran (6.55 km) and Jainpur (632.31 m)

== See also ==
- Ludhiana
- Punjab, India
- India
