= Chabbewal =

- Village
- Location in Punjab, India
- Coordinates: 31.445506°N 75.990264°E
- Country: India
- State: Punjab
- District: Hoshiarpur

Languages
  - Official: Punjabi
- Time zone: UTC+5:30 (IST)

Chabbewal is a Village in the district of Hoshiarpur, Punjab, India, with a population of 2698.

Chabbewal is situated just in the middle of Hoshiarpur and Mahilpur stretch about 10 km each side on State Highway 24 of the state Punjab that connect Dasuya, Pathankot to Chandigarh. Chabbewal is a now major shopping center that attracts neighboring villagers regularly. It is a major Bus Stop for villagers in and out of that area. The town has five High Schools, and a very renowned Girls College - Shri Guru Har Rai Sahib College for Women. It now has the Guru Gobind Singh Polytechnic College in village Handowal Kalan which is rich in Technical diploma courses. It is the first institute in Hoshiarpur district to provide vocational diploma in engineering through the NSQF scheme of AICTE.

The main clan in Chabbewal is the Jatt Clan - Jhuty (or Jhutti / Jhooti, or Jhutty). The neighboring villages house many historical Gurdwaras (Baba Rattan Singh Ji / Nattrala, Harian-Vellan - Jathedar Sant Baba Nihal Singh Ji) and has produced many football players for the state, such as Harfateh.J . Many people have migrated to foreign countries from this area: The UK, Canada, The US, Norway, Australia and other parts of Europe.

It is a well established village with many past and present political figures. Moreover, there is now an established Police Station present in Chabbewal, plus the town is host to the biggest peas (mutter) supplying market (mandi) in Asia. There is a strong footballing background in the town. This had led to a Football Academy being established, which has played host to some of the top football players in Punjab, and has been play by Harfateh Singh Jhutty while it hosts big football tournaments every summer and winter.

Chabbewal has produced many soldiers that have served the Indian Armed Forces.
