= Chandigarh–Shimla Expressway =

Road in India

Shimla Chandigarh Expressway

Route information
- Length: 120 km (75 mi)

Major junctions
- From: Chandigarh
- To: Shimla

Location
- Country: India
- States: Himachal Pradesh, Chandigarh

Highway system
- Roads in India; Expressways; National; State; Asian

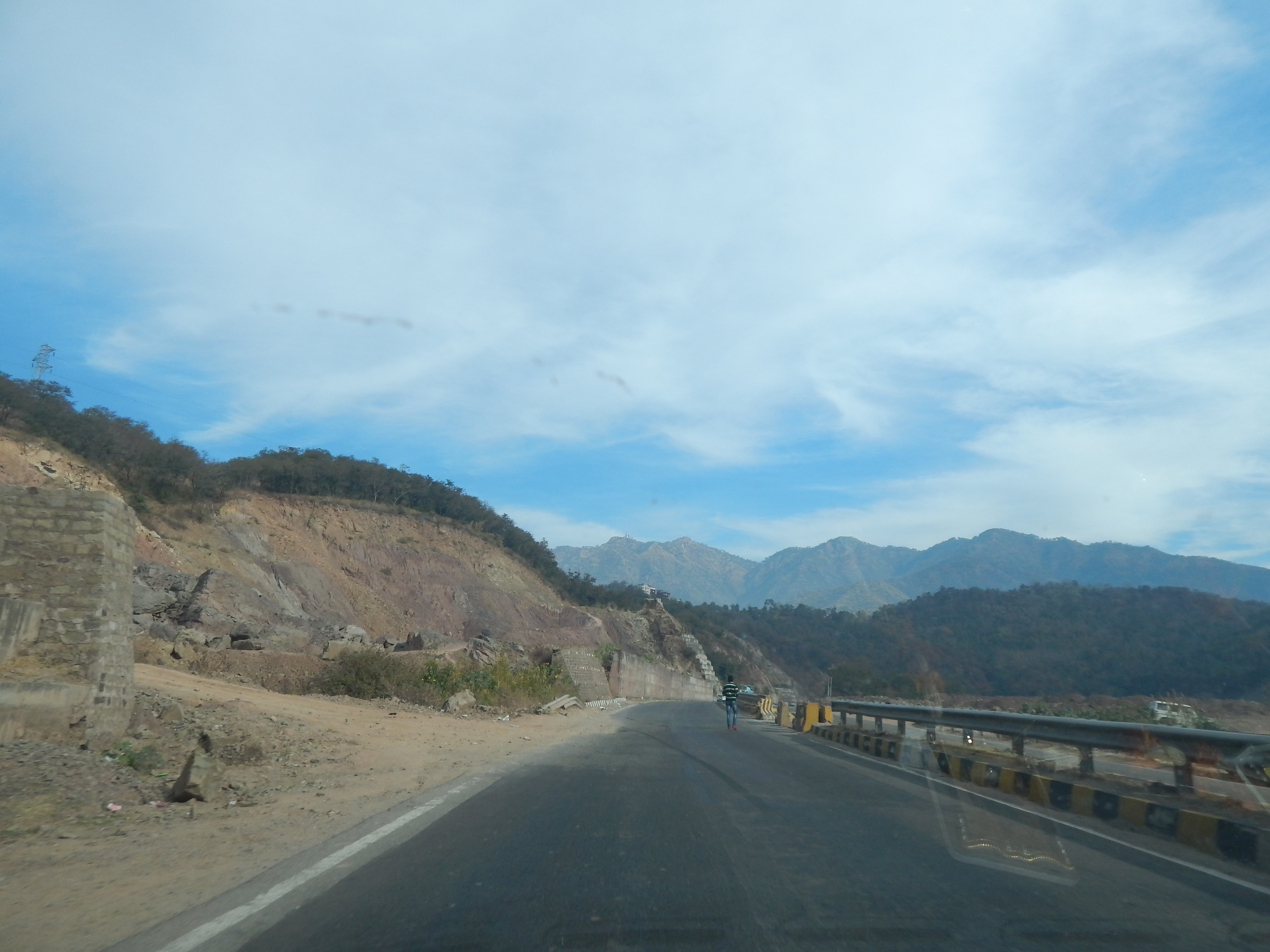

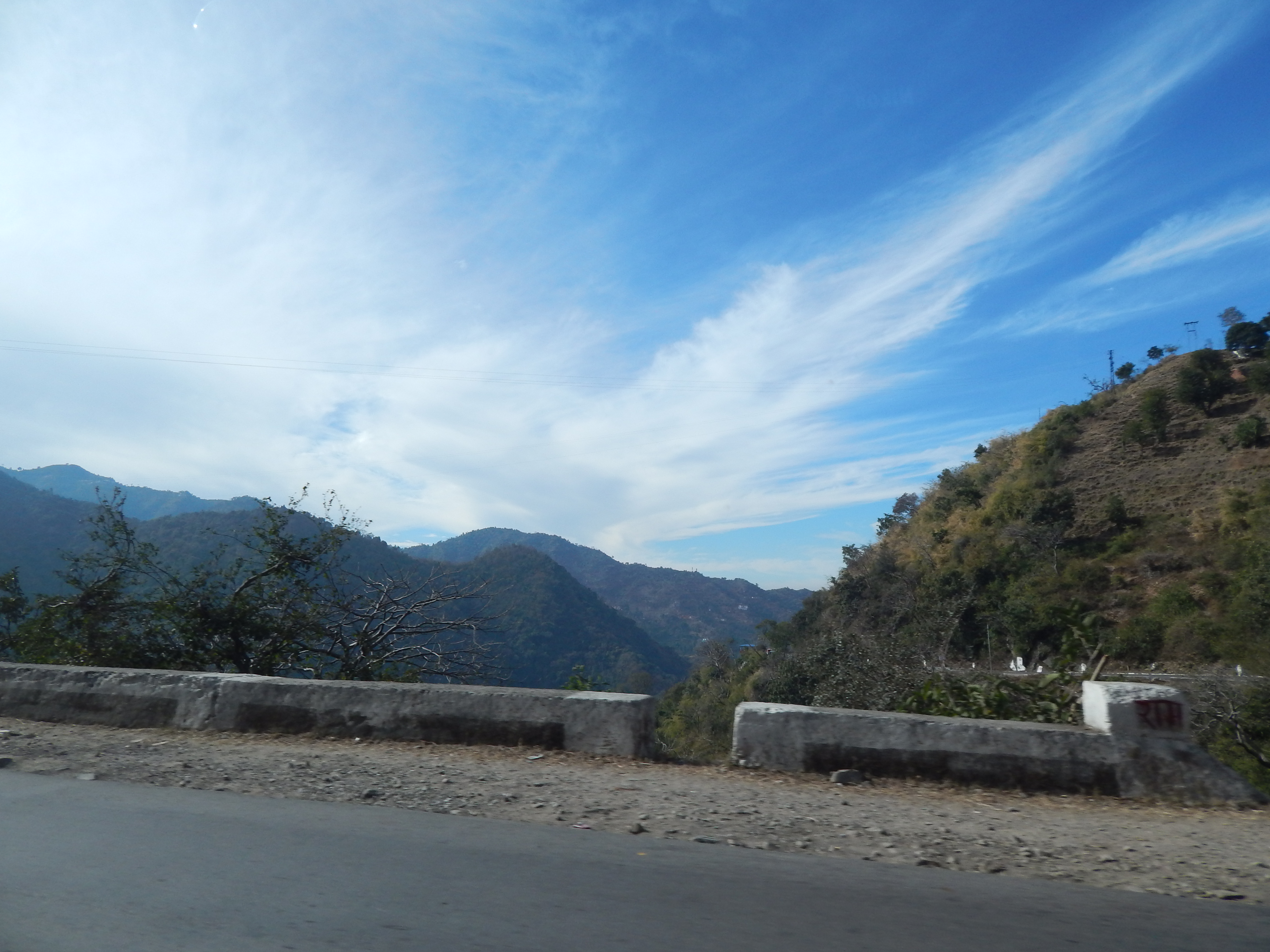

The Shimla Chandigarh Expressway is an under construction 120 kilometres (75 mi) long expressway connecting Chandigarh to Shimla stretch of National Highway 5 (India).The four laning project involves the creation of 11 tunnels between Maliana (Shimla) and Kothi to help reduce the distance by 19 km. The total length of the tunnels will be 9.5 km. The two longest tunnels will be of 2.27 km each between Taradevi and Shoghi and Kandaghat and Solan. The state government wants that the highway be realigned and include more tunnels to reduce the distance by another 20 km. The Himalayan expressway stretch of it was opened in June 2021.

== Four lane project ==
In September 2015, Construction works are commenced on the project.

On 27 September 2016, tenders were invited for the construction of Solan-Kaithlighat section, with last submission date as 11 November 2016.

As of February 2017, the project is facing delay due to legal issues and construction works on the first phase are kept on hold.

Earlier the project was put on hold due to legal issues; however the project resumed in June 2017.

In August 2023, several sections of the expressway were damaged by landslides and floods during the 2023 North India floods. Geologists argued that the cutting of the mountains for highway construction had destabilized the slopes.

== See also ==
- Expressways & highways in Haryana
- Expressways in Punjab
- Expressways in India
