= Jangpur =

- village
- Location in Punjab, India Jangpur (India)
- Coordinates: 30.832°N 75.682°E
- Country: India
- State: Punjab
- District: Ludhiana
- Tehsil: Ludhiana West
- Sub-Tehsil: Mullanpur
- Bloc: Sudhar

Government
  - Type: Panchayati raj (India)
  - Body: Gram panchayat

Population (2011)
  - Total: 2,738

Languages
  - Official: Punjabi
  - Second language: Hindi
  - Third language: English
- Time zone: UTC+5:30 (IST)
- PIN: 141101
- Telephone code: 0161
- ISO 3166 code: IN-PB
- Vehicle registration: PB-10
- Nearest city: Ludhiana
- Vidhan Sabha constituency: Dakha
- Lok Sabha constituency: Ludhiana West
- Website: jangpur.com

Jangpur is a village of Ludhiana District in Punjab, India. It had a population of around 2,738 in the 2011 Indian census, most of whom are engaged in agricultural work. The village is located approximately 18 km (11 mi) southwest of Ludhiana and 2 km (1.2 mi) from Grand Trunk Road.

== Religious places, festivities and sports ==
Jangpur is home to a diverse range of worship spaces, reflecting its rich religious and cultural heritage. The village has two Sikh Gurdwaras, a Hindu Mandir along with Mata Rani, a Sufi Khanqah (also known as Khaneghah, meaning "house of the present time"), a Muslim Masjid, and an unaffiliated (non-orthodox) Asthaan Baabe Shaheedan, which translates to "place of the martyr elders."

Jangpur hosts a variety of religious and non-religious events throughout the year. The village is also known for its strong sporting culture, particularly in football (soccer). The local youth display a keen interest in the sport, and Jangpur has its own football team, Jangpur Football Club (JF).
