= Mullanpur Dakha =

Mullanpur Dakha Dakha
- Town
- Location in Punjab, India
- Coordinates: 30.84°N 75.67°E
- Country: India
- State: Punjab
- District: Ludhiana

Government
  - Body: Municipal corporation

Population (2011)
  - Total: 16,356

Languages
  - Official: Punjabi
- Time zone: UTC+5:30 (IST)
- PIN: 141101
- Telephone code: 0161
- Vehicle registration: PB-10

Mullanpur Dakha, also known as Mandi Mullanpur, is a town located in the Ludhiana district in the Indian state of Punjab. It is a nagar panchayat, a settlement in transition from rural to urban. Due to the availability of transport routes to other villages, the town serves as a marketplace of grain and other goods to the surrounding area.

== Demographics ==
According to census data from 2011, Mullanpur Dakha had a population of 16,356. Males constituted 8,595 of the population and females constituted 7,761. Mullanpur Dakha has a literacy rate of 79.41%, somewhat above the national average of 74.04%.

== Transportation ==
Mullanpur is located on National Highway 5 (NH 5). It has bus services to Bathinda, Moga, and Ludhiana. It also has a railway station with trains to Chowkimann, 7 km (4.3 mi) away, and Ludhiana Junction, 19 km (12 mi) away. The closest airports are Chandigarh International Airport, located 134 km (83 mi) away, and Sri Guru Ram Dass Jee International Airport, 167 km (104 mi) away in the city of Amritsar. Nearby villages include Jangpur, Issewal, Mullanpur, Bhanohar, Raqba, Pandori, Rurka, Dakha, Kailpur, Braich and Mohie.

== Markets and colonies ==
Meena Bazaar is the main market in Mullanpur. Other markets situated on Raikot Road are Dakha Complex and Sekhon market(s).

Sher Singh Flour Mills is located on Jagraon Road.

Health and Medical Facilities in Mullanpur Dakha are S. Hari, Saran Hospital, Pandori Nursing Home, Seerat Nursing Home, Madho Ram Medical, Ashmeen Medicos, Punjab Medical, and Dhaliwal Medical.

Colonies: Oldest colony is Purani Mandi. Other main colonies are Bank Colony, Link Road, College Road, Harnek Nagar, S. Bhagat Singh Nagar, Harnam City (Jangpur Road) and Dashmesh Nagar.

== Education ==
The major local educational institutions are senior secondary schools: Guru Nanak Public School, Mullanpur, Guru Teg Bahadur National Public Senior Secondary School, Dakha (also known as GTB School, Dakha, Eastwood International School, Mullanpur, and Peace Public School, Bhanohar. Colleges in the area are Guru Teg Bahadur National College, Dakha (also known as 'GTB National College, Dakha' and 'Dakha College'), Guru Teg Bahadur National Institute of Management and Technology, Dakha (also known as GTBIMT, Dakha), PCTE Group of Institutes, Baddowal, Ludhiana Group of Colleges, Chowkiman, Bajaj College, Chowkiman, and Guru Hargobind Khalsa College, Gurusar Sadhar (also known as 'Sadhar College').A Plus alpha Arrowhead institute of education.

== Trusts and gurdwaras ==
Gurmat Bhawan is the main and most popular trust in Mullanpur, helping to educate poor and handicapped children.

The most famous gurdwara – a place of worship for Sikhs – in Mullanpur is Gurdwara Mashkiana Sahib. It is a place of great historical significance. Other Gurdwaras include Sri Guru Hargobind Sahib, Gurdwara Singh Sabha Sahib and Gurudwara Baba Vishwkarma. Nirankari Bhawan is also located near Pandori Nursing Home at Jagraon Road.
