= Raikot =

- Municipal council
- Location in Punjab, India
- Coordinates: 30.65°N 75.6°E
- Country: India
- State: Punjab
- District: Ludhiana
- Elevation: 235 m (771 ft)

Population (2011)
  - Total: 28,734
- Time zone: UTC+5:30 (IST)
- PIN: 141109
- Telephone code: 01624
- Vehicle registration: PB 56

Raikot is a city and municipal council in Ludhiana district in Indian state of Punjab. Raikot is one of the tehsils in Ludhiana district of Punjab. there are total 76 villages in this tehsil.

== List of villages in Raikot ==
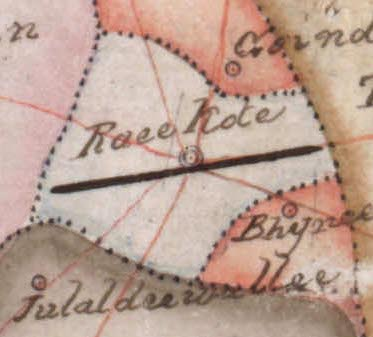
Detail of the main, continuous tract of territory of Raikot chieftainship from a map created by the British East India Company, ca.1829–1835.

A list of villages in Raikot tehsil is as follows:

- Abuwal
- Acharwal
- Aitiana
- Akalgarh
- Akalgarh
- Andlu
- Baraich
- Barmi
- Barundi
- Basraon
- Bassian
- Bhaini Baringan
- Bhaini Darera
- Bhaini Rora
- Binjal
- Boparai Khurd
- Brahampur
- Budhel
- Burj Hakima
- Burj Hari Singh
- Burj Littan
- Burj Naklian
- Chak Bhai Ka
- Chak Chhajjewal
- Dadahur
- Dangon
- Dhalian
- Dhurkot
- Ghuman
- Gobindgarh
- Gondwal
- Halwara
- Heran
- Hissowal
- Jalaldiwal
- Jand
- Jatpura
- Jhoraran
- Johlan
- Kaila
- Kalas
- Kalsian
- Kishangarh
- Leel
- Littar
- Lohatbadi
- Maherna Kalan
- Nangal Kalan
- Nangal Khurd
- Nathowal
- Nurpur
- Pakhowal
- Rupa Patti
- Pheru Raian
- Rachhin
- Rajgarh
- Rajgarh
- Rajoana Kalan
- Rajoana Khurd
- Ramgarh Sibian
- Rattowal
- Sattowal
- Shehbazpura
- Shahidgarh
- Shahjahanpur
- Shahpur
- Siloani
- Sudhar
- Sukhana
- Sultan Khan Urf Mohammadpura
- Tajpur
- Talwandi Rai
- Tugal
- Tunga Heri
- Tussa
- Umarpura

== Demographics ==
As of the 2011 Indian census, Raikot had a population of 28,734. Males constituted 15,138 of the population and females 13,596. Raikot has an average literacy rate of 77%, higher than the national average of 59.5%: male literacy is 70%, and female literacy is 62%. The population is a mixture of Hindus, Sikhs(majority), Jains and Muslim and Christians.

== Geography ==
Raikot is located at 30.65°N 75.6°E. It has an average elevation of 235 metres (770 feet).

Tourist places:

1. Gurudwara Sri Tahliana Sahib: Gurdwara Sri Tahliana Sahib Raikot is the main Gurdwara in the town of Raikot and relates to Sri Guru Gobind Singh Ji.
2. Maharaja Duleep Singh Kothi Memorial: This Kothi (Mansion) is believed to have been built in 1800. This kothi has become historical when 11-year-old Maharaja Duleep Singh spend 1 night here on 31 December 1849. For many years this building was in ruin condition. In 2015, this 13-acre property, including the main Kothi, was renovated by Punjab Govt with the help of INTACH.

== See also ==
- Happy Raikoti
