= Zirakpur =

Town in Punjab, India

- Town
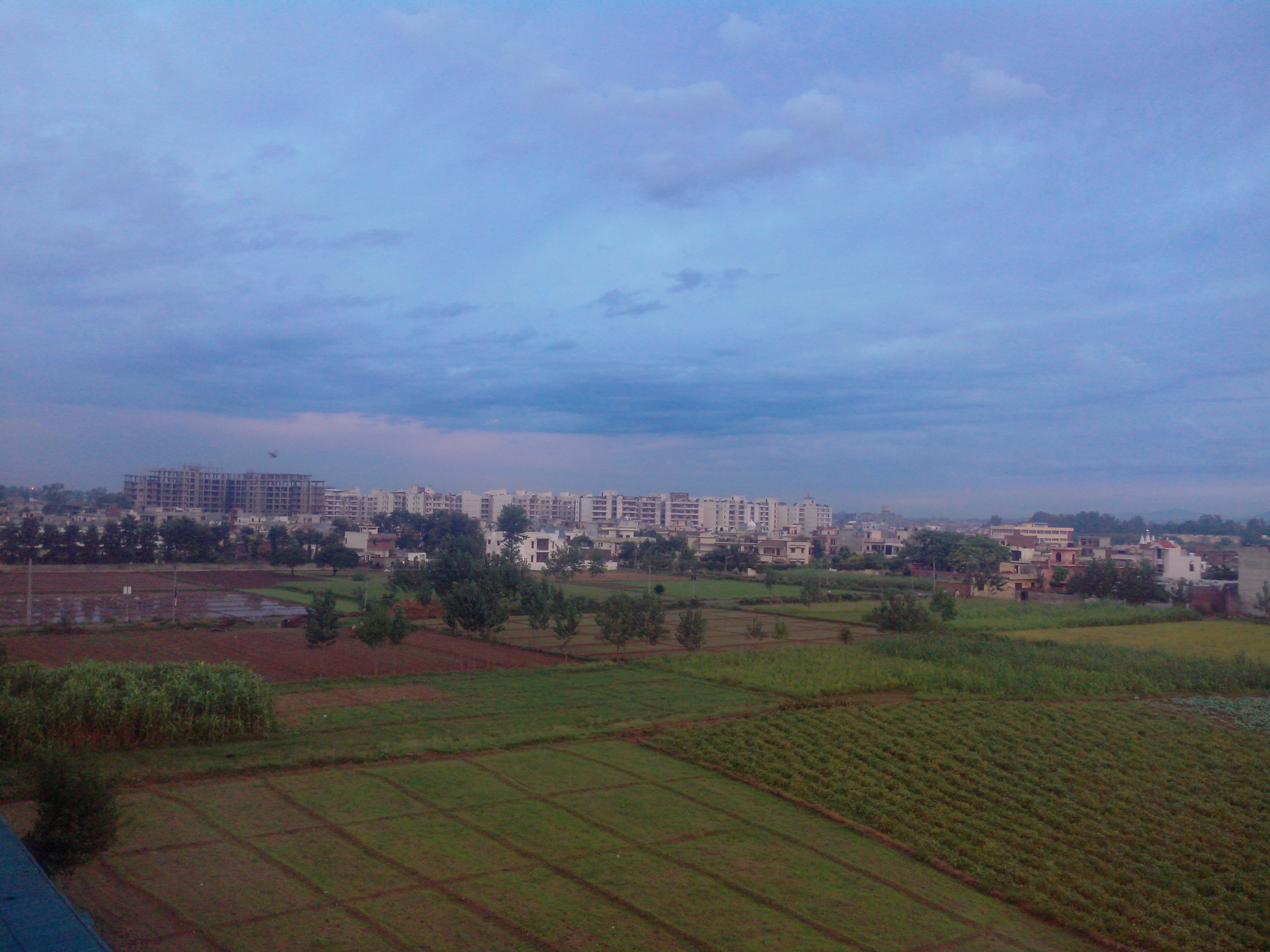

- Location in Punjab, India
- Coordinates: 30.65°N 76.82°E
- Country: India
- State: Punjab
- District: Mohali
- Elevation: 350 m (1,150 ft)

Population (2011)
  - Total: 95,553

Languages
  - Official: Punjabi
  - Native: Puadhi
- Time zone: UTC+5:30 (IST)
- PIN: 140603/140604/160104
- Telephone code: +91-1762-XXX XXX
- Vehicle registration: PB-70

Zirakpur is a town in Mohali District, Punjab, neighboring Mohali, India. It is set on the foothills of Shivalik hills. It is part of the tehsil Dera Bassi. It is the gateway to Chandigarh from Delhi. This town is situated on the junction of national highways Himalayan Expressway, National Highway 5 (India) towards Shimla, Ambala Chandigarh Expressway towards Ambala and National Highway 7 (India) towards Patiala.

== Areas nearby ==
- Dayalpura: The nearest area to the planned urban estate of Aerocity, IT city Mohali and Chandigarh International Airport. The 200 ft wide planned road through Dayalpura would connect Zirakpur directly to Besttech tower chauk in Mohali near Chandigarh border, shortening the distance of whole Zirakpur. There is a large chunk of shaamlat (Municipal council) land, where govt has planned a Govt Medical College & hospital like GMCH 32. A top-class stadium for special sportspersons, a police station, a fire station, startup incubation centre, and a big municipal park are also planned here because of the need and demand. A new high-end market with ample parking is going to come up on 82 ft wide that would connect 'High Ground Road' to Airport Road and Aerocity. The area is a leading destination in attracting real estate investments in Zirakpur. HighGround road is becoming the next VIP road.
- Chatt: The Chattbir Zoo (Mahinder Singh Zoological park) is famous all around northern India, and sees a large number of daily tourists. A lake is being planned adjacent Chattbir and Shatabgarh on the dam on river Ghaghar.

== Sectors in Zirakpur ==
Zirakpur has also been divided into 16 sectors. A sector map is yet to be put at different locations. It would be much help to people, but it would make it difficult to manipulate wards with gerrymandering during elections.

The colonies and villages falling in each sector are as under:

- Sector 1: Ravindra Enclave, Anand Vihar, Tribune Colony, Ram Leela Ground, Baltana Panchkula Road
- Sector 2: Police Station Zirakpur, Furniture Market, Sunny Enclave, Chandigarh Ambala Road
- Sector 3: Baltana Shiv Temple, Shiv Enclave, Ekta Vihar, Govind Vihar, Kalgidhar Enclave, Baltana
- Sector 4: Dikshant International School, Green City, Mamta Enclave, Lakshmi Enclave, New Generation Apartment
- Sector 5: Peer Muchalla till Old Kalka Road connecting Gazipur area
- Sector 6: Gurudwara Bouli Sahib, Dashmesh Enclave, The Hermitage Park, Vasant Vihar, Gulmohar Trend, Shri Ganesh Vihar, Jagriti Apartments
- Sector 7: Gold Mark, Both side of Kalka Road, Adarsh Nagar, AC National Public School Royal City
- Sector 8: Police Station Bishanpura, Chandigarh Enclave
- Sector 9: Best Western Maryland, Best Price, Motiaz Royal Citi, Maya Garden City, Decathlon
- Sector 10: Chandigarh Citi Center, Silver City, Nirmal Chaya
- Sector 11: Metro Mall and locality behind it
- Sector 12: Patiala Chowk
- Sector 13: Godown Area, Chandigarh-Ambala Road to Bhabat / Pabhat Village Road
- Sector 14: Swastik Vihar, Shiva Enclave, Bhabat / Pabhat Village
- Sector 15: Trishla City to Patiala Road, Highland Park, Aastha Apartments
- Sector 16: Around Gurudwara Nabha Sahib and Dayalpura

== History ==
Zirakpur got its name from a small village, which is now a part of the present Zirakpur town. For long it remained a bunch of small villages located along the Chandigarh-Ambala highway. Then Chandigarh started to expand, and these villages started to seem like a part of Chandigarh. Before the year 2000, the city had a population of less than twenty thousand. Soon a small village Baltana, which is a part of Zirakpur now, started having some population growth being near Panchkula and Chandigarh. The upcoming 5500-acre GMADA Aerotropolis project near Dayalpura has increased the interest of investors in the region.

== Public transport and traffic ==
Zirakpur is well connected through air-conditioned and non-air-conditioned local buses with Chandigarh, Panchkula and other neighbouring areas. The inter-state buses going from Chandigarh to Delhi, Patiala, Rajpura, Bathinda and most of the northern cities of Haryana pass through Zirakpur. Zirakpur is located on the Ambala-Chandigarh highway and the Patiala-Shimla highway. The nearest railway station is Chandigarh, which is around 7 km from Zirakpur. The nearest airport is situated in Chandigarh at around 5 km from Zirakpur.

The Municipal authorities in Zirakpur have been under sharp criticism from the various resident associations of the area for not maintaining the roads and thereby leading to dangerous situations for the people commuting.

The process to divide Zirakpur into various sectors like Chandigarh has been initiated, as per the latest Municipal Council meeting. There has been a demand to name Zirakpur as "South Chandigarh", and sectors numbers starting from 201 onwards. This would give unique sector numbers to the whole Tricity, with Panchkula sector numbers starting from 301 and Mullanpur sector numbers starting from 401, thus making addresses short and removing confusion arising from the same sector numbers in adjoining towns.

== Sports ==
There is an SAI (Sports Authority of India) regional center near Nabha Sahib. Upon completion it will cater to Himachal Pradesh, Jammu and Kashmir, Chandigarh and Punjab. The SAI center is spread across 15 acres and will have a football field, gymnasium hall, administrative block, indoor sports facilities and a six-lane athletics track. A big Sports Authority of India stadium for disabled people is also coming up in Dayalpura and many private sports academies are also available for various sports activities.

== Demographics ==
The Zirakpur Municipal Council has a population of 95,553 of which 50,497 are males while 45,056 are females as per a report released by Census India 2011. The population of children ages 0–6 is 12074 which is 12.64% of the total population of Zirakpur (M Cl). In Zirakpur Municipal Council, the female sex ratio is 892 against the state average of 895. Moreover, the child sex ratio in Zirakpur is around 855 compared to the Punjab state average of 846. The literacy rate of Zirakpur city is 88% higher than the state average of 75.84%. In Zirakpur, male literacy is around 91% while the female literacy rate is 85%.

=== Languages ===
Languages spoken in Zirakpur City (2011)
1. Punjabi 58.12 (56.0%)
2. Hindi 41.42 (39.9%)
3. Bhojpuri 0.77 (0.74%)
4. Pahari 0.73 (0.70%)
5. Haryanvi 0.6 (0.58%)
6. Bengali 0.4 (0.39%)
7. Others 1.79 (1.72%)

== Politics ==
The town is organized into 31 wards which constitute the municipal council.

Nº	Ward No	Name of municipal Councillor
	Sh. Udayvir Singh Dhillon(President)	
	16	Narmial Singh
	18	Tejinder Singh (Teji)

== Gallery ==
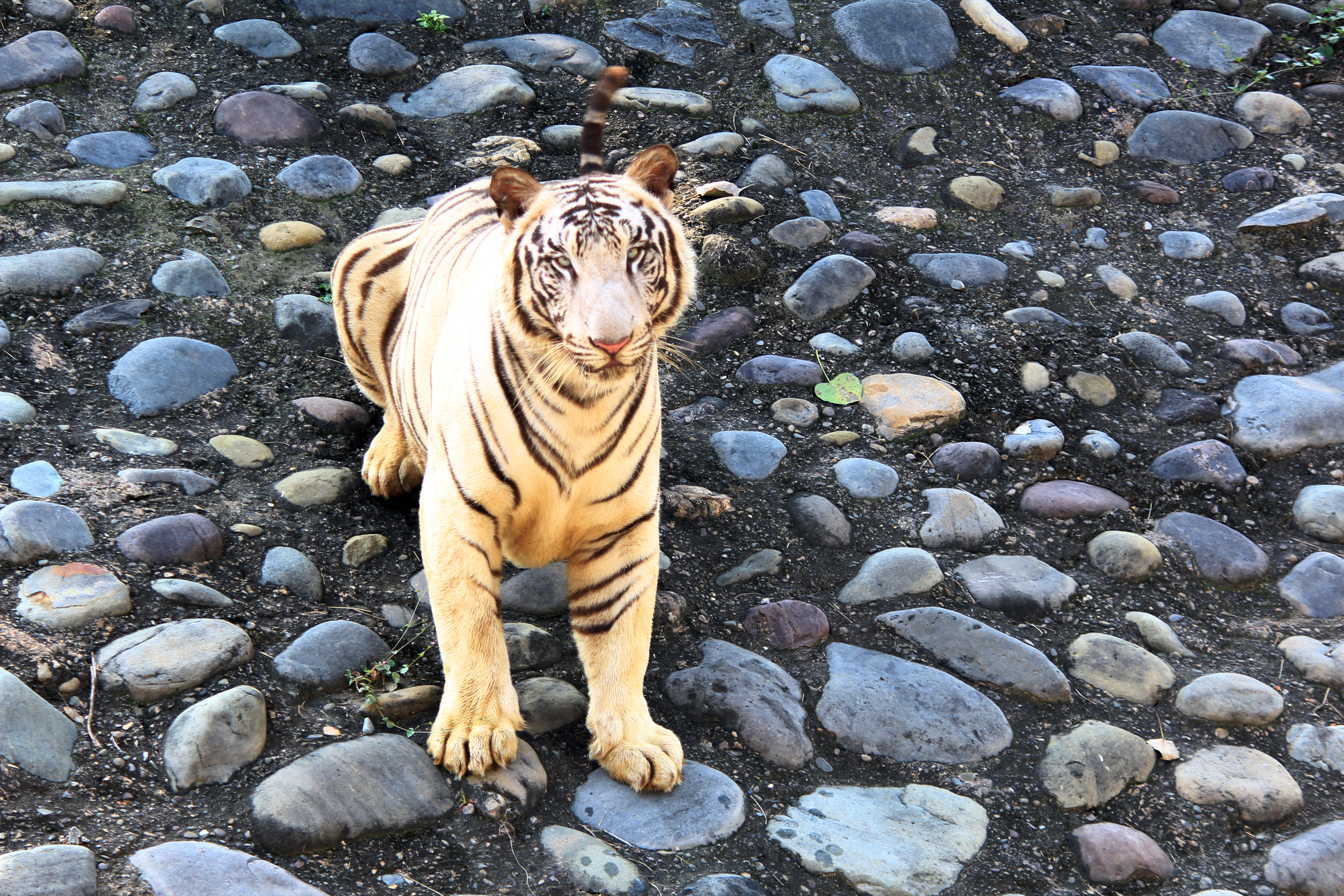
A white Bengal tiger at Chhatbir Zoo, Zirakpur

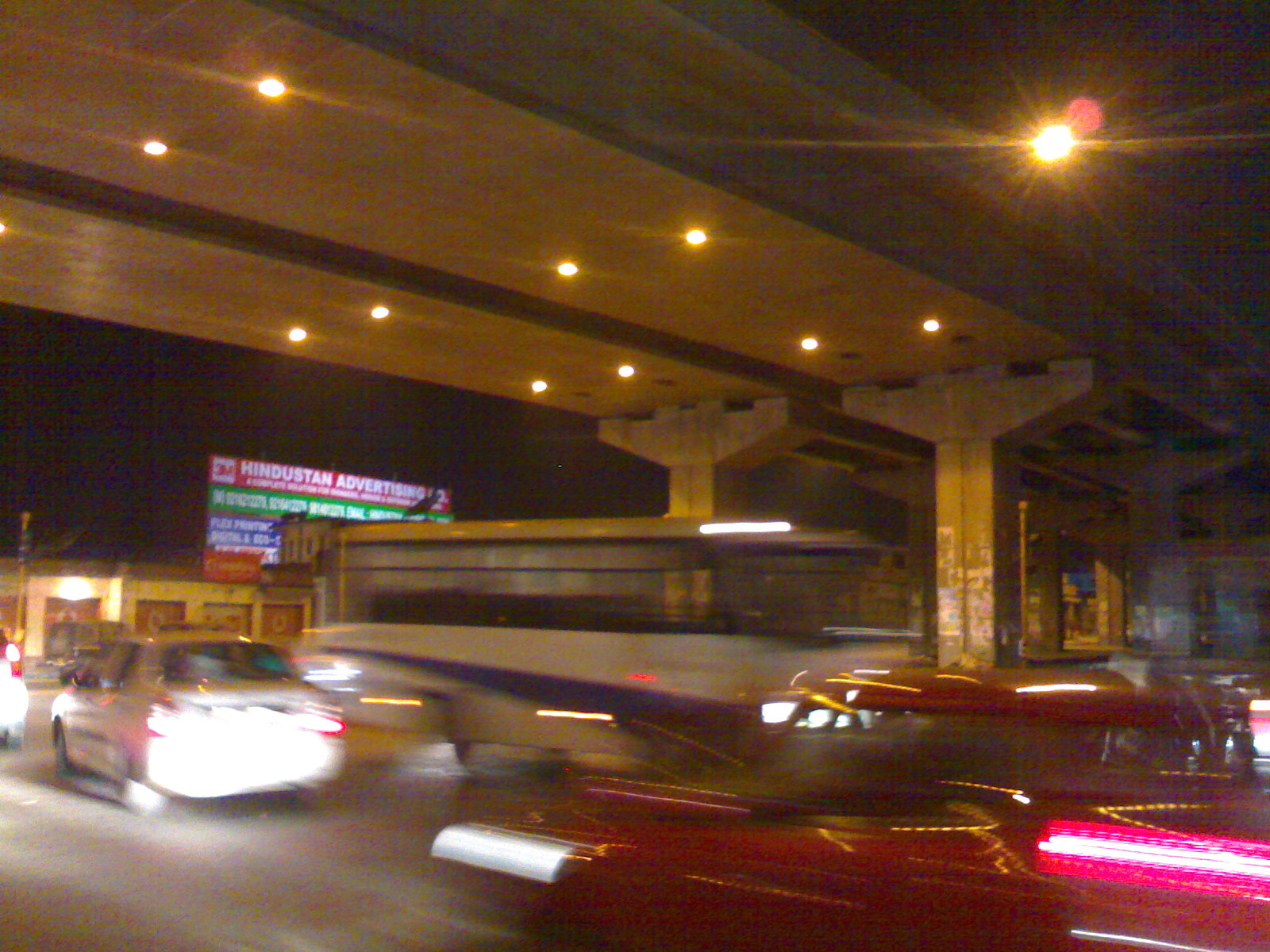
Flyover Zirakpur at night

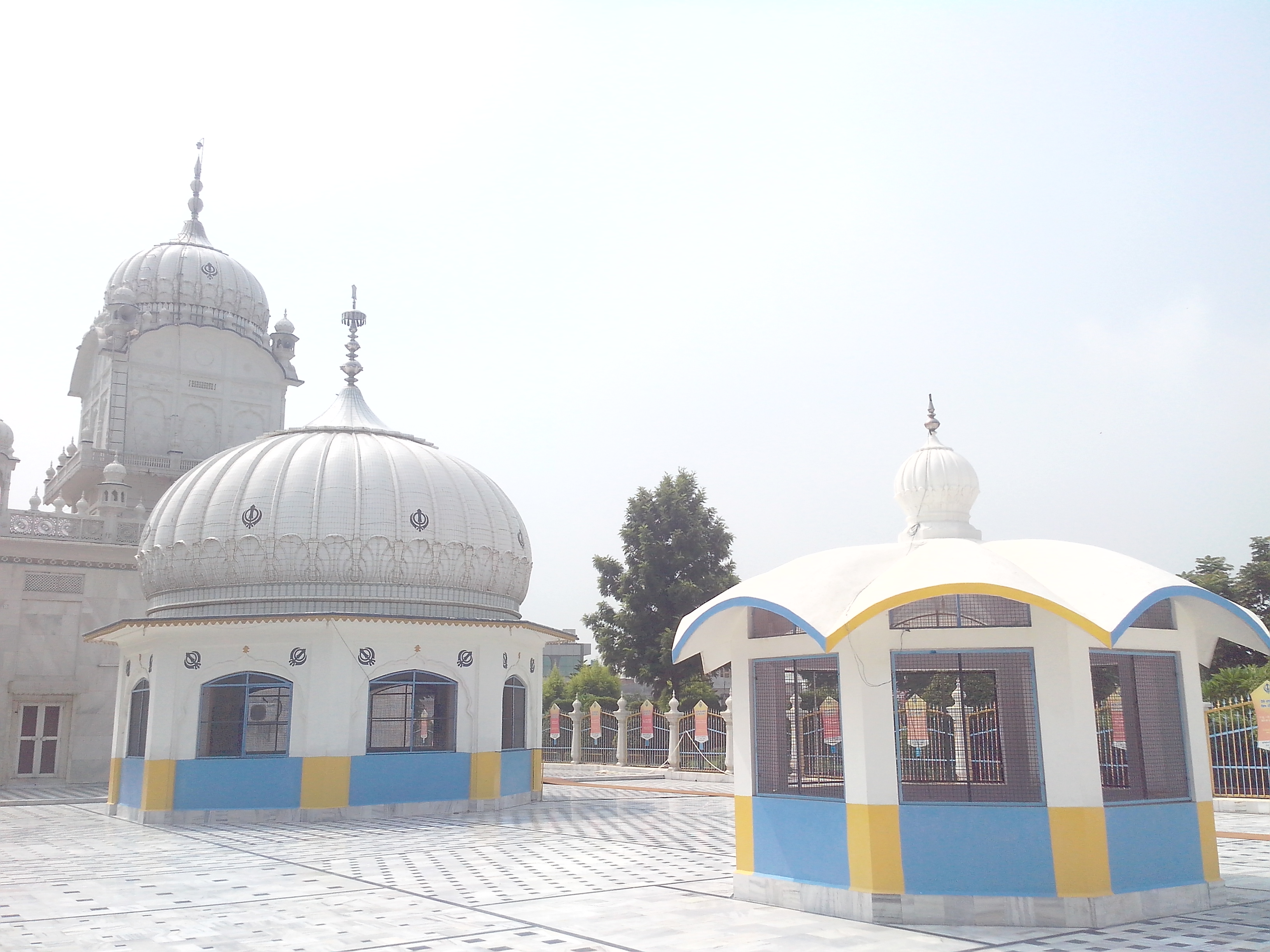
Gurudwara Baoli Saheb Patshahi 10th, Dhakoli, Zirakpur
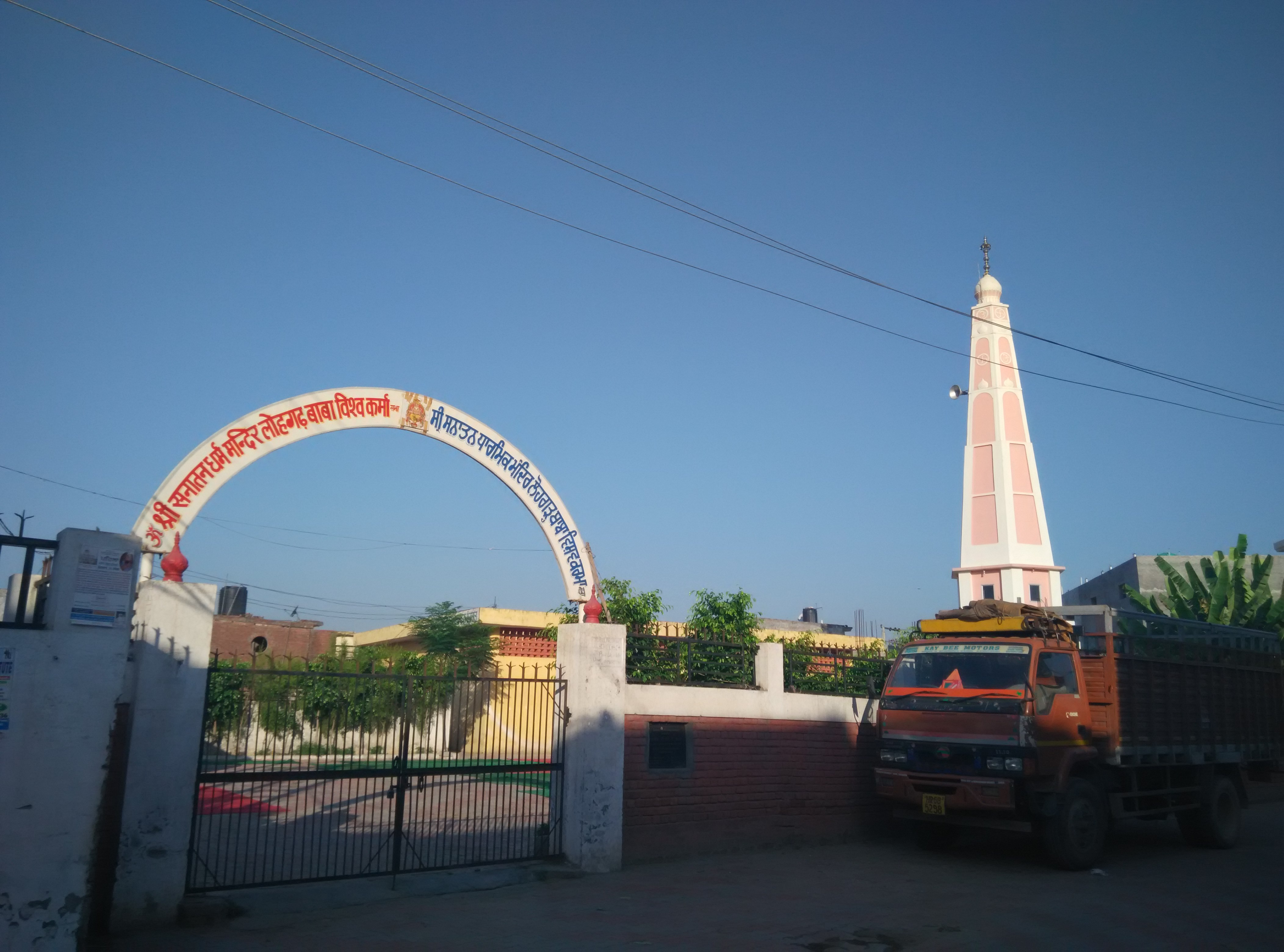
Vishwakarma Temple, Zirakpur

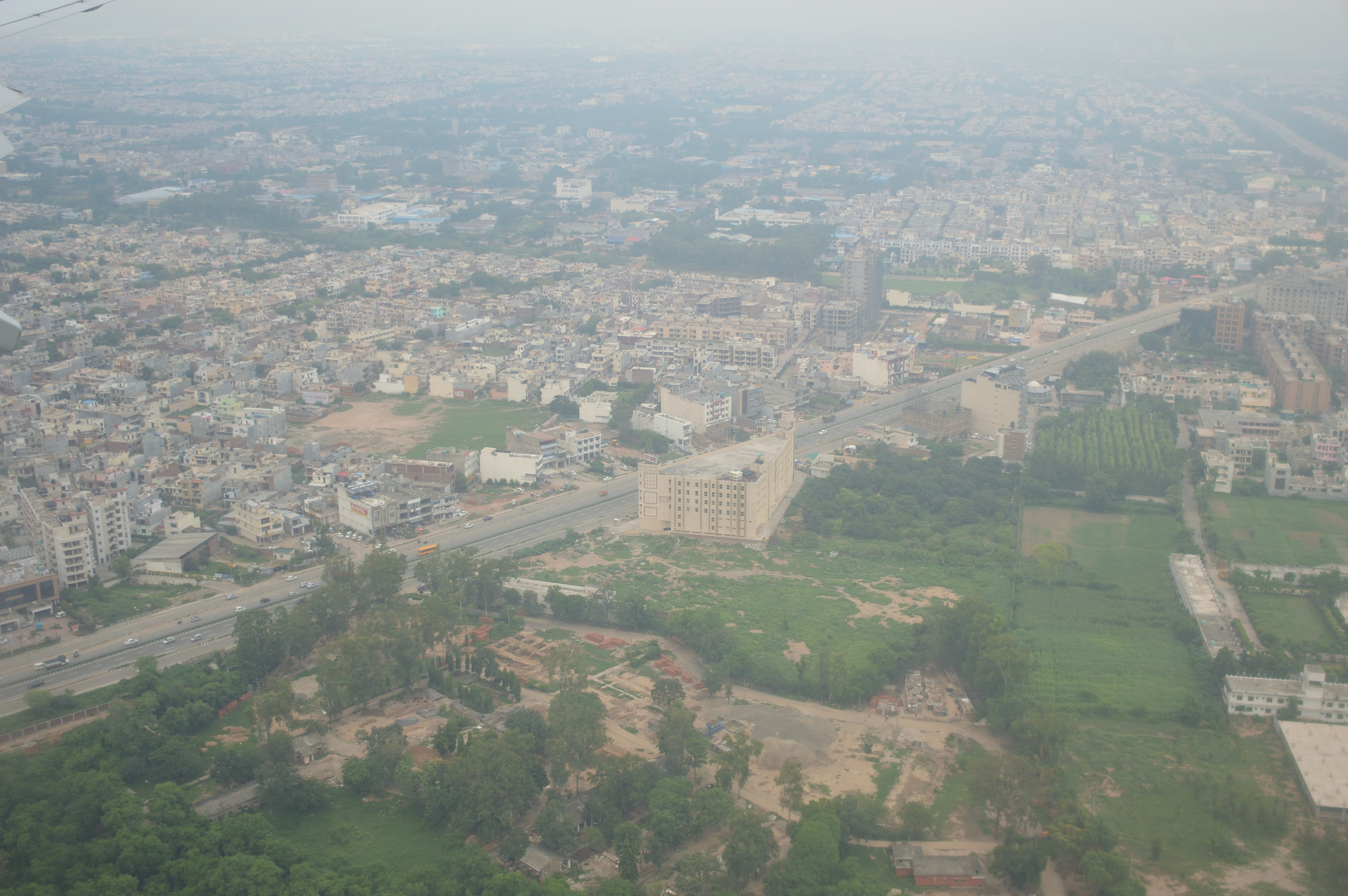
Baltana - Zirakpur-Panchkula-Kalka Highway

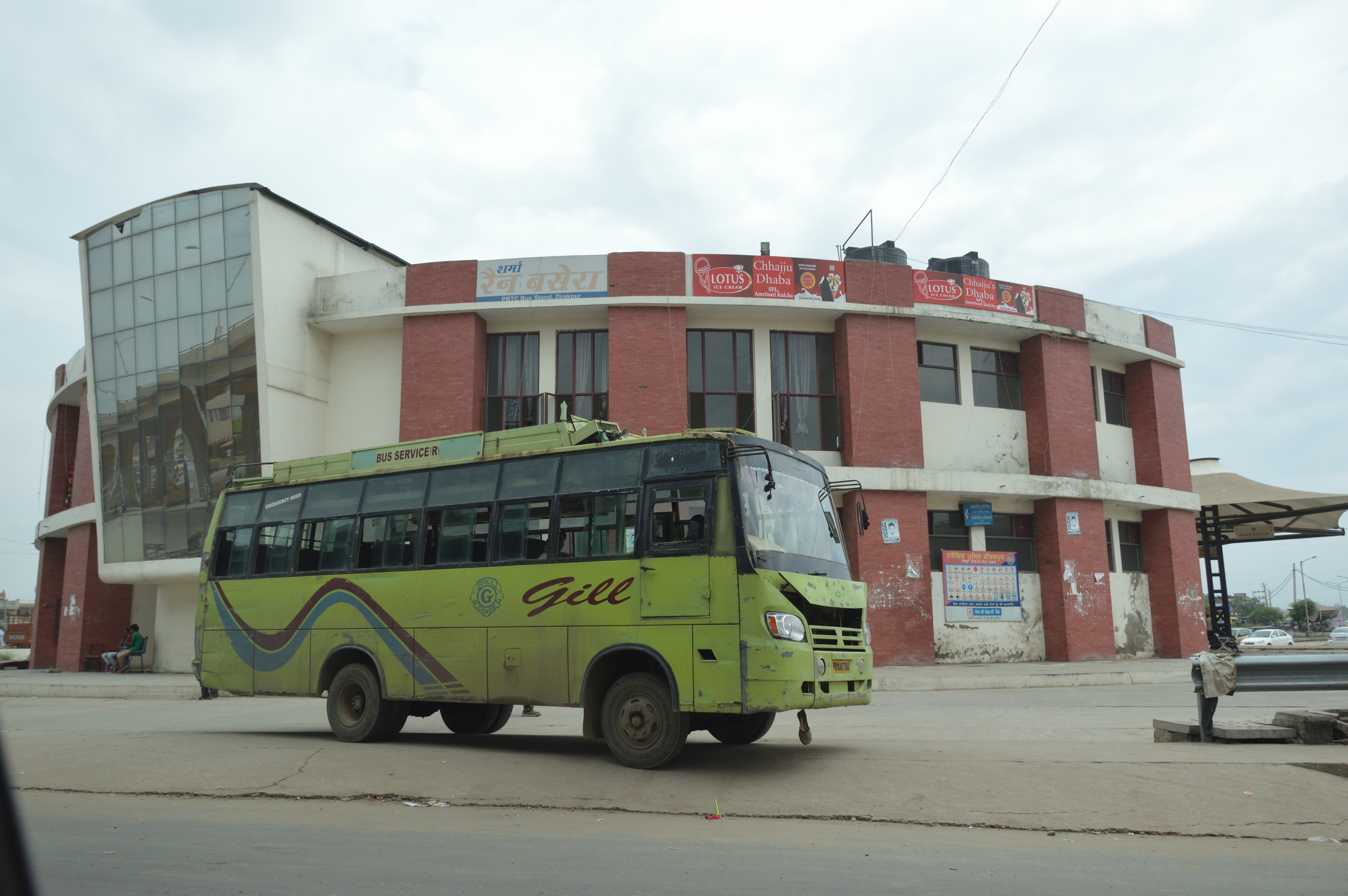
PRTC Bus Terminus - Zirakpur

== See also ==
- Greater Mohali
