= D. P. Singh =

D. P. Singh may refer to:

- D. P. Singh (runner), Indian Army officer and blade runner
- D. P. Singh (writer), Indo-Canadian scientist and science fiction writer
- D. P. Singh (administrator), Indian academic administrator
