= Nishtha Dudeja =

Indian model

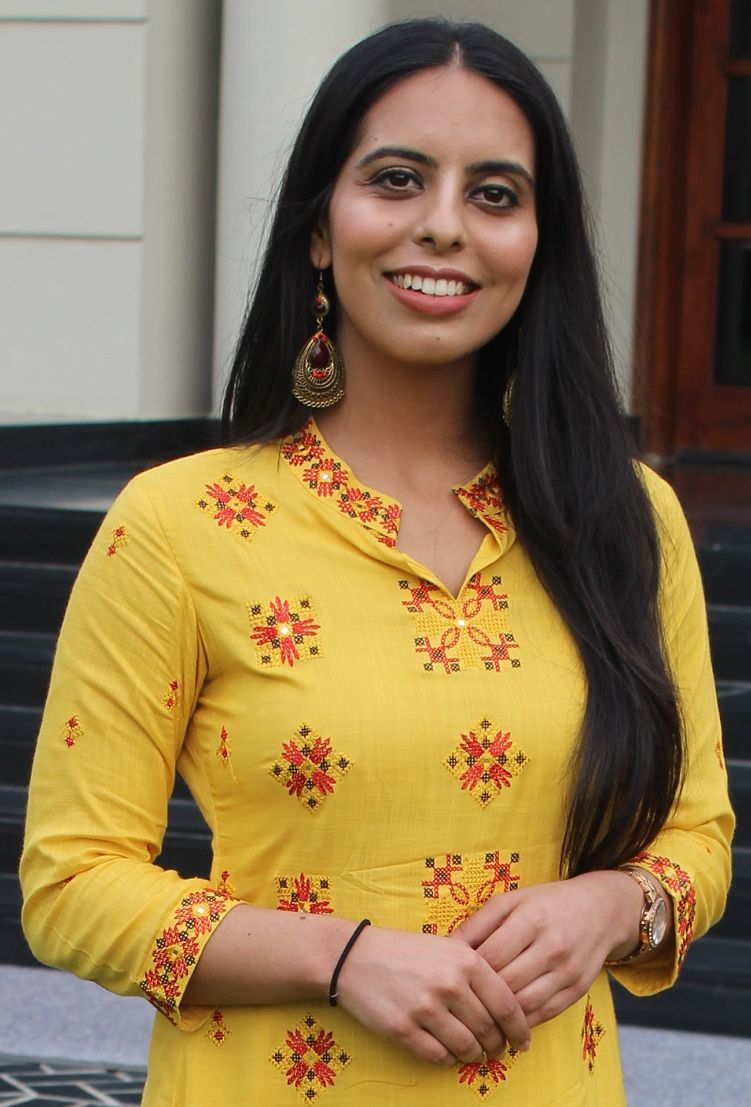
- Nishtha Dudeja, 2018
- Born: 29 August 1995 (age 31); Ghaziabad, India
- Education: Sri Venkateswara College, Delhi University Mithibai College, Mumbai University
- Occupations: Model; beauty pageant titleholder
- Beauty pageant titleholder
- Title: Miss Deaf India 2018, Miss Deaf Asia 2018
- Major competition: Miss Deaf India 2018, Miss Deaf Asia 2018

Nishtha Dudeja (born 29 August 1995) is an Indian model and the winner of the Miss Deaf Asia 2018 title. She represented the state of Delhi at the AIDACS Miss and Mister Deaf India pageant in which she won. Dudeja is the first representative from India to win any title at Miss and Mister Deaf World pageant since its inception 18 years ago.

== Early life ==
Dudeja was born on 29 August 1995 into a Punjabi family in Ghaziabad, Uttar Pradesh.

Nishtha was born with a severe to profound hearing deficiency in both the ears. However, her parents only realised it when she was 3 years old, due to lack of adequate medical facilities in Guwahati where her father was posted at that time. It was only after a BERA test was conducted on her at AIIMS, Delhi in 1998 that it was known to them about her being born with a hearing loss. She started using hearing aids and taking speech therapy lessons. On the advice of her speech therapist, she was sent to a normal school.

Nishtha stood first in Hindi and Second in English in Ambience Public School, by scoring 93% marks in both the subjects, in her 12th Board's exam. Despite having Arts background, she was offered Commerce in graduation and she completed her Bachelors of Commerce from Sri Venkateswara College of University of Delhi.

Dudeja did internship at UNESCO in Delhi after her graduation where she handled social media and other assignments to publicize the activities undertaken by UNESCO. This stint taught her how to navigate challenges faced by those with disabilities in the workplace. She was later invited by UNESCO, Delhi as a guest of honor at the celebration of International Day of Persons with Disabilities.

== Career in sports ==
Dudeja was energetic in childhood and at the age of 7, she was admitted to Judo classes by her mother. She played Judo for five years and won many medals at the state and national levels. When she was 12 years old, the Judo Centre closed and she abandoned the sport. Thereafter, inspired by Sania Mirza, Dudeja started playing tennis.

Dudeja has been an international tennis player, having represented India three times at international competitions. She participated in Deaflympics – 2013 (Sofia, Bulgaria), World Deaf Tennis Championship – 2015 (Nottingham, UK) and Deaflympics – 2017 (Samsun, Turkey).

== Pageantry ==
=== Miss Deaf India 2018 ===
Dudeja's journey in glamour world began due to severe pain in her jaw which forced her to leave tennis. She was crowned Miss Deaf India 2018 in the Miss and Mister Deaf India Pageant held in Jaipur in February, 2018 under the aegis of All India Deaf Arts and Cultural Society, making her eligible to represent India in Miss and Mister Deaf World 2018 competition.

=== Miss Deaf Asia 2018 ===
Dudeja represented India in Miss and Mister Deaf World 2018 pageant held in Prague, Czech Republic where she won the crown of Miss Deaf Asia 2018. She is the first Indian woman to have won any title in Miss and Mister Deaf World competition since 18 years of its inception in 2001.

== Awards and recognition ==
- National Award as Role Model: in recognition of her achievements in the fields of education, sports, arts and culture, Dudeja was conferred with National Award for the Empowerment of Persons with Disabilities in the category of Role Model by Vice President of India in a function held in Vigyan Bhawan on 3 December 2018.
- Talk at Lancers International School: in November 2018, the Lancers International School management felicitated Nishtha, while she also interacted with the students of Grade VI to IX, shared her experience and encouraged the students to work hard in life.
- Chief guest at the event organised by Uprise India: held at India International Centre (Delhi), Dudeja was invited to motivate and inspire budding women entrepreneurs. Dudeja addressed the Business Women Conference-2019 conference and encouraged the women entrepreneurs.
- TEDx Talk – Voice of Victory: Dudeja delivered her TEDx Talk at TEDxGLIM organised by Great Lakes Institute of Management, Gurgaon in 2019. In this talk, she shared the journey of her life with the audience. She spoke about development of her speech through speech therapy. She also talked about Judo, Tennis, education and beauty pageants.
- Brand Ambassador, Sivantos India Pvt Ltd: Dudeja is the brand ambassador of Sivantos India Private Limited (Formerly Siemens Hearing Instruments Pvt. Ltd.), a part of the Sivantos Group, which is one of the world's top manufacturers of hearing aids.
