= Akbar Khan (disability activist) =

Indian activist and musician

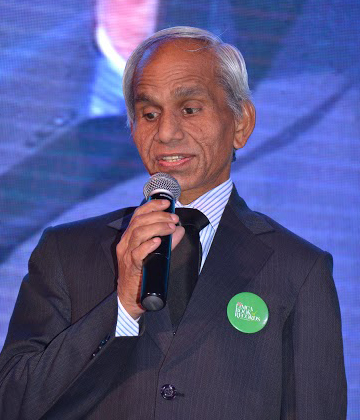
- Khan in 2016
- Born: 16 August 1962 (age 64); Bangasar, Rajasthan, India
- Education: DAV School, Ajmer; Blind School, Ajmer; Sanatan Dharm Govt. College, Beawar; Savitri Girls College, Ajmer
- Occupations: Singer-songwriter; musician; composer; activist; banker
- Years active: 1975–present
- Employer: Punjab National Bank
- Spouse: Rana Ruknuddin (m. 1987)
- Children: 2
- Parents: Kistoor Khan (father); Rahmat Begum (mother)
- Awards: National Award (1989)
- Honours: People of the Year (2016)

Akbar Khan (born 16 August 1962) is an Indian disability rights activist, singer and former bank employee. He received India's National Award for the Welfare of Persons with Disabilities in 1989 and was named among the Limca Book of Records People of the Year in 2016.

== Early life and education ==
Akbar Khan was born on 16 August 1962 to a Muslim family in Bangasar, Rajasthan. His father, Kistoor Khan, was a farmer and his mother, Rahmat Begum, a housewife. He was born with Leber's congenital amaurosis, a rare inherited eye disease. He had two brothers who were born with the same condition; one of them died in early childhood.

Khan's secondary education was at Govt. Blind School, Ajmer and DAV School, Ajmer. In 1978, at the age of 16, Khan was selected by Government of India under the National Scholarship Scheme for securing high position in the list of meritorious candidates qualifying for award in Rajasthan state. He attended Sanatan Dharm Govt. College, Beawar and Savitri Girls College, Ajmer. He graduated in 1982, with Sanskrit, Sociology and Indian vocal music.

== Career ==
Khan was the first visually impaired candidate in India to qualify in the Staff Selection Commission (SSC) of India and the first blind person to join Punjab National Bank as steno-typist in Punjab region. In 1989, at the age of 27, the Government of India gave him the National Award for persons with disabilities in the category of best employee with a disability.

Khan is a singer, musician and composer. He placed first in a vocal and classical music competition in 1987 and has served as a judge at an all-India music competition.

Khan has been active with the National Federation of the Blind (NFB) in Bikaner division, working for the welfare of visually impaired people.

== Awards and honors ==
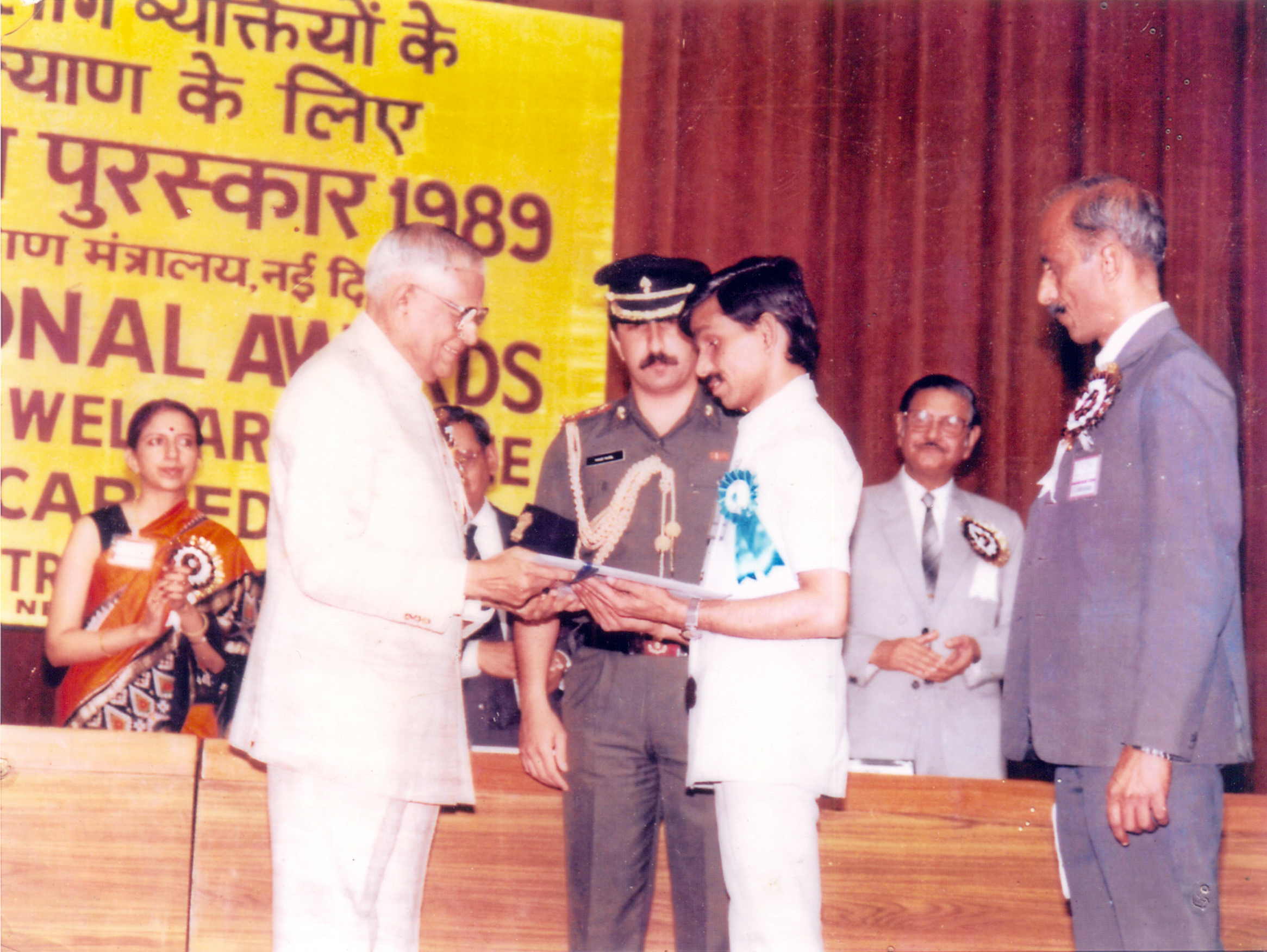
Akbar Khan receiving the National Award from President of India Ramaswamy Venkataraman in 1989

- 1988 – Best Employee Award by Governor of Punjab, Punjab, India.
- 1989 – National Award by the Government of India at Vigyan Bhawan, Delhi, India.
- 1999 – Gold Medal by the Governor of Gujarat, Gujarat, India
- 2012 – Pride of Rajasthan by the Education Minister of the Government of Rajasthan, Rajasthan, India.
- 2016 – People of the Year by Limca Book of Records at India Habitat Centre, Delhi, India.

== Family and personal life ==
Khan is married to Rana Ruknuddin, who holds a PhD from Aligarh Muslim University.
