= D. P. Singh (runner) =

Indian army officer and marathon runner (born 1973)

Major Devender Pal Singh
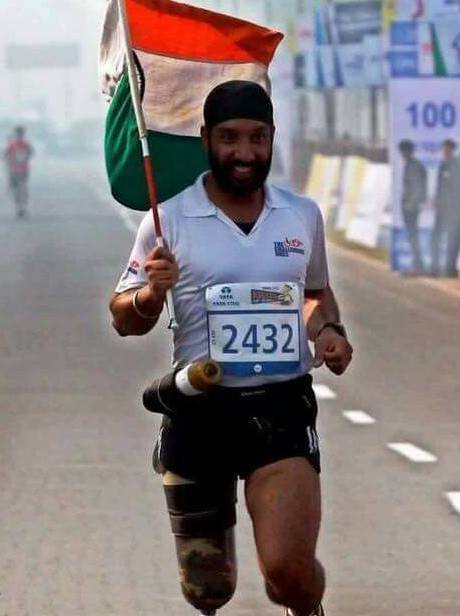
- Born: September 1973; Jagadhari, India
- Education: Indian Military Academy
- Military career
- Allegiance: India
- Branch: Indian Army
- Service years: 1997–2007
- Conflicts: Kargil War; Operation Vijay; LOC in Akhnoor sector

Major D.P. Singh is a retired officer of the Indian Army. He is a Kargil War veteran and is known as India's first blade runner. After his amputation, he gradually started running using a prosthetic limb and has run in 26 half-marathons in his running career. This includes three half-marathons in extreme high altitude as high as 11,700 ft (3,600 m) in Leh. The Limca Book of Records added his name to their "People of the Year 2016" list. In 2018, Govt of India, Ministry of social justice and empowerment conferred him with National award for persons with disabilities under Role model category. In 2019 he was conferred with coveted civilian award, CavinKare Ability Mastery award in recognition of excellence achieved against all odds. He was taken as Ambassador by Indian army for year 2018, which was the year dedicated to soldiers who got disabled in line of duty.

In 2019, he wrote another chapter in history when he became the 1st solo Skydiver among persons with disabilities in whole Asia.

His life story was chronicled in Grit: The Major Story, a 2019 graphic memoir Singh coauthored with V.R. Ferose and Sriram Jagannathan.

== Early life and career ==
Major Devender Pal Singh was born on 13 January 1974 in Jagadhri, India, though his official records list 13 September 1973. During the 1999 Kargil War, he suffered severe injuries and was initially declared dead upon arrival at the hospital. Consequently, he considers 15 July 1999 his "Death and Rebirth Day." Embracing this second chance at life, he celebrates all three dates, marking 15 July by writing "Death and Rebirth Day" on his birthday cake. He received his senior secondary education from Kendriya Vidyalaya Roorkee. He did his Bachelor of Arts degree from CCU Meerut.

Major Singh graduated from the Indian Military Academy (101st course, Regular batch) on 6 December 1997 and was commissioned into the 7th Battalion, The Dogra Regiment. After the injury, in 2002, he converted to Army Ordnance Corps. He retired from the Indian Army in 2007, after serving for 10 years.

== Kargil War ==
Major D.P. Singh was injured on 15 July 1999 at LOC in Akhnoor sector while fighting for India during the Kargil War (Operation Vijay).

He was 80 meters from a Pakistani Army post when a mortar fell within 1.5 metres (4 ft 11 in) of where he was; the shrapnel injured multiple parts of his body. A part of his right leg was amputated as it had developed gangrene. His war injuries and its side effects has made him a man with multiple following disabilities making him more than 100% disabled: 1. Amputation right leg (through the knee, a rare and difficult amputation due to which prosthesis fitment becomes a challenge) amputation. (WAR Injury) 2. Bilateral high frequency hearing loss (Blast acoustic trauma) (WAR Injury) 3. Partial removal of intestines (WAR Injury) 4. 73 shrapnel (cast iron bomb particles, 1 mm to 1 inch) embedded in various body parts/joints/bones, all over the body, including liver. (WAR Injury) 5. Urinary bladder operated for cystitis cystica glandularis (https://en.wikipedia.org/wiki/Cystitis_glandularis) (Side effect of WAR Injuries) 6. Cervical spondylosis (C5, C6 and C7 affected) (Side effect of WAR Injuries) 7. Left knee operated for meniscus and ligament tear (martial art injury) 8. Eyes nerve impacted leading to presbyopia (side effect of WAR injuries) 9. PTSD (post traumatic stress disorder) (WAR Impact) 10. Latest found is Parkinson's disease (right brain impacted leading to bradykinesia and tremor in left side limbs) (Side effect of WAR injuries)
