= Yudhajeet De =

Indian blind chess player

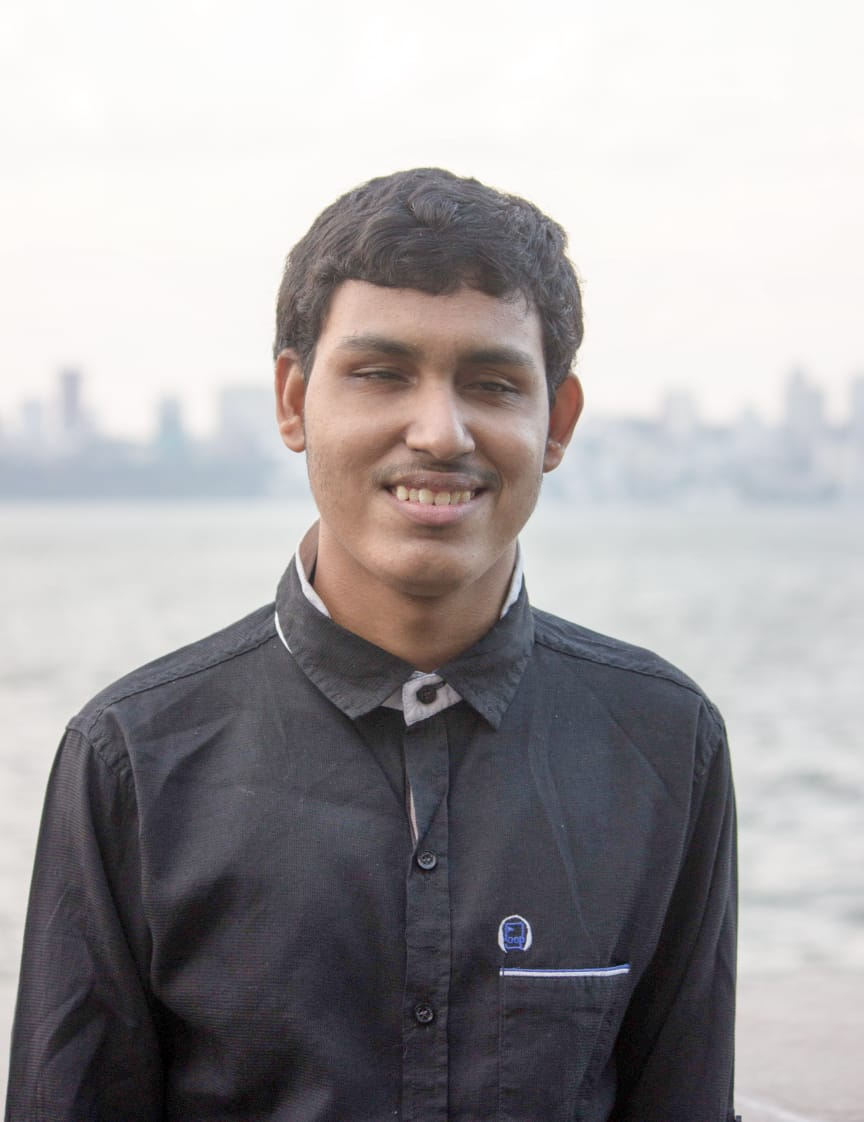
- Indian blind chess player Yudhajeet De

Personal information
- Full name: Yudhajeet De
- Born: 1996 (age 29–30) Uttarpara, Hooghly, West Bengal, India

Chess career
- Country: India

Yudhajeet De is an Indian blind chess player, coach, and chess organiser from Uttarpara, West Bengal. He is a recipient of the National Award for the Empowerment of Persons with Disabilities (2025), conferred by the Ministry of Social Justice and Empowerment, Government of India. He represented India at the IBCA Asian Chess Championship for the Visually Challenged in 2017, finishing with a strong 4/8 score and holding a joint lead early in the tournament.

== Early life ==
Yudhajeet De was born in 1996 in Uttarpara, Hooghly district, West Bengal, India, to Arup Kumar De and Ruma De. He is visually impaired and developed an interest in chess at the age of six under his mother's guidance. He has a twin brother, Deeptyajeet De, who is also blind; Deeptyajeet learned chess from Yudhajeet and went on to become an internationally FIDE-rated player. In addition to chess, Yudhajeet completed an eight-year course in sitar with distinction, receiving the Best Creative Child award from the Governor of West Bengal in 2011.

== Chess career ==
De has competed in National and International chess tournaments for visually impaired players. He represented India in Asian Blind Chess Championships organised under the International Braille Chess Association (IBCA).

== Coaching and organising ==
De acts as a professional chess coach, training both sighted and visually impaired players across India. He is associated with the Bally Chess Academy, where he provides training to young sighted boys and girls, and also conducts online coaching classes.

In July 2025, De independently organised an open chess tournament in Uttarpara tailored for sighted players. The tournament attracted 70 participants, including 10 FIDE-rated players.

== Awards and recognition ==
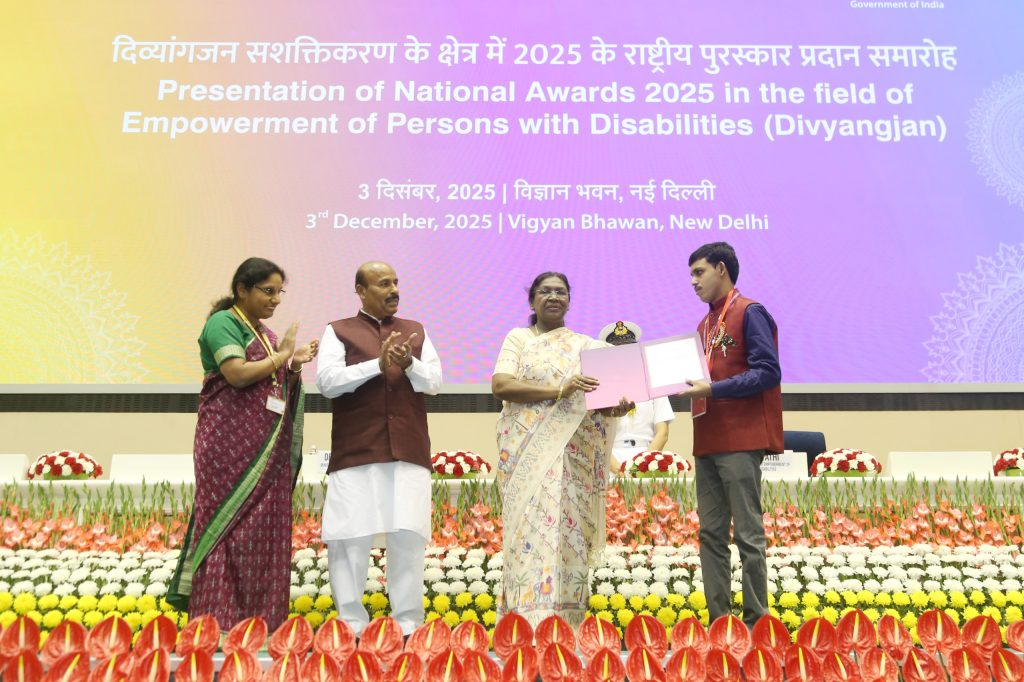
Yudhajeet De receiving the National Award for the Empowerment of Persons with Disabilities from the President of India, 2025.

- National Award for the Empowerment of Persons with Disabilities (2025), Government of India.
