= Bangasar =

- village
- Location in Rajasthan, India Bangasar (India)
- Coordinates: 29.125773°N 74.189858°E
- Country: India
- State: Rajasthan
- District: Hanumangarh

Population (2001)
  - Total: 1,107

Languages
  - Official: Hindi
- Time zone: UTC+5:30 (IST)
- ISO 3166 code: RJ-IN
- Vehicle registration: RJ-
- Nearest city: Rawatsar

Bangasar is a village in Rawatsar tehsil of Hanumangarh district in Rajasthan, India.

== Notable people from Bangasar ==
- Akbar Khan - visually impaired Singer, Composer, Writer and a Banker honored with National Award in 1989.
