= People of the Year =

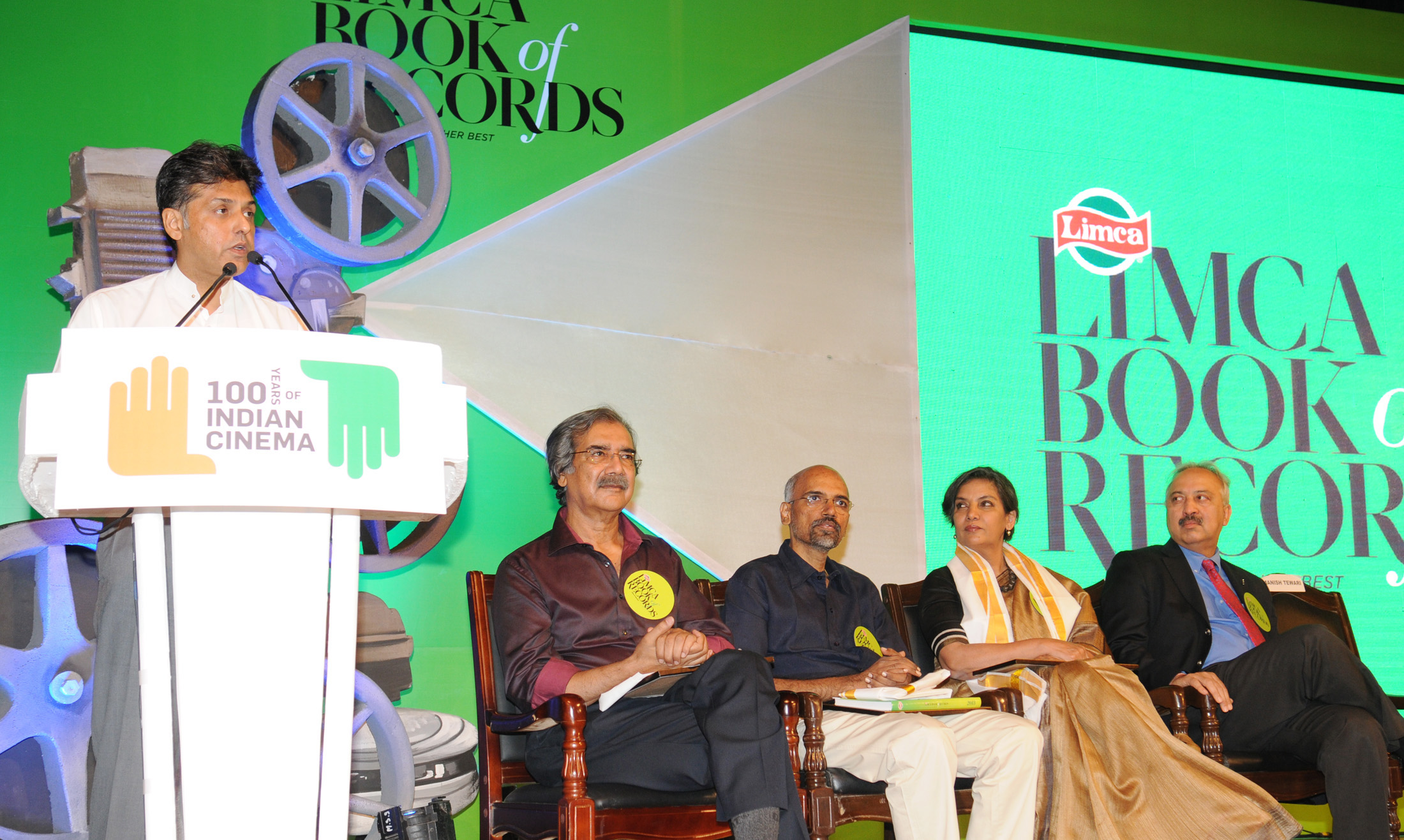
- The Minister of State (Independent Charge) for Information & Broadcasting, Shri Manish Tewari delivering the key note address, at the launch of the Limca Book of Records 2013-Cinema Special, in New Delhi on April 10, 2013
- Sponsored by: Coca-Cola India
- Country: India
- Presented by: Limca Book of Records
- First award: 1992; 34 years ago
- Winners: Anand Mahindra; Amitabh Bachchan; Naseeruddin Shah; Lata Mangeshkar; Mani Ratnam; Abhinav Bindra; Sachin Tendulkar; Justice J.S. Verma; Akbar Khan; Kamal Haasan; Gulzar

People of the Year is one of the most prominent awards in India. Constituted by Coca-Cola India, to honor people who have consistently contributed to 'Indian excellence'. Prominent recipients of award include Anand Mahindra, Amitabh Bachchan, Naseeruddin Shah, Lata Mangeshkar, Mani Ratnam, Abhinav Bindra, Sachin Tendulkar, Justice J.S. Verma, Akbar Khan, Kamal Haasan and Gulzar.

== Selection ==
A panel of judges selects people who have consistently contributed to Indian excellence.

== List of recipients ==
=== 2009 ===
Image	Choice	State/Country	Notes	Ref.
	Amitabh Bachchan	India		
	G. Madhavan Nair	India		
	Raghu Rai	India		
	Rajdeep Sardesai	India		

=== 2010 ===
7 Indian personalities were chosen in year 2010.

Image	Choice	State/Country	Notes	Ref.
	Anand Mahindra	India		
	Rahul Dravid	India		
	Kiran Karnik	India		
	Anjolie Ela Menon	India		
	Justice J.S. Verma	India		
	Lalitha Regi	India		

=== 2012 ===
Gulzar, Asha Bhosle, Yesudas.

=== 2013 ===
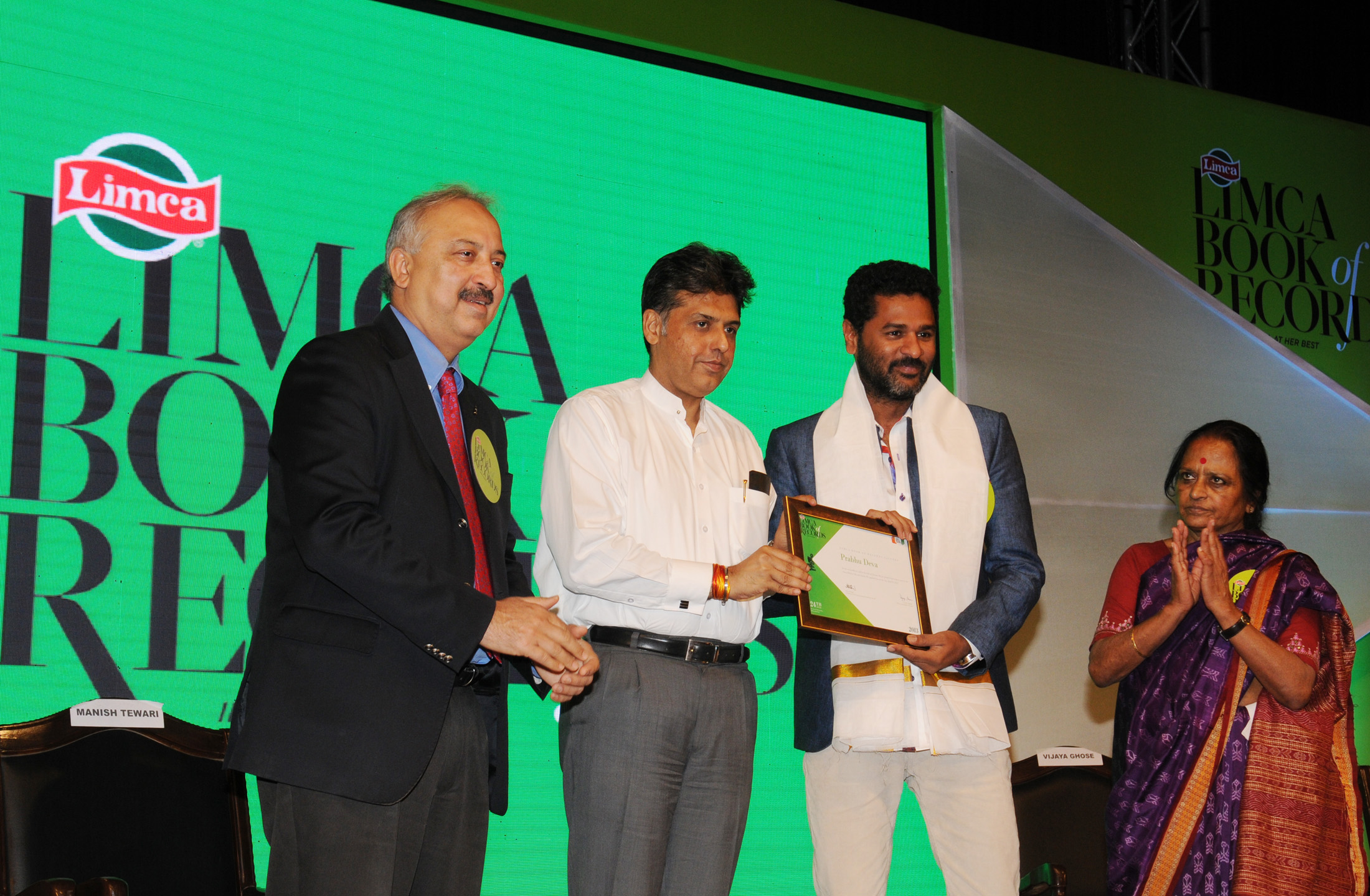
Prabhu Deva receiving the award

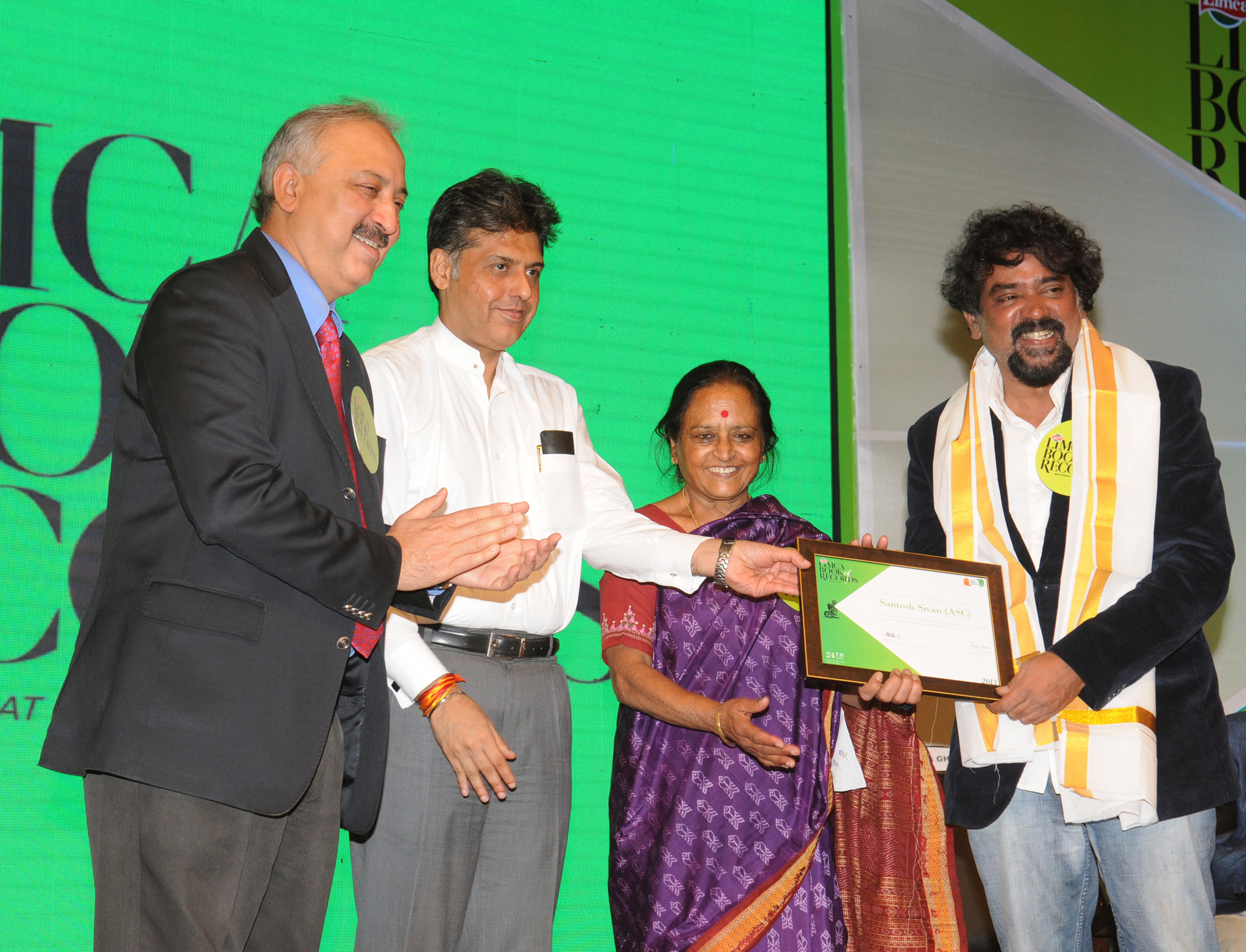
Santosh Sivan receiving the award

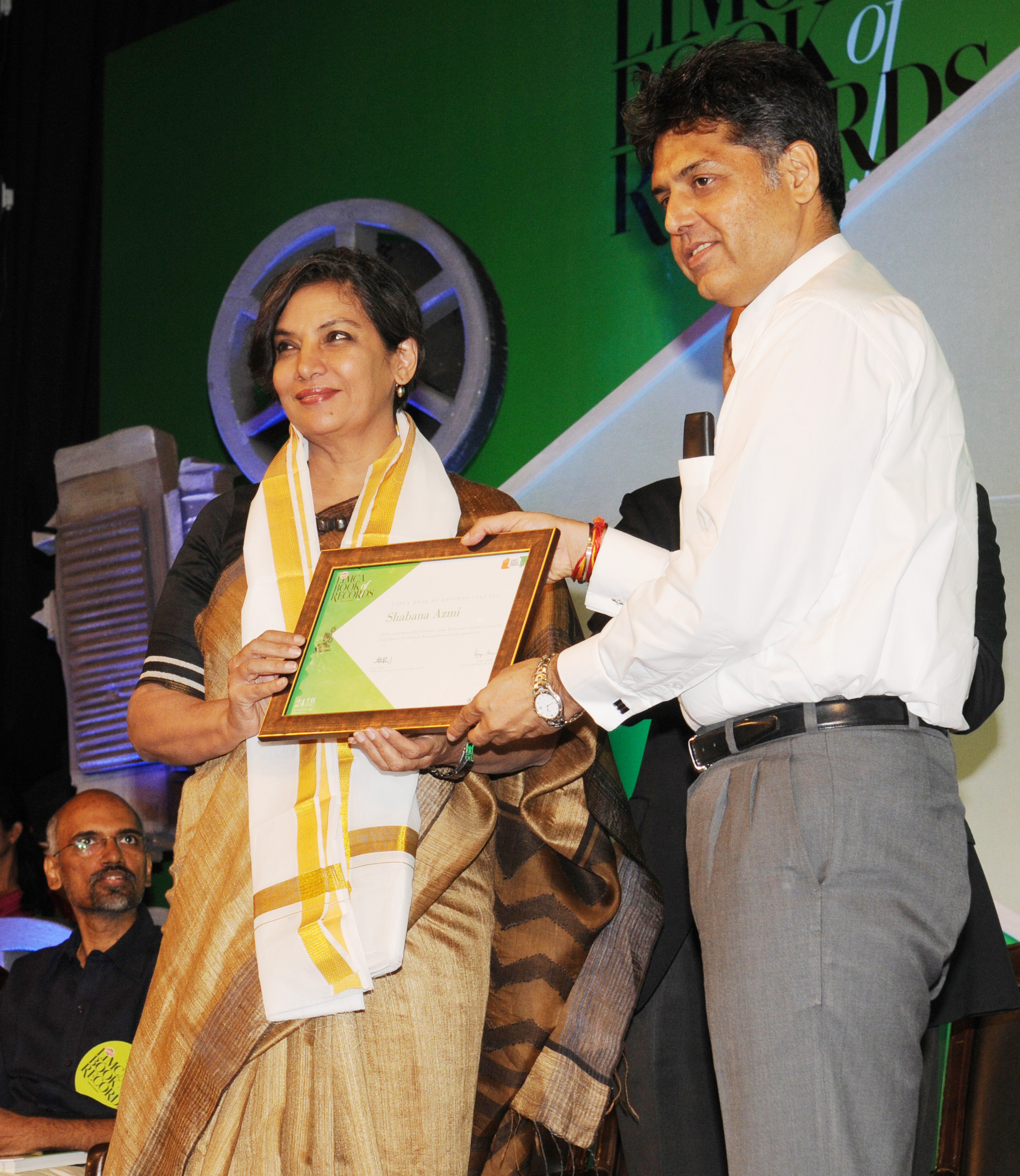
Shabana Azmi receiving the award

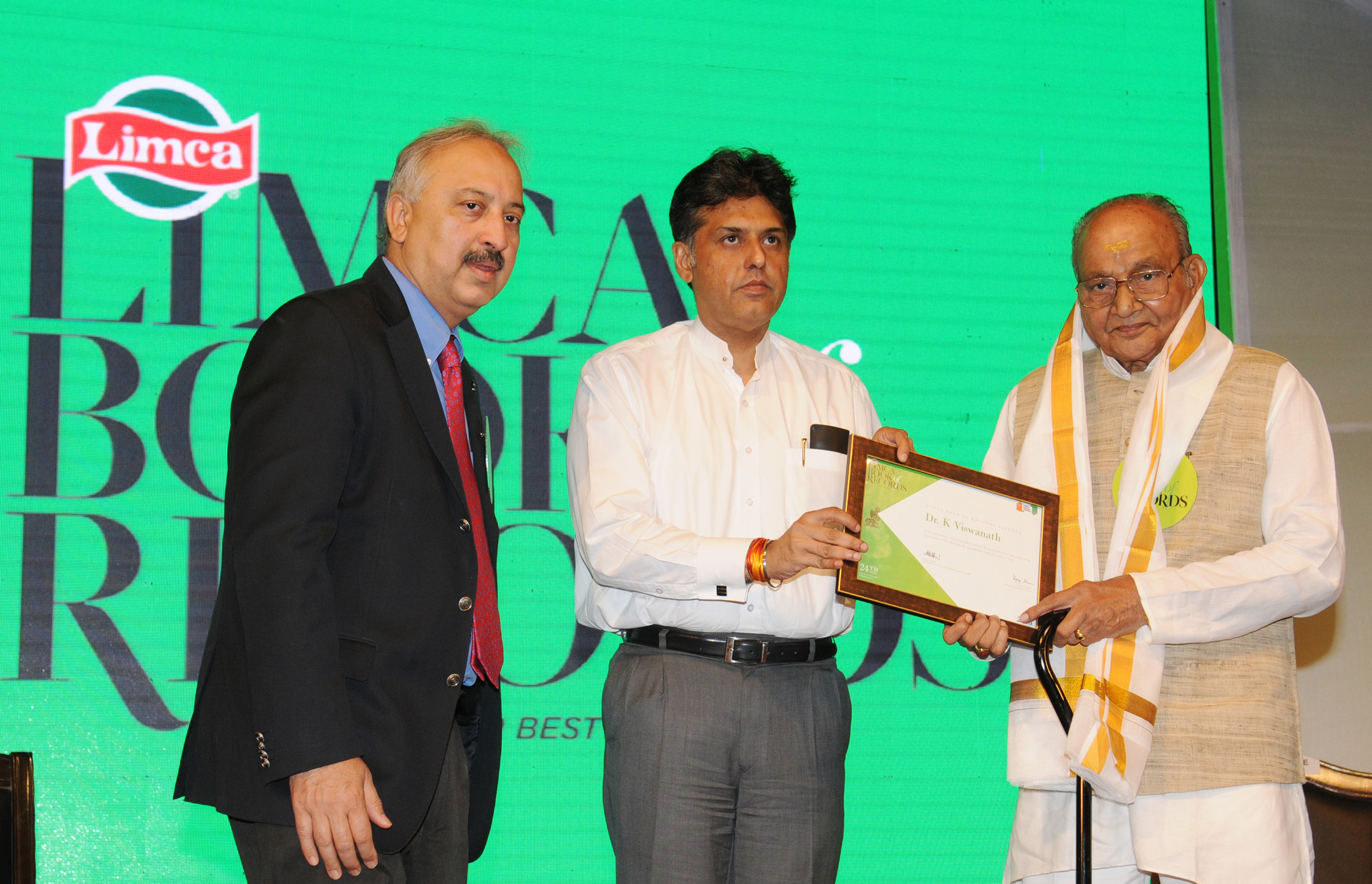
Dr. K Vishwanath receiving the award

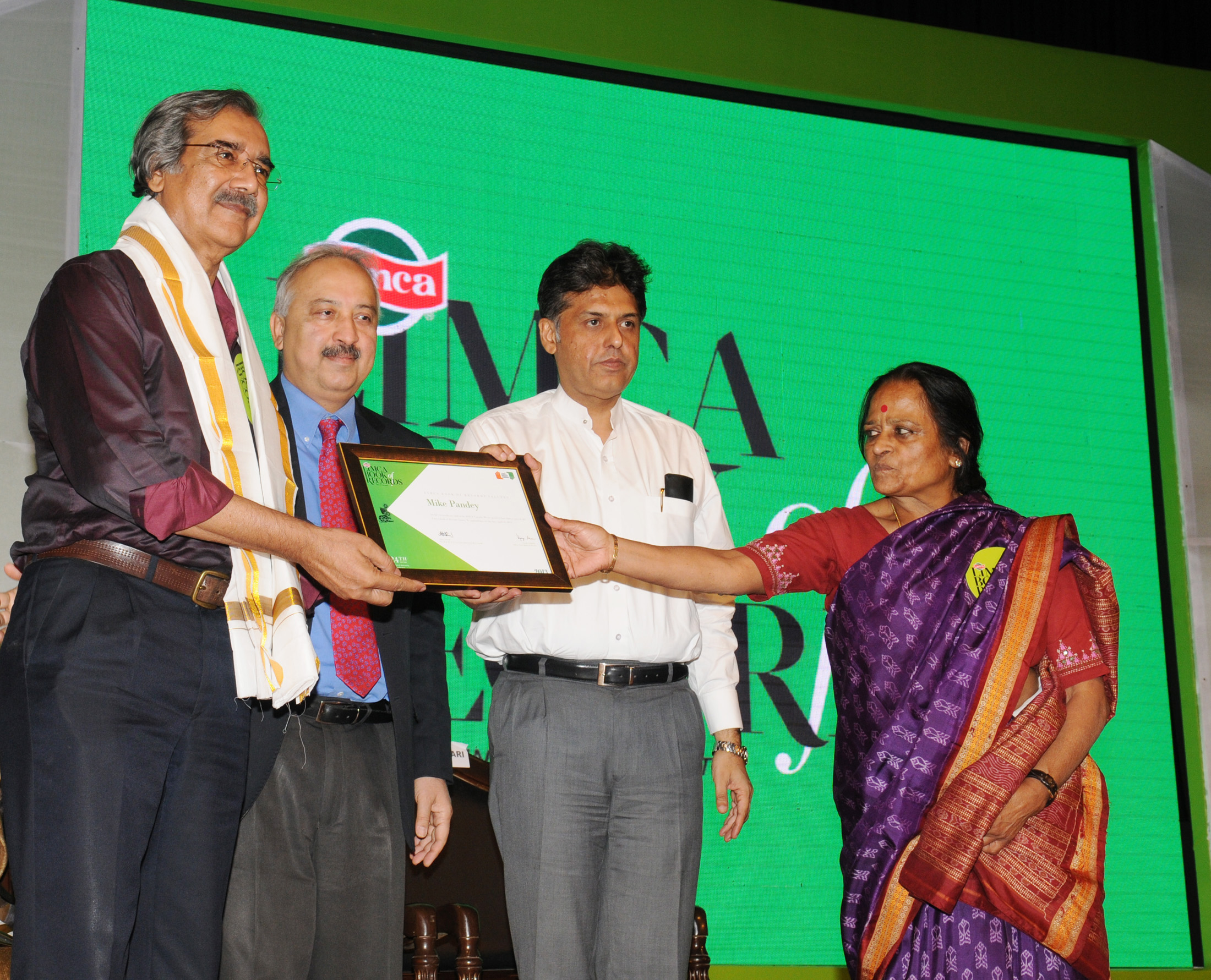
Mike Pandey receiving the award

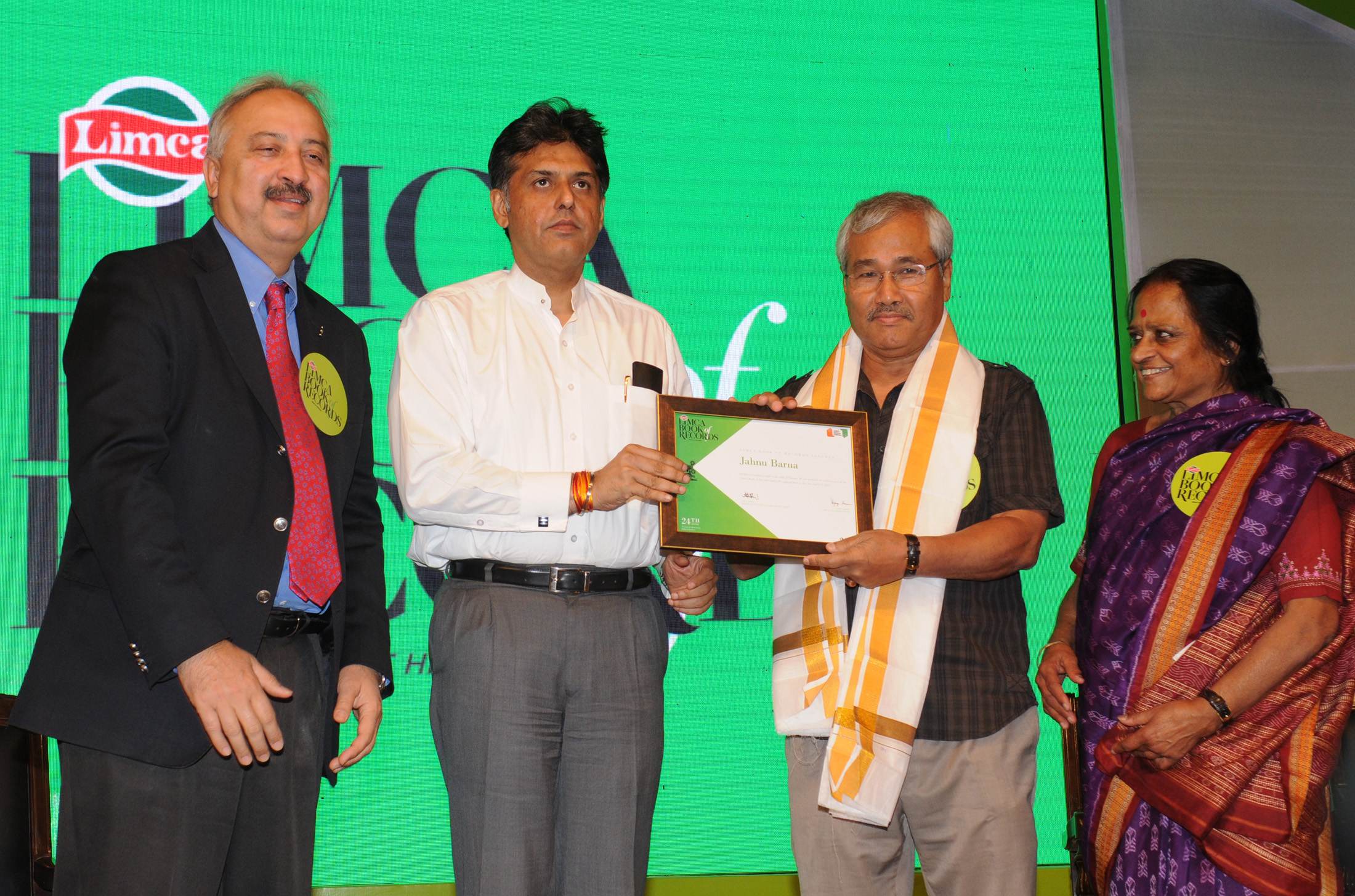
Jahnu Barua receiving the award

=== 2016 ===
15 renowned PWDs were chosen by the Limca Book of Records as People of the Year.

Image	Choice	State/Country	Notes	Ref.
	Akbar Khan	India		
	Ashwini Angadi	India		
	Aayushi Pareek	India		
	K. S. Rajanna	India		
	Major Devender Pal Singh	India		
	Saylee Nandkishor Agavane	India		
	Arunima Sinha	India		
	Dr. Suresh Advani	India		
	Javed Ahmad Tak	India		
	Ramsurat Majhi	India		
	Ranveer Singh Saini	India		
	Zameer Dhale	India		
	Rajive Raturi	India		
	K.Y. Venkatesh	India		
	Radhika Chand	India		

=== 2017 ===
20 celebrities from Indian cinema were chosen & awarded in year 2017.

Image	Choice	State/Country	Notes	Ref.
	Mani Ratnam	India		
	Aparna Sen	India		
	Mira Nair	India		
	Kamal Haasan	India		
	Gulzar	India		
	Naseeruddin Shah	India		
	V K Murthy	India		
	Prabhudeva	India		
	Jahnu Barua	India		
	K Vishwanath	India		
	Shabana Azmi	India		
	Bhanu Athaiya	India		
	Kajol	India		
	Vidya Balan	India		
	Tabu	India		
	Santosh Sivan	India		
	A Sreekar Prasad	India		
	Adoor Gopalakrishnan	India		
	Mike Pandey	India		

== See also ==
- Limca Book of Records
- Coca-Cola India
