= Andhra Education Society Schools =

Location
- New Delhi; India; 28°37′42″N 77°13′46″E

Information
- Motto: Knowledge is Light
- Established: 5 June 1948; 78 years ago
- Founder: Durgabai Deshmukh
- Gender: Co-educational
- Houses: 4
- Affiliations: CBSE
- Website: A.E.S. Official site

The Andhra Education Society (or AES) is a group of schools in New Delhi, India. Its main branch is located at Deen Dayal Upadhyay Marg, near ITO Metro Station. Having six branches at various parts of Delhi, the school serves the need of education for more than 7500 students.

== History ==
Dr. Durgabai Deshmukh was a freedom fighter and one of the most prominent leaders from South India. When she came to Delhi as a member of Constituent Assembly in 1947, she strongly felt the need for having proper education facilities for Telugu-speaking children in Delhi. as the language was becoming extinct

Andhra Education Society was therefore founded on 5 June 1948 by Dr. Durgabai Deshmukh along with a few other eminent Telugu persons living at that time in Delhi. It was registered as a Society with the aims and objects to provide facilities for imparting and promoting education of Telugu language and to inculcate, promote and preserve Telugu culture among Telugu People living in Delhi. The schools today imparts education to not only Telugu-speaking children but also to several non-Telugu students from various sections of society.

== Present Governing Members ==
S. No.	Title	Name	Designation
1.	Shri	P. Vasudeva Rao	President
2.	Shri	S. A. Alishah	Vice President
3.	Dr.	M. R. Murthy	Vice President
4.	Shri	S. Eswar Prasad	Secretary
5.	Shri	I. S. Rao	Joint Secretary
6.	Shri	Vasireddy Chatarjee	Treasurer
7.	Shri	B. V. Nageswara Rao	Joint Treasurer
8.	Shri	G. V. Raju	Member
9.	Shri	S. Nazeer Jan	Member
10.	Dr.	Vedantam Subhash	Member
11.	Dr.	B. B. G. Tilak	Member
12.	Dr.	U. R. Prasad	Member
13.	Shri	Chava Badrinath Babu	Member
14.	Shri	P. Ramana Reddy	Member
15.	Dr.	B. Srinivas	Member
16.	Shri	D. R. S. Kumar	Member
17.	Shri	Koka Radha Krishna	Member
18.	Shri	J. B. V. Reddy	Member
19.	Shri	G. Vijay Gopal	Member
20.	Shri	P. Chandrasekhar	Member
21.	Shri	B. V. Chalapathy Rao	Member
22.	Shri	C. Bheemanna	Member
23.	Shri	M. V. Subbarao	Member
24.	Shri	V. V. Rao	Member
25.	Shri	G. V. Rao	Member
26.	Dr.	M. Subbarayan	Member
27.	Dr.	V. Chandrasekhara Rao	Member
28.	Shri	D. V. S. Sastry	Member
29.	Dr.	P. Prashant	Member
30.	Shri	Maganti Raghuram	Member
31.	Shri	P. Ratna Charan Babu	Member
32.	Shri	K. K. Reddy	Member
33.	Shri	C. B. S. Reddy	Member

== Schools ==
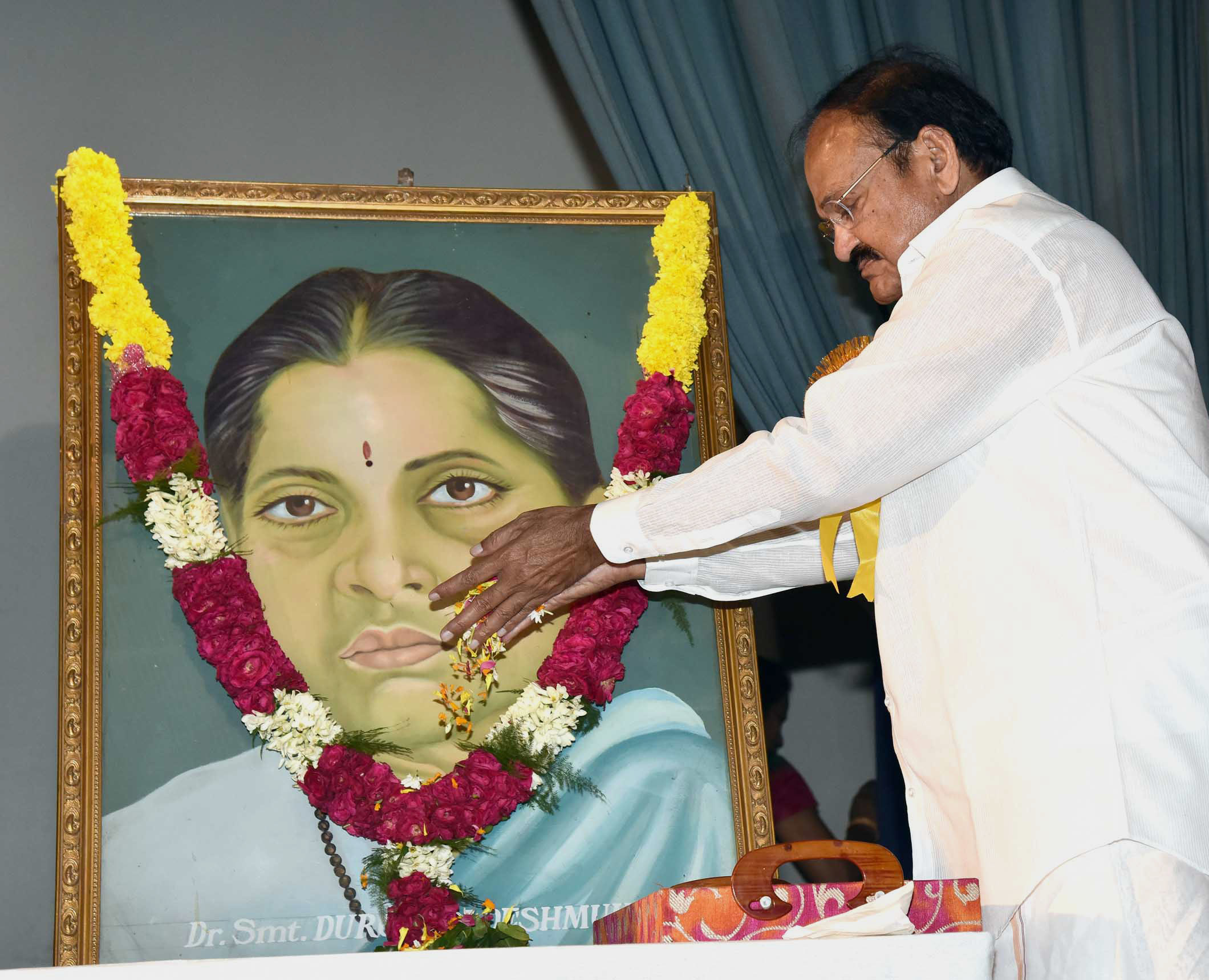
The Vice President, Shri M. Venkaiah Naidu paying homage to Dr. Durgabai Deshmukh at the Founder's Day Celebrations of Andhra Education Society, in New Delhi on 15 July 2018

=== AES Dr. Durgabai Deshmukh Memorial Sr. Sec. School (ITO) ===
Established on 5 June 1948 by Dr. Durgabai Deshmukh, A.E.S. ITO as it is commonly called began its operations from Deshmukh's home in New Delhi. It was started as a school for primary education. The school, named after its founder, today is located at 1, Deen Dayal Upadhyaya Marg, New Delhi. Interestingly, Deshmukh also inaugurated Sri Venkateswara College, one of the most reputed colleges of University of Delhi in the present school campus in the presence of Indira Gandhi.

The school is situated close to Tilak Bridge railway station of the Indian Railways network. Nearest metro station is ITO.

=== AES Dr. B.V. Nath & T. R. Rao Memorial Sr. Sec. School (Prasad Nagar) ===
AES Prasad Nagar was started in 1957, as a primary school with one teacher and few students in a 3 roomed residential flat in Karol Bagh due to unstinted efforts of B.V. Nath, T. Ramachandra Rao, Dr. Durgabai Deshmukh and many others. After several hurdles, the school was shifted to its present location in 1968. The first phase building of this school was opened on 30 August 1981 by Shri Prabhakaran Reddy, the then-Finance Minister of Andhra Pradesh on behalf of T. Anjaiah the then Chief Minister.

The school was first recognized as Middle School in 1968. It was upgraded as a Secondary school in 1982–83. Ultimately, the school was upgraded to Senior Secondary level in 1992–93 with grant-in-aid.

The school was renamed to its present name in 1994. Rajendra Place is the nearest metro station, less than one kilometre away from school. University of Delhi's Kalindi College is the nearest college for higher education.

=== AES N.T. Rama Rao Memorial Sr. Sec. School (Janakpuri) ===
AES Janakpuri was named after the popular actor-filmmaker and politician Padma Shri N.T. Rama Rao, who was also the 10th Chief Minister of Andhra Pradesh.

The school was established under an integrated development program in March 1975. It was started in a rented accommodation with four teachers and seventy students. The school was shifted to its present location in 1986 after constructing temporary sheds.

It was recognized for primary education in 1978, followed by middle and secondary level education in 1988. The school was upgraded to senior secondary level from academic year 1992–93. The foundation for present building was laid by former Speaker of Lok Sabha G. M. C. Balayogi on 28 April 1998 and was finally inaugurated by N. Chandrababu Naidu, the 13th Chief Minister of Andhra Pradesh on 28 October 2001.

Janakpuri West is the closest metro station located at a distance of just one kilometre. University of Delhi's Bharti College is the nearest center for higher education.

Like its sister branches, the school serves educational needs of not only Telugu community but also students of various other linguistic groups.

It consists of library and playgrounds of various sports like Basketball, Badminton, Volleyball, Kho-Kho, Kabaddi and a Tennis academy as well.

=== AES Dr. K. Ramesh Babu Memorial Sr. Sec. School (Pushp Vihar) ===
Like Janakpuri branch, this school was also established under an integrated development program in March 1975. The school is named after Dr. K Ramesh Babu, Secretary of Andhra Education Society during 1977–79 because of whose efforts this school was established.

The school was started with 22 students and two teachers in a rented accommodation in Lajpat Nagar where it got its recognition as a primary school in 1979. After being upgraded to a centre of elementary education in 1983, and secondary level by 1996, the school was shifted to its present location in 1998. The present building was inaugurated by N. Chandrababu Naidu, the 13th Chief Minister of Andhra Pradesh on 28 October 2001. The school was recently upgraded to an institution for senior secondary education.

The nearest metro station for the school is Malviya Nagar metro station located at a distance of two kilometres. Shaheed Bhagat Singh College and College of Vocational Studies of University of Delhi are the nearest colleges.

=== AES Middle School (R. K. Puram) ===
This school is the newest addition to Andhra Education Society. On 15 July 2018 which was also the 109th birth anniversary of Durgabai Deshmukh and is celebrated as the Founder's Day of AES Group of schools, Vice President of India, Shri M. Venkaiah Naidu virtually inaugurated this school from the ITO branch. Also present on this auspicious occasion was Narendra Chawla, Mayor of South Delhi.

AES Middle School is located in Sector-2 R. K. Puram.

== Curriculum and infrastructure ==
Recognized by the Delhi Administration, the school follows the CBSE Syllabus. It has laboratories, a library, computers, A/V facilities, play fields for all the major games (cricket, football, basketball, badminton and tennis), NCC & Scouts, eco clubs, and co-curricular activities like camping and educational excursions.

== School activities and sports ==
Various school events such as inter-school competitions (in May), annual sports meet (in November), carnivals, volunteer programs, etc. are organised regularly. The schools avidly participate in various competitions organized by Government of Delhi. They regularly feature in national and international levels of subject-based model making competitions.

== See also ==
- Durgabai Deshmukh
