= Miss & Mister Deaf World =

Miss & Mister Deaf World and Europe and Asia
- MMDW
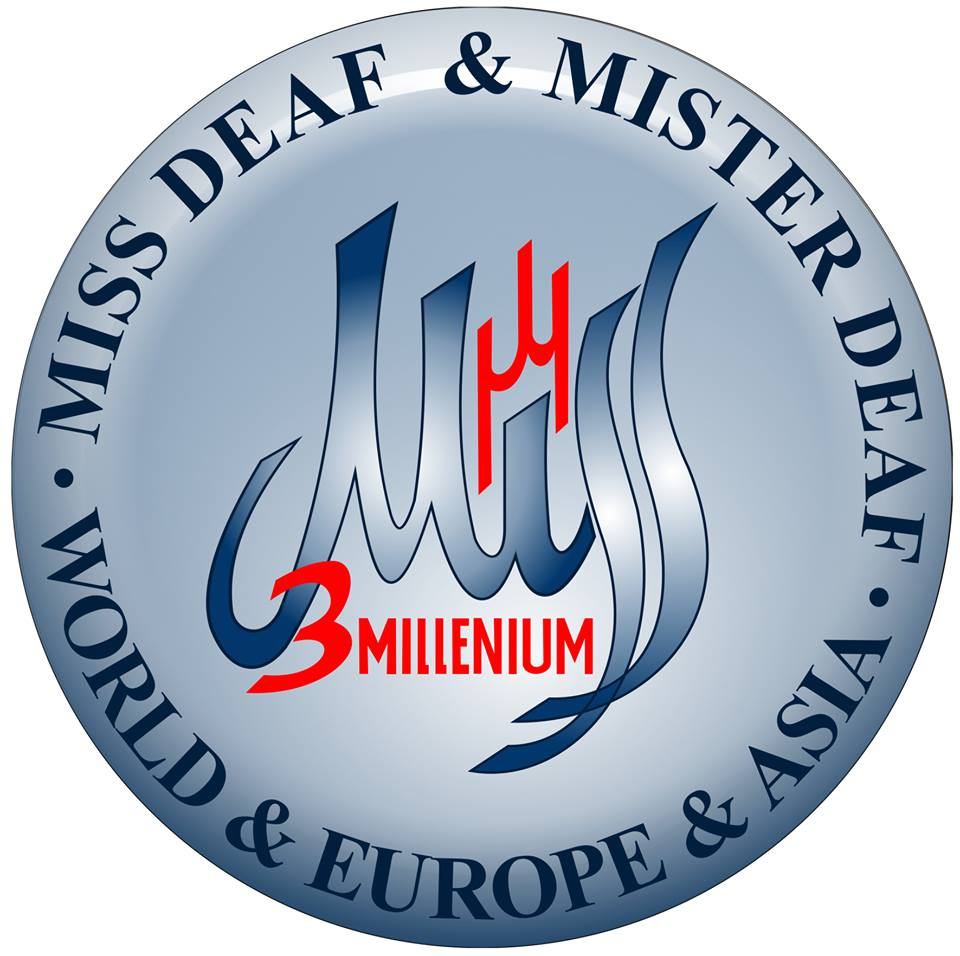
- Awarded for: International Beauty pageant
- Location: Prague
- Country: Czech Republic
- Presented by: Marihana Přibilová
- Hosted by: Josef Uhlíř
- Formerly called: Miss Deaf World (MDW)
- First award: 2001
- Winner(s): ♀ (India) Vidisha Baliyan (2019) ♂ (South Africa) Phumelela Purrah Mapukata (2019)
- Website: www.missdeafworld2011-2020.com

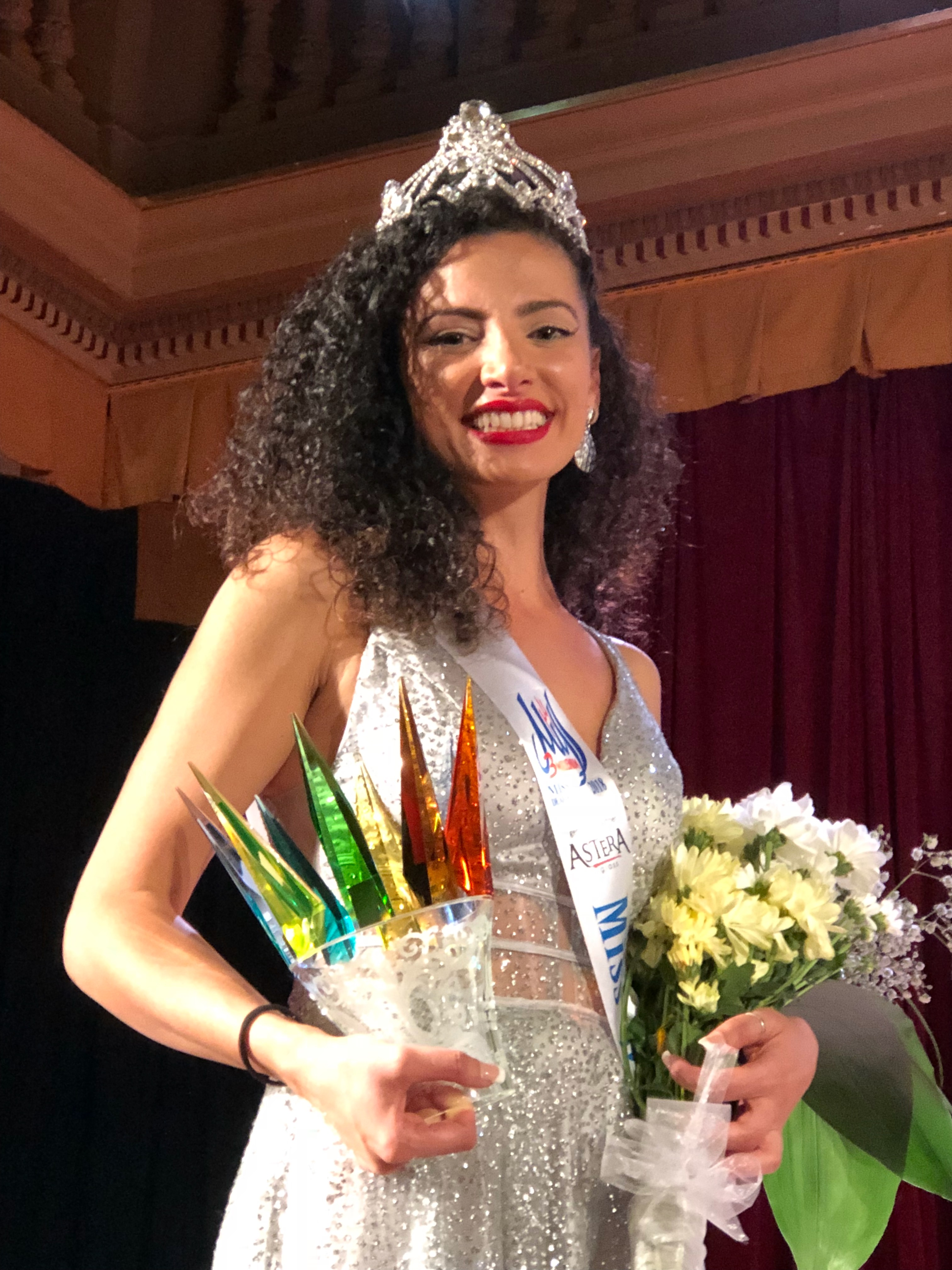
Miss Deaf World 2018 Assia Uhanany, September 29, 2018, Vinohrady, Prague

Miss & Mister Deaf World (MMDW) is an international beauty pageant which crowns young deaf women "Miss Deaf World" and young deaf men "Mister Deaf World" every year, usually in Prague, in the Czech Republic.

== History ==
MMDW is a Nonprofit organization which was created in 2001. The pageant is organised by the companies MISS DEAF s.r.o. and MISS – MISTER DEAF s.r.o., and their president is Josef Uhlíř. The official language in the contest is International Sign Language, and the crystal crowns for all the finalists are made by Astera s.r.o.

By the rules of the contest, a winner is disallowed to participate in another beauty contest. On July 9, 2010, there was a MDW contest in Tbilisi, Georgia, and Miss Julie Abbou from France contested. She won three titles of the first Vicemiss Deaf World 2010, the second Vicemiss Deaf World 2010 and of the Miss Sympathy Deaf World 2010. Afterwards, Abbou contested Miss Deaf International in Las Vegas, Nevada on July 31, 2010, and was crowned as Miss Deaf International. As a result, Uhlíř published an announcement at MDW website about disqualifying Abbou from the titles of 1st Vicemiss Deaf World 2010 and of Miss Sympathy Deaf World 2010, which Abbou won during the final ceremony of Miss Deaf World 2010 and Miss Deaf Europe 2010 competitions in Tbilisi. Uhlíř stated that during the MDW competitions, Abbou was personally informed, as well as the other competing girls, that in the case of receiving one of the official titles of the MDW competitions, the winner would be prohibited from participation in any other Miss competition. Uhlíř explained the reason for keeping the high status of the both competitions, keeping the high reputation of the gained titles and preventing any hurt of Miss Deaf World and Miss Deaf Europe competitions prestige. Uhlíř added that every girl could participate these competitions, even two times, if she was not awarded any of the titles during her first participation. He wrote that with validity from August 1, 2010, the title of first Vicemiss Deaf World 2010, which was taken from Abbou, went to Zhihuang Wang from China, and her title of second Vicemiss Deaf World 2010 went to Stella Falawo Kunjan from Ghana, which took originally the fourth place. The title of Miss Sympathy Deaf World 2010, which also was taken from Abbou by Uhlíř, would be won by Portia Oliver from South Africa, which took originally the second place in this category.

In 2018, Assia Uhanany from Israel won Miss Deaf World. Xu Jinghui, a contestant from Taiwan, took a photo with her, and wrote her impression of the contest. She told about the foreign environment in Prague, wishing to contact foreign Deaf friends from different countries, hopefully communicating with them. She wrote her daily activity: The second day was a free day, and they visited close attractions, starting to make Deaf friends by chatting each other with the international sign language. The third day to the sixth day were in the class, for practicing the show together, and sharing international sign language and Deaf culture among different countries. The show started on September 29, 2018, left her a little sad and discouraged, but it was a rare experience for her. She was happy to be able to go abroad and acquire a lot of foreign friends, and thanked the China Association of the Deaf for giving her such a chance to go abroad, and for teaching her international sign language as well.

On April 16, 2019, Uhlíř wrote sorrowfully about the death of Engineer Vladimír Žíla, a General partner of the world competitions, Miss & Mister Deaf World and Europe and Asia, and the Director of Astera glass.

On May 25, 2019, Miss Deaf World 2017 and Mister Deaf Europe 2018 got married in Croatia.

== Titleholders ==
Date and Place	Miss Deaf World	First Vicemiss Deaf World	Second Vicemiss Deaf World	Miss Deaf Europe	Miss Deaf Asia	Mister Deaf World	Mister Deaf Europe	Mister Deaf Asia
November 28, 2020. Prague, Czech Republic								
July 19, 2019. Mbombela, South Africa	Vidisha Baliyan India	Lethiwe Ntaka; South Africa	Caroline Costa; Brazil	Petra Jakopović; Croatia	Kanjana Phimpa; Thailand	Phumelela Mapukata; South Africa	Petro Mendryshora; Ukraine	Chunping Zhou; China
September 29, 2018. National House of Vinohrady, Convention Center, Prague	Assia Uhanany (31 years); Israel	Juthathip Srithamrongwat Thailand	Ludmila Krautsova Belarus	Andreea-Maria Stîngaciu; Romania	Nishtha Dudeja; India	Jan Jakub Matěj Emmer (33 years); Czech Republic	Josip José Smokvina; Croatia	Mani Gulati; India
July 15, 2017. Prague Congress Centre	Chutima Netsuriwong (23 years); Thailand	Maria Puposka; North Macedonia; Then: Ana-Maria Barnjak; Croatia; By MMDW website	Inna Demidova; Belarus	Petra Gluchová; Czech Republic	Manman Hao; China	Eric Alcantara Pascual; Spain	Bagou Chehiban; France	Yu Chen Lin 林祐臣; Taiwan
July 16, 2016. Congress Hall of TOP Hotel Prague	Janetta Hendrika Liaane Erasmus; South Africa	Aminaka Gako; Senegal	Victoria Soo Lum; Canada	Elena Novokhatskaya; Ukraine	Caoyue Piao; South Korea	Kevin Petit; France	Alberto Jorgues Mora; Spain	Tian Ye; China
July 18, 2015. Congress Hall of TOP Hotel Prague	Natalija Bilanová; Ukraine	Anastasia Viazovskaya; Belarus	Lé Thi Thuy Doan; Vietnam	Karina Astrid Jemmott; United Kingdom	Lin Ching Lan 林靖嵐; Taiwan	Camilo Viloria Arrieta; Colombia	Tomáš Brož; Czech Republic	Sophon Sae-Li; Thailand
Date and Place	Miss Deaf World	First Vicemiss Deaf World	Second Vicemiss Deaf World	Miss Deaf Europe	Miss Deaf Sympathy	Mister Deaf World	Mister Deaf Europe	Not awarded
July 19, 2014. Congress Hall of TOP Hotel Prague	Lydia Svobodova; Slovakia	Maria Isabel Carlos Maia; Brazil	Xiao Yuan Liu; China	Olivera Lozić; Serbia	Pitiyanan Matthayomphan; Thailand	Jean-Marie Bourdon; France	David Spiess; Austria	Not awarded
July 13, 2013. Congress Hall of TOP Hotel Prague	Thaisy Payo (25 years); Brazil	Erika Ďuricová (20 years); Slovakia	Queval Marianne (23 years); France	Kinal Timea Melinda (23 years); Hungary	Niahkale Sako (22 years); Mali	Christian Paul López Bernal (26 years); Mexico	Bohuš Vlačuha (20 years); Czech Republic	Not awarded
July 7, 2012. Congress Hall of TOP Hotel Prague	Karin Keuter (20 years); Germany	Maiko Sakvarelashvili (20 years); Georgia	Mariana Latseviuk; Ukraine	Mariana Latseviuk; Ukraine	Adjelina Corovic; Montenegro	Not awarded		
July 8, 2011. Prague	Ilaria Galbusera; Italy	Elena Korchagina; Russia	Dian Inggravati Soebangil; Indonesia; Title was revoked	Natalya Ryabova; Belarus	Ilaria Galbusera; Italy	Not awarded		
July 9, 2010. Tbilisi, Georgia	Alena Smyslova; Russia	Zhihuang Wang; China	Stella Falawo Kunjan; Ghana	Alena Smyslova; Russia	Portia Stacei Oliver; South Africa	Not awarded		
2009. Prague	Diana Kotvun; Ukraine	Simhiwe Magagula; Eswatini	Mariya Baranova; Russia	Nina Dividtinidze; Georgia	Zuzana Zliechovcova; Slovakia	Not awarded		
July 12, 2008. Prague	Rossana Mazzocchio (19 years); United Kingdom	Michaela Theimerova (21 years); Czech Republic	Yulia Arslanova (19 years); Russia	Not awarded	Jasmin Katzberg (22 years); Germany	Not awarded		
July 14, 2007. Prague	Qingling Baova (25 years); China	Kristina Weber (21 years); Germany	Nila Kudlykova (19 years); Ukraine	Not awarded	Terneil Nicole Oppel (19 years); South Africa	Not awarded		
2006. Prague	Ivana Novelic; Serbia	Marina Chukhriy; Ukraine	Viera Zliechcová; Slovakia	Not awarded	Angeligue Verstraete; Belgium	Not awarded		
2005. Prague	Petronela Petrovičová; Slovakia	Daniejela Bukvic; Serbia	Julia Agapova; Russia	Not awarded	Not awarded	Not awarded		
2004. Prague	Candice Morgan (22 years); South Africa; Title was revoked	Vaida Kuzminskyte (22 years); Lithuania	Tatyana Prichodko (21 years); Ukraine	Not awarded	Tatyana Prichodko (21 years); Ukraine	Not awarded		
July 19, 2003. Prague	Galina Broiko (21 years); Ukraine; Then: Nastjana Pridok; Ukraine; By MMDW website	Natalia Chochlova (22 years); Russia	Sara Melech (16 years); Israel	Not awarded	Zhang Huanying (25 years); China	Not awarded		
2002. Prague	Danijela Gedovic; Serbia	Ludmila Šinglarová; Czech Republic	Natália Martinenko; Ukraine	Not awarded	Not awarded	Not awarded		
2001. Mallorca	Viktoriia Prytychenko; Ukraine	Bulgaria	Czech Republic	Not awarded	Not awarded	Not awarded		

== See also ==
- List of beauty pageants
