= Candice Morgan =

South African model

- Born: December 27, 1980 (age 44); Lenasia, Johannesburg, South Africa

Candice Morgan (born 27 December 1980 in Lenasia, Johannesburg, South Africa) is an actress and former beauty queen from South Africa. Morgan was crowned Miss Deaf South Africa 2004 at the Performer Theater in Pretoria. She was crowned Miss Deaf World in July of the same year in Prague, Czech Republic.

"I would like to prove to the hearing world that deaf people can do anything they can and sometimes even better. As a young woman hoping to be in parliament one day, I would like to fight for the rights of women, especially deaf women.", she said during her victory speech.

== Early career ==
Morgan matriculated at MC Kharbai School for the Deaf, after which she studied information technology at Esselen Park. She started presenting for DTV at the age of 16 and became a full-time member of staff in 2002. She made her acting debut in Eve's Cradle, an award-winning DTV drama. The character she portrays is a young Indian girl from a strict Tamil family who falls pregnant. Her parents refuse to accept the pregnancy and Yashika is one of an unfortunate trio who land in the claws of Jakoff, a sinister Bulgarian who runs an internet adoption project.

== Controversy ==
Morgan disclosed that she had given birth to a baby boy in December 2004. This contravened the rules of both competitions. She held firm that she had had no idea that she was pregnant during the competitions, yet organizers of Miss Deaf South Africa claimed that they had had to get legal help after she neglected her duties and did not turn up for commitments. This included being absent from the Paralympics opening ceremony, citing back problems. In a letter to the organizers, Morgan claimed that she wanted to be open about the birth of her son with Miss Deaf South Africa.

== Current activities ==
She returned to television soon after the scandal erupted to direct, edit and present DTV. As a celebrity she has used her status to fight for deaf rights in South Africa.
