= Ranveer Singh Saini =

Indian golfer (born 2000)

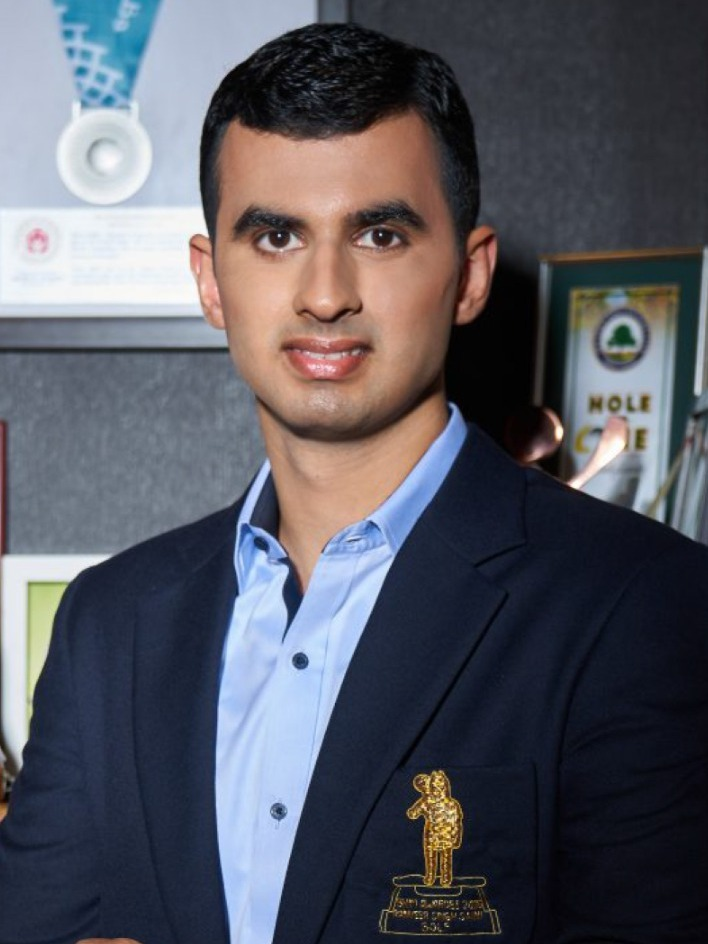
- Saini in 2024

Personal information
- Nationality: Indian
- Born: 2000 (age 25–26) Haryana, India

Sport
- Sport: Golf
- Disability: Autism
- Club: DLF Golf & Country Club

Ranveer Singh Saini (born 2000) is an Indian golfer and Special Olympics athlete from Gurugram, Haryana. He is the first Indian golfer to win a gold medal at the Special Olympics World Games. Diagnosed with autism at an early age, Saini has received several national honors, including the Bhim Award and the National Award for Individual Excellence.

== Early life ==
Saini was born in Gurugram, Haryana. Diagnosed with autism spectrum disorder at the age of two, he was introduced to golf by his parents at age nine. He trained at DLF Golf and Country Club in Gurugram and later completed his schooling at Scottish High International School, where his father serves as chairman.

== Career ==
Saini became the first Indian golfer to win a gold medal at the Special Olympics World Games, achieving this in the Level 2 Alternate Shot Team Play event at the 2015 Games in Los Angeles. Prior to this, he won two gold medals at the 2013 Special Olympics Asia Pacific Golf Masters in Macau. He also earned a silver medal at the 2019 Special Olympics World Games in Abu Dhabi.

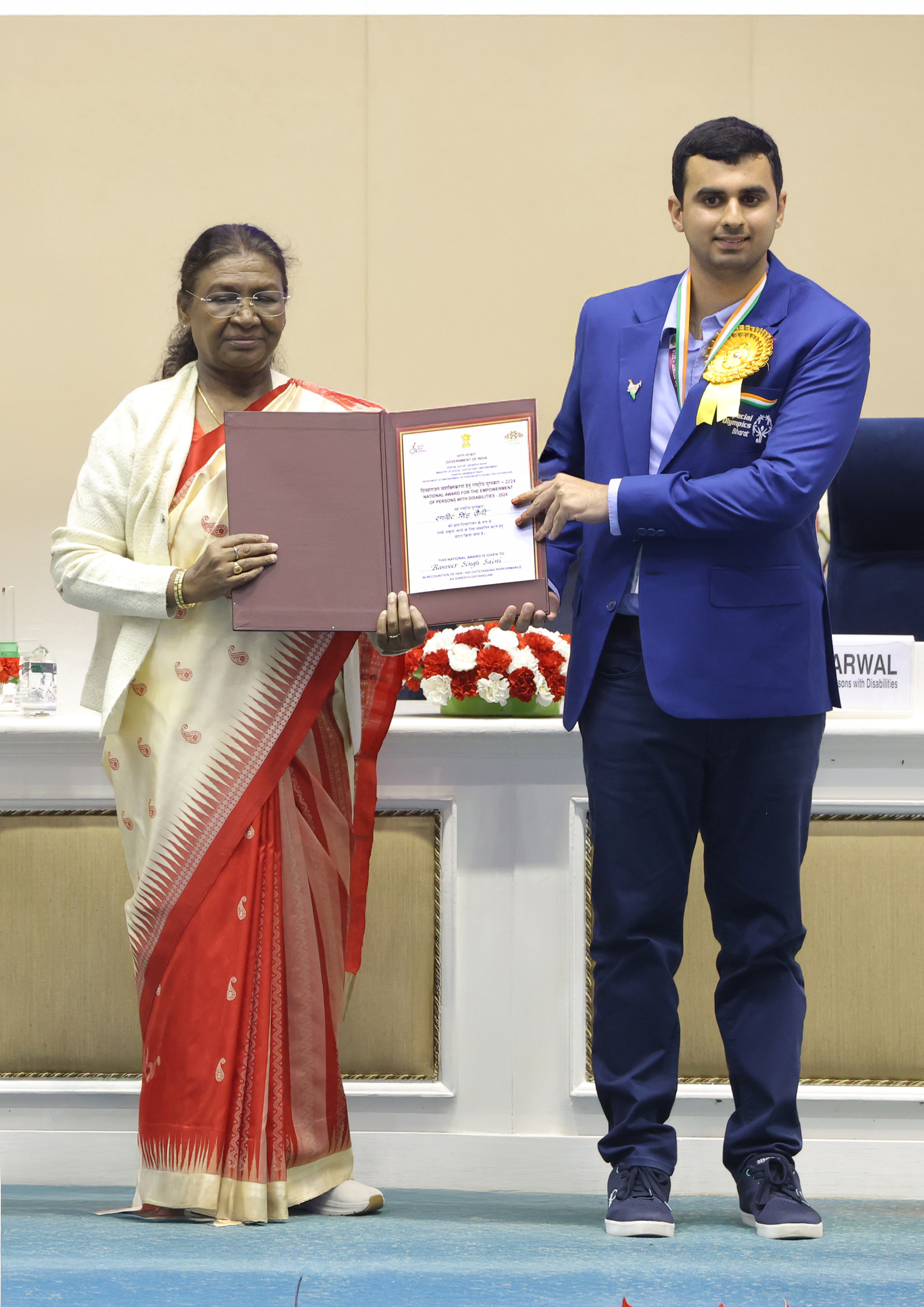
Droupadi Murmu presenting the National Award for the Empowerment of Persons with Disabilities to Saini in 2024

== Awards and recognition ==
- Shresth Divyangjan Award National Award (2024), presented by the President of India
- Bhim Award (2016–17), Haryana's highest sports honor
- Limca Book of Records (2016)
- Mentioned by Prime Minister Narendra Modi in Mann Ki Baat (2023)
- Special Guest at Republic Day Parade (2025)
- Haryana Khel Gaurav Award (2023)
- Limca Book of Records honoree (2013–2016, 2020–2024)
- Recognized by Grant Thornton, Education Today, Delhi Minorities Commission, and Golf Foundation India
- Ranveer also secured a gold medal at the 2023 World Games held in Berlin
- Ranveer Singh Saini clinched gold at the 2025 Macau Golf Masters
