= Bhim Award =

Haryanan honour given for sporting achievement

The Bhim Award is the highest sports honor given by the government of Haryana, India, for "outstanding performance in national and international competitions". The Bhim Award is to recognize the achievement of those sportspersons who have brought honors to the Haryana State in their games and sports at recognized international championship/cup/games and senior national championship/cup/games. It began in 2001.

== Notable awardees ==
- Ranveer Singh Saini -2018- Golf
