= Ilaria Galbusera =

Italian model and volleyball player (born 1991)

- Born: Ilaria Galbusera; February 3, 1991 (age 35); Bergamo, Italy
- Beauty pageant titleholder
- Hair color: Black
- Eye color: Black
- Major competitions: Miss Deaf World 2011 (winner), Miss Deaf Sympathy 2011 (winner)

Ilaria Galbusera
Medal record

Representing Italy

Deaflympics
Silver medal – second place	Samsun 2017	volleyball team

Ilaria Galbusera (Italian pronunciation: [iˈiaːrja galbuˈzeːra]; born 3 February 1991) is an Italian deaf female model, beauty pageant contestant, and volleyball player. She has represented Italy at the Deaflympics in 2009, 2013, and 2017 as a volleyball player. Ilaria won the 2011 Miss Deaf World global beauty contest, which was held in Prague. Galbusera was also part of the Italian women's volleyball team, which claimed a silver medal during the 2017 Summer Deaflympics.

== Miss Deaf World 2011 ==
Ilaria Galbusera competed as one of the 38 finalists in the 11th edition of the Miss Deaf World contest in 2011, held in Congress Hall Top Hotel, Prague, Czech Republic. She was crowned as the Miss Deaf World 2011 at age 20, while Elena Korchagina emerged as 1st runners-up and Dian Inggrawati as 2nd runners-up. Galbusera was also crowned as the Miss Deaf Sympathy 2011.
