= Durgabai Deshmukh Hospital =

- Andhra Mahila Sabha

Geography
- Location: Vidyanagar, Hyderabad, India

Organisation
- Affiliated university: National Board of Examinations

Services
- Emergency department: yes
- Beds: ~ 200

History
- Founded: 1962

Links
- Website: www.durgabaideshmukhhospitals.com

Durgabai Deshmukh Hospital and Research Centre is a multispeciality hospital in Vidyanagar, Hyderabad in Telangana.

Veteran freedom fighter Durgabai Deshmukh started it as a nursing home with 15 beds in 1962 with the objective to serve the poor. It has grown into a full-fledged hospital with more than 200 beds. It works under the umbrella of Andhra Mahila Sabha.

In 2015 the management handed over one building to Care Hospital for Cardiology services.

== Academics ==
- This hospital is accredited to National Board of Examinations, Ministry of Health and Family welfare, Government of India for the award of Diplomate of National Board in Gynecology and Obstetrics, General Medicine, General Surgery, Cardiology, ENT, Orthopedics, Anesthesia, Pediatrics and Family Medicine. It is the first hospital in Andhra Pradesh to start the DNB programme.
- Paramedical courses in Cath Laboratory Technician Training, Respiratory Therapy Training, Perfusion Technician Training, ECT Technician Training and Anesthesiology Technician Training are offered from the year 1999.
- College of Physiotherapy was established in 1999 with intake of 50 students annually for the Degree of Bachelor of Physiotherapy (BPT) under Dr NTR University of Health Sciences.
- College of Nursing is established in the academic year 2004 with an intake of 50 students every year. It is recognized by Indian Council of Nursing, New Delhi.
- School of Nursing is established with 31/2 years duration course in General Nursing and Midwifery is conducted with an intake of 60 students per year.
- Multipurpose Health Workers Training is a programme for duration of 18 months duration. The annual intake is 40 students in each centre.
- College of Biomedical Engineering is associated with Osmania University for the teaching and training of its Biomedical Engineering students.

== Facilities ==
The hospital has 24 hours diagnostic facilities, Blood Bank, Family Planning Unit, Immunization programme, 24 hours Pharmacy, Spacious Library and Hostel Facility.

== Departments ==
- Pediatrics
- General Medicine
- Otorhinolaryngology E.N.T
- Orthopaedics
- Ophthalmology
- General Surgery

== DDH, Chennai ==
Durgabai Deshmukh General Hospital and Research Centre of Andhra Mahila Sabha was established at Adyar near Chennai in the year 1950. The institution was started by Durgabai Deshmukh as milk distribution centre. It has grown into a modern Multi-Specialty hospital, over last 53 years.

The hospital has facilities in General Medicine, General Surgery, Obstetrics and Gynaecology, Pediatrics, Neonatology and Geriatrics. Specialists consultants in Dentistry, ENT, Cardiology, Diabetology, Endocrinology, Urology, Psychiatry, Pulmonology, Pediatric Surgery, Gastroenterology are available.
