= Durgabai Deshmukh =

Indian freedom fighter, lawyer, and politician

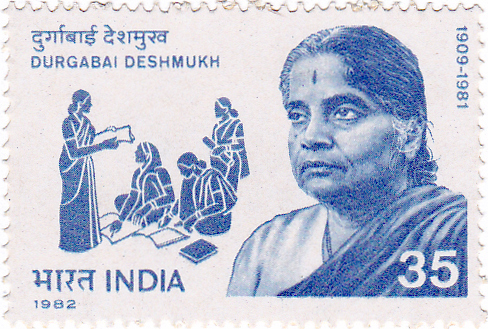
- Deshmukkh on a 1982 Indian stamp
- Born: 15 July 1909; Rajahmundry, Madras Presidency, British India (now Andhra Pradesh, India)
- Died: 9 May 1981 (aged 71); Narasannapeta, Andhra Pradesh, India
- Education: Madras University
- Spouse: C.D. Deshmukh (m. 1953)
- Awards: Padma Vibhushan

Durgabāi Deshmukh (née Gummididala, 15 July 1909 – 9 May 1981) was an Indian freedom fighter, lawyer, social worker and politician. She was a member of the Constituent Assembly of India and of the Planning Commission of India.

A public activist for women's emancipation, she founded the Andhra Mahila Sabha (Andhra Women's Conference) in 1937. She was also the founder chairperson of the Central Social Welfare Board. In 1953, she married C.D. Deshmukh, the first Indian governor of the Reserve Bank of India and Finance Minister in India's Central Cabinet from 1950 to 1956.

== Early life ==
Durgabai Gummididala was born on 15 July, 1909 into a Madhwa Brahmin family from Rajahmundry, Andhra Pradesh, British India. Durgabai was married when she was 8 years old with Subba Rao. She refused to live with him after her maturation, and her father and brother supported her decision. She later left him to continue her education.

== Personal life ==
In 1953, she married the then Finance Minister of India Chintaman Deshmukh. According to her own account, Prime Minister Jawaharlal Nehru was one of the three witnesses. C. D. Deshmukh had a daughter from a previous marriage but the couple remained otherwise childless. Though she had parted ways with Subba Rao, she supported his widow Timmaiamma after his death. Timmaiamma lived with Durgabai and Chintaman Deshmukh, and Durgabai also organised for her to get vocational training. Durgabai Deshmukh authored a book called The Stone That Speaketh. Her autobiography Chintaman and I was published one year before her death in 1981.

== Career ==
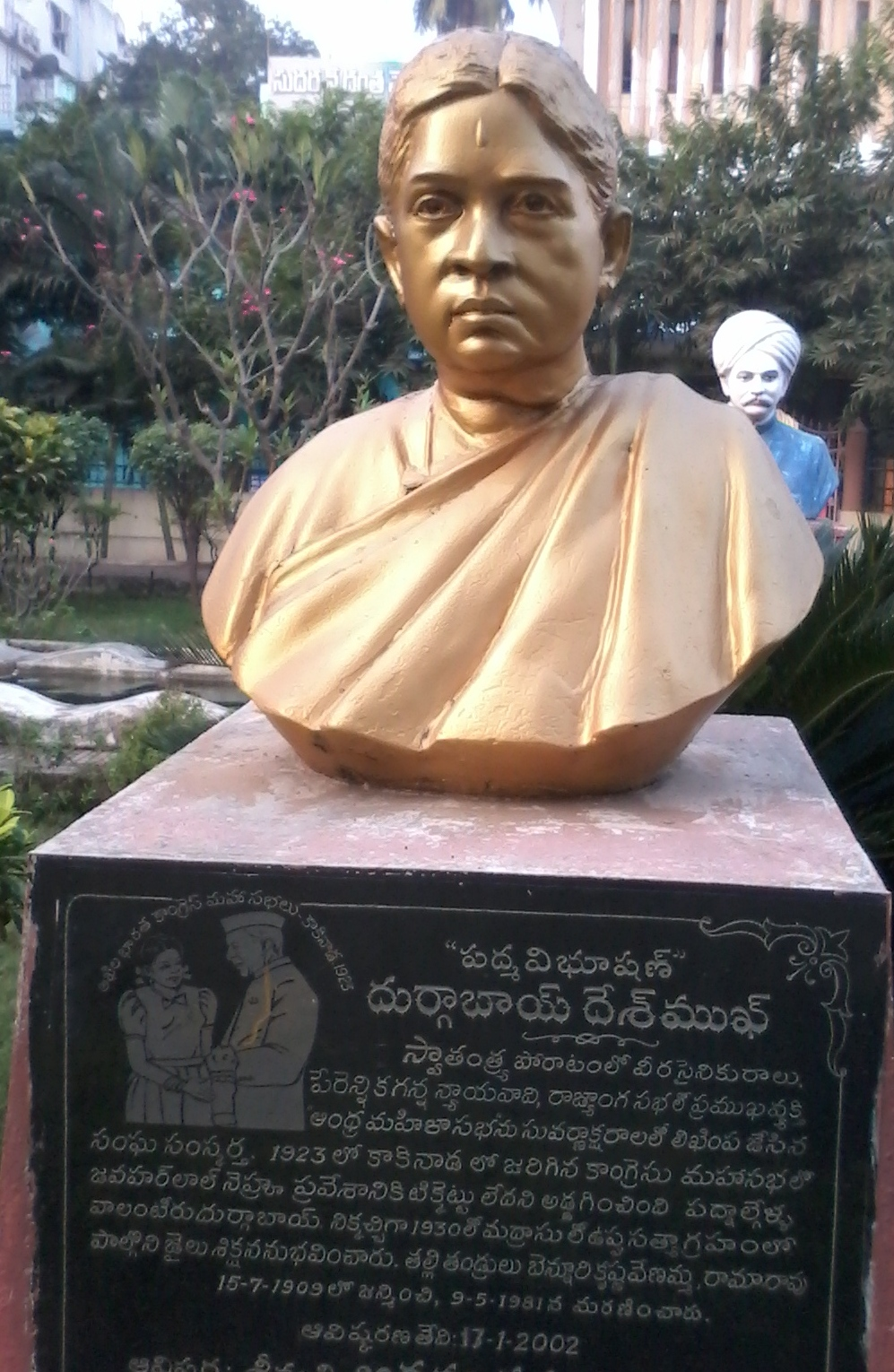
Statue of Durgabai Deshmukh in Rajahmundry

From her early years, Durgabai had been associated with Indian politics. At age 12, she left school in protest to the imposition of English-medium education. She later started the Balika Hindi Paathshala in Rajamundry to promote Hindi education for girls.

When the Indian National Congress had its conference in her hometown of Kakinada in 1923, she was a volunteer and placed in charge of the Khadi exhibition that was running side by side. Her responsibility was to ensure that visitors without tickets didn't enter. She fulfilled the responsibility given to her honestly and even forbade Jawaharlal Nehru from entering. When the organisers of the exhibition saw what she did and angrily chided her, she replied that she was only following instructions. She allowed Nehru in only after the organisers bought a ticket for him. Nehru praised the girl for the courage with which she did her duty.

She followed to Mahatma Gandhi in India's struggle for freedom from the British Raj. She never wore jewellery or cosmetics, and she was a satyagrahi. As a prominent social reformer she participated in Gandhi-led Salt Satyagraha activities during the Civil Disobedience Movement. She was instrumental in organising women satyagrahis in the movement. This led to British Raj authorities imprisoning her three times between 1930 and 1933.

After her release from prison, Durgabai continued her studies. She finished her B.A. and her M.A. in political science in the 1930s from Andhra University. She went on to obtain her law degree from Madras University in 1942, and started practicing as an advocate in Madras High Court.

Durgabai was the president of the Blind Relief Association. In that capacity, she set up a school-hostel and a light engineering workshop for the blind.

Durgabai was a member of the Constituent Assembly of India. She was the only woman in the panel of chairmen in the Constituent Assembly. She was instrumental in the enactment of many social welfare laws.

She failed to get elected to Parliament in 1952, and was later nominated to be a member of the Planning Commission. In that role, she mustered support for a national policy on social welfare. The policy resulted in the establishment of a Central Social Welfare Board in 1953. As the Board's first chairperson, she mobilized a large number of voluntary organizations to carry out its programs, which were aimed at education, training, and rehabilitation of needy women, children, and the disabled.

She was the first to emphasise the need to set up separate Family Courts after studying the same during her visit to China in 1953. She discussed the idea with Justice M.C. Chagla and Justice P.B. Gajendragadkar of the Bombay High Court (at that time) and also with Jawaharlal Nehru. With similar demands for speedy justice for women in familial matters from women's movement and organisations, the Family Courts Act was enacted in 1984.

She was the first chairperson of the National Council on Women's Education, established by the Government of India in 1958. In 1959, the committee presented its recommendations, as follows:

1. "The Centre and State Governments should give priority to the education of girls.
2. In the central ministry of education, a department of women's education should be created.
3. For proper education of girls, a Director of Women's Education should be appointed in each state.
4. Co-education should be properly organised at higher level of education.
5. The University Grants Commission should specify a definite amount separately for the education of girls.
6. In the first phase of development, provision of free education should be made for girls up to Class VIII
7. Facilities in the choice of optional subjects should be made available for girls.
8. Girls should get training facilities on a liberal basis.
9. Education of Girls should be given due encouragement in rural areas.
10. A large number of seats in various services should be reserved for them.
11. Programmes for the development of adult women's education should be properly initiated and encouraged."

To commemorate her legacy, Andhra University, Visakhapatnam has named its Department of Women Studies as Dr. Durgabai Deshmukh Centre for Women's Studies.

In 1963, she was sent to Washington D.C. as a member of the Indian delegation to the World Food Congress.

== Contribution in Constituent Assembly ==
Durgabai Deshmukh was then elected to the Constituent Assembly from the Madras Province. She was the only woman in the panel of chairmen in the Constituent Assembly. She proposed Hindustani (Hindi+Urdu) as the national language of India but also expressed fear about the forceful campaign for Hindi in South India. She proposed a period of fifteen years of status quo to enable all the non-Hindi speakers to adopt and learn Hindi.

== Awards ==
- Paul G Hoffman Award
- Nehru Literacy Award
- UNESCO Award (for outstanding work in the field of literacy)
- Padma Vibhushan award from the government of India
- Jeevan award and Jagadeesh award

== Organizations established by Durgabai ==
- Andhra Mahila Sabha in 1938.
- Council for Social Development
- Durgabai Deshmukh Hospital in 1962.
- Sri Venkateswara College, New Delhi

Andhra Education Society (AES) was founded in 1948 by Dr. Durgabai Deshmukh to serve the educational needs of Telugu children residing in Delhi.
