= A. Sreekar Prasad =

Indian film editor (born 1963)

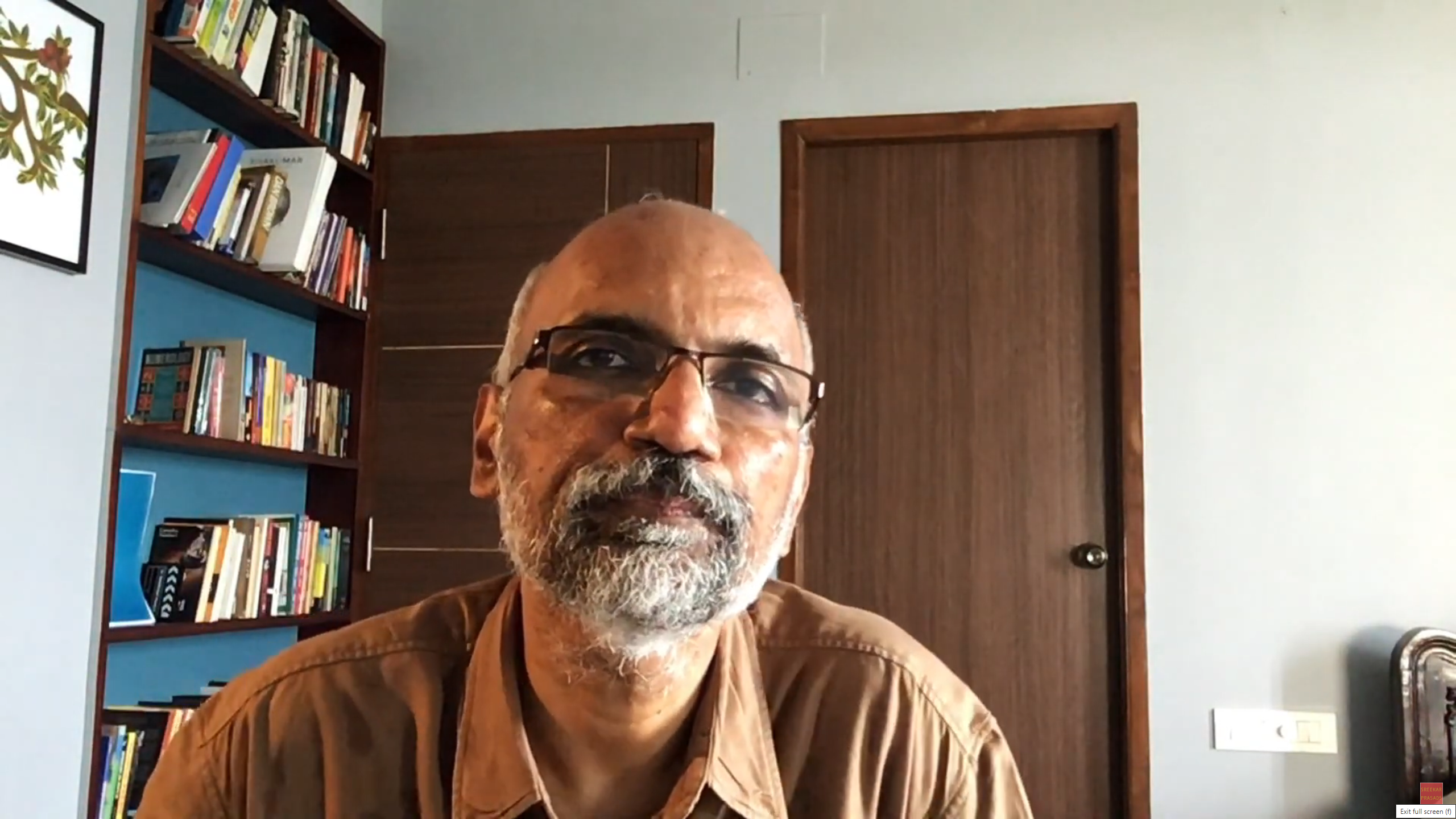
- Sreekar Prasad in 2020
- Born: Akkineni Sreekar Prasad; 12 March 1963 (age 63); Madras, Madras state, India
- Occupation: Film editor
- Years active: 1983–present
- Works: Full list
- Relatives: L. V. Prasad (paternal uncle); A. Ramesh Prasad (cousin); K. B. Tilak (cousin)
- Website: www.sreekarprasad.com

Akkineni Sreekar Prasad is an Indian film editor known for his works across Hindi, Malayalam, Tamil, Telugu and Assamese language films. In a career spanning more than 35 years, he has edited over 600 films. He is a recipient of nine National Film Awards including seven wins for Best Editing which is a record in that category. He also won five Kerala State Film Awards, two Andhra Pradesh state Nandi Awards, and four Filmfare Awards among others.

He was included in the Limca Book of Records 'People of the Year - 2013' list for his contribution to Indian cinema in several languages. Prasad also holds the record for "films edited in most number of languages" in Limca Book of Records. He has edited films from 17 languages so far.

== Early and personal life ==
Sreekar Prasad was born into a Telugu family in Madras to film editor and director Akkineni Sanjeevi, the younger brother of Telugu film doyen L. V. Prasad. His family hails from the village of Somavarappadu near Eluru in Andhra Pradesh. His father had five siblings — four brothers and a sister. Akkineni Ramesh Prasad, son of L. V. Prasad is his cousin. K. B. Tilak, independence activist and filmmaker is also a cousin of his — the son of his paternal aunt.

His son is Akshay Akkineni, director of Pizza. Akshay is married to P. S. Keerthana, daughter of actors R. Parthiban and Seetha. Sreekar was the editor of Keerthana's star vehicle Kannathil Muthamittal.

== Career ==
Sreekar Prasad was a graduate of literature from University of Madras. He learned the art of film editing from his father in Telugu cinemas. Though he started out with Telugu language films, he rose to national acclaim through Tamil, Malayalam, and Hindi films. He has won the National Film Award for Best Editing seven times and one Special Jury Award, throughout a career spanning over two decades.

Some of the notable editing works of Sreekar Prasad include Yodha (1992), Nirnayam (1995), Vanaprastham (1999), Alaipayuthey (2000), Dil Chahta Hai (2001), Kannathil Muthamittal (2002), Okkadu (2003), Aayutha Ezhuthu/Yuva (2004), Navarasa (2005), Anandabhadram (2005), Guru (2007), Firaaq (2008), Kaminey (2009), Pazhassi Raja (2009), Kutty Srank (2010), Shaitan (2011), Thuppakki (2012), Thanga Meenkal (2013), Kaththi (2014), Talvar (2015), Chekka Chivantha Vaanam (2018), Sye Raa Narasimha Reddy (2019), Sivaranjiniyum Innum Sila Pengalum (2020), RRR (2022), Ponniyin Selvan: I (2022), and "The Goat Life" (2024).

== Awards ==
National Film Awards

- 1989: Best Editing - Raakh
- 1997: Best Editing - Rag Birag
- 1997: Best Non-Feature Film Editing - Nauka Caritramu
- 1998: Best Editing - The Terrorist
- 2000: Best Editing - Vaanaprastham
- 2002: Best Editing - Kannathil Muthamittal
- 2008: Best Editing - Firaaq
- 2010: Special Jury Award - Kutty Srank, Kaminey, Kerala Varma Pazhassi Raja
- 2020: Best Editing - Sivaranjiniyum Innum Sila Pengalum

Kerala State Film Awards

- 1992: Best Editing - Yodha
- 1999: Best Editing - Karunam, Vaanaprastham, Jalamarmaram
- 2001: Best Editing - Sesham
- 2005: Best Editing - Anandabhadram
- 2009: Best Editing - Pazhassi Raja

Nandi Awards

- 2000: Best Editing - Manoharam
- 2003: Best Editing - Okkadu

Filmfare Awards

- 2002: Best Editing - Dil Chahta Hai
- 2010: Best Editing - Firaaq
- 2016: Best Editing - Talvar
- 2022: Best Editing - Shershaah

Vijay Awards

- 2007: Best Editing - Kattradhu Thamizh
- 2009: Best Editing - Yavarum Nalam

Other awards

- 2008: DIFF Best Editing - Firaaq

== See also ==
- National Film Award for Best Editing
