= Assia Uhanany =

Israeli model

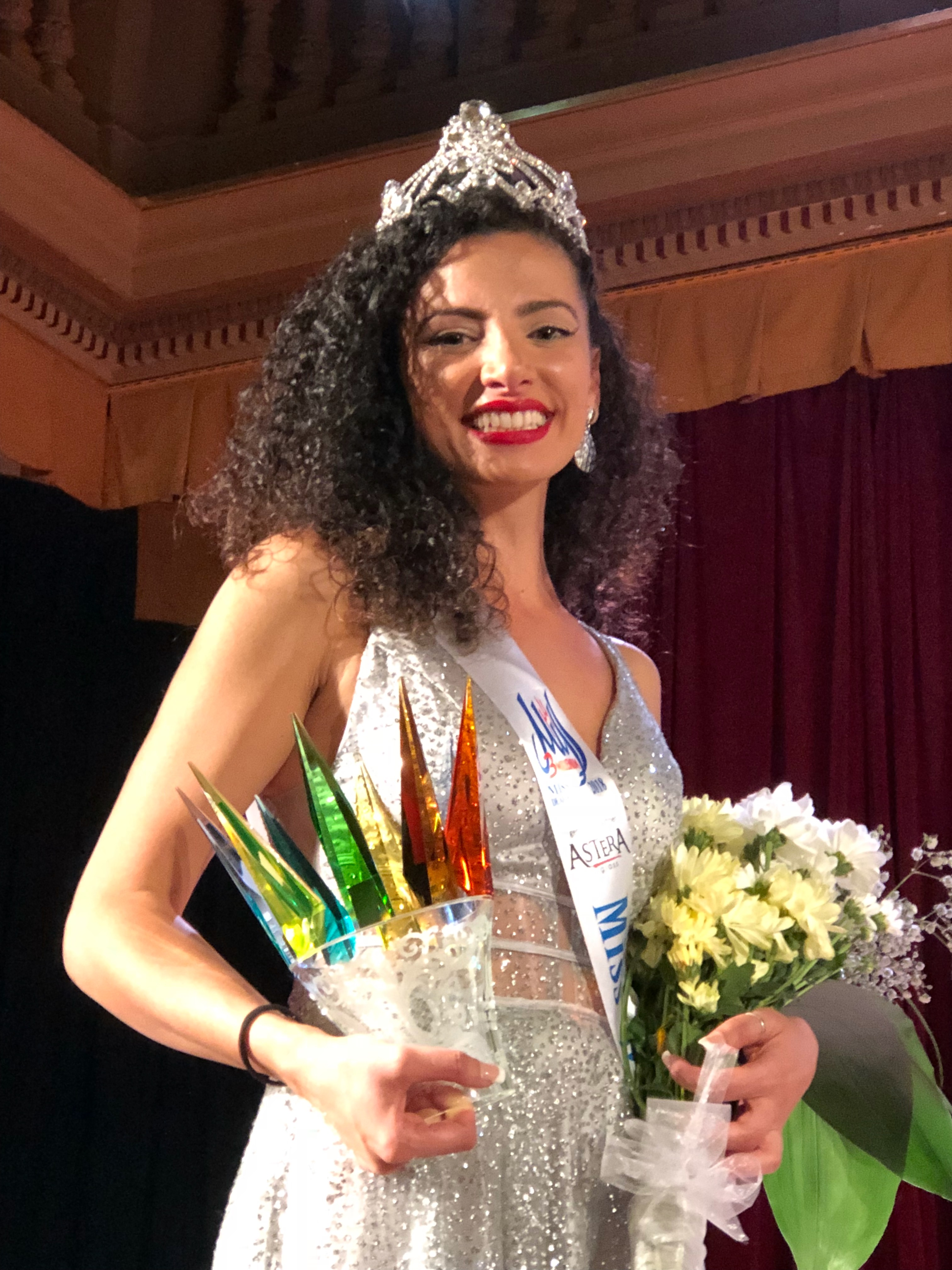
- Assia Uhanany crowned as Miss Deaf World 2018
- Born: March 13, 1987 (age 39)
- Beauty pageant titleholder
- Hair color: Black
- Eye color: Brown
- Major competition: Miss Deaf World 2018 (winner)

Assia Uhanany (Hebrew: אסיה אוחנני; born March 13 1987) is an Israeli deaf model and beauty pageant contestant. On 29 September 2018, she was crowned as the Miss Deaf World 2018 which was held in Prague, Czech Republic. She also became the first Israeli to win the Miss Deaf World contest.
