= Dian Inggrawati =

Indonesian beauty queen

- Born: Dian Inggrawati Soebangil; April 12, 1984 (age 42); Jakarta, Indonesia
- Height: 1.68 m (5 ft 6 in)
- Beauty pageant titleholder
- Hair color: black
- Eye color: brown
- Major competitions: Miss Deaf World 2011 (2nd Runner-up); Miss Deaf International 2012 (Top 5)

Dian Inggrawati Soebangil (born April 12, 1984) is an Indonesian beauty queen. She was appointed to represent Indonesia in Miss Deaf World 2011, in Prague, Czech Republic. She is the first and only deaf beauty queen from Indonesia to have placed as a finalist in any international beauty pageant.

== Miss Deaf World 2011 ==
Soebangil competed as one of the 38 finalists in the 11th edition of Miss Deaf World contest in 2011, held in Congress Hall Top Hotel, Prague, Czech Republic. She achieved the 2nd runner-up placement, only behind Ilaria Galbusera of Italy, who won the pageant, and Elena Korchagina of Russia, who placed as the 1st runner-up. The final event was held on July 8, 2011. She also performed Betawi traditional dance in the talent round on final night.

She was the first Indonesian to compete, and also the first Indonesian that made into the Top 3 in this pageant.

== Miss Deaf International 2012 ==
Dian Inggrawati represented Indonesia in Miss Deaf International 2012 held in Ankara, Turkey on July 27, 2012 and placed in the Top 5. This is the first and the highest achievement for Indonesia in Miss Deaf International pageant.

== Education ==
Soebangil is a graduate of the faculty of communication in University of Persada Indonesia Y.A.I, and graduated in 2010.
