= Vidisha Baliyan =

Indian model, beauty pageant contestant, and tennis player

- Born: Muzaffarnagar, Uttar Pradesh, India
- Education: Bachelor in Physical Education, Masters in Yoga, Masters in History
- Occupations: Beauty pageant titleholder, former tennis player, motivational speaker
- Known for: Miss Deaf World 2019, Miss Deaf India 2019, National Disability Award 2019, Founder of Spandan Welfare Society
- Parent(s): Vipin Kumar (Father); Dr. Deepshika (Mother)

Vidisha Baliyan is a former beauty pageant titleholder, retired tennis player, motivational speaker, and founder of the Spandan Welfare Society. She represented India at the 2017 Summer Deaflympics and also represented India at the 2019 Miss & Mister Deaf World contest. On 19 July 2019, she won the Miss Deaf World Contest and became the first ever Indian to be crowned as a Miss Deaf World.

== Early life ==
Baliyan was born with partial hearing impairment at birth. Her parents refused to send her to a special school despite medical advice. She attended the MN Public School in Muzaffarnagar for her primary education. She faced discrimination from the other students due to her deafness. She has completed her graduation in Physical Education from Noida. She has pursued her postgraduation studies in Yoga and History as well.

== Deaflympic career ==
She pursued her career by playing tennis at the national level. She most notably claimed two silver medals at the 2016 National Games before being called up to take part in the 2017 Summer Deaflympics, her first Deaflympic event. She competed in women's singles and doubles events at the 2017 Deaflympics. She was placed fifth in the women's doubles event. It is reported that Vidisha decided to retire from playing tennis, citing severe back injuries following the 2017 Summer Deaflympics.

== Pageantry ==
Baliyan decided to take part in the Miss Deaf India contest following her retirement from tennis. She was reported to have had training sessions in Greater Noida for over a year to participate in Miss Deaf India 2019. She eventually won the Miss Deaf India 2019 contest, which was held in Assam, Guwahati in February 2019. After emerging as Miss Deaf India, she qualified to take part in the Miss Deaf World 2019 contest and headed to South Africa. She also received the assistance from Wheeling Happiness Foundation, which is run by 2016 Summer Paralympics silver medalist Deepa Malik.

She was one of the many contestants to have participated in the Miss Deaf World contest and was crowned Miss Deaf World for the year 2019. Vidisha went on to become the first Indian to win the Miss Deaf World 2019.

=== Talks ===
Baliyan spoke about her life story at TedxJnec, and at TEDxYouth@AISG46.

== See also ==
- India at the Deaflympics
