= Sri Venkateswara College =

Constituent college of University of Delhi

- Motto: Satyaan pramaditavyam
- Motto in English: Truth Through Self-Education
- Type: Public (Central Government) (Maintenance: 95% UGC; 5% College revenue; also one-time grants for development from the trust on requirement basis)
- Established: 20 August 1961; 65 years ago (by Tirumala Tirupati Devasthanams)
- Academic affiliations: University of Delhi
- Principal: Vajala Ravi
- Students: 4500
- Location: Dhaula Kuan, South West Delhi; 28°35′19.68″N 77°10′4.15″E
- Campus: Urban, 15 acres, South Campus
- Calendar: Semester
- Nickname: Venky
- Website: www.svc.ac.in

Sri Venkateswara College is a constituent college of the University of Delhi established in 1961 in South West Delhi, India. It is managed by Tirumala Tirupati Devasthanams and UGC and awards degrees under the purview of the University of Delhi. The college offers courses both at the undergraduate level and the postgraduate level. Vocational courses and short-term add-on courses that serve as significant supplement to the academic profiles of the students are offered by the college. Admissions are done purely based on merit and as per the Delhi University norms. It is ranked 14th among colleges in India by NIRF as of 2022. Subsequently, in 2024 Outlook ranked it 6th in the Humanities stream, 9th in the Science stream and 13th in Commerce stream.

== History ==
It was founded under the Tirumala Tirupati Devasthanams (TTD) Trust, as a result of the efforts of Durgabai Deshmukh, who was a member of the constituent assembly of India and founder of the Andhra Education Society in Delhi (1948). She approached K. L. Rao (Member of Parliament) and C. Anna Rao (CEO of TTD), after realising the acute shortage of a degree-level college in the city. The primary objective of the college was to cater to the education needs of students from South India.

=== Foundation ===
The college started up in 1961 in a school building of the Andhra Education Society in Rouse Avenue (now Deen Dyal Uppadhyay Marg near ITO), South West Delhi district, with 271 students and 13 faculty members. The foundation stone of the present campus was laid on 20 August 1961 by Sarvepalli Radhakrishnan, former president of India (then vice-president). The college moved into its newly constructed campus at Dhaula Kuan, South West Delhi, on 25 August 1971. In August 2010, the college celebrated its golden anniversary.

=== Evolution ===
Sri Venkateswara College came into being through the vision of Durgabai Deshmukh, K. L. Rao and C. Anna Rao in 1961. Initially starting off as a BA pass college, it began by offering B.A. courses in Telugu, Tamil, Hindi and Sanskrit. Within few years of acquiring its new campus, and led by its principal V Krishnamoorthy, the college introduced honours courses in arts and science. In 1973 the University of Delhi recognised it as one of its constituent colleges, paving the way for future expansion. From its beginning with just language courses, the college now has academic departments in other disciplines: Economics, Mathematics and Statistics, English, Political Science, History, Botany, and Zoology. The Department of Chemistry which initially provided chemistry papers for other departments was permitted to conduct its own honours course in 1983. Honours courses in Physics (1993), Electronics (1987), and Biochemistry (1989) began. It is a fairly young college in comparison to others of the university which provide honours courses.

Infrastructure developments were undertaken starting from 2006 using fund accrued under CPE, Star College, OBC expansion fund, Golden Jubilee fund and TTD grants. The status of college with Potential for Excellence (UGC 2004) and Star College (DBT 2011) were awarded; CPE was withdrawn in 2011 because of lack of NAAC accreditation which is absent in all of Delhi colleges. Pass courses in BA, BSc, BCom, Life Science, Biological Science and Honours in Tamil and Telugu were discontinued in 2013.

== Campus ==
=== Facilities ===
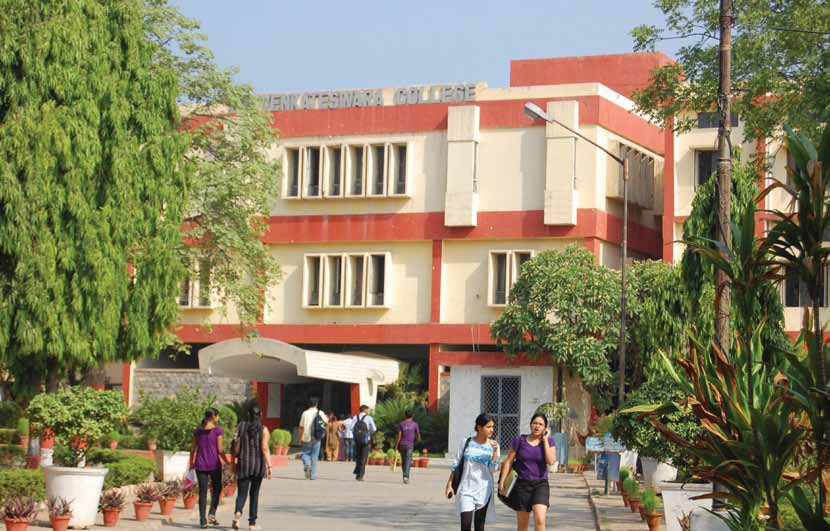
Main Building of Sri Venkateswara College

- Hostel: Since 2008, Sri Venkateswara College has an on-campus hostel consisting of two blocks, one each for boys and girls to accommodate 144 students.
- The Bioinformatics Center was established in 2006 to promote biology teaching through bioinformatics. It was funded initially by the Department of Biotechnology under the Biotechnology Information System (BTISnet) program. It is the first Bioinformatics Center established in the University of Delhi and North India for the benefit of undergraduate students.
- The college has facilities for sports. The cricket field in the college campus has host district level competitions. Modern and better lawn tennis and basketball facilities are under construction.
- An auditorium with a seating capacity of 800.
- A Seminar Hall with a seating capacity of 250 students
- The college has a library of over 1,20,000 books and is subscribed to over 75 journals and periodicals
- ICT Labs

== Organisation and administration ==
=== Governance ===
The college was established and is run by Tirumala Tirupati Devasthanams(TTD), a board which organises the temple of Tirupati in Andhra Pradesh. Public involvement in the affairs of the college is through nomination of people from various walks of public life to its Governing Body as per provisions of statute 30(1)(c)(i) of Delhi University Act, 1922. Management of various activities of the college is supervised by the Principal through designated committees. Monitoring of the affairs of the college is done by its Governing Body, Academic Council & Executive Council of the University of Delhi.

The Governing Body of the college consist of the following:

- Ten members nominated by the Tirumala Tirupati Devasthanams(TTD), one amongst them elected as chairman and another as treasurer.
- The principal of the college (ex-officio) member-secretary.
- Two members from the university (for two years).
- Two members of the teaching staff by rotation according to seniority (for two years),

=== Principals ===
- V Krishanamoorthy, 1973–1991
- A Sankara Reddy, 1994–2009.
- P Hemalatha Reddy, 2009–2020
- Prof. C. Sheela Reddy, 2021–2023
- Prof. Vajala Ravi, 2024–present

== Ranking ==
College rankings

General – India
- NIRF (Colleges) (2023): 13

It is ranked 13th across India by National Institutional Ranking Framework in 2023.

== Notable alumni ==
- Jayant Chaudhary, Minister of State (Independent Charge) For Ministry of Skill Development and Entrepreneurship (2024 - incumbent), Rajya Sabha MP from Uttar Pradesh.
- Rishabh Pant, Indian Cricketer.
- Sonam Wangchuk, Indian Army Colonel, Maha Vir Chakra.
- Navdeep Singh, Indian Paralympian, Gold Medallist at 2024 Summer Paralympics, Paris in Javelin throw F41.
- Tania Sachdev, International Chess Grandmaster.
- Ayush Badoni, Indian Cricketer.
- Gaurav Kapur, TV Host and Actor
- Prashant Raj Sachdev, Model and actor
- Raghu Ram, Television Star
- Nishtha Dudeja, Model
- Aditi Singh Sharma, Bollywood Singer
- Mona Vasu, Television Actress
- Sriti Jha, Television Actress
- Rashi Bunny, Actress
- Nishtha Dudeja, Model
- Sachin Gupta, Singer
- Amit Luthra Golfer, Arjuna Award
- Tejas Baroka, Indian Cricketer

== Student life ==
Students come from all over the country as well from outside India. Outstation students generally reside at student-friendly accommodations in Satya Niketan, Anand Niketan, Moti Bagh, Munirka, Naraina, South Extension and Lajpat Nagar. Due to its strategic location in the south of the capital city, a sizeable number of student is from south Delhi localities, Delhi Cantonment and Gurgaon.

Student elections are held as per the DUSU format every year.

=== NEXUS ===
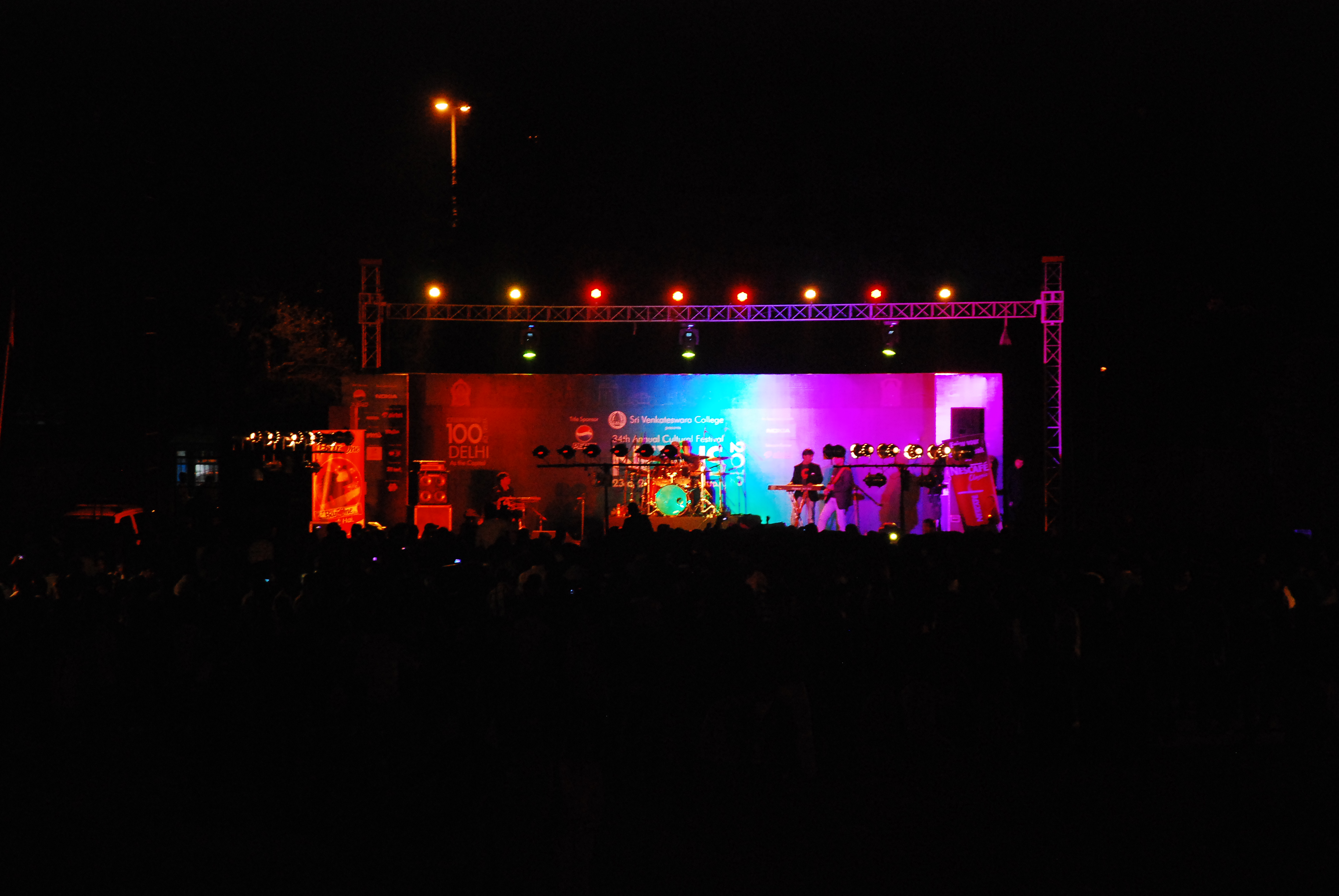
Celeb Show at NEXUS 2012

NEXUS, the annual inter-college cultural festival of Sri Venkateswara College, was founded in 1978. The three-day festival attracts students from all across the university. The USP of the festival are its professional shows, including the Rock Show and Celebrity Show. Apart from this it holds competitions in Dramatics, Dance, Music, Fine Arts, Literary etc. rock bands like Parikrama, Indian Ocean, Pentagram, Advaita, Euphoria etc. and celebrities like Kailash Kher, Sunidhi Chauhan, KK, Mohit Chauhan, Vishal Dadlani, Armaan Malik, Jazzy B, Sukhwinder Singh, Shankar Mahadevan etc. have performed at the festival. The festival is organised by Fine Arts Association(FAA) in collaboration with the Students' Union.

There are additional programmes like Venkateswara Swamy's Kalyanam and other poojas for Swami are done on a regular basis, and the prasadam is shared with students. There is an idol of Venkateswara Swamy in the college campus, which is worshipped regularly.

The Economics Association of Sri Venkateswara College has an annual Academic-cum-Cultural Exchange Program with universities from Sri Lanka and Bhutan, the first of its kind in the University of Delhi. The two day annual department fest of Political Science Department is INTROSPECT.
