= D. P. Singh (writer) =

Dr. D. P. Singh (nee Dr. Devinder Pal Singh), born 1956, is an Indo-Canadian scientist, educationist, author science fiction writer, Sikh theologian, and TV host. As a widely travelled person, mostly for his academic research, and promotion of science in developing countries, he has published about 100 research papers in Acoustics, Polymer Physics, Condensed Matter Physics and Material Science. Besides, he has published over 1000 general articles on the topics related to Science, Environment and Religion.

Due to his outstanding contributions for the cultivation of scientific temper and environmental awareness among people, the Peace on Earth Organization, Canada, in 2010, honored him with the "Life Time Achievement Award". Though he writes in English and Punjabi, his works have also been translated into Hindi, Shahmukhi, and Marathi languages.

== Early life ==
Born in 1956, at Hoshiarpur, Punjab, India, Devinder received M.Sc. (Physics) degree from Panjab University, Chandigarh, in 1978. Started his professional career at SGGS Khalsa College, Chandigarh, India. In 1986, received Ph.D. degree from Guru Nanak Dev University, Amritsar. Served several Higher Education institutions, as part of the Punjab Education Services, Govt. of Punjab, during 1980-2008. After joining Shivalik College, Nangal in 1980, he excelled in popular science communication in Punjabi and English languages, but later on focussed on Science fiction, environmental and theological writings.

== Career ==
After a 30-year career in education as an Associate Professor of Physics at Punjab Education Services, Govt. of Punjab, India, Dr. Singh moved to Canada in 2008. Herein, he founded an educational Center, dedicated to helping University/College/Senior Secondary students to achieve their academic dreams in the fields of Physical Sciences and Humanities. Since 2013, he has served as Director, and Educational Consultant to several academic institutions in GTA, Canada. During 2014-2020, he has worked as the Associate Dean at the International University of California, USA. He also worked as an Honorary Director to the Center for Understanding Sikhism, from late 2019 to early 2026, Mississauga, ON, Canada. He is currently working as a Professor at Arihanta Institute, San Jose, California, USA.

== Works ==
=== Physics research ===
With about 100 research papers in Physics and allied fields to his credit Dr. Singh has guided one dozen research students and supervised two M. Phil. theses. Besides, he established Acoustics Research Center, Mississauga, Canada to actively pursue his research interests in Acoustics. Having participated in about 50 conferences/ seminars within Canada and abroad, he is a member of several international research societies. In addition, he is the referee panel member of several reputed research journals of Canada, USA, Nigeria, and India.

=== Scientific literature ===
Besides publishing 20 books and about 1200 general articles on various aspects of science and technology, he has also translated 4 books from English to Punjabi.

=== Science fiction writings ===
In the genre of science fiction, Dr. Singh has authored/published two books for general readers, four books for children and about 45 stories, to date, in various newspapers and magazines of Canada, USA, Romania, India, and Pakistan in Punjabi, Hindi, and English.

=== Sikh Theology ===
From late 2019 to early 2026, as the Director, Center for Understanding Sikhism, Mississauga Canada, he played a vital role in the promotion of teaching and research in Sikh Theology in India and Canada. With six books, two booklets, and about 250 articles on Sikh theology to his credit, he has delivered about one dozen invited talks on ‘Sikh Religion and Philosophy’ at various educational institutions within India and Canada. Five of his articles have been included in different books edited by eminent Sikh scholars. He has reviewed thirteen books authored by eminent Sikh writers.

=== Media ===
Over 70 of his talks on Sikhism, science, and social topics have been telecast by Jhanjer TV, Sanjha Punjab TV, Channel Punjabi Toronto Dateline TV, Vision TV, and Hello Canada TV, Canada. He has also participated in the science programs of DD Punjabi, Doordarshan Jalandhar, Vision Punjab TV, Kharar, Punjab and Global Punjab TV, Chandigarh, India. Many of these talks are also available on Youtube. About 50 of his radio programs on science and religion have been broadcast by Ajj Di Awaz Radio, Desh Punjab Radio, Parvasi Radio, Punjabi Dunia, AVR Media Productions, Canada and All India Radio, Jalandhar, India.

== Awards ==
- 2011 "Excellent writing Award" by Ajj Di Awaz Radio & Daily Punjabi, Canada
- 2010 "Life Time Achievement Award" by Peace on Earth Organization, Canada
- 2006 "Lala Hardyal Memorial Award" for best Science Communication in mass media by Paryas Kala Manch, Nangal, India
- 2003 "ISWA SAMMAN" for longstanding contribution to the popularisation of science, by Indian Sc. Writers’Association, N.Delhi, India
- 2001 "Principal Trilochan Singh Bhatia (Children Literature and Gian Vigyan) Award", by Punjabi Sath, Lambrhan, Jalandhar, India
- 2000 "Dr. M. S. Randhawa" (Gian Sahit) Award for the book Vigyan Prapatian ate Masle, by LDP, Govt. of Punjab, India
- 1997 "Sarvotam Bal Sahit Pustak Purskar" for his book Robot, Manukh te Kudrat, by LDP, Govt. of Punjab, India
- 1994 "Hanibal Sahit Rattan Purskar" for his book C. V. Raman-Life and Times, by Sahit Rang Gathan (Sarang Lok), Chandigarh, India
- 1991 "Sarvotam Bal Sahit Pustak Purskar" for the book Satrang, by LDP, Govt. of Punjab, India

== Video links ==
- World Earth Day: Impacts of COVID 19 on the Environment of Earth
- Universal Relevance of Guru Nanak's Teachings
- Qudrat in Guru Nanak's Bani
- Environmental Teaching in Sikhism
- Aamne-Samne: Exclusive Interview
