= K. Y. Venkatesh =

Indian para-athlete

Personal information
- Nationality: Indian
- Born: Bengaluru, India
- Occupation: Para-athlete
- Height: 127 cm (4 ft 2 in)

Sport
- Country: India
- Disability: Yes

K. Y. Venkatesh is an Indian para-athlete and shot putter from Bengaluru, Karnataka, India. He won his first gold for India in the shot put in 1999 in Australia. In 1994, he represented India at the 1st International Paralympic Committee (IPC) Athletics World Championships in Berlin, Germany. He was awarded India's fourth highest civilian award the Padma Shri in 2021.

Venkatesh also holds a Limca Book of Records. He made a world record when he secured six medals in various sports at the fourth World Dwarf Games in 2005.

K. Y. Venkatesh won a silver medal for Badminton at the LG World Cup 2002 and 3 gold and 2 silver medals in shot put, discus throw and javelin throw at the Open Track and Field Championship 2004. He also won one gold medal, two silver medals and one bronze medal at the 2004 Swedish Open Track & Field Championship.

He bagged a gold medal in the hockey event, silver medals in football and basketball events and a bronze medal in the badminton event at the 2006 European Open Championships. He has also served as the Secretary of the Karnataka Para-Badminton Association for the Disabled. Venkatesh is suffering from Achondroplasia and his height is 4 ft 2 inch.

== Achievements ==
- Won a bronze medal at the 2012 Spanish Para-Badminton Tournament
- Won a gold medal in the discus throw and bronze medals in the javelin throw, badminton singles and doubles events of the 2009 World Dwarf Games
- Won bronze and gold medals at the badminton singles and doubles events of the 2008 Asian Paralympic Cup
- Won a gold medal in the hockey event, silver medals in football and basketball events and a bronze medal in the badminton event of the 2006 European Open Championships
- Won a gold medal in the discus throw and bronze medal in shot put, volleyball and badminton events of the 2005 Dwarf Olympics
- Won a silver medal at the 2004 Israel Open Badminton Championship
- Won 3 gold and 2 silver medals in shot put, discus throw and javelin throw at the 2004 Open Track and Field Championship
- Won a gold medal, 2 silver medals and a bronze medal at the 2004 Swedish Open Track & Field Championship
- Won a silver medal for India in the badminton event of the 2002 LG World Cup
- Won a gold medal in the shot put event at the 1999 Southern Cross Multi Disability Championship
- He is also the recipient of the Ekalavya and Karnataka Rajyotsava awards.

== Awards and recognition ==
On 26 January 2021, the Government of India conferred him India's fourth-highest civilian award the Padma Shri.
