= National Award for the Empowerment of Persons with Disabilities =

Highest civilian honour for persons with disabilities in India

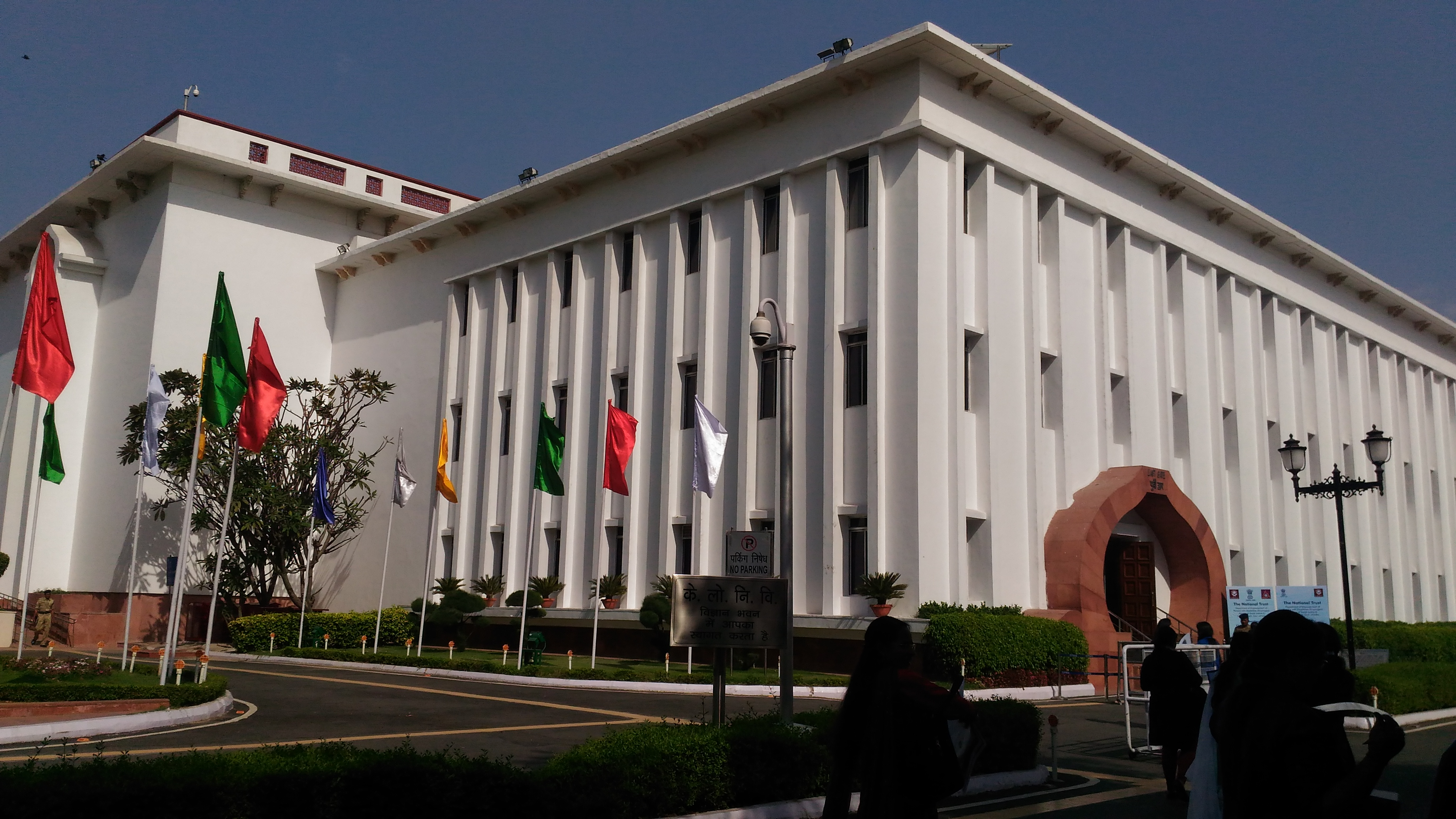
- Vigyan Bhavan, where the National Awards for the Empowerment of Persons with Disabilities are held annually
- Type: National civilian
- Location: Vigyan Bhawan, New Delhi
- Country: India
- Presented by: President of India
- Formerly called: National Award for the Welfare of the Handicapped; National Award for the Welfare of the People with Disabilities; National Award for the Welfare of People with Disabilities
- Established: 1969; 57 years ago
- First award: 1969
- Final award: 2023
- Website: socialjustice.nic.in

Precedence
- Next (higher): None

The National Award for the Empowerment of Persons with Disabilities is an award for persons with disabilities in India, widely considered the most prominent award in said category in the country. Established in 1969, it has been administered by the Indian government's Ministry of Social Justice and Empowerment.

== See also ==
- Ministry of Social Justice and Empowerment
