= Koi (Kuntipur) =

Village in Hoshiarpur district, Punjab, India

Koi (Kuntipur) ਕੋਈ (ਕੁੰਤੀਪੁਰ) Kuntipur
- Village
- Location within Punjab
- Coordinates: 31°48′55.86″N 75°49′59.01″E
- Country: India
- State: Punjab
- District: Hoshiarpur
- Tehsil: Dasuya

Area
  - Total: 902 ha (2,230 acres)
- Elevation: 239 m (784 ft)

Population (2011)
  - Total: 1,203

Literacy
  - Rate (2011): 79.2%
- Time zone: UTC+5:30 (IST)
- PIN: 144213
- STD code: 01886
- ISO 3166 code: IN-PB
- Scheduled Castes: 6.9% (83)
- Website: hoshiarpur.nic.in

Koi, also known by its traditional name Kuntipur, is a village located in Dasuya tehsil of Hoshiarpur district in the state of Punjab, India. The village sits at an elevation of 239 metres (784 ft) above sea level within the Shivalik foothills region of northern Punjab. It is governed through a gram panchayat and falls within the Urmar assembly constituency, which forms part of the Hoshiarpur parliamentary constituency.

== Etymology ==
The village's historical name, Kuntipur, is linked by local tradition to Kunti, the mother of the Pandavas in the Sanskrit epic Mahabharata. According to accounts preserved in the broader Dasuya–Kamahi Devi area, the Pandavas are said to have passed through the Shivalik forests of this region during their thirteenth year of exile (agyatvas)—an incognito period—before travelling to the kingdom of Raja Virata, identified with present-day Dasuya. Local tradition further holds that a banyan tree at Kuntipur marks the location where the Pandavas are said to have concealed their weapons during their period of disguise. The settlement came to be named Kuntipur after the association with Mata Kunti, and over time this contracted into the modern name Koi.

These traditions form part of a wider regional layer of Mahabharata-associated folklore. The official website of Hoshiarpur district notes that "the legends associate several places in the district with Pandavas" and that Dasuya is mentioned in the epic as the seat of Raja Virata, in whose service the Pandavas lived during their exile. The district tourism page similarly records that Hoshiarpur's history "reaches back to the Mahabharata… with various sites here linked to its valiant heroes, the Pandavas."

== Geography ==
Koi is situated approximately 45 km from the district headquarters at Hoshiarpur and 23 km from the sub-district headquarters at Dasuya. The state capital Chandigarh is approximately 176 km to the south. The village covers a total geographical area of 902 hectares, and its census village code is 030952. The nearest town for major economic activity is Gardhiwala.

Neighbouring villages include Sansarpur (approximately 1 km), Dehrian (2 km), San Chak (2 km), Sangwal (2 km), and Kalowal (2 km). The nearest urban centres are Dasuya (approximately 23 km), Talwara (approximately 20 km), Urmar Tanda (approximately 23 km), and Mukerian (approximately 26 km).

The village is connected to the regional road network via National Highway 503A and National Highway 3 (India, new numbering)|National Highway 3.

== Demographics ==
According to the 2011 Census of India, Koi had a total population of 1,203 persons, comprising 608 males and 595 females, giving a sex ratio of 978 females per 1,000 males. The village comprised 259 households.

Children in the age group 0–6 years numbered 135, of whom 48 (35.6%) were girls. The scheduled caste population stood at 83 persons, constituting approximately 6.9% of the total population. No scheduled tribe population was recorded at the time of the census.

The overall literacy rate was 79.2%, with 953 persons recorded as literate; 469 of these were women. The working population—those engaged in economic activity—constituted approximately 18.5% of the total population.

The official and predominant language of the village is Punjabi.

== Administration ==
Koi functions as its own gram panchayat, as recorded in 2009 panchayat statistics. The gram panchayat is headed by an elected representative known as the sarpanch. The village falls within the Urmar assembly constituency of Punjab, which in turn is part of the Hoshiarpur parliamentary constituency. The PIN code for the village is 144213, with the postal head office at Bhanowal.

== Education ==
The principal educational institution within the village is Shaheed Vijay Singh Government High School (SVSGHS Koi), a government-run secondary school. Higher educational institutions are available in the nearby towns of Dasuya, Gardhiwala, and Hoshiarpur.

== Religious sites ==
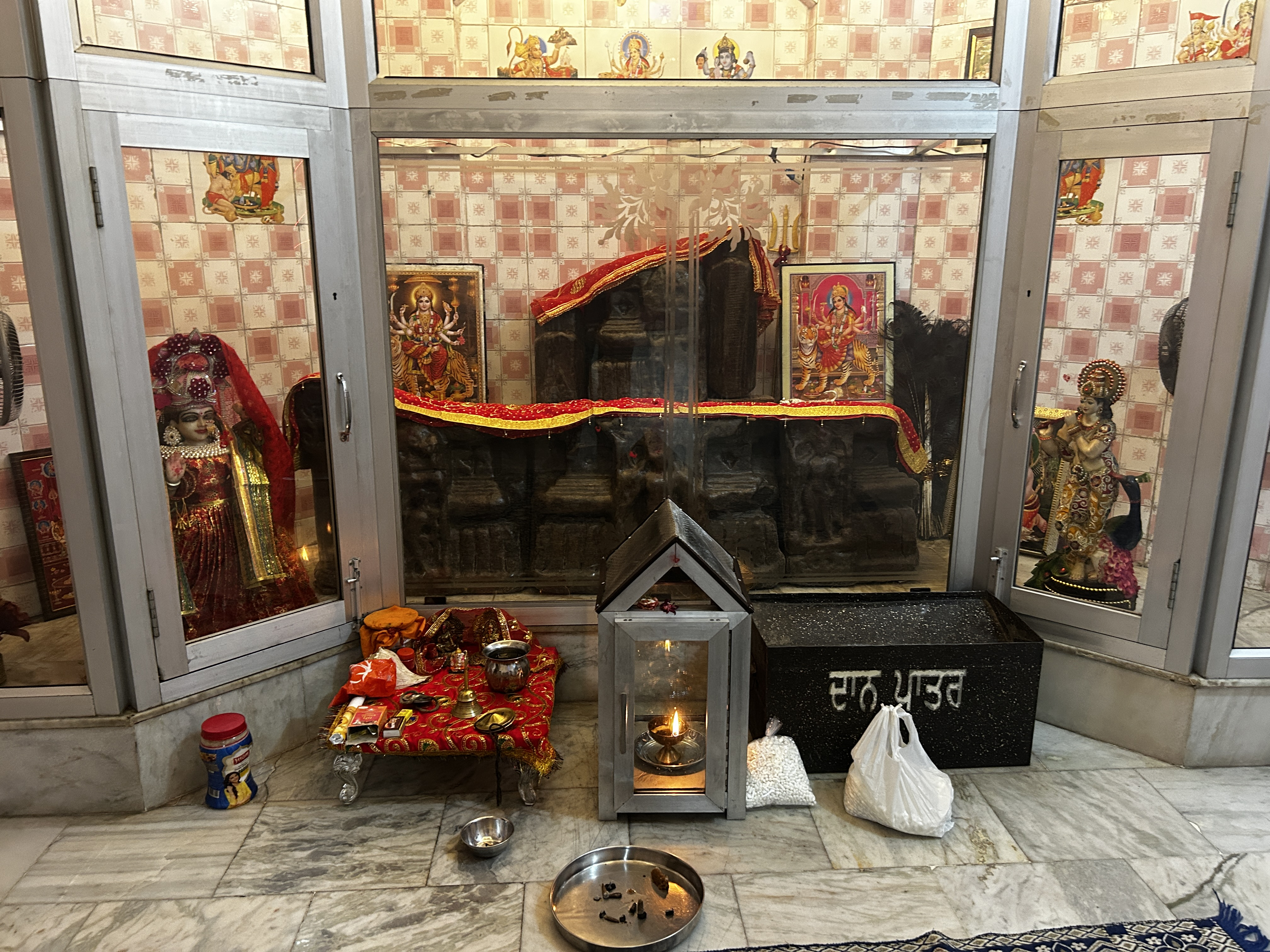
Inside View of Kuntipur Mata Temple, Koi

The Kunti Mata Mandir and the Mata Kunti Devi Temple, both situated near the village, are associated with the local tradition linking the area to Mata Kunti of the Mahabharata. A centre of the Radha Soami Satsang Beas is located approximately 0.6 km from the village, within the Hoshiarpur–Garhdiwala corridor. The broader region, which lies at the foothills of the Shivaliks, has historically been a site of Hindu temple worship and pilgrimage, a character reflected in the nearby Kamakshi Devi (Kamahi Devi) temple complex in the Dasuya forest division.

== Transport ==
The village has no railway station within 10 km. The nearest rail connections are at Dasuya railway station (approximately 16 km) and Tanda Urmar railway station (approximately 25 km). Bus services are accessible at stops along the Dasuya–Kamahi Devi Road, approximately 5–6 km from the village.

The nearest airports are Pathankot Airport (approximately 53 km), Gaggal Airport near Dharamshala (approximately 77 km), and Sri Guru Ram Dass Jee International Airport at Amritsar (approximately 106 km).

== See also ==
- Hoshiarpur district
- Dasuya
- Shivalik Hills
- Mahabharata
- Pandava
