= Meghowal =

Coordinates: 31°28′N 75°49′E

Meghowal village, Doaba, Punjab is located near Mahilpur, Hoshiarpur, Punjab, India. The village has an elementary school, as well as government-run primary and regional high school. 3 kilometers away from Totumazara to east side.Pind Road, Meghowal, Punjab 146109, India

== Background ==
Meghowal is a small village near Mahilpur in the Hoshiarpur district of Punjab, India. The village is known for their bravery. Today, Megowal is a thriving village with a strong sense of community and a rich cultural heritage. Gurudoare Sant Baba Bhai Ajeet Singh Ji situated in center of village.

- Gurudwara Shaheed Singhan.
- Mandir Raja Bharthari Ji.
