= Bora, India =

Bora
- village
- Location in Punjab, India Bora (India)
- Coordinates: 31°12′1.38″N 76°11′30.28″E
- Country: India
- State: Punjab
- District: Hoshiarpur

Languages
  - Official: Punjabi
- Time zone: UTC+5:30 (IST)

Bora is a village in the Hoshiarpur district of Punjab, India.

== Location ==
Bora is located 5 kilometres (3.1 mi) east of Garshankar. It is situated on the Garhshankar - Sri Anand pur Sahib Road.

== History ==
In the 19th century, between 1800 and 1820 AD, Shri Mahant Ram, a Digpal Brahmin, came from Garhi Mansowal and purchased or occupied some land. As the time passed, people from nearby villages started to come there, and Mahant Ram started selling plots to those people, becoming wealthy in the process. According to the caste norms of the time, Brahmins occupied the center of the developing town, while peasants occupied the east side of the village, and lower castes, the north side of the village.

=== Etymology ===
The village was named for the prevalence of banyan trees ("boharh" in Punjabi) in the area. The banyan trees have since been cut down.

== Culture ==
=== Festivals ===
Bora celebrates all Hindu and Sikh festivals, including Diwali, Holi, Gurpurab, and Raksha Bandhan, but Janamastami is the most popular festival in the village and is celebrated with great pomp and show by Hindus and Sikhs. On this day Sri Mahakali temple is decorated and the goddess Mahakali is worshipped with prasad prepared by the temple administrators and offered to the goddess.

In the 19th century, there was great confusion among the villagers regarding which day Mahakali should be worshipped on. The people of the Digpal gotra suggested that the holy ceremony should be done on the day of "Janamashtami".

=== Houses of worship ===
Bora is home to several temples:

- Sri Mahakali Temple
- Sri Sai Baba Temple (Gugga Zahir Peer)
- Sri Gugga Marhi Temple
- Shivalya (Shiv Mandir)
- Do Lathian Wala Mandir (Shivalya)
- Bagge Da Mandir

There is also a Sikh gurudwara named Gurudwara Chhevi Patshahi Sri Guru Hargobind Sahib Ji.
