= Bassi Kalan =

- Village
- Location in Punjab, India Location in India
- Coordinates: 31.448°N 76.003°E
- Country: India
- State: Punjab
- District: Hoshiarpur

Population
  - Total: 2,356

Languages
  - Official: Punjabi
- Time zone: UTC+5:30 (IST)
- PIN: 146102
- Telephone code: 1884

Bassi Kalan is a village in India, 12 kilometres from the district capital Hoshiarpur, near the Himachal Pradesh state border. It is situated in the Hoshiarpur district of Punjab.

Saido Patti (1 km), Mehina (1 km), Parsowal (2 km), Chabewal (2 km), Rajni Devi (2 km) are nearby villages. Mahadev Temple is 2 km away from the village.

The village has a dispensary clinic, telephone exchange and post office, a primary school, Government Senior Secondary School, and Lala Lajpat Rai Siksha Kender School. The Delhi-Chandigarh road also passes through here. There is a temple of Mata Dineshwari in the village where Jagran is held every year on 28 May. Another ancient temple here is known as Bodi.

== History ==
Siege of Bassi Kalan
- Part of Mughal-Sikh Wars
| Date | 7 March 1703 |
| Location | Bassi Kalan |
| Result | Sikh Victory |

Belligerents
| Khalsa (Sikhs) | Mughal Empire |

Commanders and leaders
| Sahibzada Ajit Singh; Bhai Udai Singh; Bhai Karam Singh † | Jabar Jang Khan (POW) |

Strength
| 100 | Unknown |

Casualties and losses
| Unknown | Unknown |

A skirmish was fought between the Sikh forces led by Sahibzada Ajit Singh and the Mughal forces led by Jabar Khan.

=== Background ===
A Brahmin appeared in the Guru's court and with a stentorian invocation for his assistance against a group of Pathans, whom he had claimed forcibly abducted his bride at Bassi Kalan. The Brahmin, who was named Devaki Das, made a petition to Guru Gobind Singh, who assigned Sahibzada Ajit Singh and Bhai Udai Singh the task of recovering the lady. He took a force of 100 horsemen with him.

=== Battle ===
Upon arriving the Sikhs put siege on the village. They successfully rescued the bride.

=== Aftermath ===
The Brahmin and his wife apparently had been overcome with a keen sense of gratefulness towards the Sikh guru for his assistance. They unceasingly praised Ajit Singh in-particular. Jabar Khan was taken prisoner and received a punishment.

=== Gurdwaras ===
Five gurdwaras were built in order to remember the battle:

- Gurdwara Sahibzada Ajit Singh - Where the clash took place
- Gurdwara Sahib Shahidan, Ladhewal - Where Sikhs were cremated
- Gurdwara Shahidan (Harian Vailan) - Where Sikhs were cremated
- Gurdwara Baba Ajit Singh, Baddon - Where Bhai Karam Singh was cremated
- Gurdwara Chukhandi Sahib - Where Sikhs were cremated

== See also ==
- Nihang
- Martyrdom and Sikhism
