= Unchi Bassi =

Settlement in Punjab, India

Coordinates: 31°52′N 75°39′E

Unchi Bassi is a large village in Hoshiarpur district in the state of Punjab, India. It is 6 km away from Dasuya city and is a large base for military.

== Geography ==
The village is located at an average elevation of 240 metres (790 feet) from sea level.

== Location ==
Unchi Bassi is located on the National Highway 44 (new) NH-1A (old) which connects Jammu and Kashmir to rest of India. It is located in the district Hoshiarpur of Punjab state in India. The city is well connected with rail and road with rest of India. Major cities in the vicinity of Unchi Bassi are Hoshiarpur (48 km), Jalandhar (65 km), Gurdaspur (36 km), Amritsar (93 km) and Pathankot (52).

== Military Area and other features ==
It is large ground of military zone. One army school, CSD canteen & ECHS clinic is also located there. Dasuya - Mukeria Channel also flows through it. The village includes one hydro power station. Unchi Bassi comes under post office of village Lamin.
