= Nagal Kurud =

Village in India

Nangal Kurud is a village of Bains (a clan of jatts) in Punjab, India. It is in Hoshiarpur District near Mahilpur.
