= Odhra =

Odhra (Odrah)
- Village
- Location in Punjab, India Odhra (Odrah) (India)
- Coordinates: 31.82°N 75.68°E
- Country: India
- State: Punjab
- District: Hoshiarpur

Government
  - Type: Gram panchayat
  - Sarpanch: Sukhvinder Kaur

Area
  - Total: 2 km^{2} (0.77 sq mi)
- Elevation: 240 m (790 ft)

Population (2011)030975 (census code)
  - Total: 600
  - Density: 300/km^{2} (780/sq mi)

Languages
  - Official: Punjabi
- Time zone: UTC+5:30 (IST)
- PIN: 144205
- Telephone code: 01883
- Vehicle registration: PB21
- Sex ratio: 1000: 1000 ♂/♀
- Website: mcdasuya.com

Odhra (also spelled as Odrah) is a village in the Dasua subdivision of the Hoshiarpur district in Punjab, India.

== Geography and Demographics ==
Odhra is located at 31.810269°N 75.693571°E. It has an average elevation of 240 metres (787 feet) from sea level. The village has 108 hectares of area with 128 households. The village has 0% forest coverage and 1% wasteland used for discarding household waste and animal carcasses. Water bodies cover 0.5% of the total land and comprise a natural pond, canal, and seasonal rivulet. The total population of Odhra is 600 people with an equal number of males and females. There are 12% of people under the age of 6 with 53% males and 47% females. The total scheduled caste population is 507 (85%) and the gender ratio is 49% males vs 51% females. Total literates in the village are 79% (82% males and 76% females). In Odhra 5% of the population is below the poverty line according to Indian government guidelines.

== Administration ==
A village panchayat consists of an elected sarpanch (head) and five panchs (members) governs Odhra. There are five wards in the village.

== Demographics ==
According to the 2011 census of India, Odhra had a population of 600 across 128 households, with a sex ratio of 1,000 females per 1,000 males. Children (aged 0–6) comprised 12% of the population. Scheduled Castes form the majority at 85% (507 individuals). Literacy rate is 79% overall (82% male, 76% female). The village is governed by a gram panchayat with five wards, led by sarpanch Sukhvinder Kaur (as of recent records).

== Economy and Infrastructure ==
The economy is agrarian, focused on crops like wheat, rice, and sugarcane. About 5% of residents live below the poverty line. Odhra is connected by metaled roads to nearby villages (e.g., Jhalota, Terkiana) and Dasua (5–7 km away), which provides rail and highway access to cities like Hoshiarpur (46 km), Jalandhar (58 km), and Amritsar (93 km). The postal code is 144205, and the telephone code is 01883.
