= Tahli, Dasuya =

Tahli
- Village
- Country: India
- State: Punjab
- District: hoshiarpur

Languages
  - Official: Punjabi
- Time zone: UTC+5:30 (IST)
- PIN: 144304
- Telephone code: 1821

Tahli, also named Khokharan, is a village 5 km from Begowal. It is under Dasuya, a tehsil in the city Hoshiarpur of Indian state of Punjab. Numberdar of the village is Sardar Jarnail Singh.

== Transportation ==
Tahli lies on the edge of beas river . It is near begowal-tanda Road. The nearest Railway station to this village is Tanda Railway station about 16 km from the village. Begowal is The closest town to Tahli . People can use auto to reach Then can use buses to travel to reach different destinations.

== History ==
Before partition Muslim khokher Rajputs were main land owners here. Chohdri Ata Mehmood khan was zaildar of this area.

Gurdwara Tahli Sahib made in the memory of Baba Shri Chand is the main attraction for religious travellers.
