= Dhol Baha =

Dholbaha
- Village
- Location in Punjab, India Dholbaha (India)
- Coordinates: 31.7364°N 75.8737°E
- Country: India
- State: Punjab
- District: Hoshiarpur
- Elevation: 239 m (784 ft)
- Demonym: Dholbahia

Languages
  - Official: Punjabi
  - Other spoken: Hindi
- Time zone: UTC+5:30 (IST)
- PIN: 144206
- ISO 3166 code: IN-PB
- Vehicle registration: PB 07

Dholbaha is a village of the district Hoshiarpur in Punjab, India. Dholbaha is an archaeological site which is known for the discovery of stone sculptures, architectural fragments, fossil remains, and stone tools recovered from the Shivalik foothills region.

== Geography and history ==
Dholbaha is located in the Shivalik foothills, a geographically significant zone known for sedimentary formations and erosion patterns that preserve archaeological material. The surrounding region of Hoshiarpur has yielded a range of antiquities including prehistoric stone tools and fossil remains, as well as later cultural materials associated with early historic and medieval periods.

Archaeological material from Dholbaha reflects multiple layers of occupation or use. Stone tools and fossil remains are associated with prehistoric activity in the broader Shivalik region, while carved stone sculptures and architectural fragments suggest the presence of structured religious activity during the early medieval period (c. 8th–11th century CE). These sculptures are stylistically linked to North Indian temple art traditions.

== Material findings and preservation ==
Archaeological material from Dholbaha
Category	Description	Period (approx.)	Current status
Stone tools	Lithic artifacts from Shivalik deposits	Prehistoric	Documented in regional archaeological records
Fossil remains	Fossilized material from sedimentary layers	Prehistoric	Preserved in museum collections
Sculptures	Sandstone Hindu iconographic sculptures	c. 8th–11th century CE	Archaeological Museum, Hoshiarpur
Architectural fragments	Carved stone temple components	Early medieval	Evidence of religious structures
Religious artifacts	Fragmentary iconographic remains	Early medieval–medieval	Found in surrounding region

Artifacts recovered from Dholbaha are primarily housed in the Archaeological Museum, Hoshiarpur, which serves as the main repository for archaeological material from the region. The collection includes sculptures, architectural fragments, and prehistoric material representing the cultural sequence of the Shivalik foothills.

== Conservation and research status ==
Dholbaha has been documented as an archaeologically significant site in Hoshiarpur district and is noted for discoveries dating from prehistoric to early medieval periods. A substantial number of artifacts recovered from the area, including fossils, stone tools, sculptures, and architectural fragments, are preserved in the Archaeological Museum, Hoshiarpur. Records in the National Mission on Monuments and Antiquities (NMMA) database also document antiquities from Dholbaha preserved in museum collections.

== Census data ==
Particulars	Total	Male	Female
Total No. of Houses	579		
Population	2,738	1,384	1,354
Child (0-6)	332	179	153
Schedule Caste	456	245	211
Schedule Tribe	0	0	0
Literacy	83.46 %	86.56 %	80.35 %
Total Workers	845	639	206
Main Worker	617	0	0
Marginal Worker	228	91	137
