= Nangal Thathal =

Nangal Thathal is a village in the Hoshiarpur district of Punjab, India. It is 31 km from Hoshiarpur city. Many young men from the village engage in agriculture or are enlisted in the army.
