= Chohal =

- Census town
- Location in Punjab, India Chohal (India)
- Coordinates: 31.6122°N 75.9655°E
- Country: India
- State: Punjab
- District: Hoshiarpur

Population (2001)
  - Total: 7,433

Languages
  - Official: Punjabi
- Time zone: UTC+5:30 (IST)

Chohal is a census town in Hoshiarpur district in the state of Punjab, India.

== Demographics ==
As of the 2001 Indian census, Chohal has a population of 7,433, with 59% being male and 41% female. Chohal has an average literacy rate of 71%, higher than the national average of 59.5%; with male literacy of 78% and female literacy of 62%. 16% of the population is under 6 years of age.
