= Dagham =

Village in Punjab, India

- Village
- Location in Punjab, India Dagham (India)
- Coordinates: 31.2014°N 76.107°E
- Country: India
- State: Punjab
- District: Hoshiarpur

Government
  - Type: Panchayat raj
  - Body: Gram panchayat
- Elevation: 254 m (833 ft)

Population (2011)
  - Total: 2,174
- Sex ratio 1119/1055 ♂/♀

Languages
  - Official: Punjabi
- Time zone: UTC+5:30 (IST)
- PIN: 144527
- ISO 3166 code: IN-PB

Dagham also spelled Dagam, is a village in Garhshankar tehsil of the Hoshiarpur district of Punjab State, India. It is located 43 kilometers (26.72 miles) away from the district headquarter Hoshiarpur and 97.0 kilometers (60.27 miles) from the state capital Chandigarh. The village is administrated by a Sarpanch, an elected representative of the village.

== Demography ==
As of the 2011 census of India, Dagham has a total number of 468 households and population of 2174 of which 1119 are male and 1055 are female. The literacy rate is 74.1%.

The population of people from Schedule Caste is 1333 or 61.32% of the total population in Dagham. The town does not have any Schedule Tribe population so far.

== Education ==
The schools are located in the Garhshankar block, and are managed by the Department of education.

The village has a Punjabi medium, co-educational Government Primary School. The school consists of grades from 1 to 5. The school was established in 1959. Likewise, a Government Middle School, which consists of grades from 6 to 8, was established in 1977.

The village has an English medium, co-educational Private High School called K.C.Gloval High School Dagham which consists of grades from 1 to 8. It was established in 2013.

== Landmarks ==
Gurdwara Singh Sabha, Gurudwara Shaheedan Singhan, Dhan Dhan Guru Ravidas Ji Maharaj Gurudwara Central, and Jagat Guru Ravidas Ji Gurudwara Kupawali are religious sites in the village.

== See also ==
- List of villages in India
