= Khanaura =

- village
- Location in Punjab, India Khanaura (India)
- Coordinates: 31.393154°N 75.8166182°E
- Country: India
- State: Punjab
- District: Hoshiarpur

Area
  - Total: 2.7 km^{2} (1.0 sq mi)
- Elevation: 296 m (971 ft)

Population (2001)
  - Total: 2,714
  - Density: 1,000/km^{2} (2,600/sq mi)

Languages
  - Official: Punjabi
- Time zone: UTC+5:30 (IST)
- Vehicle registration: PB-07-

Khanaura is a village in the Hoshiarpur district of Punjab, India.

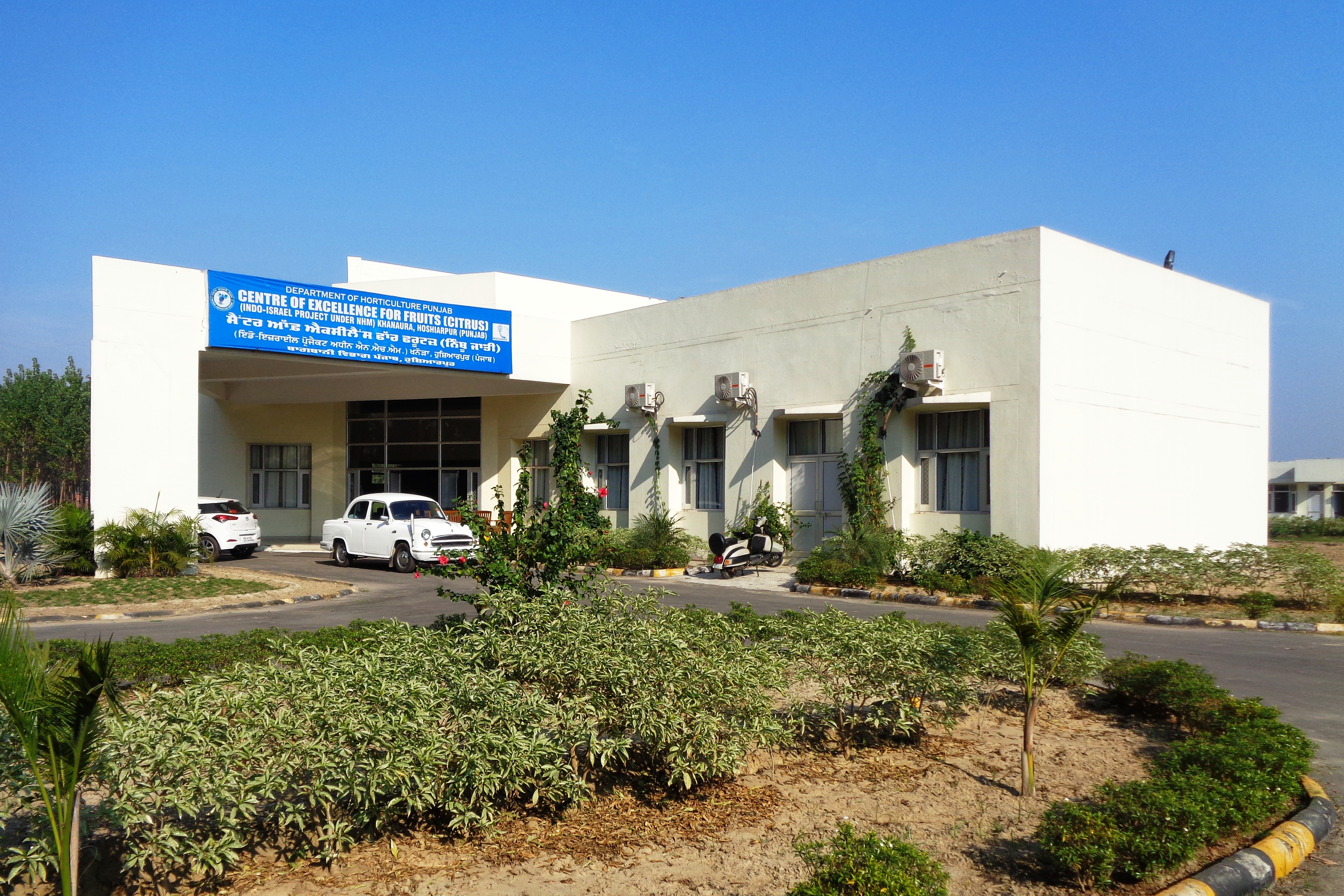
CENTRE OF EXCELLENCE FOR FRUITS, KHANAURA, DISTRICT HOSHIARPUR

== History ==
Khanaura is a pre-1947 Muslim village. It has Muslim graves well looked after from pre-1947 times.

== Population ==
According to Census 2011, Khanaura has a population of 2,714, of which 1434 are males while 1,280 are females.

Most of the villagers are from Schedule Caste. Schedule Caste (SC) constitutes 55.01% of total population. The village currently doesn't have any Schedule Tribe (ST) population.
