= Chattowal =

Coordinates: 31.72225°N 75.67833°E

Chattowal is a small village approximately 7 km from the city of Tanda in district Hoshiarpur, Punjab, India. Its tehsil is Dasuya. Its current Sarpanch is Smt. Naranjan Kaur.
