= Singriwala =

Singriwala Singriwal
- village
- Location in Punjab, India Singriwala (India)
- Coordinates: 31.5111°N 75.8662°E
- Country: India
- State: Punjab
- District: Hoshiarpur

Languages
  - Official: Punjabi
- Time zone: UTC+5:30 (IST)
- Vehicle registration: PB-
- Coastline: 0 kilometres (0 mi)

Singriwala is a village in Hoshiarpur district, in Punjab, India.

== History ==
As the name indicates itself Singh+Garhi+Wala the fort of Sikhs in 16th century So called Singriwala later on. Singriwala is a medium size village located in Hoshiarpur Tehsil of Hoshiarpur district, Punjab with total 376 families residing. The Singriwala village has population of 1800 of which 903 are males while 897 are females as per Population Census 2011.

In Singriwala village population of children with age 0-6 is 188 which makes up 10.44% of total population of village. Average Sex Ratio of Singriwala village is 993 which is higher than Punjab state average of 895. Child Sex Ratio for the Singriwala as per census is 918, higher than Punjab average of 846.

Singriwala village has higher literacy rate compared to Punjab. In 2011, literacy rate of Singriwala village was 87.84% compared to 75.84% of Punjab. In Singriwala Male literacy stands at 91.93% while female literacy rate was 83.77%.

As per constitution of India and Panchyati Raaj Act, Singriwala village is administrated by Sarpanch (Head of Village) who is elected representative of village. Singriwala Pin code is 146022 and postal head office is Piplanwala.

Haiderwal (1 km), Dagana Kalan (2 km), Khalwana (2 km), Fatehgarh Niara (2 km), Korangna (2 km) are the nearby Villages to Singriwala. Singriwala is surrounded by Hoshiarpur-Ii Tehsil towards East, Adampur Tehsil towards west, Bhogpur Tehsil towards west, Bhunga Tehsil towards North .

Also, as this village is on the outskirts of Hoshiarpur City and Chandigarh Road Bypass pass from this village.

From 1950 to 1996, Singriwala was renowned for its Talliyan (ਟੱਲੀਆਂ)—finely crafted brass bells produced by melting scrap metal and other alloys and meticulously shaped by hand by the master craftsman (ਠਠਿਆਰ) Sudh Singh. Members of that generation, including those who later settled in Canada, the United States, and other countries abroad, continue to recall the distinctive, sharp, and melodious sound of the Talliyan (ਟੱਲੀਆਂ). This exceptional craftsmanship brought widespread recognition to the village throughout Punjab, as no other craftsman of the period was able to match the quality and excellence of these products..

Freedom fighters from Singriwala have also contributed to the independence of India. Names include Harbaksh Singh Dhami S/O Hajara Singh and his brother Rattan Singh Dhami S/O Hajara Singh.
