= Nurpur Jattan =

- Village
- Location in Punjab, India Nurpur Jattan (India)
- Coordinates: 31.258713°N 76.037015°E
- Country: India
- State: Punjab
- District: Hoshiarpur

Government
  - Type: Panchayati raj (India)
  - Body: Gram panchayat

Population (2011)
  - Total: 763
- Sex ratio 401/362♂/♀

Languages
  - Official: Punjabi
  - Other spoken: Hindi
- Time zone: UTC+5:30 (IST)
- PIN: 144531
- Telephone code: 01884
- ISO 3166 code: IN-PB
- Vehicle registration: PB-24
- Website: hoshiarpur.gov.in

Nurpur Jattan is a village in Hoshiarpur district of Punjab State, India. It is located 35 kilometres (22 mi) from Hoshiarpur, which is both district and sub-district headquarters of Nurpur Jattan. This village comes under mahilpur police station and garhshanker (tehsil). Sabka sarpanch was sartaj singh sangra and now ajit singh Pannu elected as a sarpanch in recent election. This village is administrated by a Sarpanch, who is an elected representative.nurpur jattan has two sikh temples and a religious place which is known as bhagat charn dass ji. A fair held on every year in october in memory of bhagat charan daas ji. The village comprises an area of 208.54 hectares.

== Demography ==
According to the report published by Census India in 2011, Nurpur Jattan has total number of 157 houses and population of 763 of which include 401 males and 362 females. 568 persons were counted as literate, representing a literacy rate of 74.4%, slightly below the state average of 75.84%. The population of children under the age of 6 years is 55 (32 males and 23 females), which is 7.21% of total population of Nurpur Jattan.

== Population data ==
Particulars	Total	Male	Female
Total No. of Houses	157	-	-
Population	763	401	362
Child (0-6)	55	32	23
Schedule Caste	132	66	66
Schedule Tribe	0	0	0
Literacy	80.23 %	81.57 %	78.76 %
Total Workers	226	191	35
Main Worker	214 0	0	
Marginal Worker	12	4	8

== Air travel connectivity ==
The closest airport to the village is Sri Guru Ram Dass Jee International Airport.
