= Argowal =

Village in Punjab, India

- Village
- Interactive map of Argowal
- Coordinates: 31.750°N 75.736°E
- Country: India
- State: Punjab
- District: Hoshiarpur

Population
  - Total: 2,082
- Time zone: UTC+5.30 (India Standard Time)

Argowal is a village in Hoshiarpur district, Punjab, India.
