= Todarpur =

Village in Garhshanker tehsil, Hoshiarpur district, Punjab, India

Todarpur Urf Theh Pachrali is a village in the Garhshanker tehsil within the Hoshiarpur district of Punjab state, India.

== Location ==
It is located approximately 30 km from Hoshiarpur, 25km from Phagwara and 125 km from the state capital of Chandigarh. It hails in Garhshankar tehsil. Nearby Cities are Hoshiarpur, Phagwara, Mahilpur, Garhshankar. It Shares its boundary with villages Jalwehra, Nangla, Ajnoha, Nadalon, Panjour, Cheta, Wahid, Malikpur And Nasirabad.

== History and demographics ==
The village was founded by brothers Chaudry Dullah Gujjar and Chaudry Phulla Gujjar (given names Abdullah and Luttfullah respectively). Their children migrated to western Punjab in 1947 on partition, living in districts Faisalabad (Chak no.467 GB Samundri), Sahiwal and Pakpattan.

A large proportion of the population consists of Singh families migrated from Faisalabad (formerly Lyallpur) Pakistan in 1947. Today, Some common surnames of the families living in this village are Minhas, Parmar, Janjua, Saini, Badhan. The local language is Punjabi.

== Features and facilities ==
The village's main entry point is a large gate on the Jalwehra side.

Its primary source of irrigation is a tube well. Other older wells exist intact to this day. There is a Government High School located on Cheta Rd having well educated staff and good study environment, while in the centre of the village lies the tomb of Baba Mirze Shah, a venerated Sufi saint. Other notable resting places include the graves of the founding Chaudry brothers, and the grave of one of their sons, Chaudry Karam Baksh Zaildar. Children of Chaudry Karam Baksh are landlords in District Sahiwal, Punjab, Pakistan.

The assigned PIN code is 144404 and the postal head office is located in Ajnoha in Hoshiarpur.

== Gallery ==
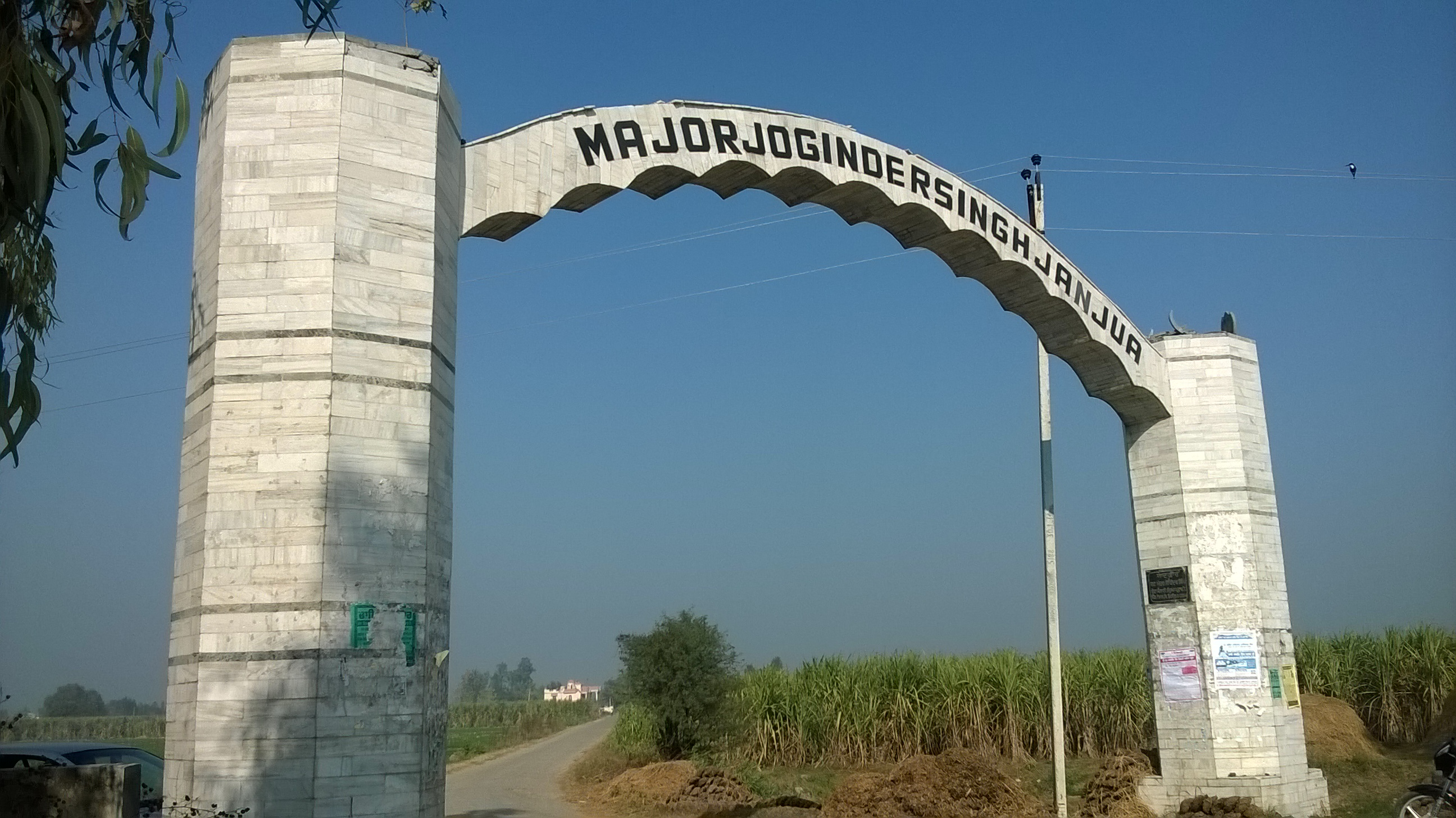
The Gate of Todarpur

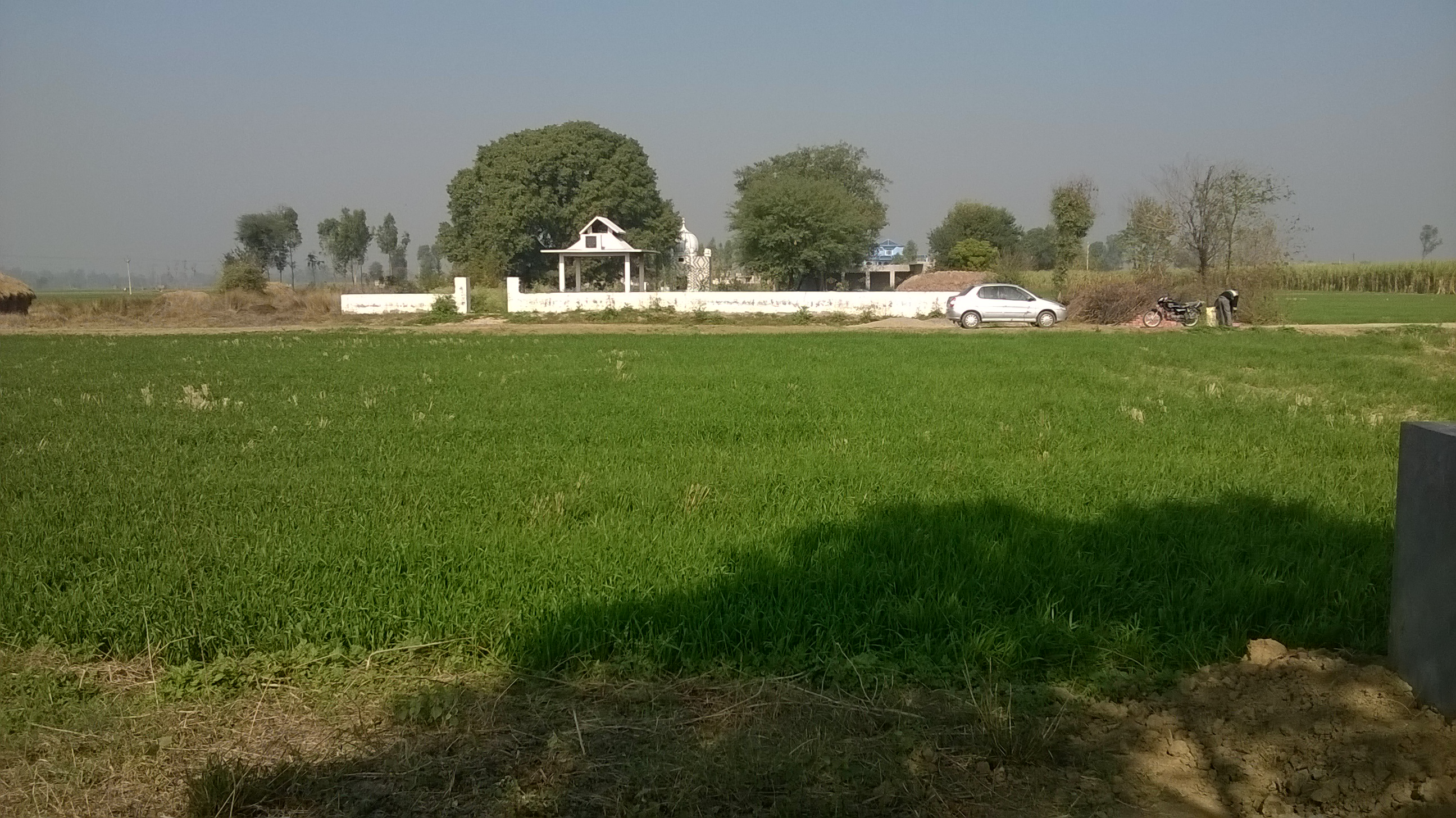
The graveyard of Todarpur

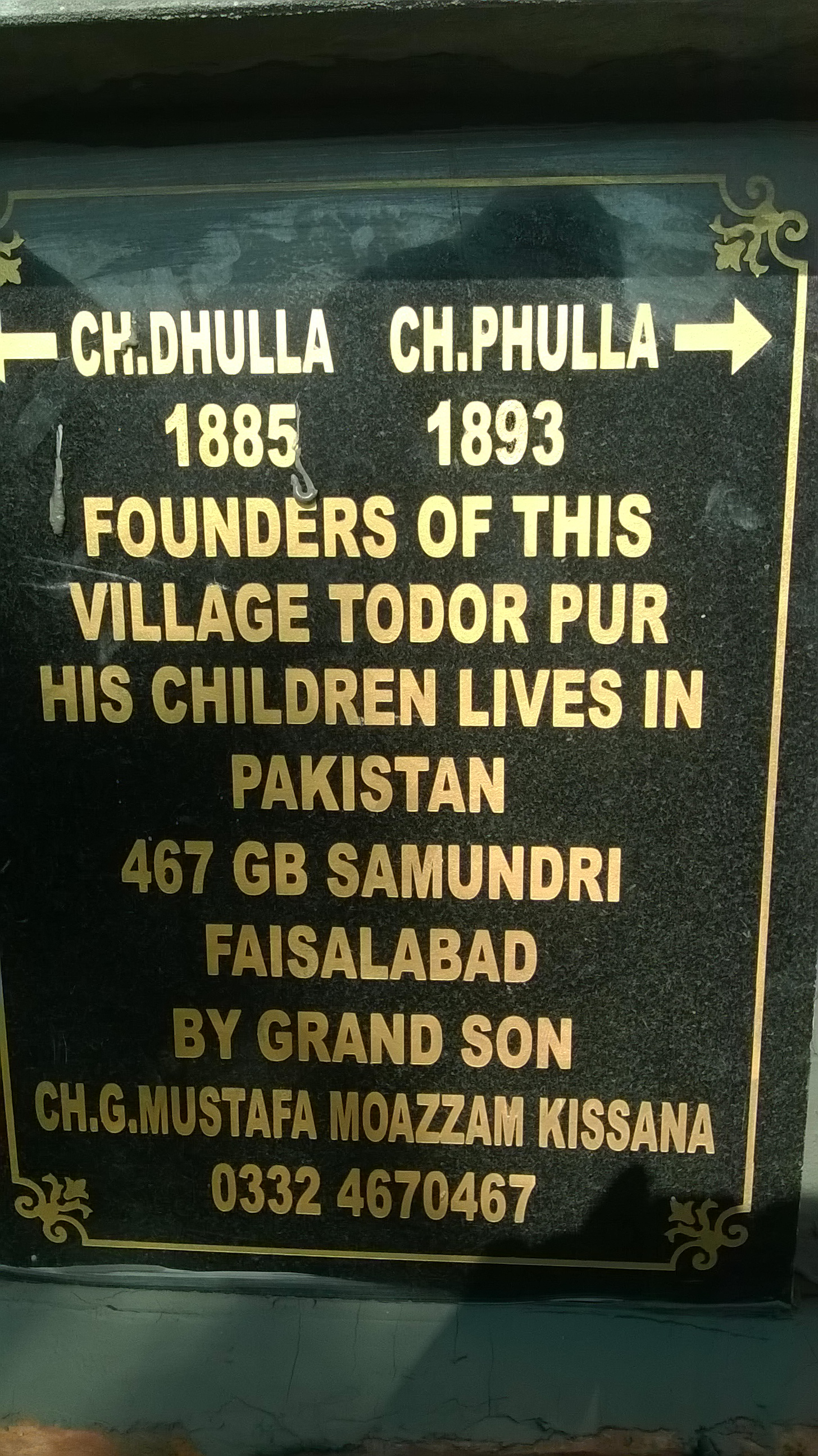
The gravestones of the founders

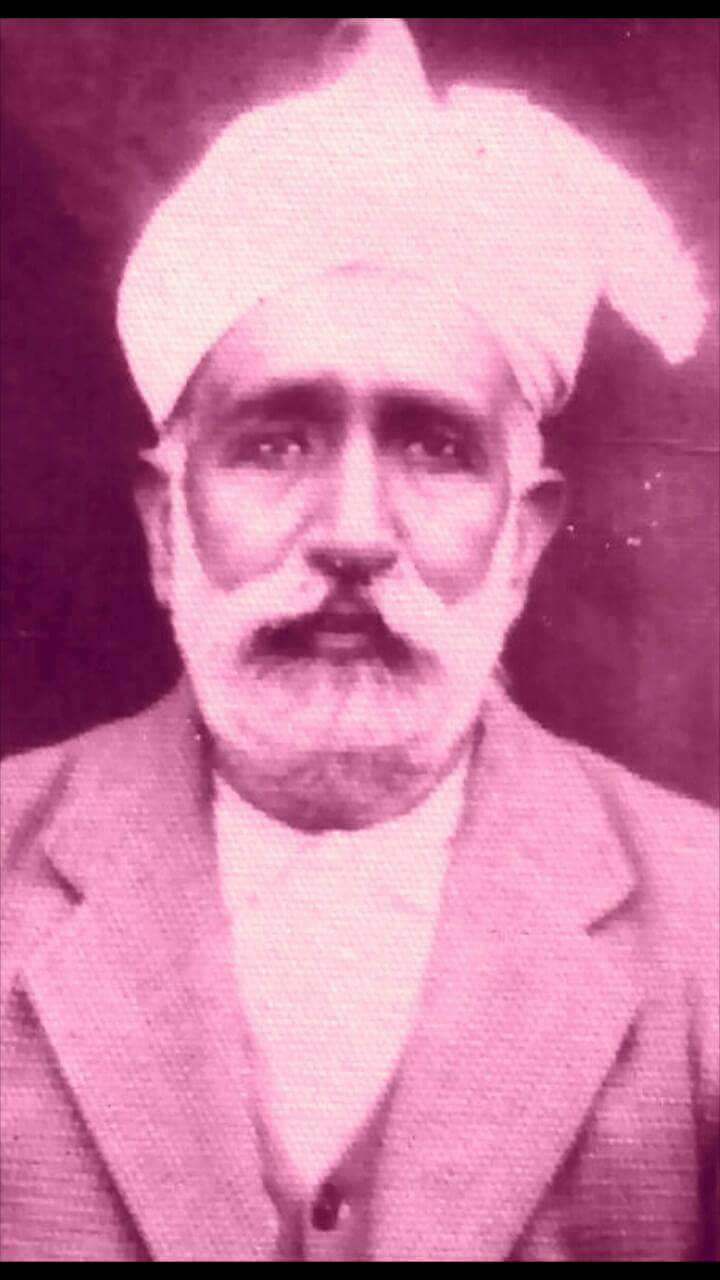
Ch Qamar ul Din Kasana, the eldest son of Zaildar Ch Karam Bakhsh
