= Maqsudpur =

- Village
- Location in Punjab, India Maqsudpur (India)
- Coordinates: 31.584864°N 75.488201°E
- Country: India
- State: Punjab
- District: Kapurthala

Government
  - Type: Panchayati raj (India)
  - Body: Gram panchayat

Languages
  - Official: Punjabi
  - Other spoken: Hindi
- Time zone: UTC+5:30 (IST)
- PIN: 144619
- Telephone code: 01822
- ISO 3166 code: IN-PB
- Vehicle registration: PB-09
- Website: kapurthala.gov.in

Maqsudpur is a village in Bhulath Tehsil in Kapurthala district of Punjab State, India. It is located 6 kilometres (3.7 mi) from Bhulath, 30 kilometres (19 mi) away from district headquarter Kapurthala. The village is administrated by a Sarpanch who is an elected representative of village as per the constitution of India and Panchayati raj (India). The village was given as jagir to the Pelia family by the Maharaja of Kapurthala.

== List of cities near the village ==
- Bhulath
- Begowal
- Nadala
- Kapurthala

== Air travel connectivity ==
The closest International airport to the village is Sri Guru Ram Dass Jee International Airport.
