= Bajwa, Punjab =

Village in Horshiarpur, Punjab, India

Bajwa is a village located in Dasuya, Hoshiarpur district in the Indian state of Punjab. The total population of the village is 472, which includes 220 men and 252 women. The village contains 97 houses.
