= Dandiyan =

Human settlement in India

Coordinates: 32°39′N 75°28′E

Dandiyan, commonly spelled as Dandian, is a village in Hoshiarpur, Punjab (India). Its population in 1991 census was 623. Its area in hectares is census 123. The nearest main road is Phagwara-Panchhat and it is 5 km away. The nearest railway station is in Phagwara which is 23 km away. Its development bock is in Mahilpur.

The village has one primary school that offers education up to the 5th standard. It is also the birthplace of renowned Punjabi-language writer Ajaib Kamal.

The village has one Facebook page named "Pind Dandian"

== Religion ==
The entire population of the village is Sikh.
