= Dhanna Singh =

Sikh revolutionary

Dhanna Singh Babbar
- Born: 1888; Manhana
- Died: 1923 (aged 34–35); Behbalpur, Hoshiarpur, Punjab
- Father: Indar Singh

Dhanna Singh (Punjabi: ਧੰਨਾ ਸਿੰਘ Dha°nā Si°gh; 1888–1923) was a Sikh revolutionary and part of the Babbar Akali movement for India's freedom from British rule. He died on October 26, 1923, while resisting arrest during his own suicide bombing; the bomb killed seven officers.

== Biography ==
=== Birth ===
Dhanna Singh was born in Behbalpur in the Hoshiarpur district of Punjab, India. He belonged to the Nagra Jatt caste. His father's name was Indar Singh, and he was born into a poor rural family. As a child, he learned Punjabi and Urdu at the village school..

=== Babbar Akali Movement ===
In his youth, Dhanna Singh was influenced by Karam Singh of Daulatpur, leader of the Chakravarti Shaheedi Jatha (Chakravarti means 'Ever Moving' and Shaheedi means 'martyrdom'). In March 1921 he helped organize the Jathas major divans at Mahalpur and then again in October 1921 at Kukkar Muzara. Dhanna Singh's associates included Banta Singh Dhamiyan, Karam Singh, and Udai Singh.

Dhanna was assigned to murder Arjan Singh, a patwari (land record officer), who had caused the arrest of Master Mota Singh in June 1922. With the help of Buta Singh and Sadha Singh of Pandori Nijijhrari, he attempted to murder Arjan Singh. Dhanna Singh was also involved in the murders of Buta, lambardar of Narigal Shaman, Hazara Singh of Bahibalpur, and Labh Singh, a mistri (master craftsman) of Garhsharikar, who had Kishan Singh Gargajj arrested in February 1923.

==== Murder of Buta Singh ====
Dhanna Singh, Banta Singh from Dhamian, and Santa Singh were armed with pistols. Banta Singh had a bomb, and the rest had various bladed weapons. On reaching Buta Singh's house, Dhanna and Banta Singh scaled the wall of the courtyard. Buta Singh was in the courtyard and challenged them both. They jumped down from the wall. Buta Singh went to the roof of the house. The door was forced open by the two Babbars, and Dhanna Singh fired two shots at him. Buta Singh fell off the roof into an adjoining courtyard. Surjan Singh Chobara and Ram Singh (Ram Chand) were sleeping. Surjan Singh tried to plead for his life, but Dhanna struck him with his chhavi.

==== Murder of Hazara Singh ====
Near the end of March 1923, Hazara Singh, lambardar of Bebbalpur (Hoshiarpur), was murdered by Dhanna Singh. After killing Hazara Singh, he went to the police station to inform them through a poster that Hazara Singh of Behbalpur had been murdered by Dhanna Singh Babbar.

==== Murder of Labh Singh ====
Labh Singh, a mistri, was murdered by Dhanna Singh, Santa Singh, Banta Singh, and Dalipa Singh. Dhanna Singh borrowed a pony which was used to carry weaponry and Dalipa Singh. Kartar Singh was arrested for the murder on June 20, 1923.

=== Betrayal by Jwala ===
Jwala Singh was an informer for the British. After 18-year-old Daleep Singh and Jwala Singh were arrested, Dhanna Singh asked Jwala Singh about his arrest. Jwala Singh denied having anything to do with Daleep Singh's arrest. Jwala Singh told Dhanna Singh that the police were near and that he should hide outside the village in a sugar cane field. Dhanna Singh hid while Jwala Singh called Subinspector Gulzara Singh to tell him of Dhanna's Singh's whereabouts. Gulzara Singh thought it would be difficult to catch or kill Dhanna Singh in the sugar cane field so he asked Jwala Singh to invite Dhanna Singh into Jwala's house. Police Superintendent A.F. Horton of Hoshiarpur was informed of the plan.

==== Final confrontation ====
On 25 October 1923, Dhanna Singh stayed at Jwala Singh's house. Jwala Singh emptied Dhanna's guns while he was asleep. The police surrounded the house at night, and by the morning, there was a police group of 40 units. Jwala Singh managed to escape. Some sources say that when Dhanna Singh came out of the house, he was hit on the head by Gulzara Singh's lathi. Other sources say that while Dhanna Singh tried to slip away from the attack, he fell and was arrested and put into handcuffs, his feet into fetters, and had his revolver confiscated. The police mocked Dhanna Singh because he had sworn that nobody would be able to catch him alive. Dhanna Singh, with the force of his elbow, blew himself up with the explosives he was carrying. The blast killed seven people; five died on the spot. W.N.P. Jenkins (assistant superintendent) and Gulzara Singh died immediately. Thanedar and Horton were wounded. Horton died a few days later. A year after the blast, on 23 October 1924, Governor Malcolm Hailey raised a monument in memory of Horton and the six policemen who died.
