= Urmar Tanda =

Urmar Tanda Tanda
- Town
- Location in Punjab, India Urmar Tanda (India)
- Coordinates: 31.6919°N 75.6347°E
- Country: India
- State: Punjab
- District: Hoshiarpur

Government
  - Type: Aap
  - Body: Aap
  - Head: S. Arsheen Singh
  - MLA: Jasvir Singh Raja Gill

Area
  - Total: 128 km^{2} (49 sq mi)

Population (2011)2011 Census data
  - Total: 23,419
  - Density: 183/km^{2} (474/sq mi)

Languages
  - Official: Punjabi
- Time zone: UTC+5:30 (IST)
- Postal code: 144204
- Telephone code: 01886

Urmar Tanda (pronounced [oɽmʊɽ ʈãːɖaː]) is a town and municipal council in Hoshiarpur district, Punjab, India.

== Demographics ==
In the 2001 Indian census, Urmar Tanda's population contained 22,115 people, of whom 52% of them were male and 48% were female. Urmar Tanda has an average literacy rate of 74%, higher than the 59.5% national average. The literacy rate suggests there are gender differences in education with male literacy at 77% but female literacy at 71%. 11% of the population are under 6 years of age.
