= Sri Ananda Lingeshwara Temple =

Shree Aananda Lingeshwara
- श्री आनंद लिंगेश्वर मंदिर
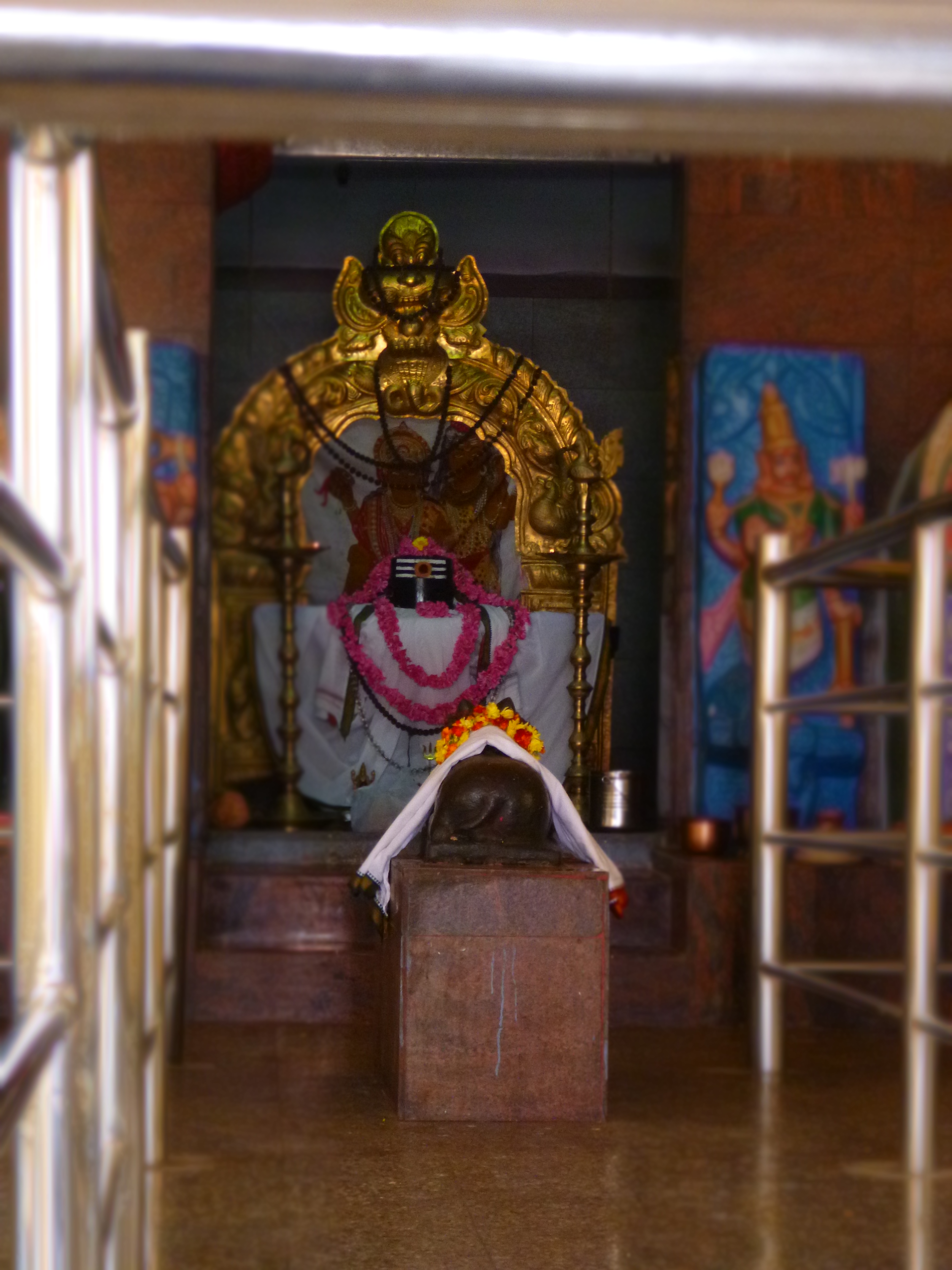
- Idol of the God Sri Aananda Lingeshwarae

- Location in Bangalore

Religion
- Affiliation: Hinduism
- District: Bengaluru Urban
- Deity: Shiv Linga as a Linga
- Festivals: Maha Shivaratri & Karthik Somavara (4 Mondays of Karthika masam)

Location
- Location: Hebbal
- State: Karnataka
- Country: India
- Interactive map of Shree Aananda Lingeshwara
- Coordinates: 13°02′16.7″N 77°35′41.8″E

Architecture
- Type: Modern - Indian, old - Chola (demolished)
- Creator: Unknown
- Completed: unknown

Specifications
- Temple: 3
- Monument: -
- Inscriptions: Chola

A Hindu temple situated in a small hill called Aananda Giri Hill near Hebbal, Bangalore capital city of Karnataka state, India, was originated in 13th century Chola dynasty era.

The temple was renovated in 2000 (the temple itself), 2009 (surrounding places of the temple), and 2012 (Ganesha Temple on the west side of the hill). In 2013 a Kala Bairaveshwara idol was installed in a cave towards east of the hill.

== Sri Kaala Bairaveshwara Cave ==
The Kaala Bairaveshwara is also known as Kshetra Paalaka that means the protector of the area. According to " Shiva purana " the devotees had to first devote the Kaala Bairaveshwara god before seeing the main God.

The idol was installed and modified by Sri Ananda Lingeshwara Kshetra Trust in the year 2009. The cave has a secret escape route to Nandi hills.

=== Tunnel to Nandi Hill ===
A secret passage on the west is believed to have helped the kings to escape during unforeseen attacks on Nandi Hills, situated in present Chickaballapura district, before it comes under Chickkaballapura Talaq, Bangalore. The tunnel connects Ananda Giri to Nandi Hill, by 57 km by road, and 49 km by tunnel. Because of urbanization (construction) the link of the tunnel has been closed in between.

== Other temples surrounding the hill ==
1. Ganesha temple (1 towards west, 1 towards north)
2. Muneshwara Temple, towards north
3. Kaateramma devi temple, towards north east
4. Santoshi mata mandir (in Garasia colony)
5. Aadi shakthi Mandir (in Garasia colony)
6. Sri Vishnu Shakti (Lakshmi) Mandir (in Garasia colony)
7. Ayyappa temple towards east
8. Shanimahtma temple towards south east
9. Kalabairaveshwara temple towards east side of temple.

== Maha Shivaraatri ==
Maha Shivratri is a Hindu festival celebrated every year in reverence of Lord Shiva. It is the day Shiva was married to Parvati.

The Maha Shivratri festival, also popularly known as 'Shivratri' or 'Great Night of Lord Shiva', is observed on the 13th night/14th day in the Krishna Paksha every year on the month of Falgun according to the Hindu calendar.

This festival is celebrated very grandly in the hill, it will be like a fair. More than a thousand people visit the temple from area surrounding hill. Various programmes are organized from the holiday to till the next day on this occasion. Every year free lunch is organised on the next day of the holiday Shivaratri.

== Photo gallery ==
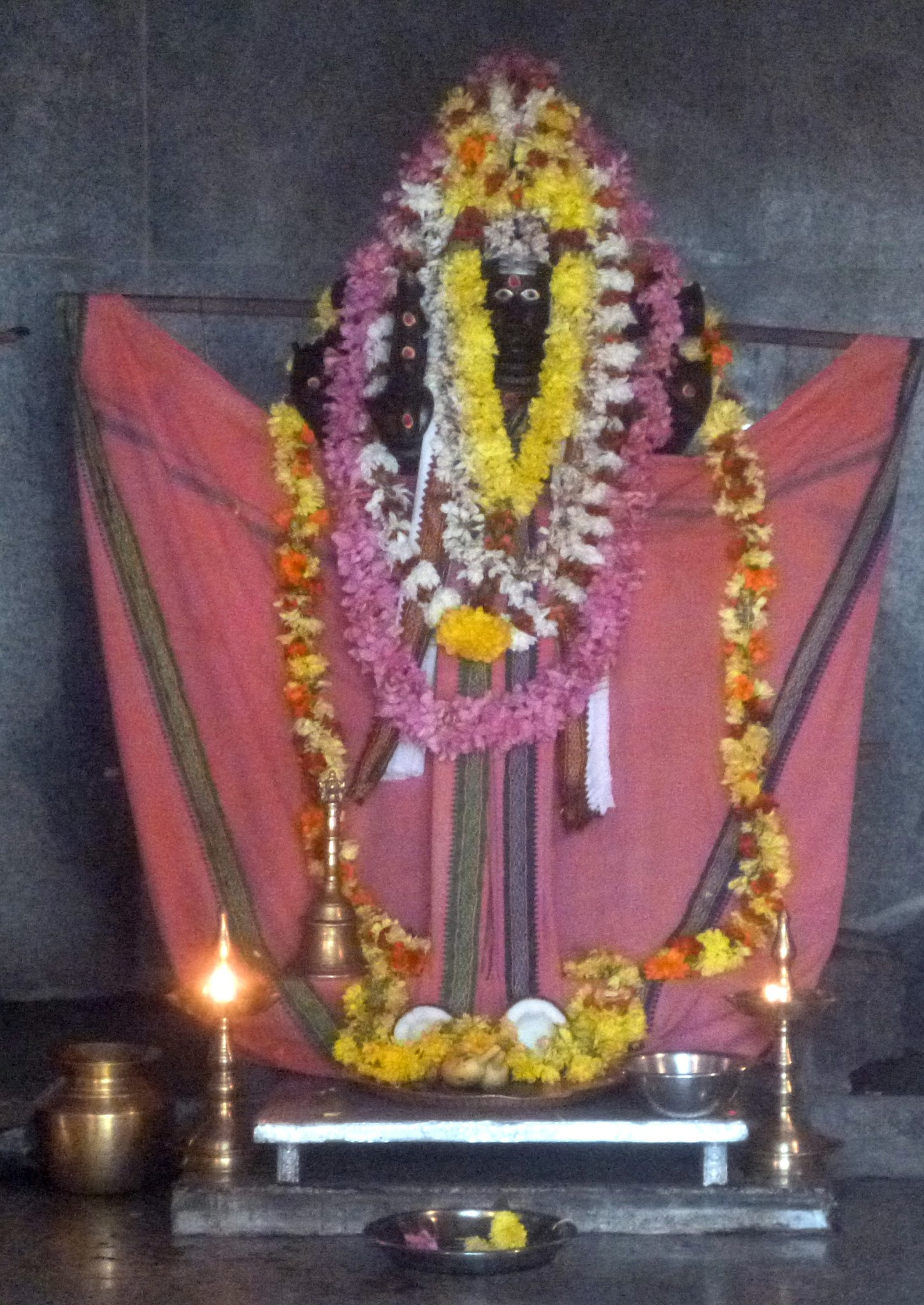
Sri Kalabairaveshwara idol in cave

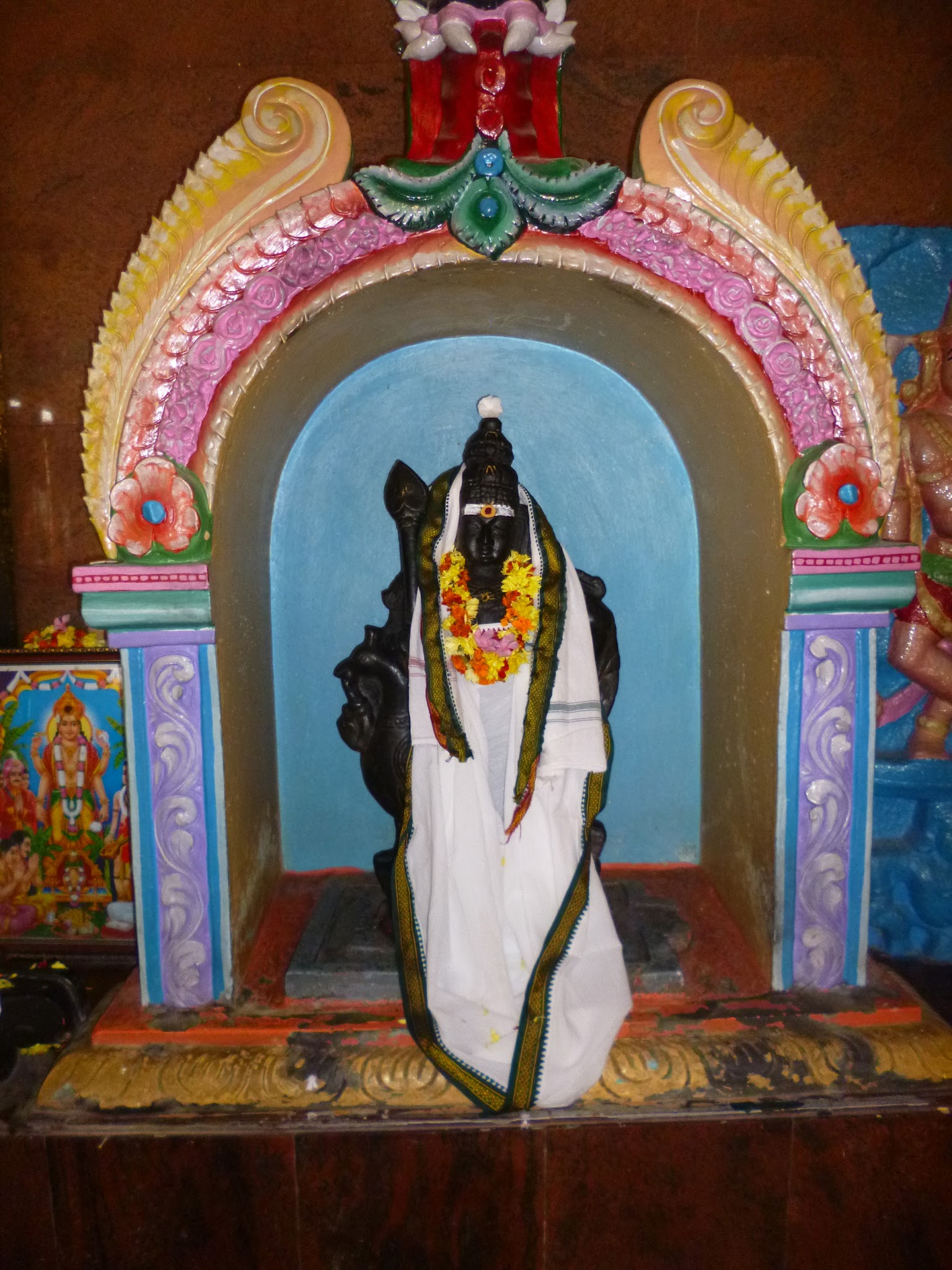
Idol of God Karthikeya inside the temple

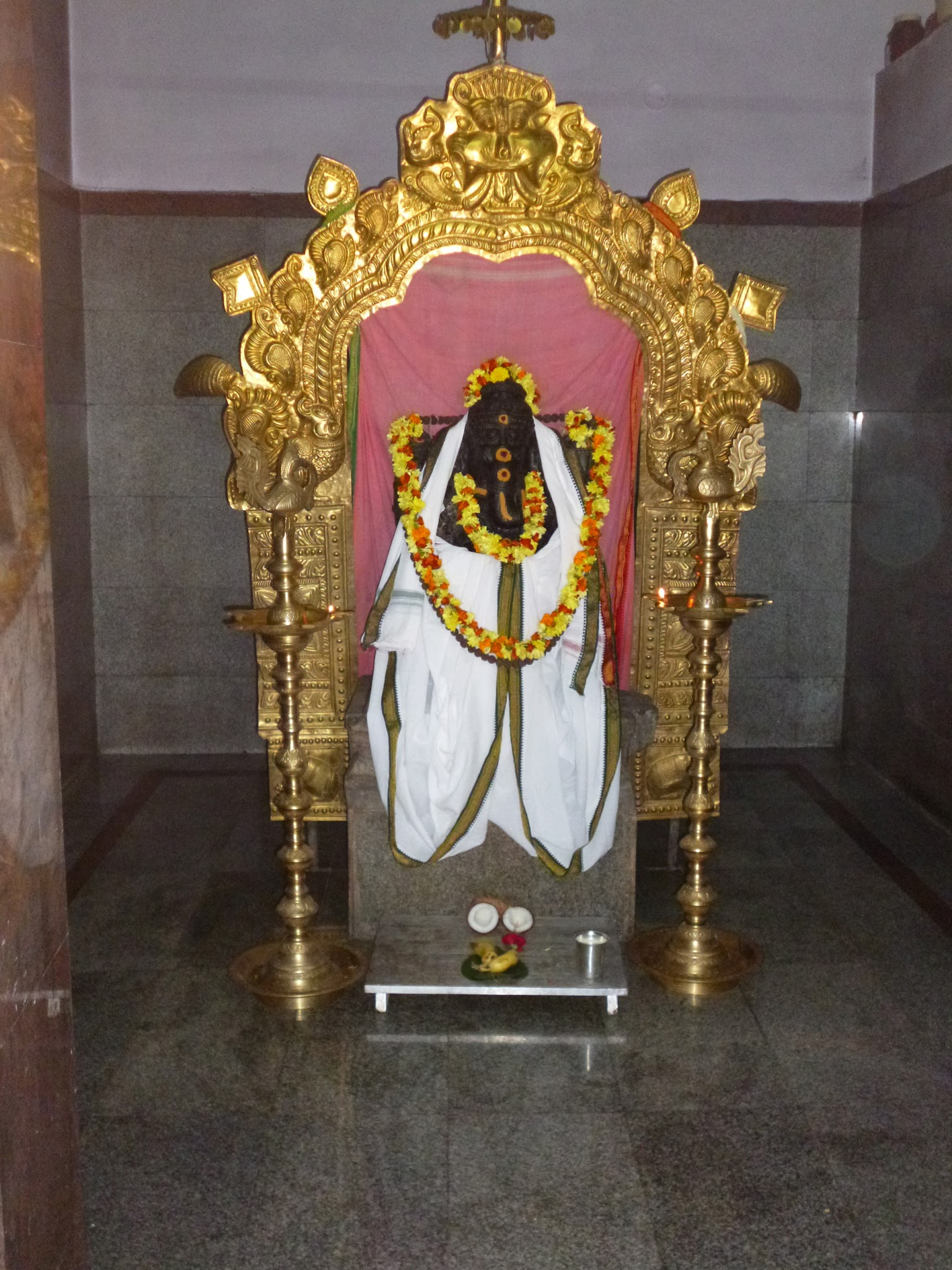
Idol of God Ganesh inside the temple

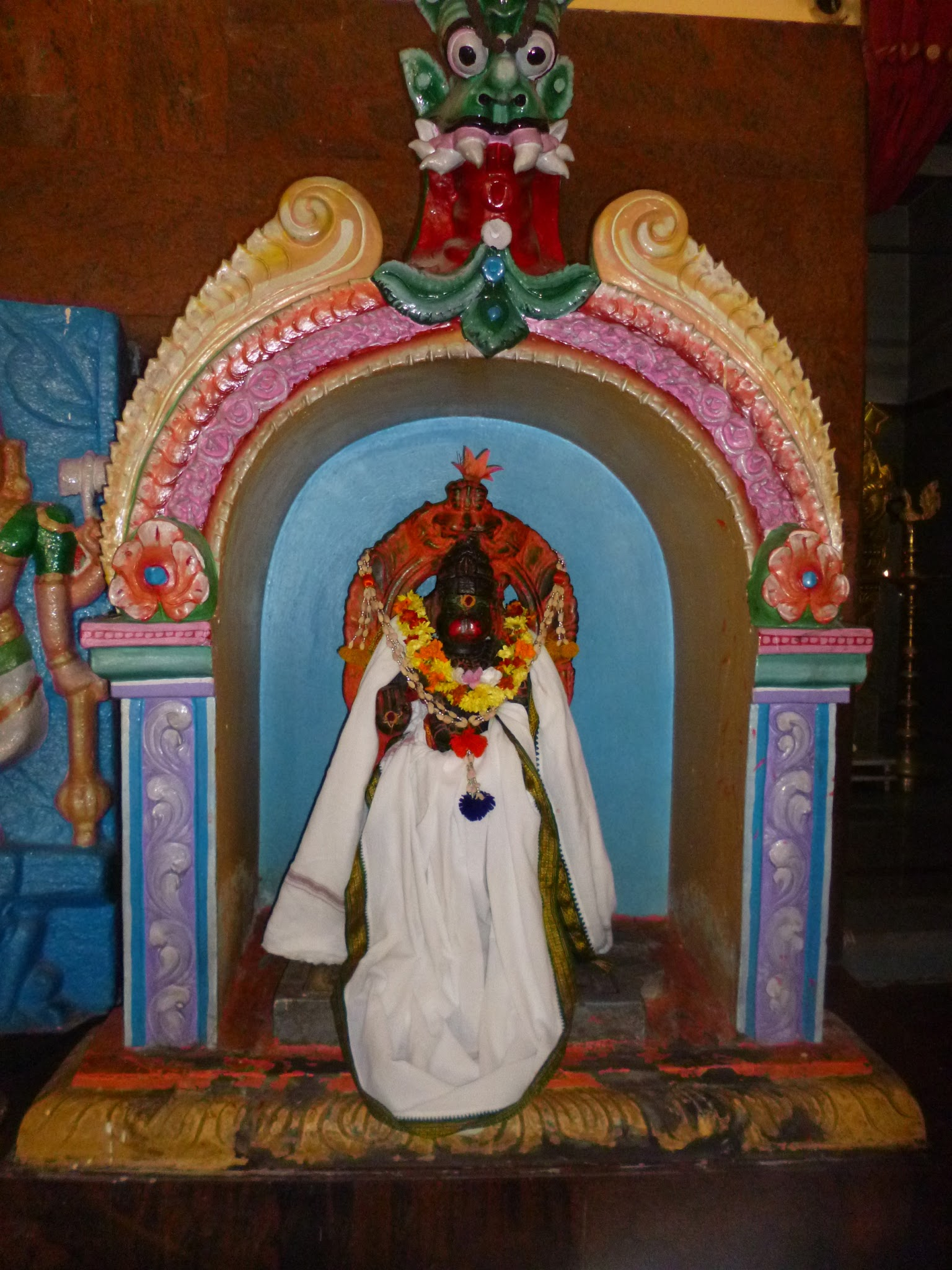
Idol of God Hanuman inside the temple

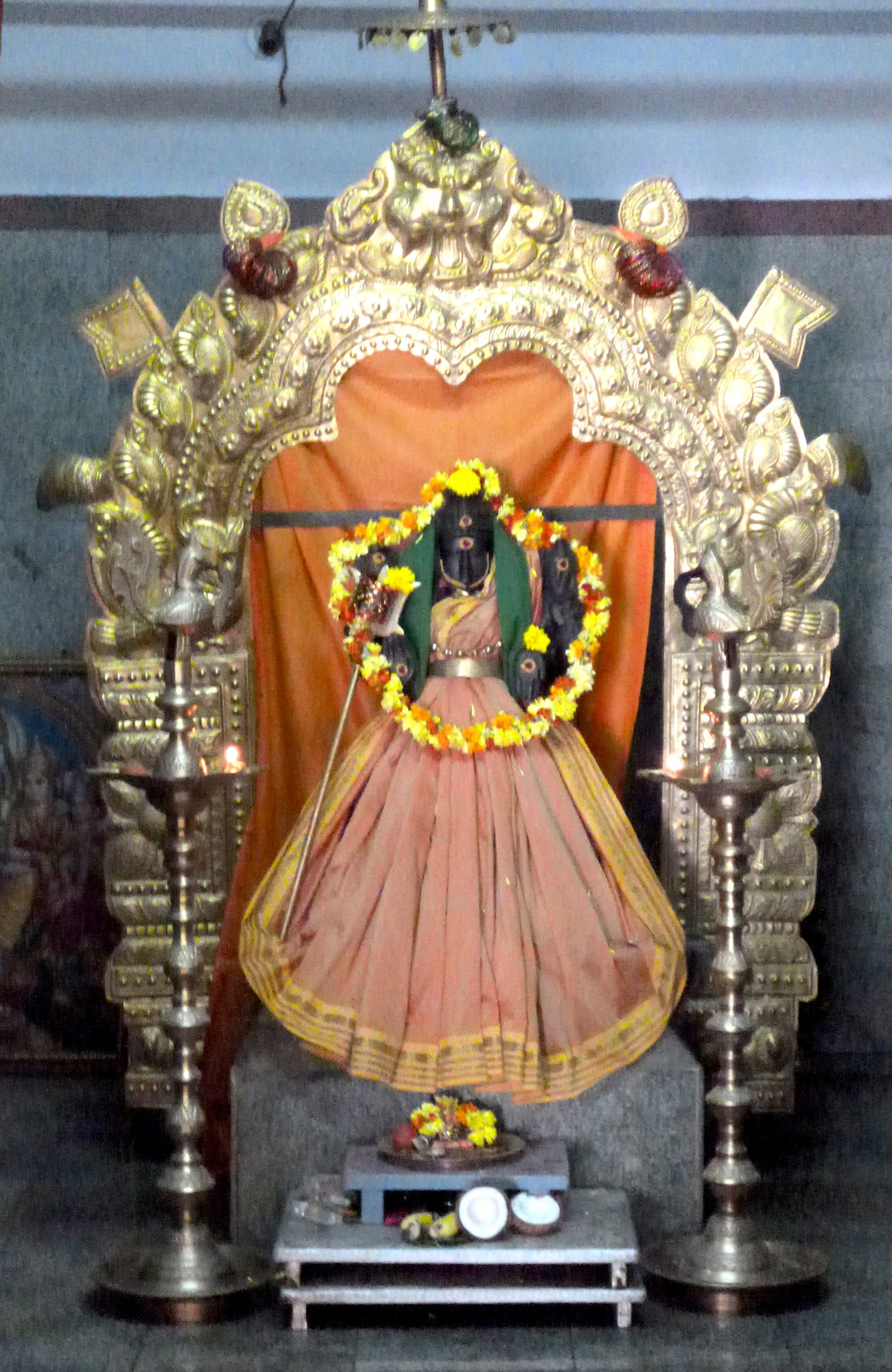
Idol of Goddess Aananda Bhavani inside the temple

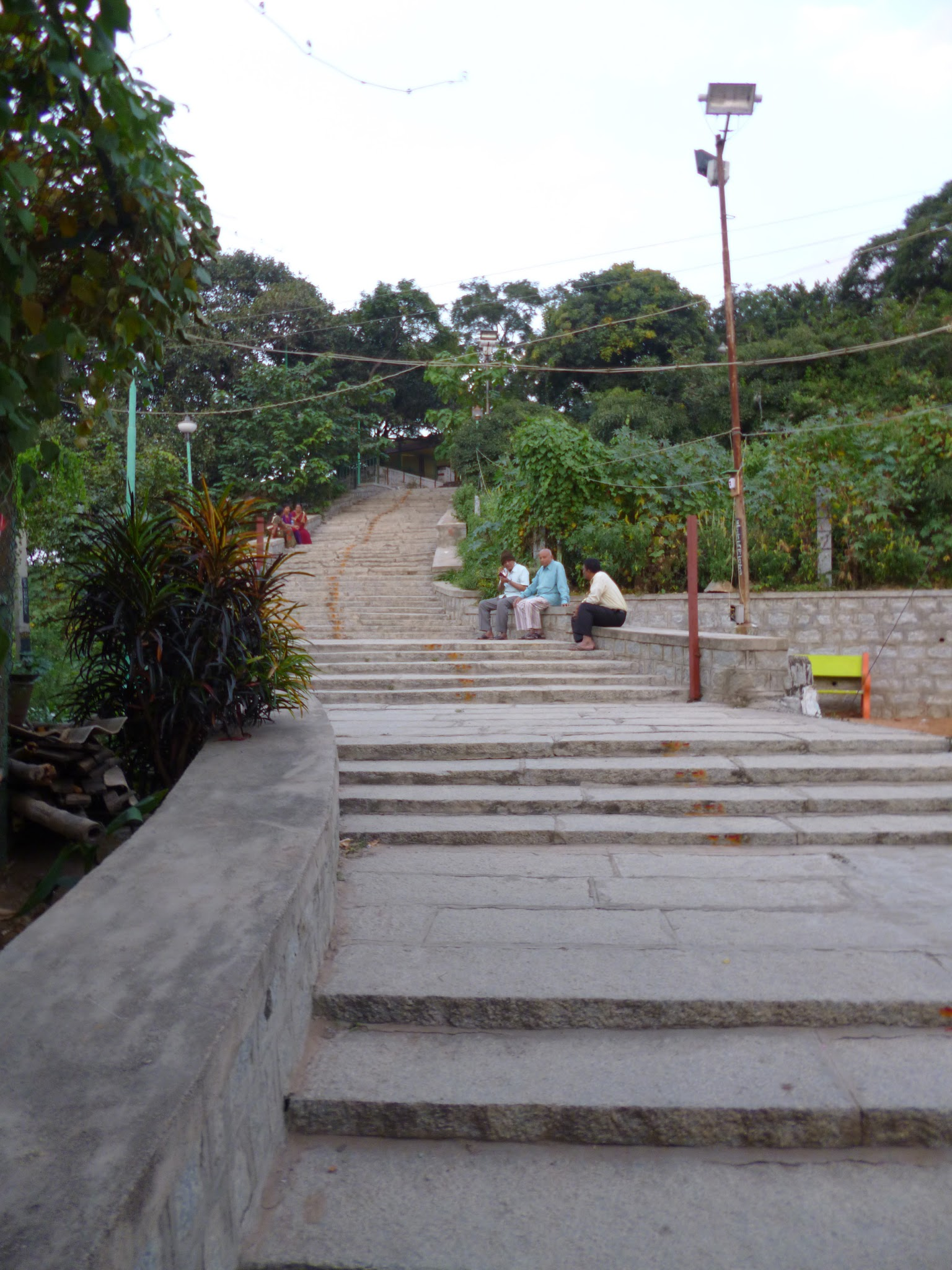
Steps to Temple Anandalingeshwara temple from west

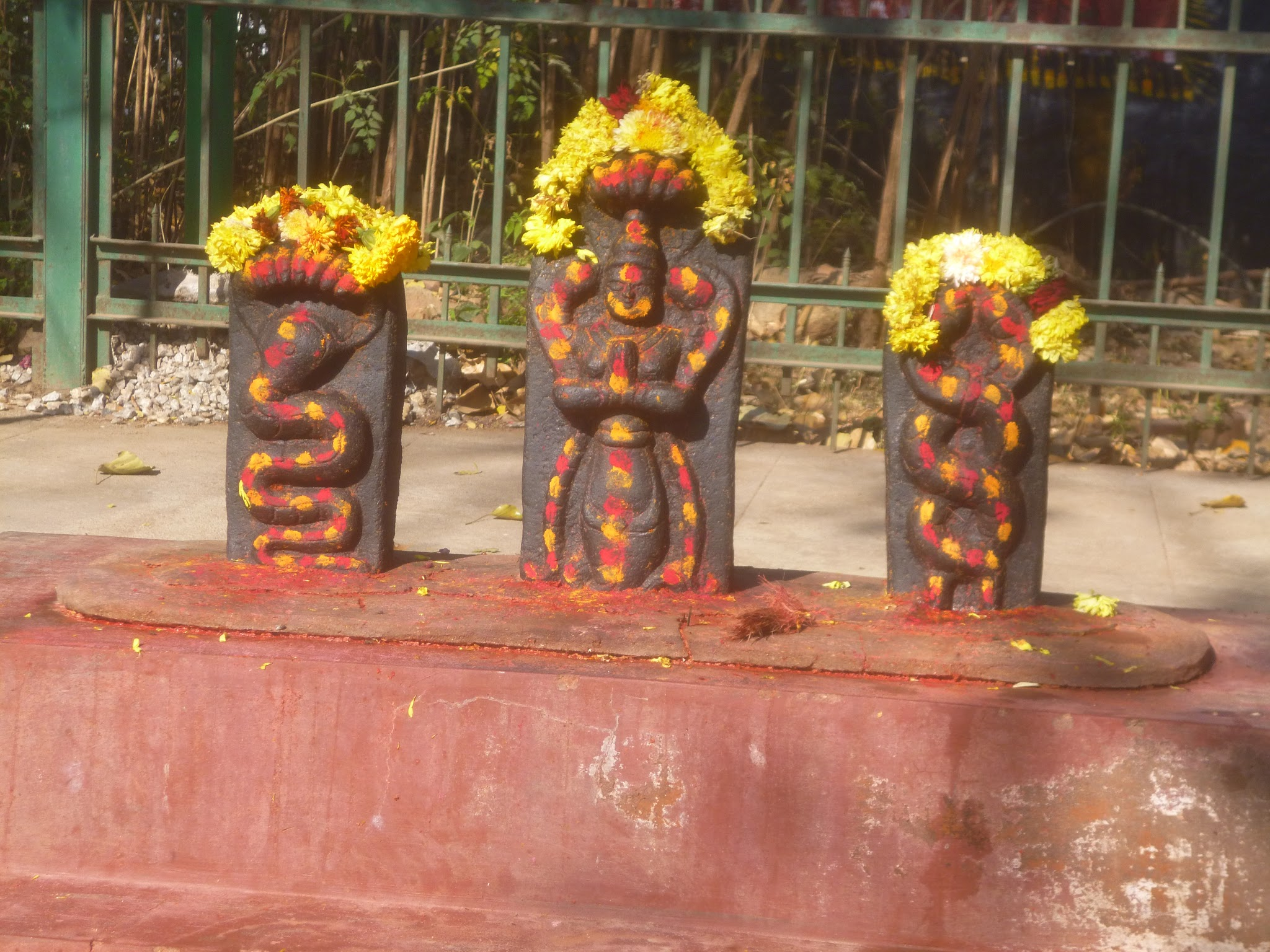
3 Spiritual Idols of Goddess nagamma

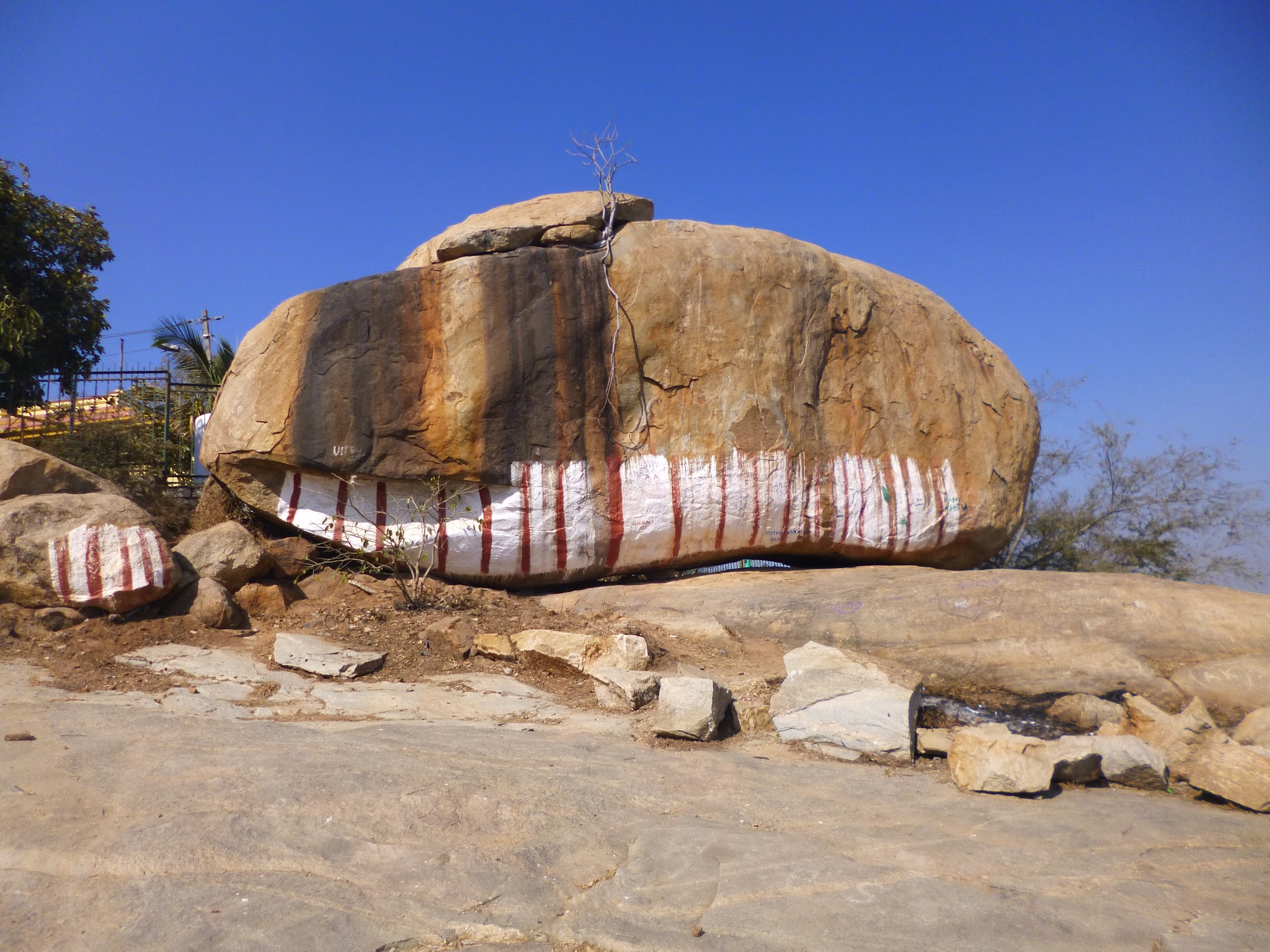
Gaint Rock called Gajanana Rock
