= Harsi Pind =

- village
- Location in Punjab, India
- Coordinates: 31°41′37.302″N 75°39′25.8294″E
- Country: India
- State: Punjab

Languages
  - Official: Punjabi
- Time zone: UTC+5:30 (IST)
- Area code: 01886
- Vehicle registration: PB07
- Website: www.facebook.com/pindharsi

Harsi Pind is a village Hoshiarpur district in the Indian state of Punjab.

== Demographics ==
As of 2019 India Harsi Pind had a population of 2100. Males constitute 50.72% of the population and females 49.28%. Harsi Pind has an average literacy rate of 69%, higher than the national average of 59.5%: male literacy is 74%, and female literacy is 63%.

== Transportation ==
The nearest railway stations are Tanda Urmar (5 km), Dasuya Junction (16 km). The closest airport, the Sri Guru Ram Dass Jee International Airport, Amritsar is 3 hours away.
