= Saido Patti =

Human settlement in India

Coordinates: 31.43966°N 76.003217°E

Saido Patti is a village in Hoshiarpur, Punjab, India. Its pincode is 146102.
