= Mahilpur =

- city
- Location in Punjab, India Mahilpur (India)
- Coordinates: 31.36258°N 76.03758°E
- Country: India
- State: Punjab
- District: Hoshiarpur

Government
  - Type: Democratic.
  - Body: Nagar panchayat

Area
  - Total: 6.56 km^{2} (2.53 sq mi)
- Elevation: 296 m (971 ft)

Population (2024 estimate)
  - Total: 16,098
  - Density: 2,450/km^{2} (6,360/sq mi)

Languages
  - Official: Punjabi
- Time zone: UTC+5:30 (IST)
- PIN: 146105
- Telephone code: 1884
- Vehicle registration: PB-07

Mahilpur is a town and Nagar Panchayat in Hoshiarpur district in the Indian state of Punjab.

== Demographics ==
Mahilpur had a population of 11,360 according to the 2011 Census.

== See also ==
- Mukhomazara
- Dandiyan
- Kalewal Fattu
