= Begowal =

- Town
- Location in Punjab, India
- Coordinates: 31°36′45″N 75°31′10″E
- Country: India
- State: Punjab
- District: Kapurthala
- Founder: Khokhar Rajputs

Government
  - Type: Nagar Panchayat
- Elevation: 225 m (738 ft)

Population (2024)
  - Total: 14,200

Languages
  - Official: Punjabi
- Time zone: UTC+5:30 (IST)
- PIN: 144621
- Telephone code: 01822
- Vehicle registration: PB 09/57

Begowal is a town and a Nagar Panchayat in Kapurthala district in the state of Punjab, India. Located 35 kilometres north of Kapurthala City, the town has an average elevation of 225 metres (738 feet). Begowal is called NRI's area. Many of them are in USA and Canada. The town's population includes of Labana, Jatt, Rajput, Brahmin, Khatri people. Before partition, Begowal belonged to Muslim (Khokhar Rajputs) jagirdar Chaudhary Fazal Mohammad Khan, and later his three sons, Chaudhary Abdul Aziz, Sardar Abdur Rashid Khan (a judge of the Kapurthala High Court), and General Aziz Ahmed (of INA fame).
