= Dasuya =

Dasuya Dasua
- Town
- Location in Punjab, India Dasuya (India)
- Coordinates: 31.813227°N 75.663734°E
- Country: India
- State: Punjab
- District: Hoshiarpur

Government
  - Member of the Legislative Assembly (MLA): Karamvir Singh Ghumman (Aam Aadmi Party)

Area
  - Total: 7 km^{2} (2.7 sq mi)
- Elevation: 239 m (784 ft)

Population (2011)
  - Total: 20,118
  - Density: 2,900/km^{2} (7,400/sq mi)

Languages
  - Official: Punjabi
- Time zone: UTC+5:30 (IST)
- PIN: 144205
- Telephone code: 01883
- Vehicle registration: PB21
- Sex ratio: 1000: 976 ♂/♀

Dasuya (Dasua) is a town and a municipal council in Hoshiarpur district in the state of Punjab, India. It is one of the major subdivisions with 398 villages under its jurisdiction. This town has a great historical and mythological importance.

== History ==
According to a report by The Tribune newspaper in 1977, the town is referred to in the ancient Indian epic, the Mahabharata, as being the seat of king Virata. In recognition of this, Dasuya is still referred to as Virat Ki Nagri today.

In the closing decade of the fourteenth century, Dasuya at least twice witnessed the passage of an army during the struggle against the Muslim conquerors, Abu Bakar and Amir Taimur. Later, in December 1557, the army of the incumbent Sultan Akbar, led by his governor of Lahore, Khizr Khan, camped at the town while dealing successfully with a threat posed by Sikandar Sur.

Dasuya featured in debates related to the emergence of Himachal Pradesh. Verma has noted that "Perhaps no other State of India has suffered as many territorial and political changes in recent times as the Punjab". Within the process of the linguistic reorganization of states, the claim that Dasuya should be incorporated into Himachal Pradesh on the grounds that it was the home of Dogras was rejected because that point was irrelevant to the linguistic issue. Dasuya remained in Punjab when the negotiations culminated in the Punjab Reorganisation Act of 1966.

== Geography ==
Dasuya is located in Hoshiarpur district of Punjab state in India. at 31.82°N 75.66°E. It has an average elevation of 239 metres (784 ft) from sea level.

Of the major neighbouring population centres, Hoshiarpur lies at a distance of 48 kilometres (30 mi) for Dasuya; Mukerian is 14 kilometres (8.7 mi) away; Jalandhar is 56 kilometres (35 mi); Gurdaspur, 40 kilometres (25 mi); Amritsar, 90 kilometres (56 mi); and Pathankot is 56 kilometres (35 mi) distant.

== Demographics ==
The table below shows the population of different religious groups in Dasuya city, as of 2011 census.

Population by religious groups in Dasuya city, 2011 census
Religion	Total	Female	Male
Hindu	16,951	8,087	8,864
Sikh	7,806	3,869	3,937
Muslim	225	84	141
Christian	178	91	87
Jain	1	0	1
Other religions	14	5	9
Not stated	17	9	8
Total	25,192	12,145	13,047

== Transport ==
The town has a railway station and is located on National Highway 44.

== Renovation ==
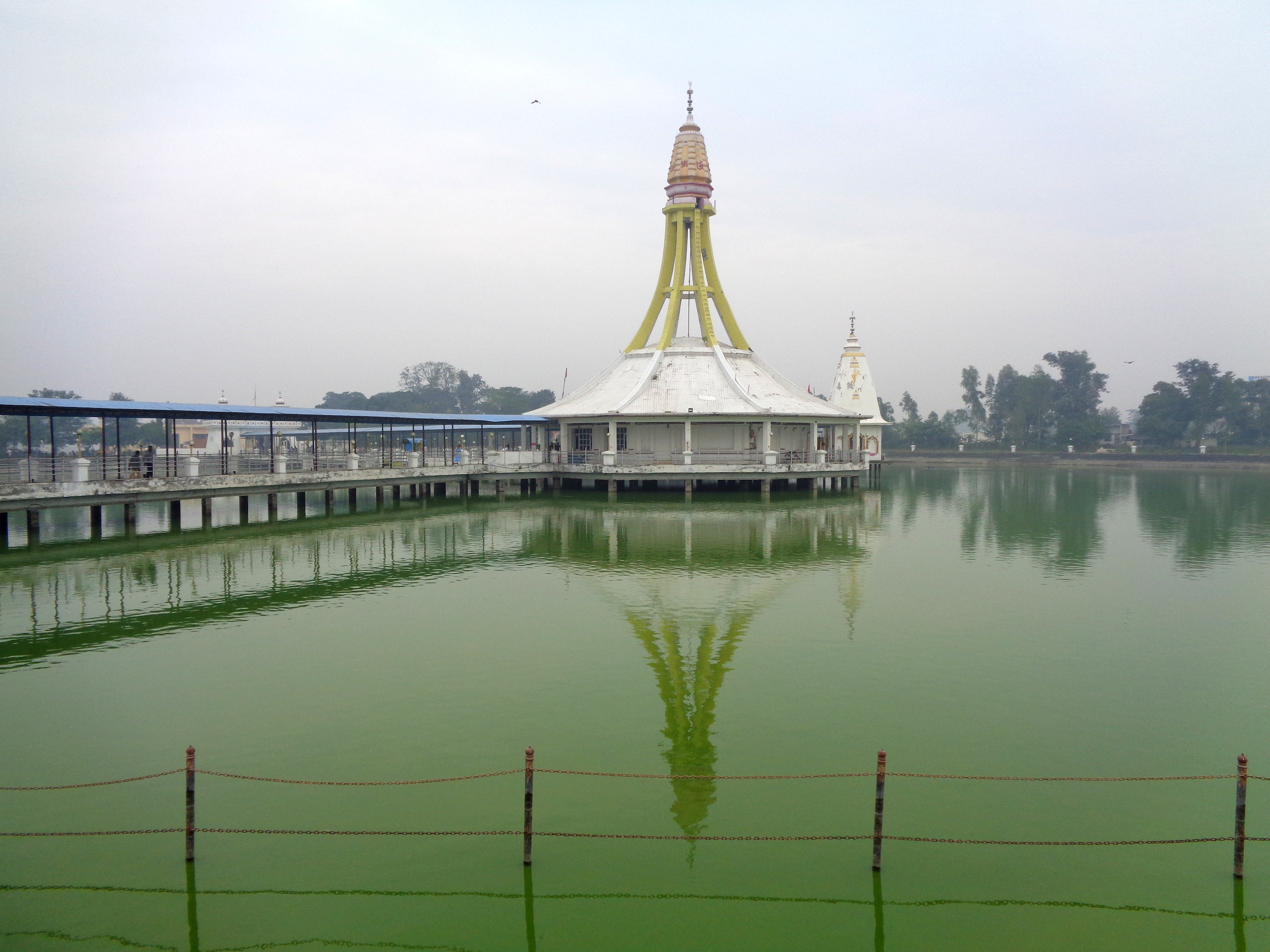
Prachin Pandav Sarover Temple at Dasuya

The Government of India granted Rs 10.6 million to renovate the sarovar (temple tank) and a temple.

== Villages ==
- Harsi Pind
- Morian
- Tahli, Dasuya
