= Hoshiarpur district =

- District
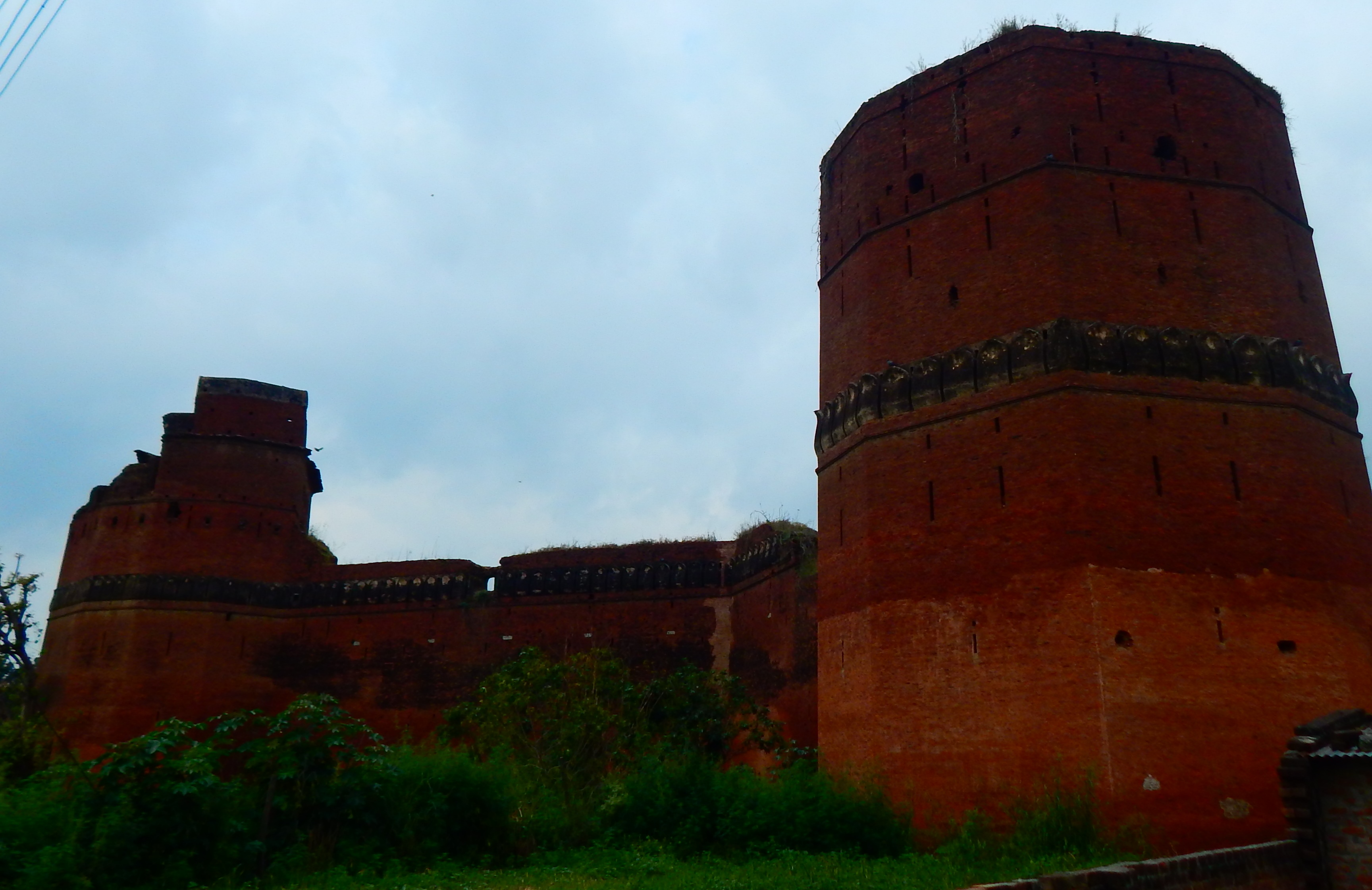
- Bajwara Fort

- Location in Punjab
- Coordinates: 31°35′N 75°59′E
- Country: India
- State: Punjab
- Region: Doaba
- Headquarters: Hoshiarpur

Government
  - MP: Raj Kumar Chabbewal(AAP)
  - MLA: Pandit Bharma Shankar Jimpa(AAP)(Hoshiarpur City)
  - Mayor: Surinder Shinda (AAP)
  - Deputy commissioner: Aashika Jain

Area
  - Total: 3,365 km^{2} (1,299 sq mi)

Population (2011)
  - Total: 1,586,625
  - Density: 471.5/km^{2} (1,221/sq mi)
  - Sex Ration: 961

Languages
  - Official: Punjabi
- Time zone: UTC+5:30 (IST)
- Literacy: 85.40%
- Website: hoshiarpur.nic.in

Hoshiarpur district is a district of Punjab state in northern India. Hoshiarpur, one of the oldest districts of Punjab, is located in the North-east part of the Punjab state and shares common boundaries with Gurdaspur district in the north-west, Jalandhar district and Kapurthala district in south-west, Kangra district and Una district of Himachal Pradesh in the north-east. Hoshiarpur district comprises 4 sub-divisions, 10 community development blocks, 9 urban local bodies and 1417 villages. The district has an area of 3365 km^{2}. and a population of 1,586,625 persons as per census 2011. The district is part of the Jalandhar division.

Hoshiarpur, along with the districts of Nawanshehar, Kapurthala and parts of Jalandhar, represents one of the cultural regions of Punjab called Doaba or the Bist Doab - the tract of land between two rivers, namely Beas and Sutlej. The area, along with the Shivalik foothills on the right side of Chandigarh-Pathankot road in Hoshiarpur, is sub mountainous. This part of the district is also known as Kandi area. The two rivers, Sutlej and Beas along with two other seasonal streams, provide drainage to the region. Besides these, the Kandi region is full of seasonal streams.

Hoshiarpur district falls into two nearly equal portions of hill and plain country. Its eastern face consists of the westward slope of the Solar Singhi Hills; parallel with that ridge, a line of lower heights belonging to the Siwalik Range traverses the district from south to north, while between the two chains stretches a valley of uneven width, known as the Jaswan Dun. Its upper portion is crossed by the Sohan torrent, while the Sutlej sweeps into its lower end through a break in the hills, and flows in a southerly direction until it turns the flank of the central range, and debouches westwards upon the plains. This western plain consists of alluvial formation, with a general westerly slope owing to the deposit of silt from the mountain torrents in the sub-montane tract. The Beas has a fringe of lowland, open to moderate but not excessive inundations, and considered very fertile. A considerable area is covered by government woodlands, under the care of the forest department. Rice is largely grown, in the marshy flats along the banks of the Beas. The district, owing to its proximity to the hills, possesses a comparatively cool and humid climate. Cotton fabrics are manufactured, and sugar, rice, other grains and indigo are among the exports.

Hoshiarpur is also known as a City of Saints. There are many deras in this district. Several religious fairs are held, at Anandpur Sahib, Dasuya, Mukerian and Chintpurni, all of which attract an enormous concourse of people.

The District Govt. College was once a campus for Punjab University, and it was predominantly inhabited by Gujjar and Saini, Dogras of Jammu-Punjab Region during the reign of the Sikh Empire.

== History ==
The area of present Hoshiarpur District was also part of Indus Valley Civilization. Recent excavations at various sites in the district have revealed that the entire area near the Shivalik foothills was selected for habitation not only by the early Paleolithic man but also by those in the protohistoric and historic periods. The legends associate several places in the district with Pandavas. Dasuya is mentioned in epic of Mahabharata as the seat of Raja Virata in whose services the Pandavas remained for thirteen years during their exile. Bham, about 11 km west of Mahilpur, is said to be the place where the Pandavas passed their exile. Lasara, about 19 km north of Jaijon, also contains a stone temple stated to date back to the time of Pandavas. According to the Chinese pilgrim, Hieun Tsang, the area of Hoshiarpur was dominated by a tribe of Chandrabansi Rajputs, who maintained an independent existence for centuries before the Muhammadan conquest.

The country around Hoshiarpur formed part of the old kingdom of Katoch in Jalandhar. The state was eventually broken up, and the present district was divided between the, rajas of Datarpur and Jaswan. They retained undisturbed possession of their territories until 1759, when the rising Sikh chieftains commenced a series of encroachments upon the hill tracts. In 1815 Maharaja Ranjit Singh, forced the ruler of Jaswan to resign his territories in exchange for an estate on feudal tenure; three years later the raja of Datarpur met with similar treatment. By the close of the year 1818 the whole country from the Sutlej to the Beas had come under the government of Lahore, and after the First Anglo-Sikh War in 1846 passed to the British government. The deposed rajas of Datarpur and Jaswan received cash pensions from the new rulers, but expressed bitter disappointment at not being restored to their former sovereign position. Accordingly, the outbreak of the Second Anglo-Sikh War, in 1848 found the disaffected chieftains ready for rebellion. They organized a revolt, but the two rajas and the other ringleaders were captured, and their estates confiscated. Under British administration, Hoshiarpur district was part of the Jullundur Division and was subdivided into four tehsils: Hoshiarpur, Dasuya, Una, and Garhshankar.

Hoshiarpur is an ancient centre of Hindu epics and culture itself. In Bajwara (4 km east on Una Road from the present city) ruins of an ancient culture can still be found. Mythologically, Teh Dasuya of this district is estimated to be King Virat's kingdom where Pandavas spent their one-year exile.

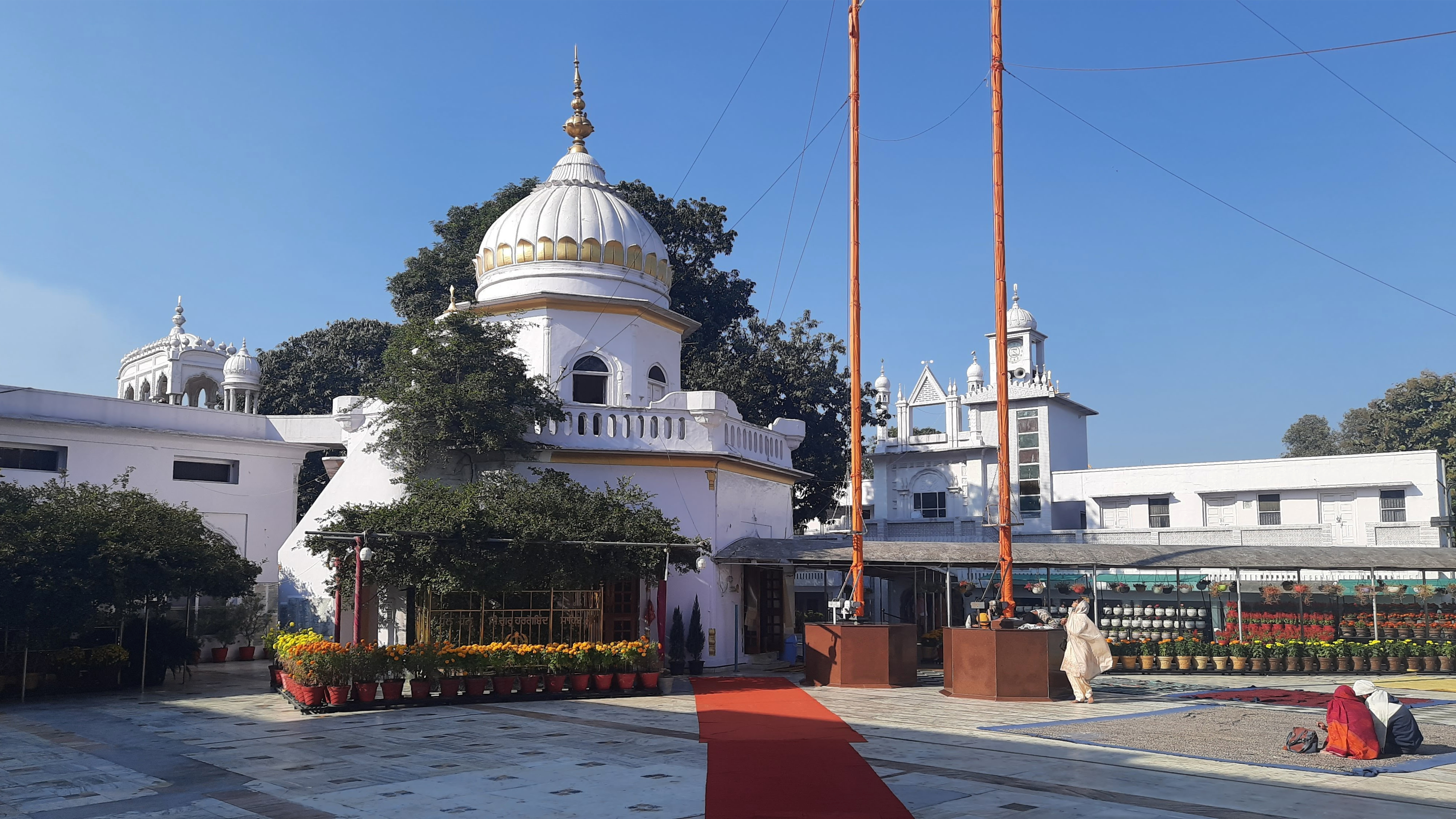
Gurdwara Sri Garna Sahib Bodal, District Hoshiarpur.

=== Bhrigu Samhita ===
Hoshiarpur is also popular for old astrological facts where it is said to be that old documents where past, present and future birth of every person is written in detail, are safely kept at this place. Many people visit Hoshiarpur to find out about their past, present and future in every birth they have or had taken in the past.

=== Significant cities ===
Among the numerous ancient cultural centers in Hoshiarpur was town Jaijon. Said to be Founded by Jaijjat rishi around 11th century at the Shivalik foothills, Jaijon was a flourishing trade centre. It was also known as a centre for oriental studies. Noted scholars and exponents of Sanskrit, Astrology, Ayurveda and music visited this place for meeting. Music composers Pandit Husan Lal and Bhagat Ram and noted Pakistani poet Tufail Hoshiarpuri belonged to the same place. Jaijon also have a small old railway station from the British era.

Ayurveda scholar Pandit Govind Ram Vatsyayan and Sanskrit laureate Acharya Vishwanath belonged to Jaijon.

Mahilpur Town Founded by Chaudhary Mahlo Bains

Garhdiwala Founded by Chaudhary Garhia Sahota

Garhshankar Founded by Bhanots

== Demographics ==
Historical population
Year	Pop.	±% p.a.
1901	650,662	—
1911	603,685	−0.75%
1921	609,650	+0.10%
1931	678,526	+1.08%
1941	769,884	+1.27%
1951	712,440	−0.77%
1961	782,483	+0.94%
1971	948,505	+1.94%
1981	1,116,326	+1.64%
1991	1,299,261	+1.53%
2001	1,481,292	+1.32%
2011	1,586,625	+0.69%

According to the 2011 census Hoshiarpur district has a population of 1,586,625, roughly equal to the nation of Gabon or the US state of Idaho. This gives it a ranking of 310th in India (out of a total of 640). The district has a population density of 683 inhabitants per square kilometre (1,770/sq mi). Its population growth rate over the decade 2001-2011 was 17.95%. Hoshiarpur has a sex ratio of 961 females for every 1000 males, and a literacy rate of 85.40%. Scheduled Castes made up 35.14% of the population.

The Hoshiarpur district has one of the highest Scheduled Caste population (34%) population in Punjab. The Hoshiarpur-I and Hoshiarpur-II have 48 percent Scheduled Castes population. In Mahilpur block the proportion of Scheduled Castes population is 44 percent and in Bhunga block it is 41 percent while in the remaining blocks the proportion of Scheduled Castes population is less than 40 percent.

=== Gender ===
The table below shows the sex ratio of Hoshiarpur district through decades.

Sex ratio of Hoshiarpur district
Census year	Ratio
2011	961
2001	935
1991	924
1981	919
1971	899
1961	902
1951	877
1941	879
1931	867
1921	856
1911	828
1901	878

The table below shows the child sex ratio of children below the age of 6 years in the rural and urban areas of Hoshiarpur district.

Child sex ratio of children below the age of 6 years in Hoshiarpur district
Year	Urban	Rural
2011	863	865
2001	800	815

=== Religion ===
Religion in Hoshiarpur district (2011)
Religion	Percent
Hinduism	63.07%
Sikhism	33.92%
Islam	1.46%
Christianity	0.94%
Other or not stated	0.61%

Religion in tehsils of Hoshiarpur district (2011)
Tehsil	Hinduism (%)	Sikhism (%)	Islam (%)	Christianity (%)	Others (%)
Dasua	43.19	53.79	1.49	1.11	0.42
Mukerian	78.96	17.18	1.48	2.04	0.34
Hoshiarpur	66.23	31.07	1.38	0.54	0.78
Garhshankar	63.31	34.05	1.51	0.33	0.80

Religion in Hoshiarpur District
Religious group	2011	
Religious group	Pop.	%
Hinduism	1,000,743	63.07%
Sikhism	538,208	33.92%
Islam	23,089	1.46%
Christianity	14,968	0.94%
Others	9,617	0.61%
Total Population	1,586,625	100%

The table below shows the population of different religions in absolute numbers in the urban and rural areas of Hoshiarpur district.

Absolute numbers of different religious groups in Hoshiarpur district
Religion	Urban (2011)	Rural (2011)	Urban (2001)	Rural (2001)	Urban (1991)	Rural (1991)
Hindu	2,52,667	7,48,076	2,15,934	6,55,989	1,35,337	6,03,892
Sikh	74,051	4,64,157	69,954	5,04,908	41,240	4,45,807
Muslim	2,828	20,261	2,081	13,313	352	6,090
Christian	2,133	12,835	1,561	11,165	625	8,081
Other religions	3,290	6,327	2,544	3,287	2,066	317

Religious groups in Hoshiarpur District (British Punjab province era)
Religious group	1881		1891		1901		1911		1921		1931		1941	
Religious group	Pop.	%	Pop.	%	Pop.	%	Pop.	%	Pop.	%	Pop.	%	Pop.	%
Hinduism (Note: 1931-1941: Including Ad-Dharmis)	550,185	61.04%	610,996	60.4%	603,710	60.99%	498,642	54.28%	500,339	53.95%	526,182	50.98%	584,080	49.91%
Islam	290,193	32.19%	328,668	32.49%	312,958	31.62%	281,805	30.68%	289,298	31.19%	328,078	31.78%	380,759	32.53%
Sikhism	59,784	6.63%	70,709	6.99%	71,126	7.19%	134,146	14.6%	132,958	14.34%	173,147	16.77%	198,194	16.93%
Jainism	1,119	0.12%	1,165	0.12%	1,173	0.12%	998	0.11%	1,079	0.12%	1,016	0.1%	1,125	0.1%
Christianity	98	0.01%	120	0.01%	813	0.08%	2,978	0.32%	3,745	0.4%	3,764	0.36%	6,165	0.53%
Zoroastrianism	2	0%	0	0%	0	0%	0	0%	0	0%	0	0%	0	0%
Buddhism	0	0%	0	0%	0	0%	0	0%	0	0%	0	0%	0	0%
Judaism	—N/a	—N/a	0	0%	2	0%	0	0%	0	0%	0	0%	0	0%
Others	0	0%	1	0%	0	0%	0	0%	0	0%	0	0%	0	0%
Total population	901,381	100%	1,011,659	100%	989,782	100%	918,569	100%	927,419	100%	1,032,187	100%	1,170,323	100%
Note: British Punjab province era district borders are not an exact match in the present-day due to various bifurcations to district borders — which since created new districts — throughout the historic Punjab Province region during the post-independence era that have taken into account population increases.

Religion in the Tehsils of Hoshiarpur District (1921)
Tehsil	Hinduism		Islam		Sikhism		Christianity		Jainism		Others (Note: Including Buddhism, Zoroastrianism, Judaism, Tribals, others, or not stated)		Total	
Tehsil	Pop.	%	Pop.	%	Pop.	%	Pop.	%	Pop.	%	Pop.	%	Pop.	%
Hoshiarpur Tehsil	95,280	38.54%	106,724	43.17%	43,567	17.62%	1,075	0.43%	550	0.22%	0	0%	247,196	100%
Dasuya Tehsil	86,938	40.32%	100,825	46.76%	25,195	11.69%	2,392	1.11%	250	0.12%	0	0%	215,600	100%
Garh Shankar Tehsil	133,877	57.51%	52,832	22.7%	45,554	19.57%	234	0.1%	275	0.12%	0	0%	232,772	100%
Una Tehsil	184,244	79.47%	28,917	12.47%	18,642	8.04%	44	0.02%	4	0%	0	0%	231,851	100%
Note: British Punjab province era tehsil borders are not an exact match in the present-day due to various bifurcations to tehsil borders — which since created new tehsils — throughout the historic Punjab Province region during the post-independence era that have taken into account population increases.

Religion in the Tehsils of Hoshiarpur District (1941)
Tehsil	Hinduism		Islam		Sikhism		Christianity		Jainism		Others (Note: Including Anglo-Indian Christians, British Christians, Buddhism, Zoroastrianism, Judaism, Tribals, others, or not stated)		Total	
Tehsil	Pop.	%	Pop.	%	Pop.	%	Pop.	%	Pop.	%	Pop.	%	Pop.	%
Hoshiarpur Tehsil	113,680	35.11%	145,985	45.09%	62,517	19.31%	953	0.29%	510	0.16%	95	0.03%	323,740	100%
Dasuya Tehsil	95,572	34.98%	132,105	48.35%	40,509	14.83%	4,729	1.73%	328	0.12%	3	0%	273,246	100%
Garh Shankar Tehsil	150,991	52.15%	67,584	23.34%	70,310	24.28%	363	0.13%	284	0.1%	7	0%	289,539	100%
Una Tehsil	223,837	78.87%	35,085	12.36%	24,858	8.76%	15	0.01%	3	0%	0	0%	283,798	100%
Note1: British Punjab province era tehsil borders are not an exact match in the present-day due to various bifurcations to tehsil borders — which since created new tehsils — throughout the historic Punjab Province region during the post-independence era that have taken into account population increases. Note2: Tehsil religious breakdown figures for Christianity only includes local Christians, labeled as "Indian Christians" on census. Does not include Anglo-Indian Christians or British Christians, who were classified under "Other" category.

=== Language ===
Languages of Hoshiarpur district (2011)
1. Punjabi (93.7%)
2. Hindi (5.27%)
3. Others (0.99%)

At the time of the 2011 census, 93.74% of the population spoke Punjabi and 5.27% Hindi as their first language.

== Health ==
In the year 2017, Hoshiarpur district had the highest number of malaria cases in Punjab at 153.

The table below shows the data from the district nutrition profile of children below the age of 5 years, in Hoshiarpur, as of year 2020.

District nutrition profile of children under 5 years of age in Hoshiarpur, year 2020
Indicators	Number of children (<5 years)	Percent (2020)	Percent (2016)
Low-birth weight	20,188	17%	22%
Stunted	22,403	19%	26%
Wasted	13,379	12%	17%
Severely wasted	2,845	2%	7%
Underweight	14,413	12%	21%
Overweight/obesity	4,437	4%	4%
Anemia	72,602	70%	60%
Total children	116,139		

The table below shows the district nutrition profile of Hoshiarpur of women between the ages of 15 to 49 years, as of year 2020.

District nutritional profile of Hoshiarpur of women of 15-49 years, in 2020
Indicators	Number of women (15-49 years)	Percent (2020)	Percent (2016)
Underweight (BMI <18.5 kg/m^2)	56,089	11%	14%
Overweight/obesity	211,477	41%	31%
Hypertension	186,652	36%	18%
Diabetes	66,736	13%	NA
Anemia (non-preg)	281,589	54%	62%
Anemia (preg)	NA	NA	38%
Total women (preg)	24,123		
Total women	519,345		

The table below shows the number of road accidents and people affected in Hoshiarpur district by year.

Road accidents and people affected in Hoshiarpur district by year
Year	Accidents	Killed	Injured	Vehicles Involved
2022	276	233	132	443
2021	239	203	142	410
2020	227	190	115	392
2019	336	254	176	543

== Economy ==
In 2006 the Ministry of Panchayati Raj named Hoshiarpur one of the country's 250 most backward districts (out of a total of 640). It is the only district in Punjab currently receiving funds from the Backward regions Grant Fund Programme (BRGF).

Hoshiarpur has 6,480 registered industrial units, which employ more than 31 thousand employees. There are 24 large and medium industries, where more than 15,000 people work.

== Government and politics ==
=== Politics ===
No.	Constituency	Name of MLA	Party	Bench
39	Mukerian	Jangi Lal Mahajan	Bharatiya Janata Party	Opposition
40	Dasuya	Karambir Singh Ghuman	Aam Aadmi Party	Government
41	Urmar	Jasvir Singh Raja Gill	Aam Aadmi Party	Government
42	Sham Chaurasi (SC)	Dr. Ravjot Singh	Aam Aadmi Party	Government
43	Hoshiarpur	Bram Shanker	Aam Aadmi Party	Government
44	Chabbewal (SC)	Ishank Kumar	Aam Aadmi Party	Government
45	Garhshankar	Jai Krishan Singh	Aam Aadmi Party	Government

=== District administration ===
- The Deputy Commissioner, an officer belonging to the Indian Administrative Service, is in-charge of the General Administration in the district, and is assisted by a number of officers belonging to Punjab Civil Service and other Punjab state services.
- The Senior Superintendent of Police, an officer belonging to the Indian Police Service, is responsible for maintaining law & order in the district, assisted by the officers of the Punjab Police Service and other Punjab police officials.
- The Divisional Forest Officer, an officer belonging to the Indian Forest Service, is responsible for the management of the forests, environment and wildlife in the district and is assisted by the officers of the Punjab Forest Service and other Punjab forest officials and Punjab wildlife officials.
- Sectoral development is looked after by the district head/officer of each development department such as PWD, Health, Education, Agriculture, Animal husbandry, etc. These officers are from various Punjab state services.

=== Sub-districts of Hoshiarpur district ===
According to the Indian government's integrated online directory, Hoshiarpur district is divided into the following subdistricts (tehsils/subdivisions) and blocks:

- Subdistricts
  1. Dasua
  2. Garhshankar
  3. Hoshiarpur
  4. Mukerian
  5. Tanda
- Blocks:
  1. Bhunga
  2. Dasuya
  3. Garhshankar
  4. Hajipur
  5. Hoshiarpur-I
  6. Hoshiarpur-Ii
  7. Mahilpur
  8. Mukerian
  9. Talwara
  10. Tanda

The District of Hoshiarpur comprises four sub-divisions, ten development blocks, eight municipal councils and one notified area committee, as listed below:

==== Administrative Divisions ====
- Hoshiarpur
- Dasuya
- Mukerian
- Garhshankar

===== Development Blocks =====
- Hoshiarpur-I
- Hoshiarpur-II
- Bhunga
- Tanda
- Dasuya
- Mukerian
- Talwara
- Hajipur
- Garhshankar

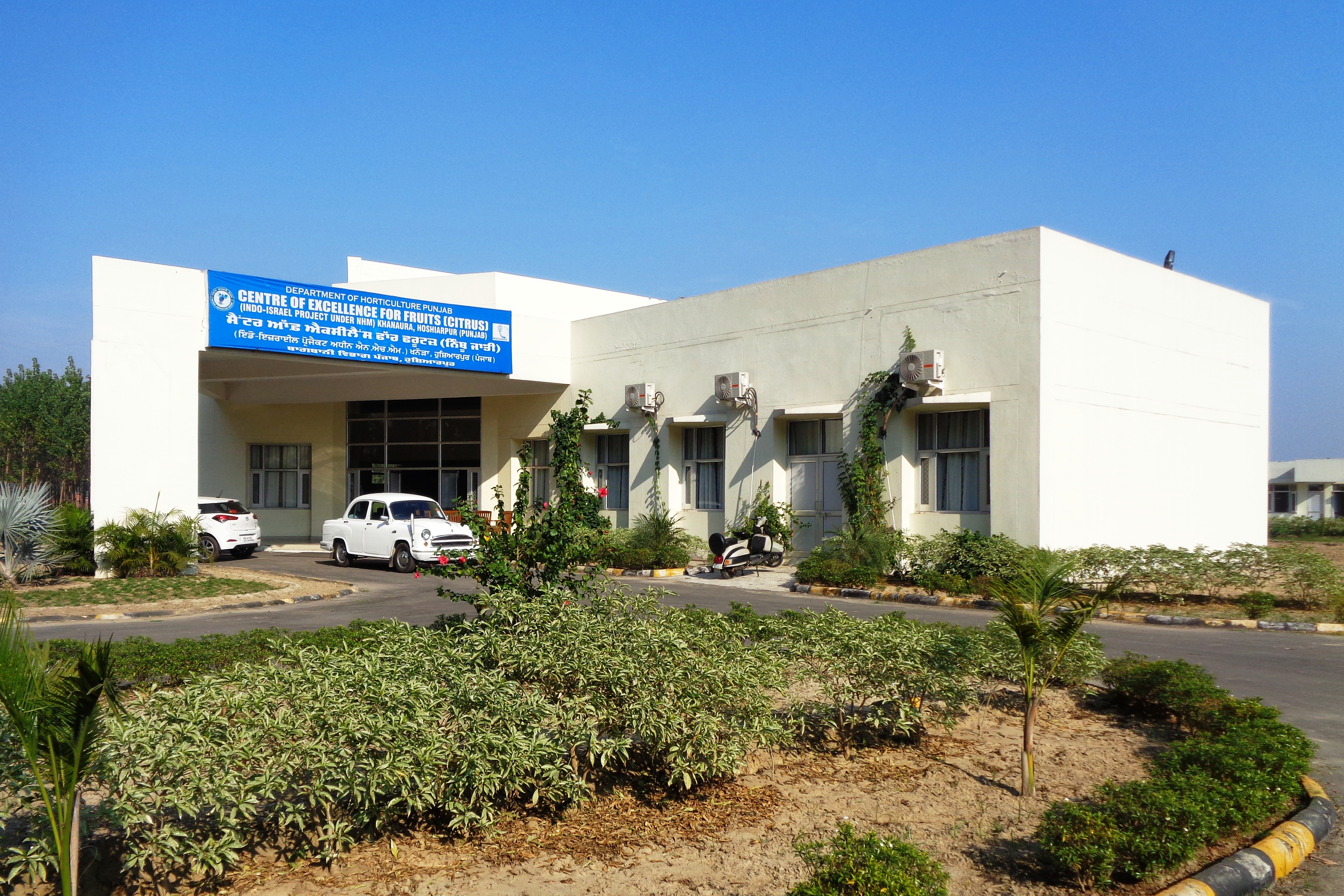
Center of Excellence for Fruits, Khanaura, District Hoshiarpur

===== Municipal Corporation =====
- Hoshiarpur

===== Municipal Councils =====
- Garhdiwala
- Hariana
- Tanda
- Mahilpur
- Garhshankar
- Dasuya'
- Mukerian
- Sham Chaurasi
- Talwara

===== Notified Area Committee =====
- Mahilpur
- Hoshiarpur
- Shamchurasi Kadiana

===== Villages =====
- Saido Patti

== Notable people ==
=== Science ===
- Piara Singh Gill, a nuclear physicist and a pioneer in cosmic ray nuclear physics

=== Business ===
- Lakshman Das Mittal, owner and chairman of the Sonalika Group

=== Sports ===
- Intikhab Alam cricket player
- Harmilan Bains, a track and field athlete and medalist in Asian games 2022
- Mohammad Nissar, once India's fastest bowler and remains one of the fastest in the world
- Deepak Thakur, a hockey player and receiver of Arjun Award

=== Politics ===
- Jagjit Singh Chohan founder of Khalsa Raj Party
- Santosh Chowdhary ex-MP Congress
- Rana Mohammad Hanif Khan Federal Minister of Finance, Pakistan (22 October 1974 – 28 March 1977) was born in Garhshankar, District Hoshiarpur
- Avinash Rai Khanna a Bharatiya Janata Party leader
- Jai Krishan of Garhshankar Deputy Speaker in current Punjab Legislative Assembly
- Kewal Krishan of Mukerian(10 October 1923 – 30 June 2008) Speaker of the Punjab Legislative Assembly (Vidhan Sabha), Minister of Finance in the Punjab Government 1980–83
- Mayawati incontested M.P. election from Hoshiarpur 1989 Indian general election
- Mangu Ram Mugowalia, prominent Ghadar Party leader and Freedom Fighter
- Harnam Singh Saini, an Indian revolutionary
- Harjit Singh Sajjan, Minister of National Defence for the Government of Canada
- Vijay Sampla, (Minister of State for Social Justice and Empowerment) MP from Hoshiarpur is actually from Jalandhar city. (born at Sofi Village, Jalandhar district).
- Zail Singh was elected from Hoshiarpur in 1980, became Union Home Minister and later the President of India in 1982.
- Ambika Soni M.P. belongs to bajwara in Hoshiarpur.
- Kamal Chaudhry M.P. representing Hoshiarpur district of Punjab in the Lok Sabha for four terms

=== Arts and entertainment ===
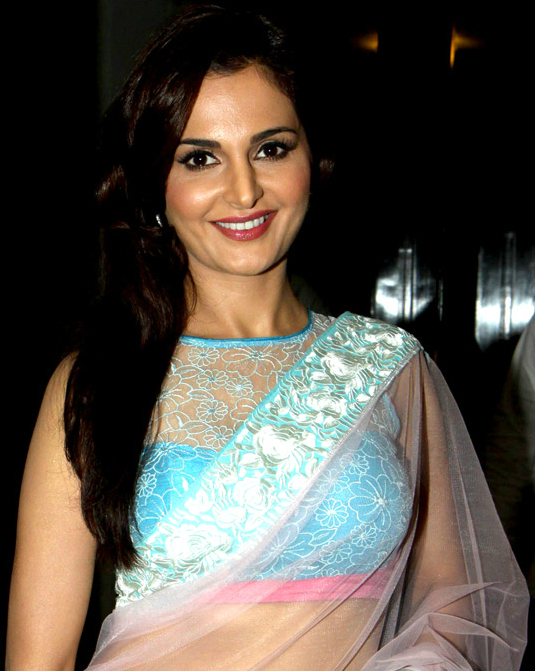
Monica Bedi is from the city

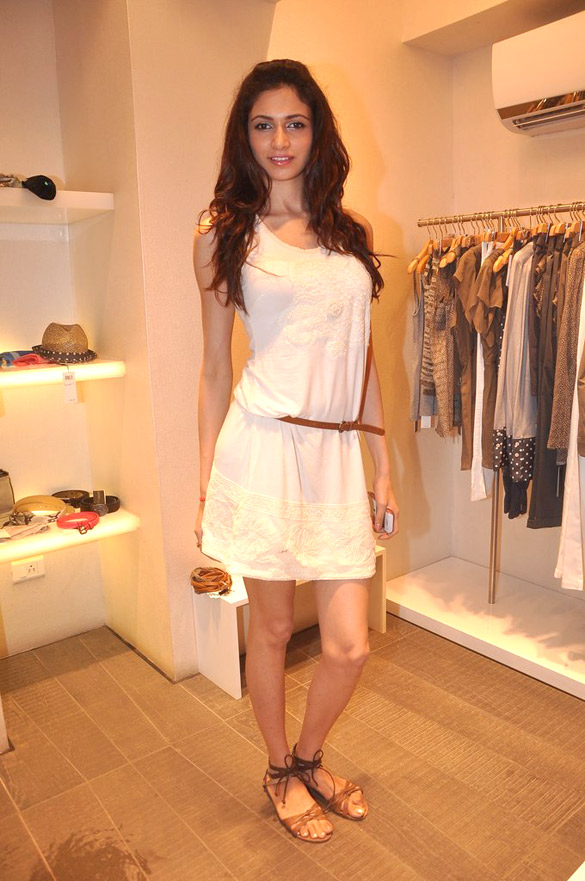
Simran Kaur Mundi

- Monica Bedi a Punjabi actress is from village Chabbewal
- Jaz Dhami, UK based Punjabi singer belongs to Hoshiarpur
- Kulwinder Dhillon singer from Mahilpur
- Harbanse Singh Doman belongs to Hoshiarpur
- Nachhatar Gill Punjabi singer born in Vill. Akalgarh, near Garhshankar, Dist. Hoshiarpur
- Habib Jalib Pakistani revolutionary poet and left wing politician born in a village near Hoshiarpur
- Hard Kaur Indian rapper
- Amanat Ali Khan Pakistani classic and ghazal singer was born in Hoshiarpur
- Gauri Khan (born Gauri Chhibber) belongs to Hoshiarpur and raised up in Delhi.
- Simran Kaur Mundi a Punjabi film actress is from village Mundian Jattan
- Shankar Sahney, singer and songwriter from Hoshiarpur
- Satinder Sartaaj Punjabi singer born in Bajrawar village, Hoshiarpur District
- Amar Singh Shaunki Dhadi singer
- D. P. Singh a science populariser and environmental activist of Punjab
- Ganda Singh a Punjabi historian
- Mickey Singh, US based Punjabi Urban singer belongs to Hoshiarpur
- Sahib Singh one of the Panj Pyare
- Upasana Singh actress in Bollywood and comedian in TV was born in Tanda
- Yo Yo Honey Singh Punjabi Rapper from Delhi was born in Hoshiarpur.
- Manmohan Waris, Punjabi folk singer belongs to Halluwal (near Mahilpur) District Hoshiarpur

=== Military ===
- Fazal Din VC, of 7th Battalion 10th Baluch Regiment, British Indian Army, during the Burma Campaign was run through the chest by a Japanese samurai officer's sword reaching through to his back and proceeded to take the sword out of himself and kill the Japanese officer with it
- Tufail Mohammad, of the Punjab Regiment, War Hero of the 1958 Indo-East Pakistan skirmish recipient of Nishan-e-Haider

=== Other ===
- Ravi Singh, a British-Indian humanitarian and founder and CEO Khalsa Aid
- Dhanna Singh, revolutionary and part of the Babbar Akali movement
