= Bora =

Bora may refer to:

== Geography ==
- Bora (Australian), the site of an initiation ceremony in Australian aboriginal culture, sometimes known as Bora rings
- Bora, India, a village in Punjab, India
- Borá, a city in the São Paulo state in Brazil
- Bora (wind), a north to north-eastern katabatic wind in areas near the Adriatic Sea.
- Bora River, a name for the Lotru River in Romania
- Bora River, a semi-fictional river in The African Queen (novel), also named the Ulanga-Bora River, know often known as the Ulanga River.
- Bora (district), Ethiopia

== Art, entertainment, and media ==
=== Fictional entities ===
- Bora (comics), a Marvel Comics character with wind-related powers
- Bora Horza Gobuchul, the protagonist of the novel Consider Phlebas by Iain M. Banks

=== Television ===
- Bora (television series)
- Bora, a super-powerful robot that fought Pluto in an Astro Boy (1980 TV series) episode; Bora's attack is a powerful cry that releases a katabatic wind
- Bora, a character in Dragon Ball
- Bora, a group of rebel colonists found in the 2000 game Tachyon: The Fringe

== People ==
=== Culture ===
- Bora language, a Witotoan language spoken in Western Amazon forest region (Peru, Brazil, and Colombia)
- Bora people, the ethnic group that speaks the Bora language

=== Name ===
- Bora (surname); also a former military/professional title in Assam
- Bo-ra, a Korean given name (including a list of people with the name)
- Bora (Albanian name), an Albanian feminine given name
- Bora (Turkish name), a Turkish masculine given name (including a list of people with the name)
- Bora Ćosić (born 1932), Croatian-German writer
- Bora Milutinović (born 1944), Serbian footballer and manager

== Transportation and vehicles ==
- Bora-class corvette, a hoverborne guided missile corvette in the Russian navy
- Bora One and Bora Two, aerodynamic bicycle wheels manufactured by Italian company Campagnolo
- Paradelta Bora, an Italian paraglider design
- Maserati Bora, an Italian sports car named after the Bora wind
- Volkswagen Bora/Jetta, a German small sedan, named after the Bora wind

== Other uses ==
- Bora (wind), a katabatic wind in the Adriatic Sea and the Black Sea regions of southeastern Europe and Turkey
- Bora (missile), a tactical ballistic missile of Turkey
- Bora, an Aurora A kinase activator in the cell cycle
- BORA, acronym for the New Zealand Bill of Rights Act 1990
- Bora, the Guyanese name for Vigna unguiculata subsp. sesquipedalis, a legume that grows in tropical and subtropical climates
- Bora–Hansgrohe, a cycling team sponsored by a German manufacturer of cooktops
- Bora Lüftungstechnik GmbH, a German kitchen appliances company

== See also ==
- Bohra (disambiguation)
- Bora Bora (disambiguation)
- Bori (disambiguation)
- Borat, a fictional character
