= Gantry (transport) =

Structure on which road signs are mounted

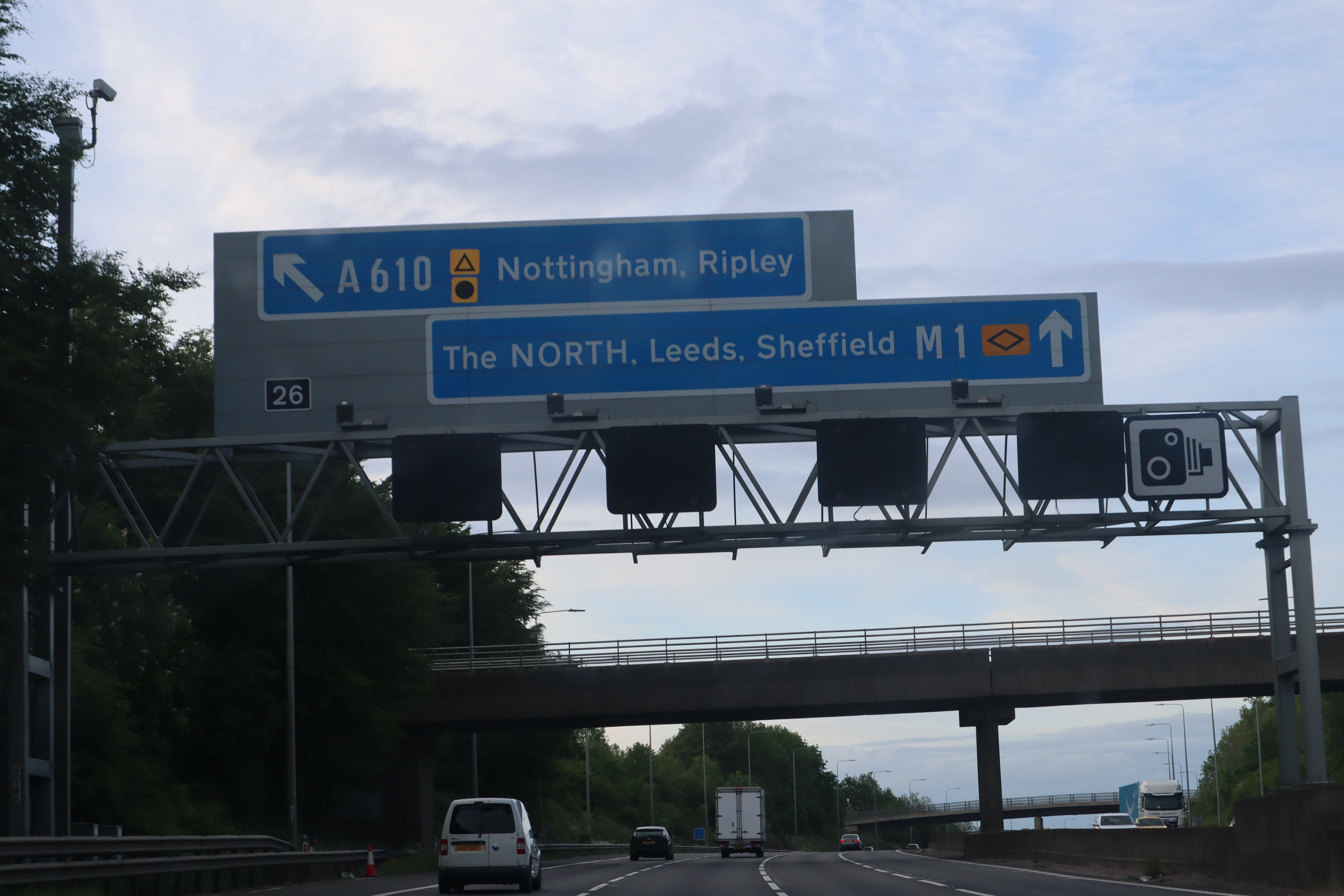
Modern Gantry with dot-matrix lane usage indicators, directional signage, a CCTV camera and traffic enforcement camera

A gantry (also known as a sign holder, road sign holder, sign structure or road sign structure) is a traffic sign assembly in which signs are mounted or railway signals are supported on an overhead support. They also often contain the apparatus for traffic monitoring systems and cameras, or open road tolling systems.

Gantries are usually built on high-traffic roads or routes with several lanes, where signs posted on the side of the highway would be hard for drivers to see. Gantries may be cantilevered or one-sided on the left, right and center (sometimes referred to as a half-gantry or butterfly gantry), or they may be bridges with poles on each side. Similar gantries are used in railway signalling or to suspend overhead lines on multi-track lines.

== Around the world ==
=== Canada ===
Gantries are commonly used on urban highways in Canada to support overhead signs, with half-gantries used to place signs near exits where space does not permit having signs to the right side of the roadway. Gantries may also be used to hold cameras for toll road entrances/exits and to hold electronic information signs.

Across Canada, highway signage on gantries is generally green, with blue being used for various specific purposes. For example, on Ontario's 400 series highways, blue signs are used to indicate outer collector lanes, while the standard green signs are used for inner express lanes. Blue signs are also used to indicate Express Toll Routes (such as Ontario Highway 407). Overhead blue signs are also used to indicate roads going into airports.

The style of gantry used are mostly truss gantries. Older gantries have truss supports (round or box) and newer ones are now supported by cylindrical legs. In most jurisdictions in Canada, signs that are mounted on overhead gantries are installed perpendicular to the roadway. In Québec, however, signs are angled slightly face-down towards the roadway such that the sign face is directed towards the motorists below. In New Brunswick, the opposite is true: signs are angled slightly face-up to capture and reflect more sunlight towards the roadway.

=== Hong Kong ===
Hong Kong's highways use a gantry crane type to support signs. The road signs are usually located on top and some have lights to indicate open or closed lanes.

=== United Kingdom ===
Gantry signs are being installed at various locations around the trunk motorway network as increasing amounts of traffic mean that road signs at the side of the carriageway are frequently obscured by large goods vehicles. They may also consist of variable-message signs, and more recently Active Traffic Management, to close lanes due to accidents and for other reasons. They can also be used to specify temporary speed limits. Gantries in the United Kingdom display exit (junction) numbers, distances to junctions / exits (1 mile, 1/2 mile, 1/4 mile, 1/3 mile, 3/4 mile, 2/3 mile) and destinations reached, and if necessary what lane to use for them.

=== United States ===
Gantry signs are used frequently in the U.S., particularly in urban areas where freeways have an exit every mile to fit in with the grid system. These half-gantries usually have the exit number and the road or street that can be reached. Gantries can also span the whole road, such as at major junctions.

== Designs ==
- Truss or latticework designs
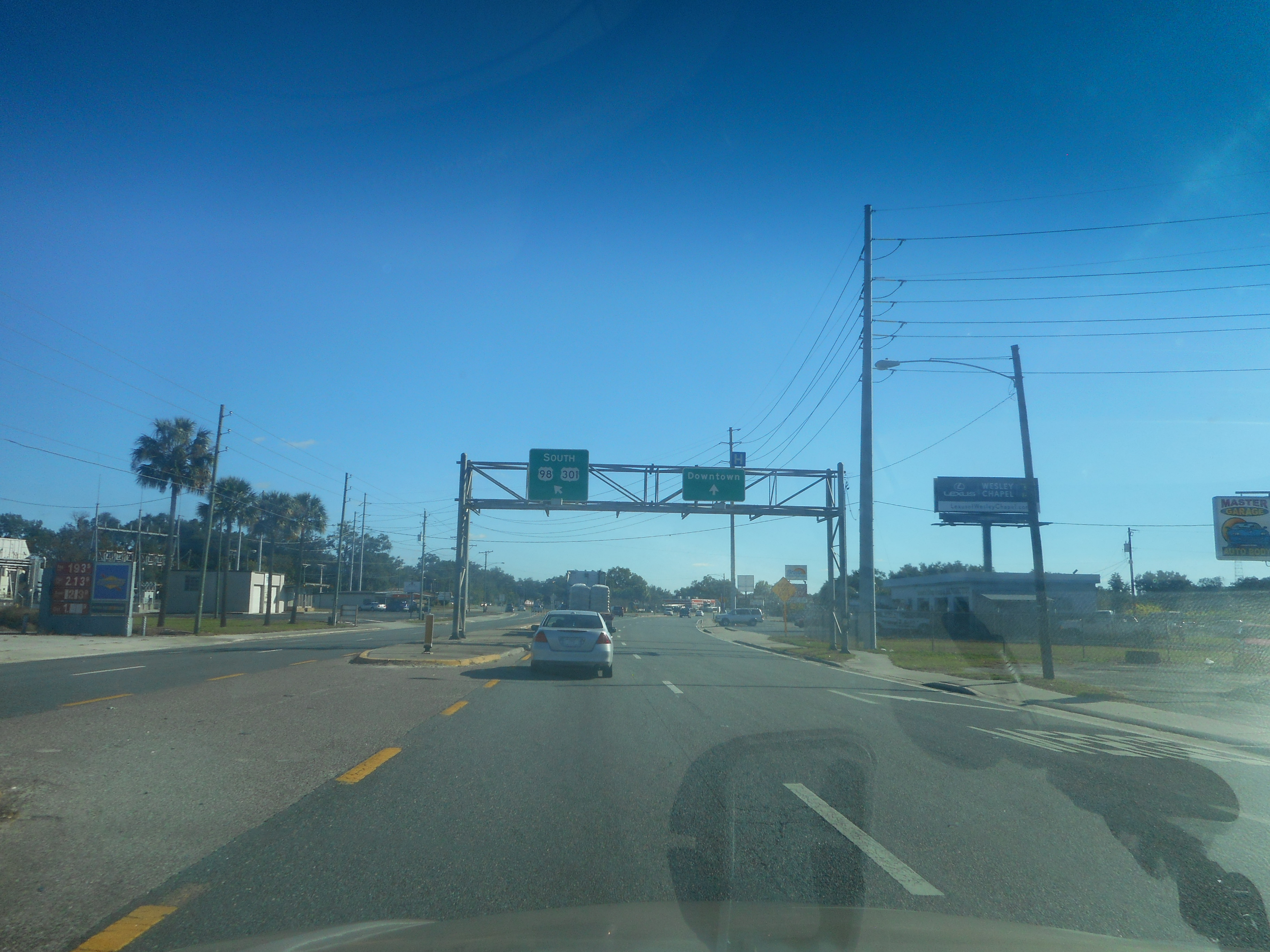
US 98 Dade City

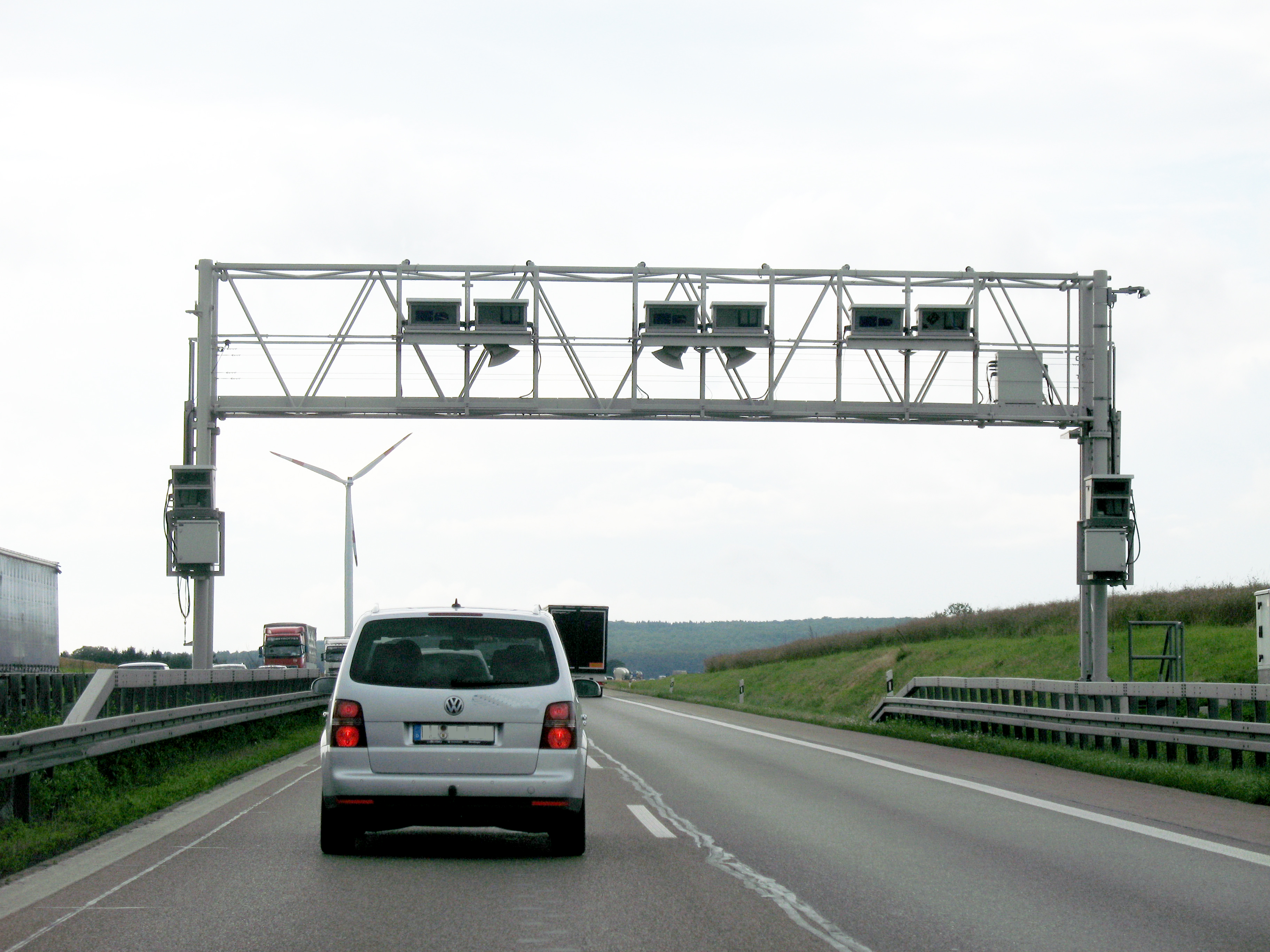
Electronic toll collection verification of road tax payment by trucks on German controlled-access highways

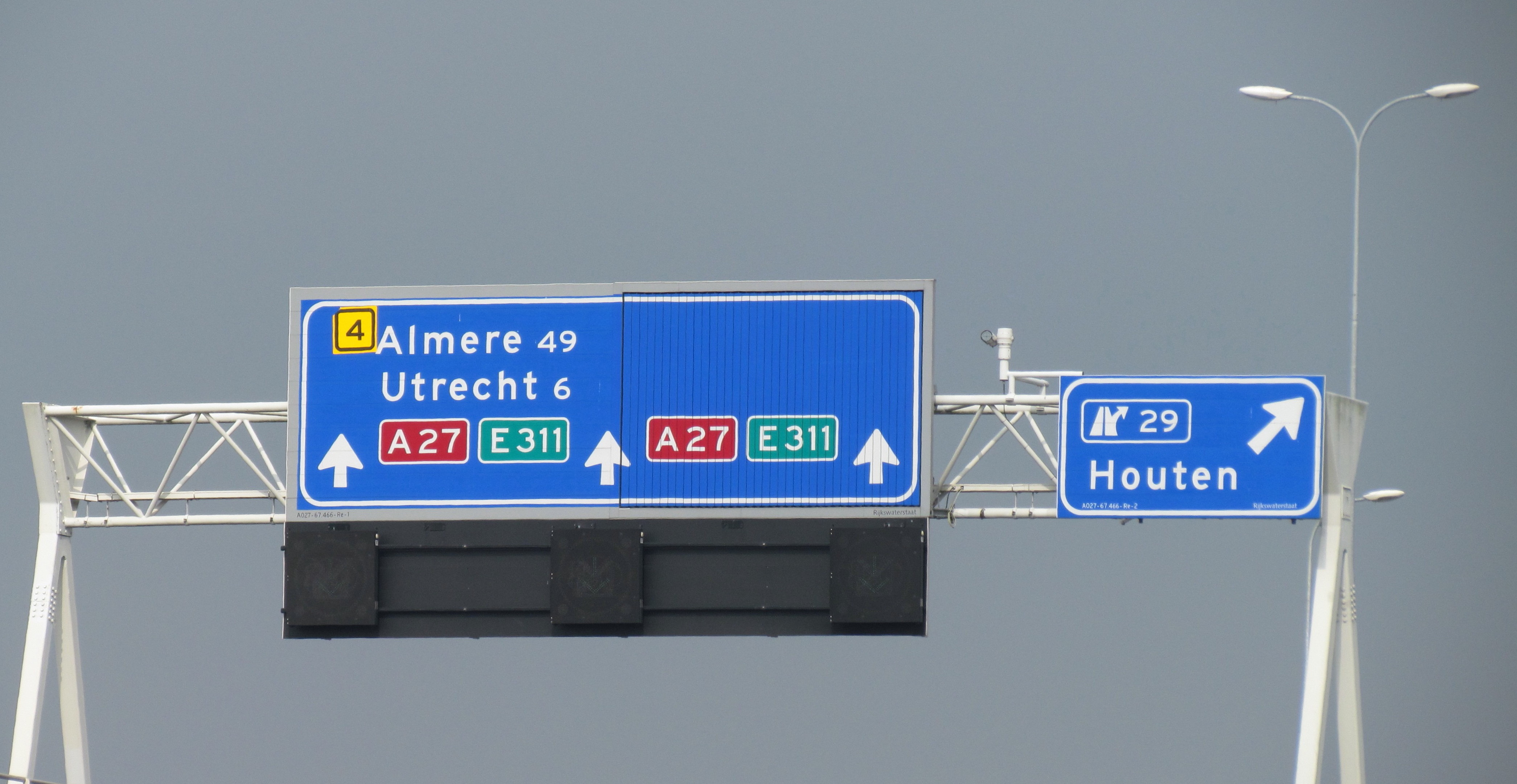
Near Houten, Netherlands

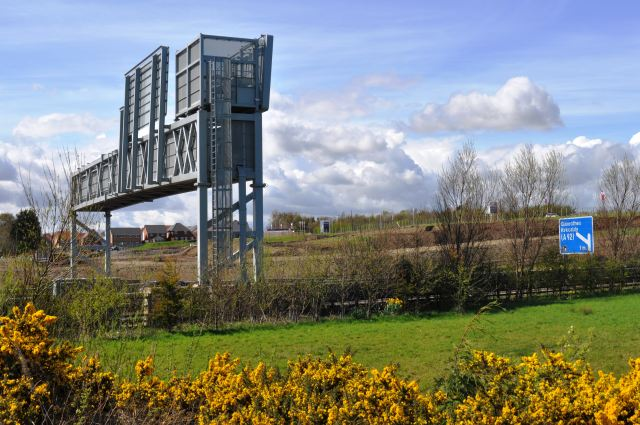
Gantry in the United Kingdom, with access for maintenance

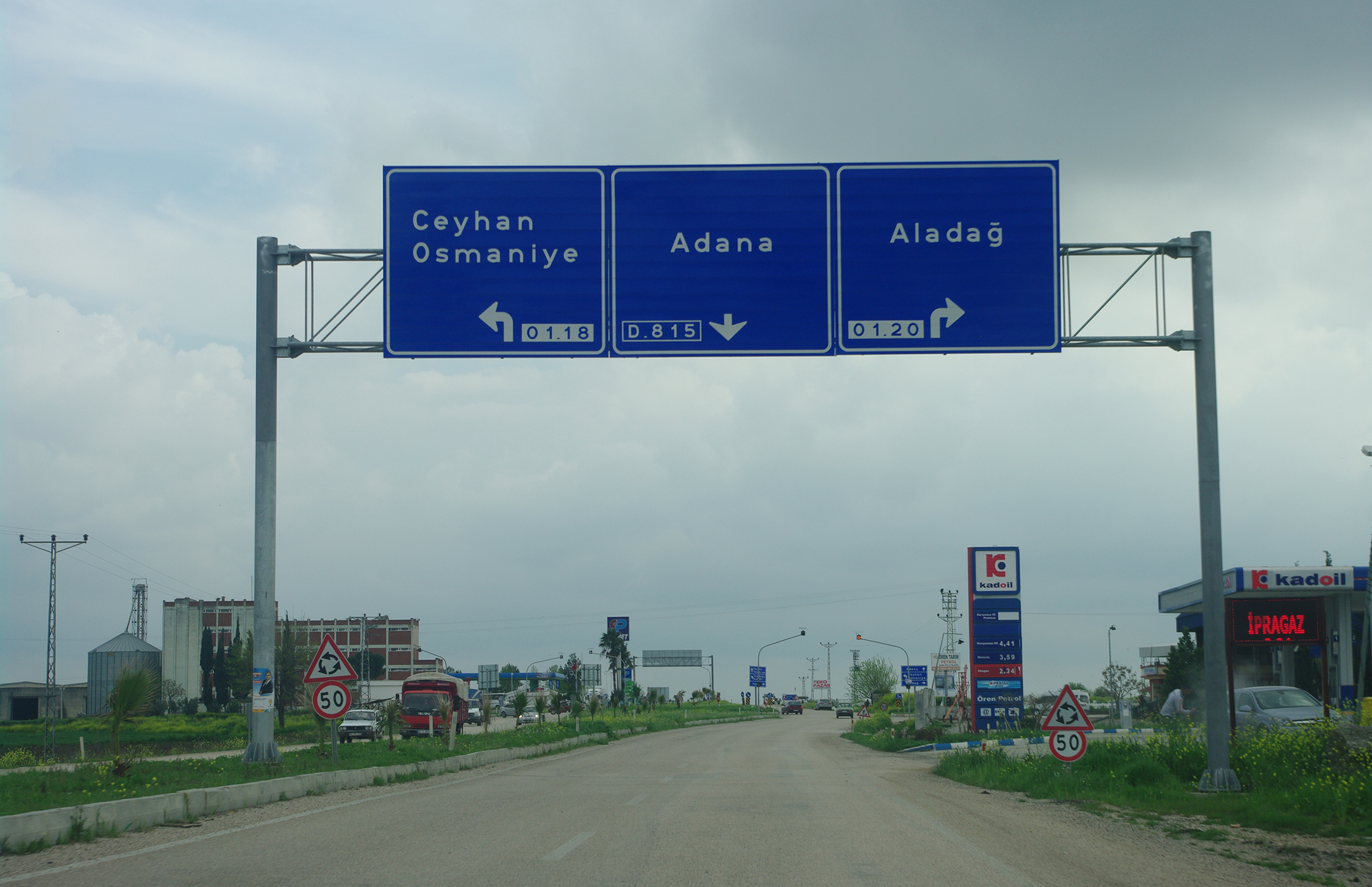
On the D.815 road in Turkey

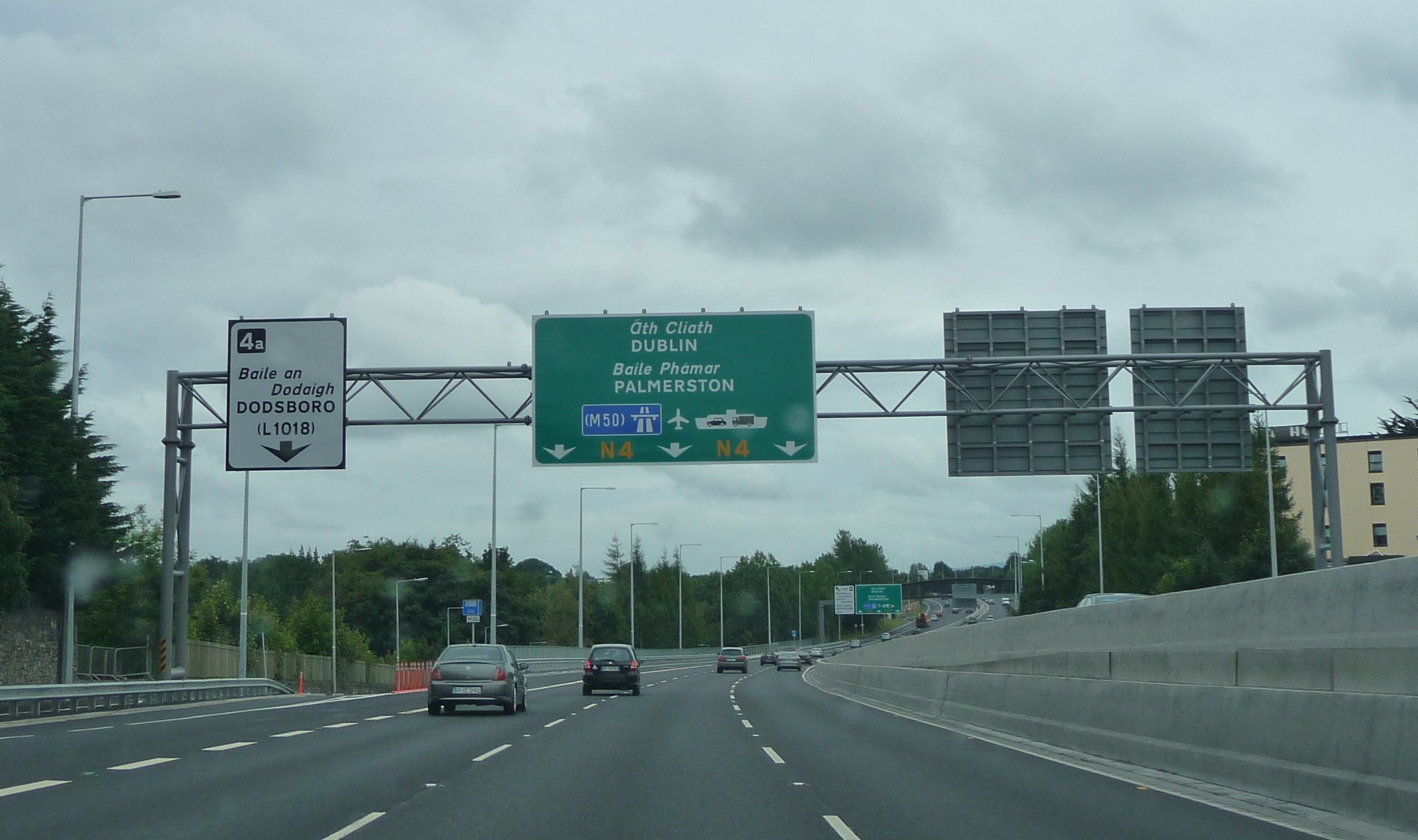
Super-span gantry near Dublin

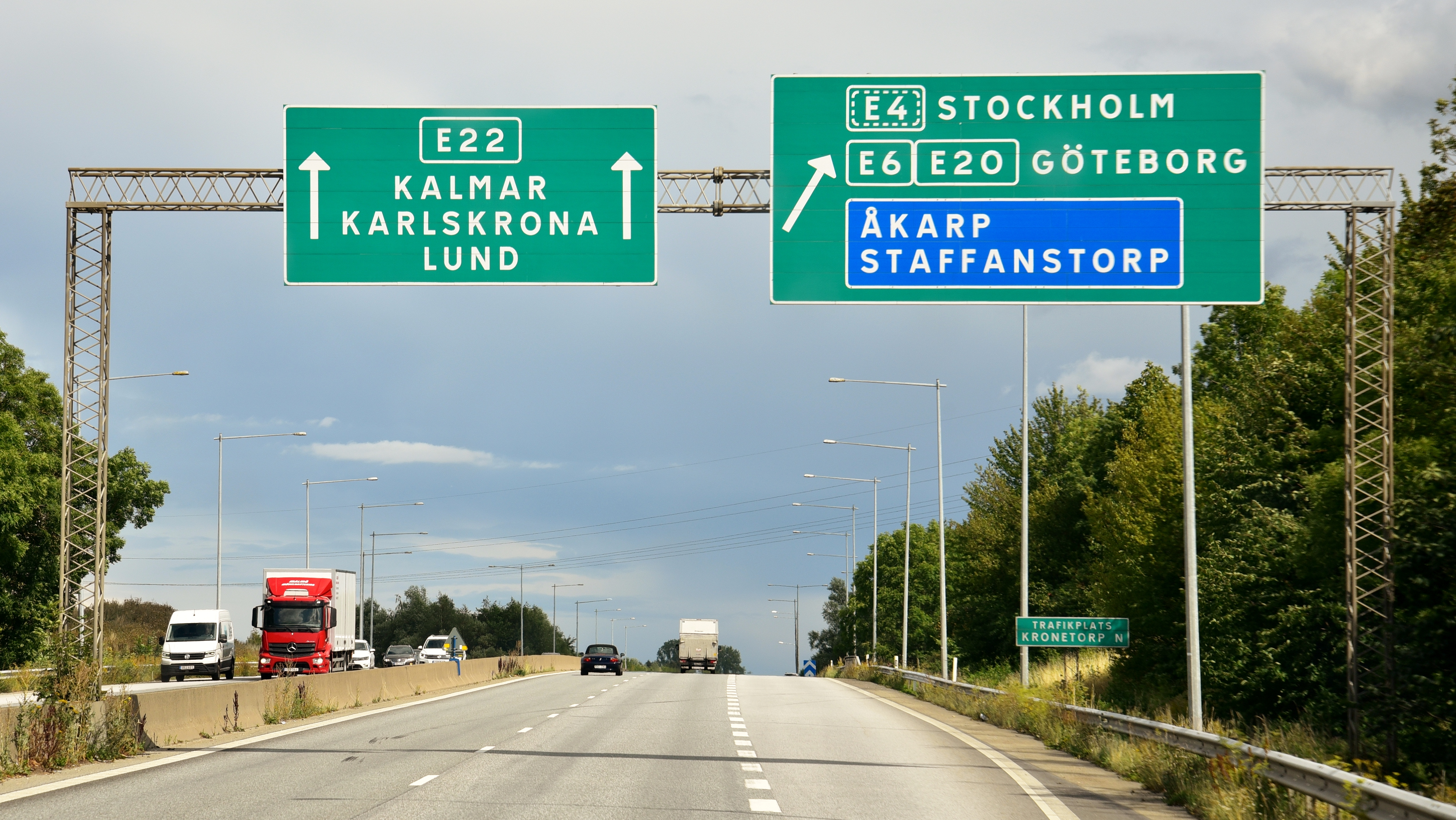
Near Malmö, Sweden
- T-shaped, butterfly or pedestal – signs are mounted onto a T-shaped structure
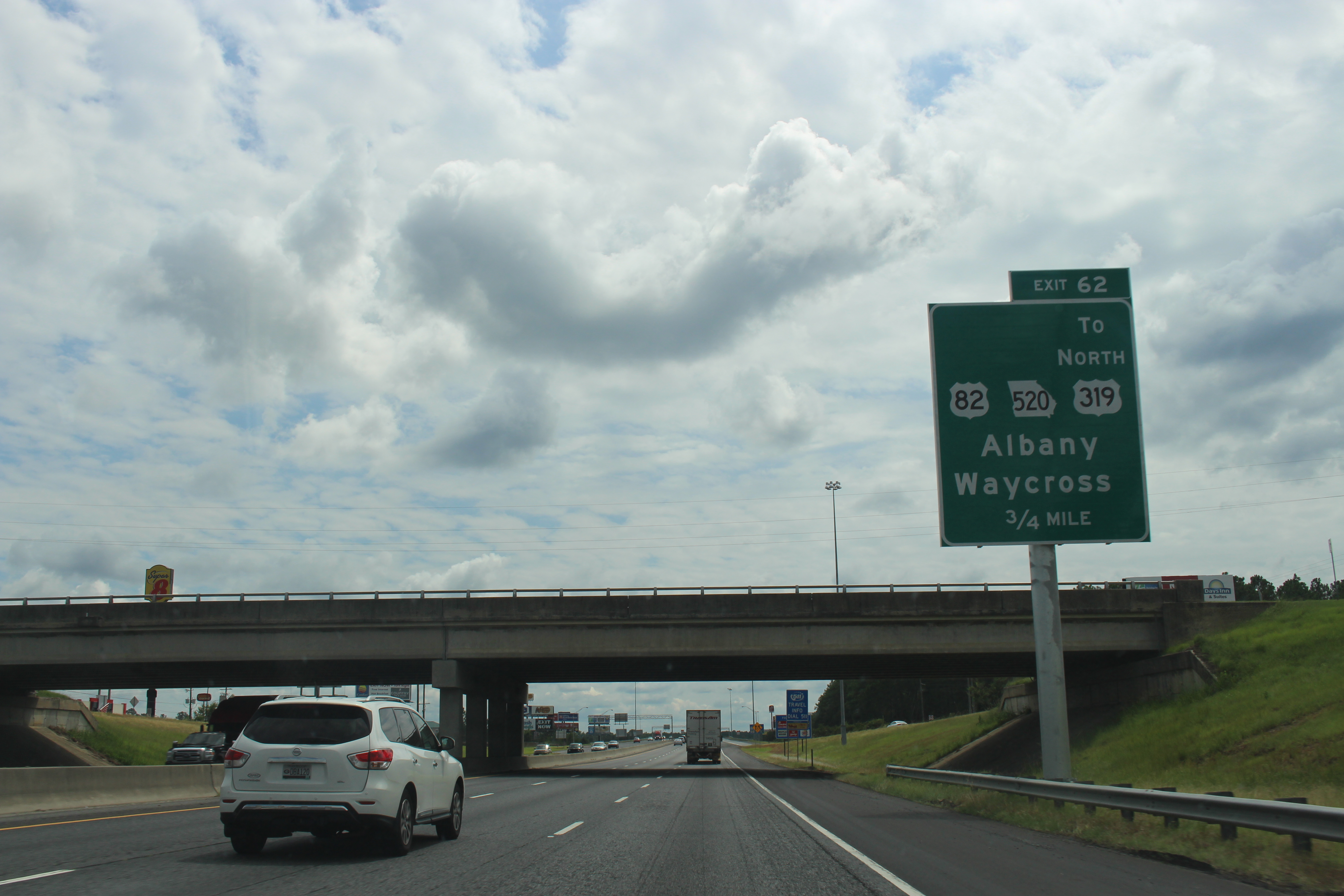
Pedestal gantry sign in Georgia

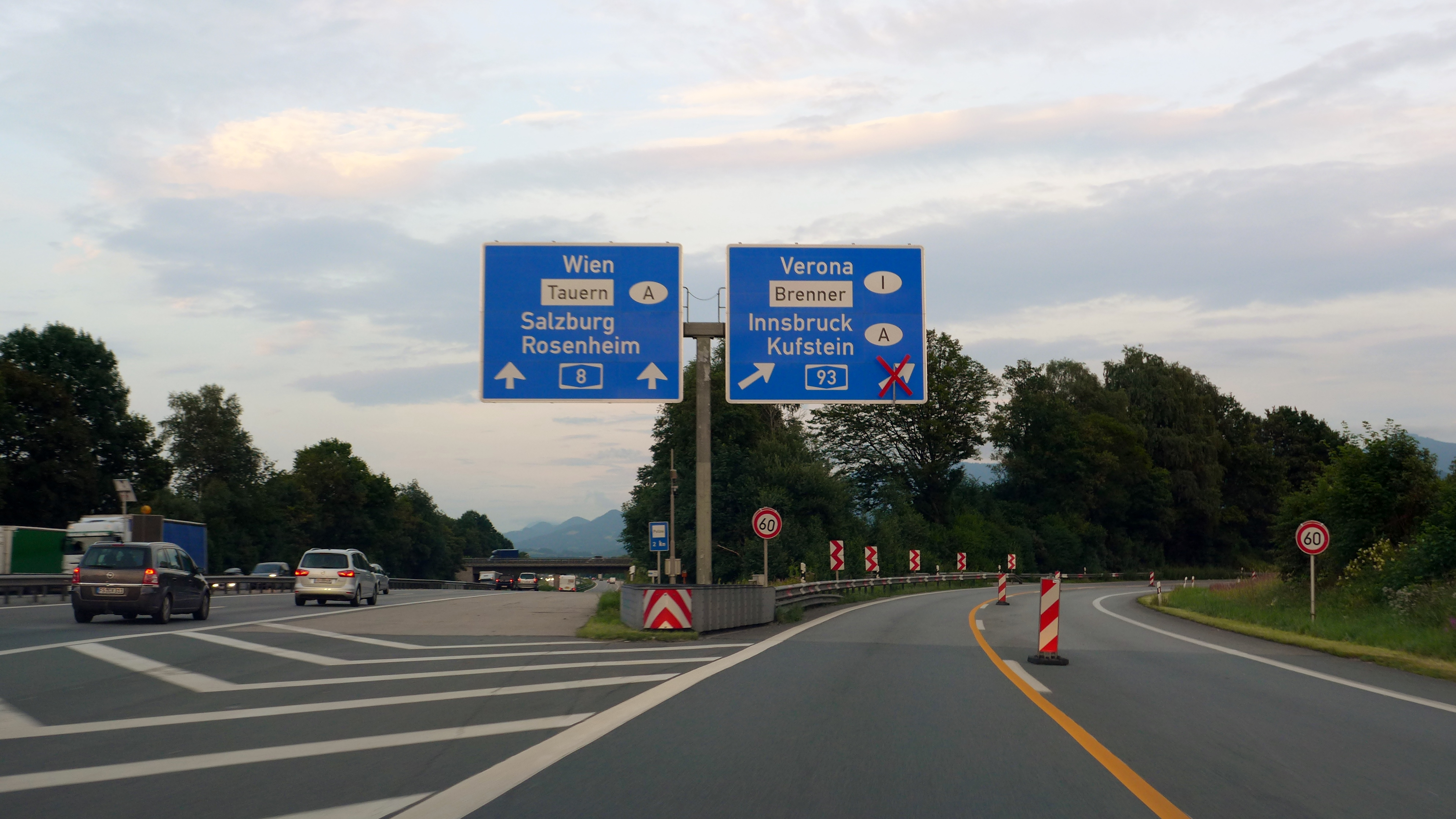
Butterfly gantry near Raubling, Germany

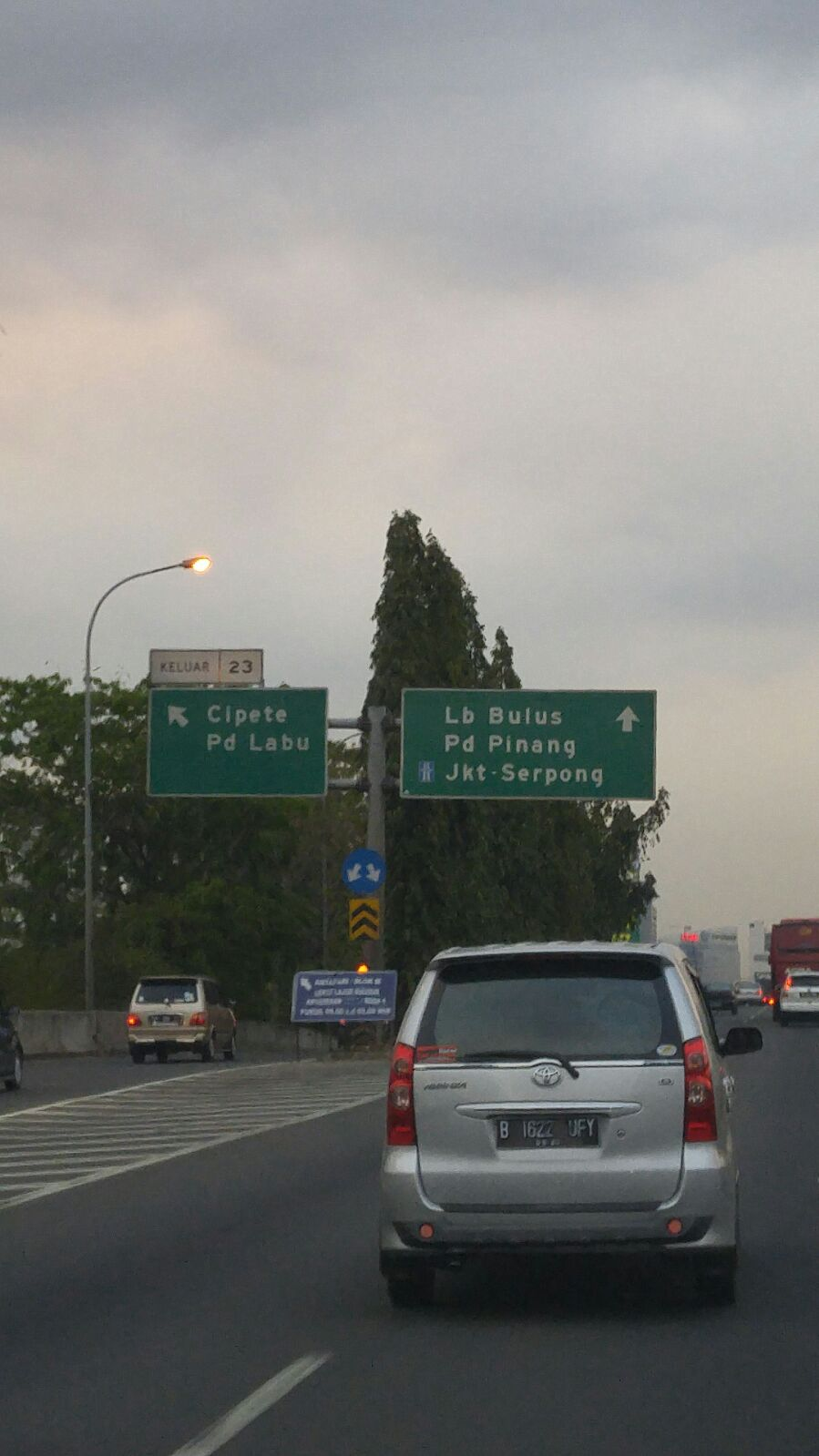
On the Jakarta Outer Ring Road

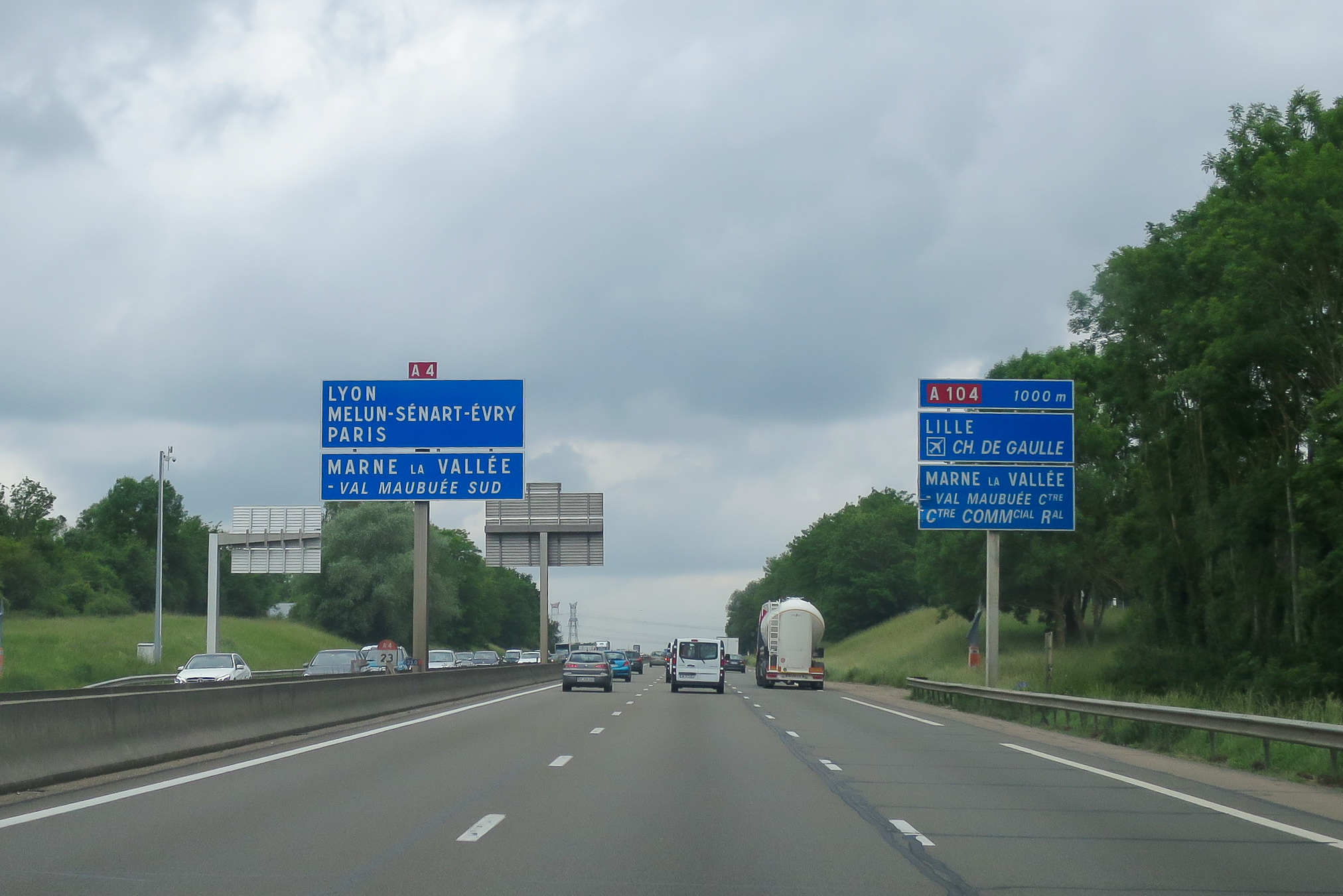
Gantries placed on either side of the carriageway on the A4 autoroute, France
- Tubular pipes – may be round or square in shape
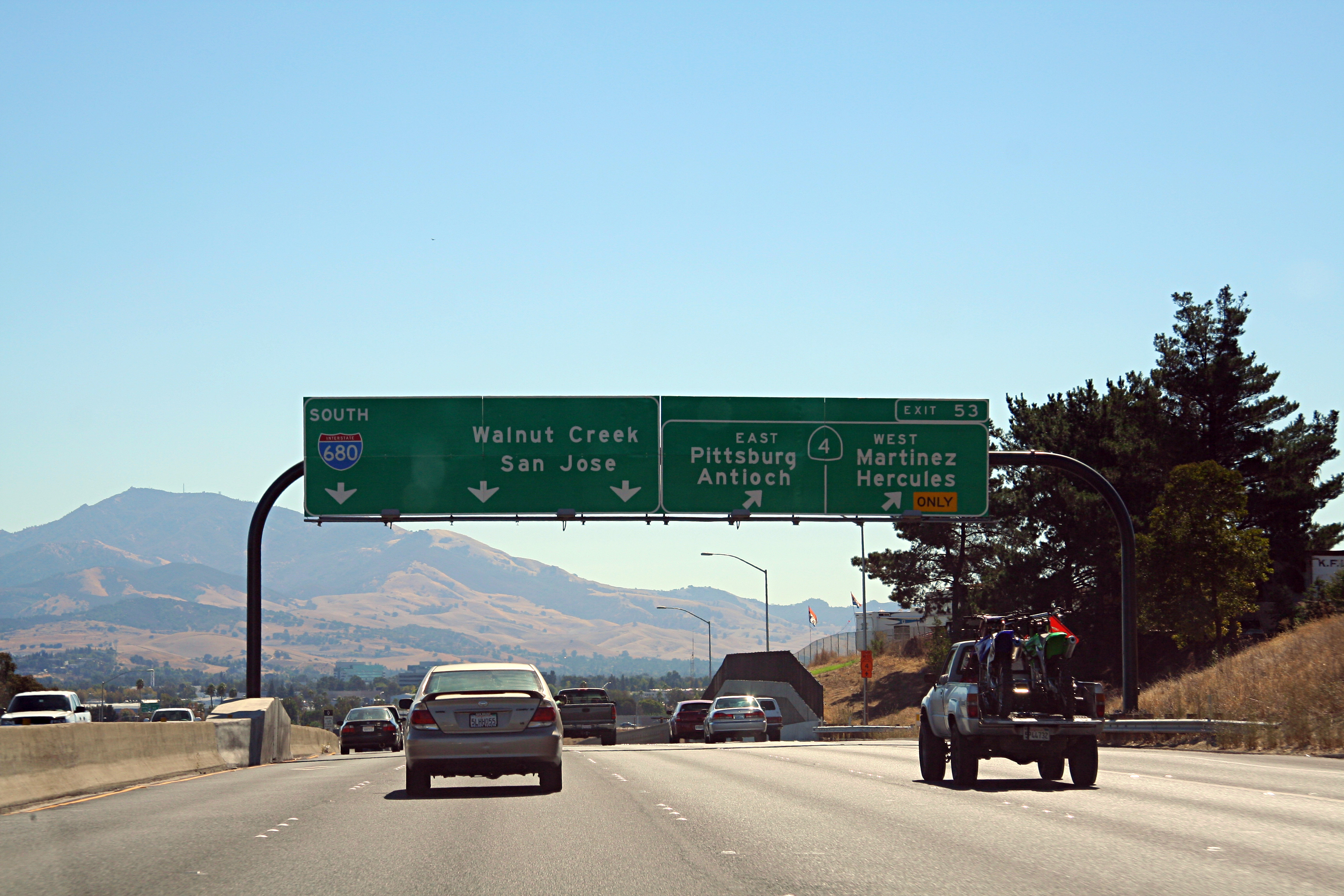
A tubular piped (monotube) gantry in California

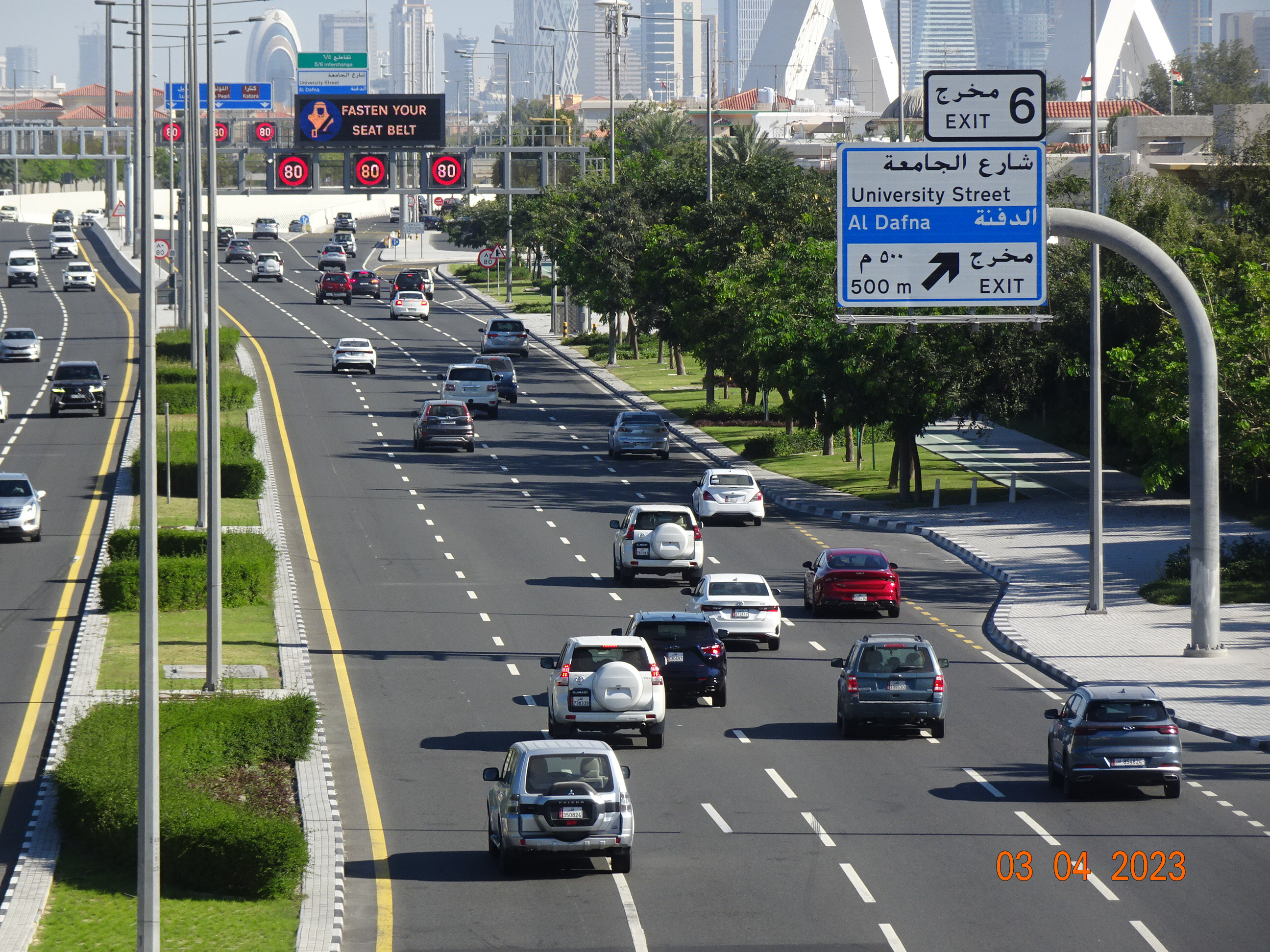
Cantilevered gantry in Doha, Qatar

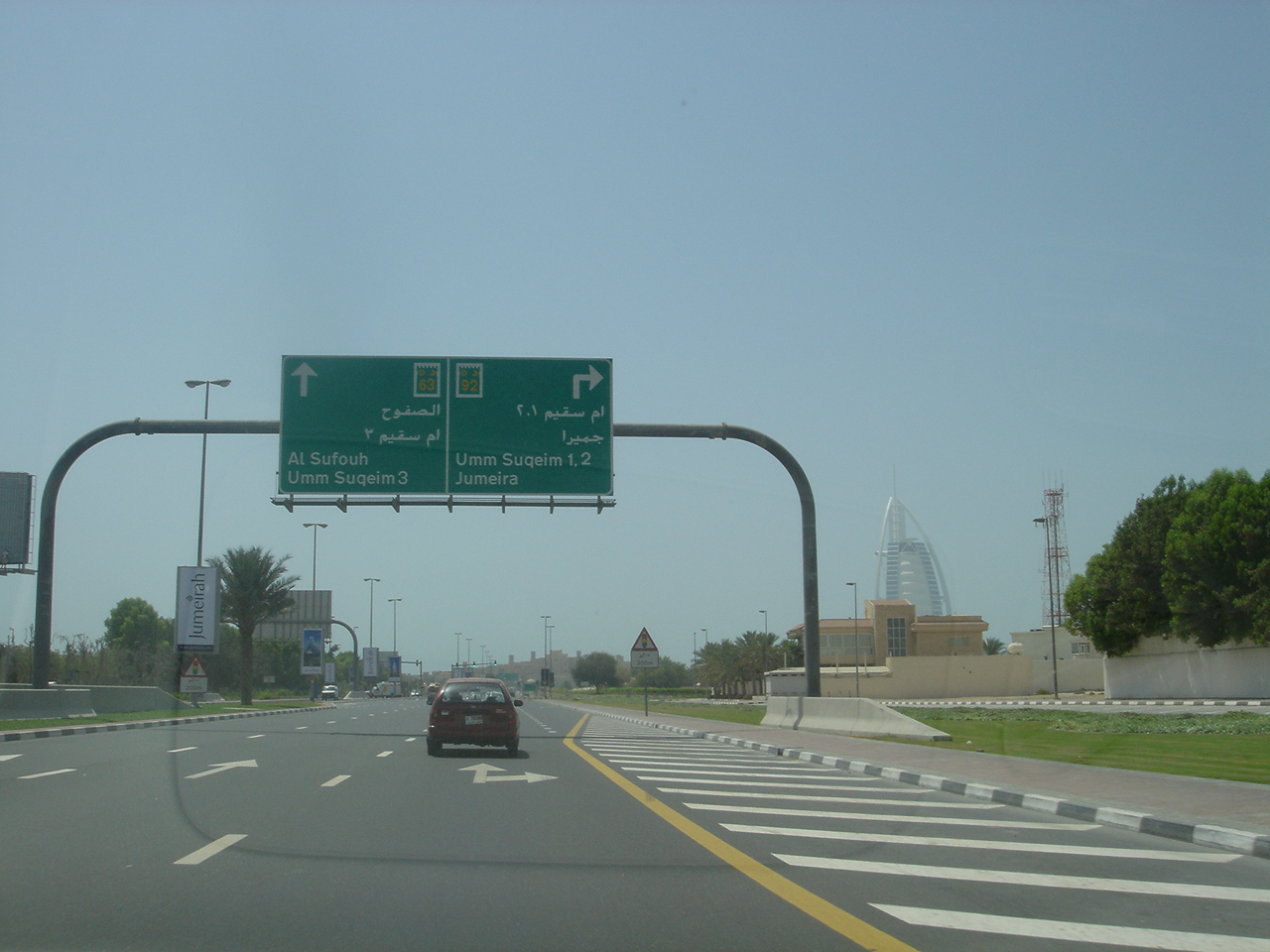
In Dubai

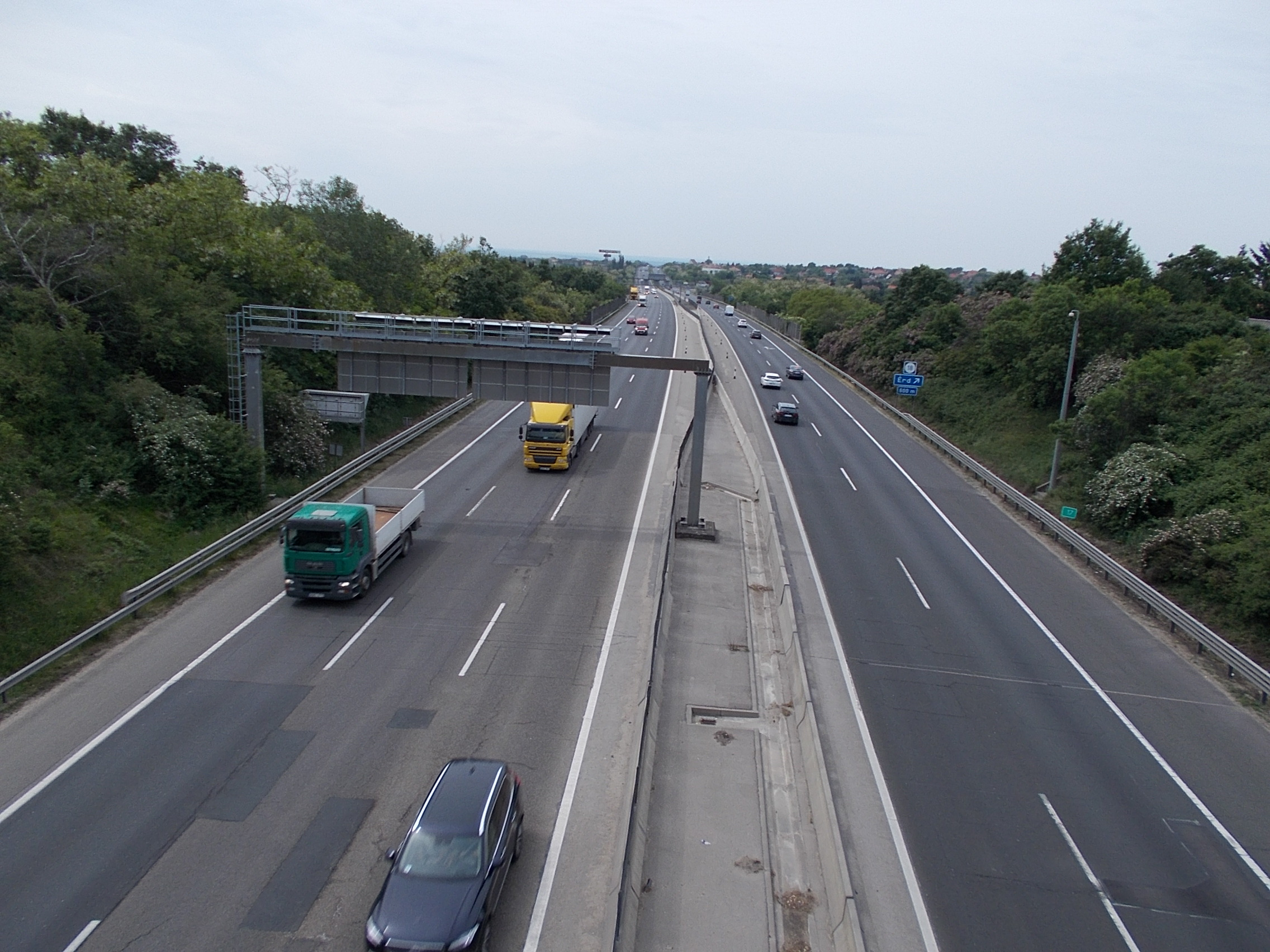
Rear view of a gantry in Hungary, with access for maintenance

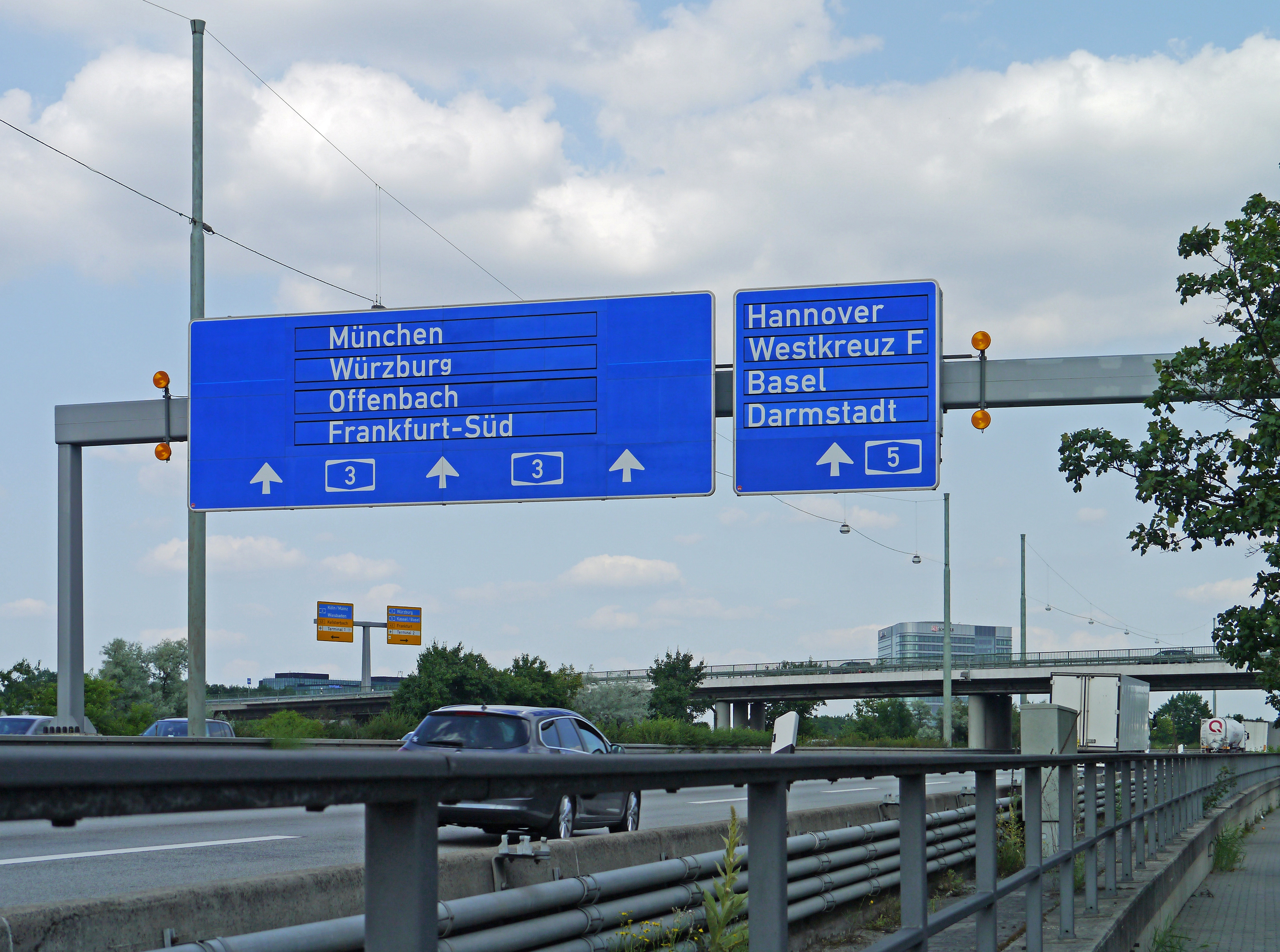
Near Frankfurt Airport
- Other designs
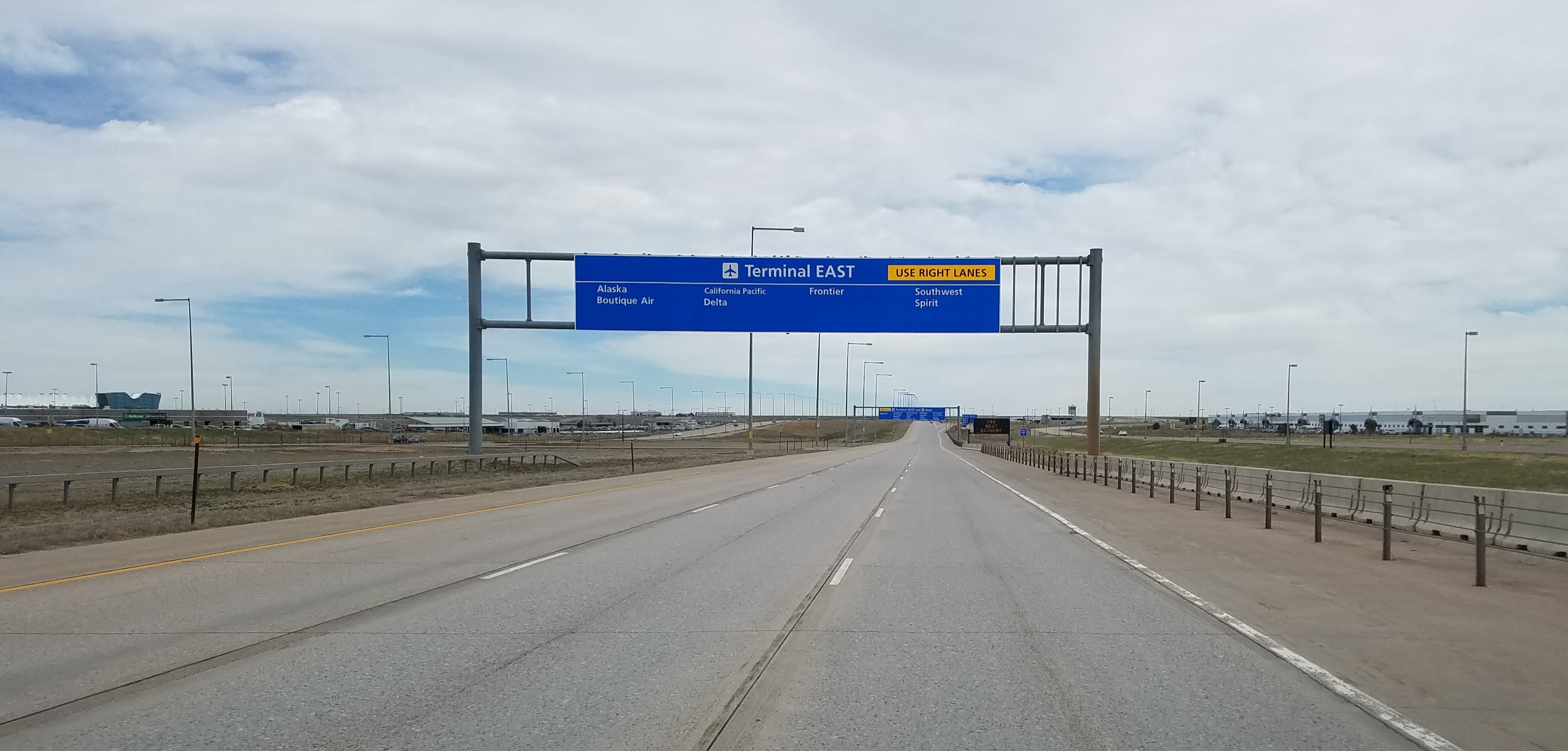
Terminal East gantry sign at Denver International Airport with an empty freeway during the pandemic.

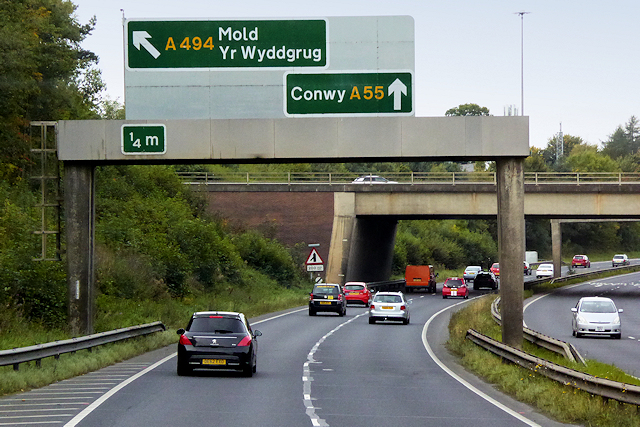
Older UK gantry, with concrete posts, near Ewloe, Wales

== Railway use ==
On railways, gantries span multiple railway tracks and carry either railway signals, overhead lines or both. A signal gantry is also used where to improve the visibility of multiple signals, for example around a sharp curve.

=== Gallery of railway gantries ===
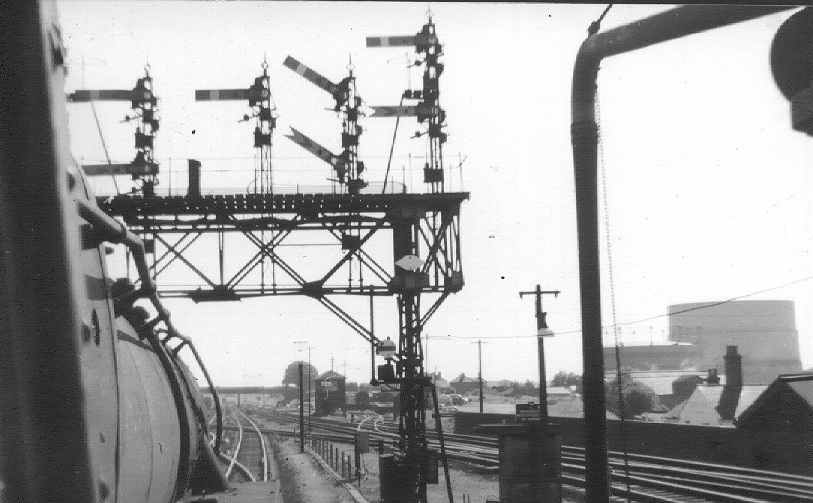
A gantry of British semaphore signals seen from the cab of a steam locomotive

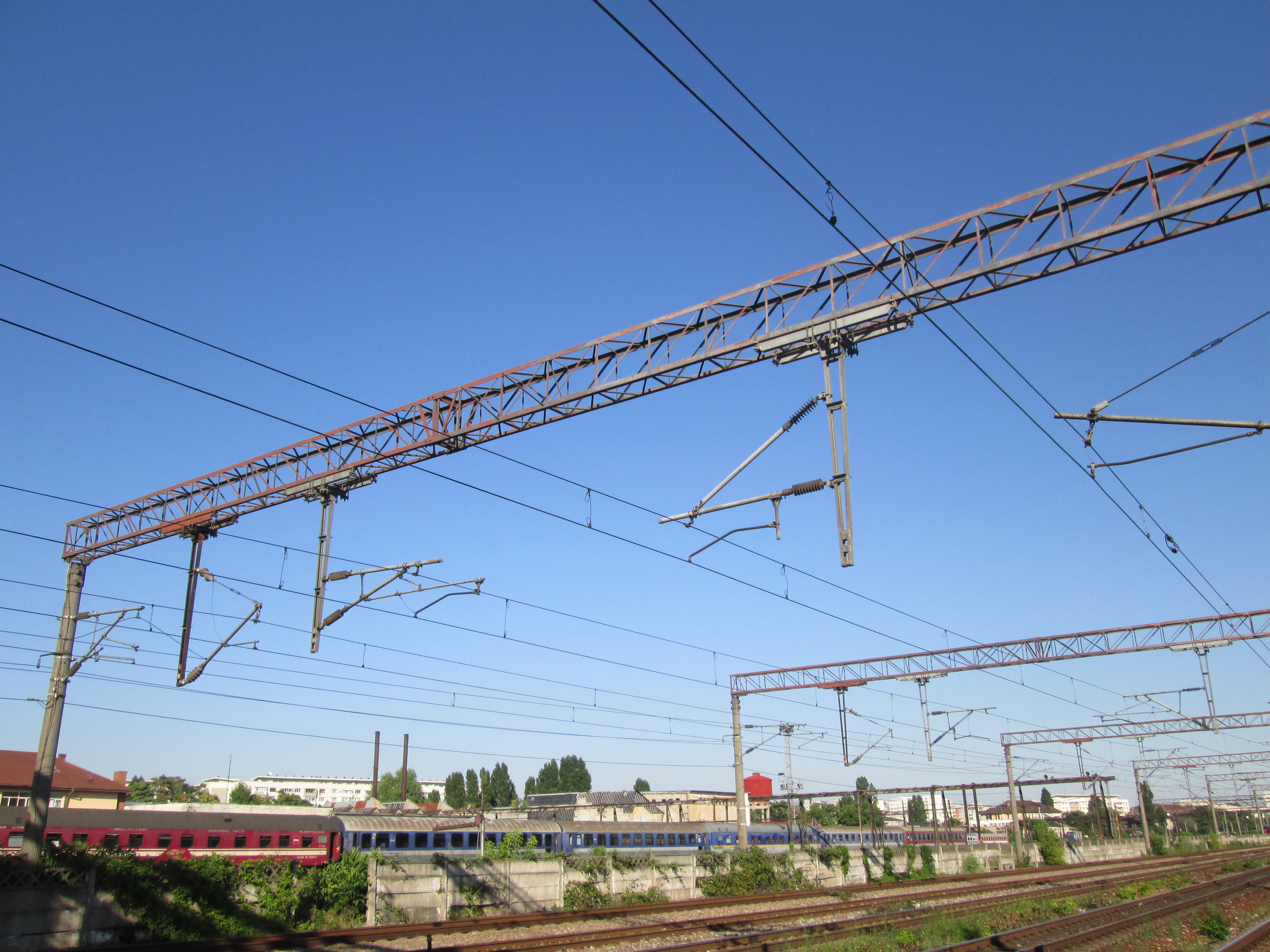
Gantry with old and new suspended equipment at Grivita railway station, Bucharest.

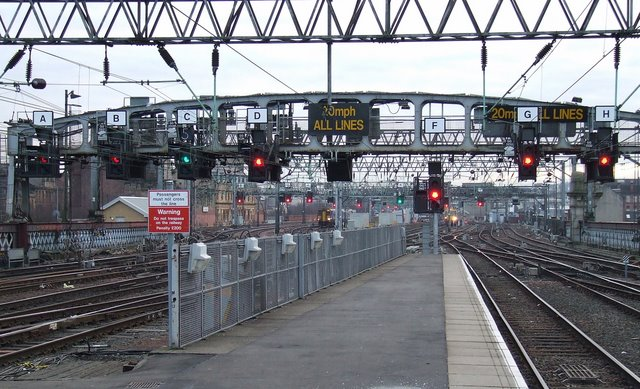
Signal gantry in Glasgow Central Station

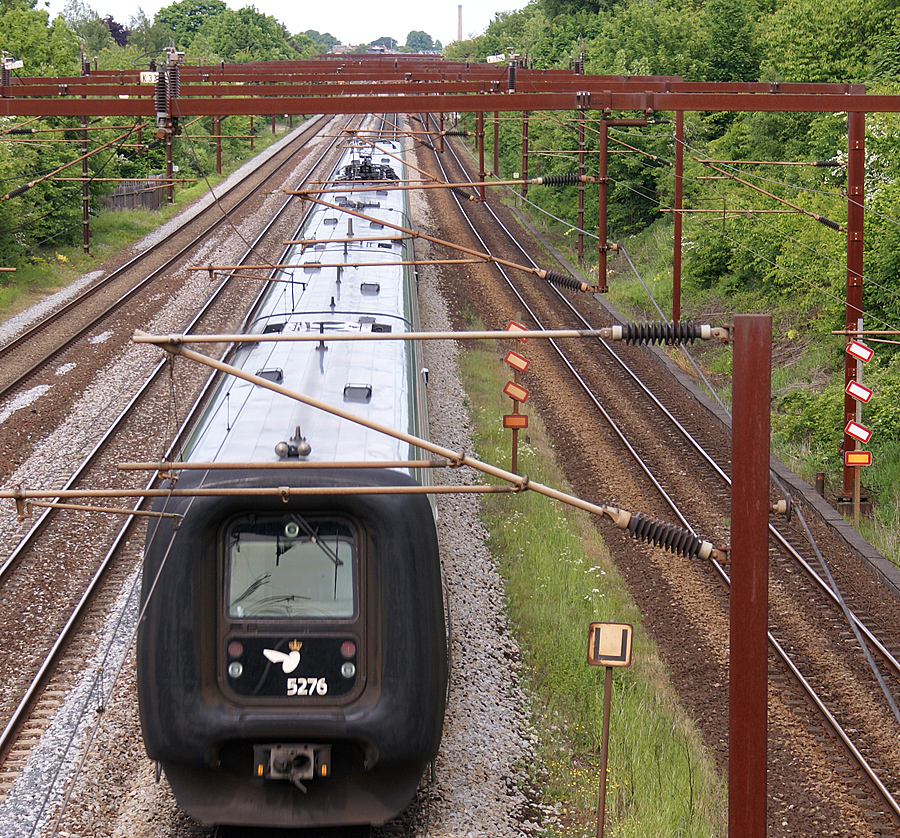
Overhead line gantry in Denmark

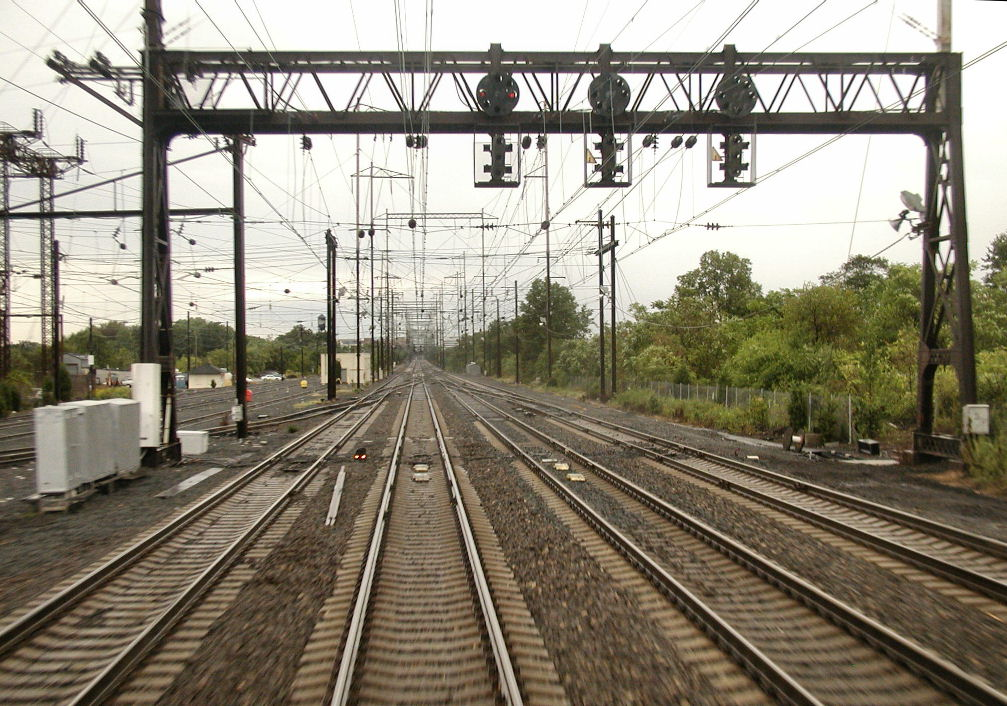
4-track section of Amtrak's Northeast Corridor in New Jersey

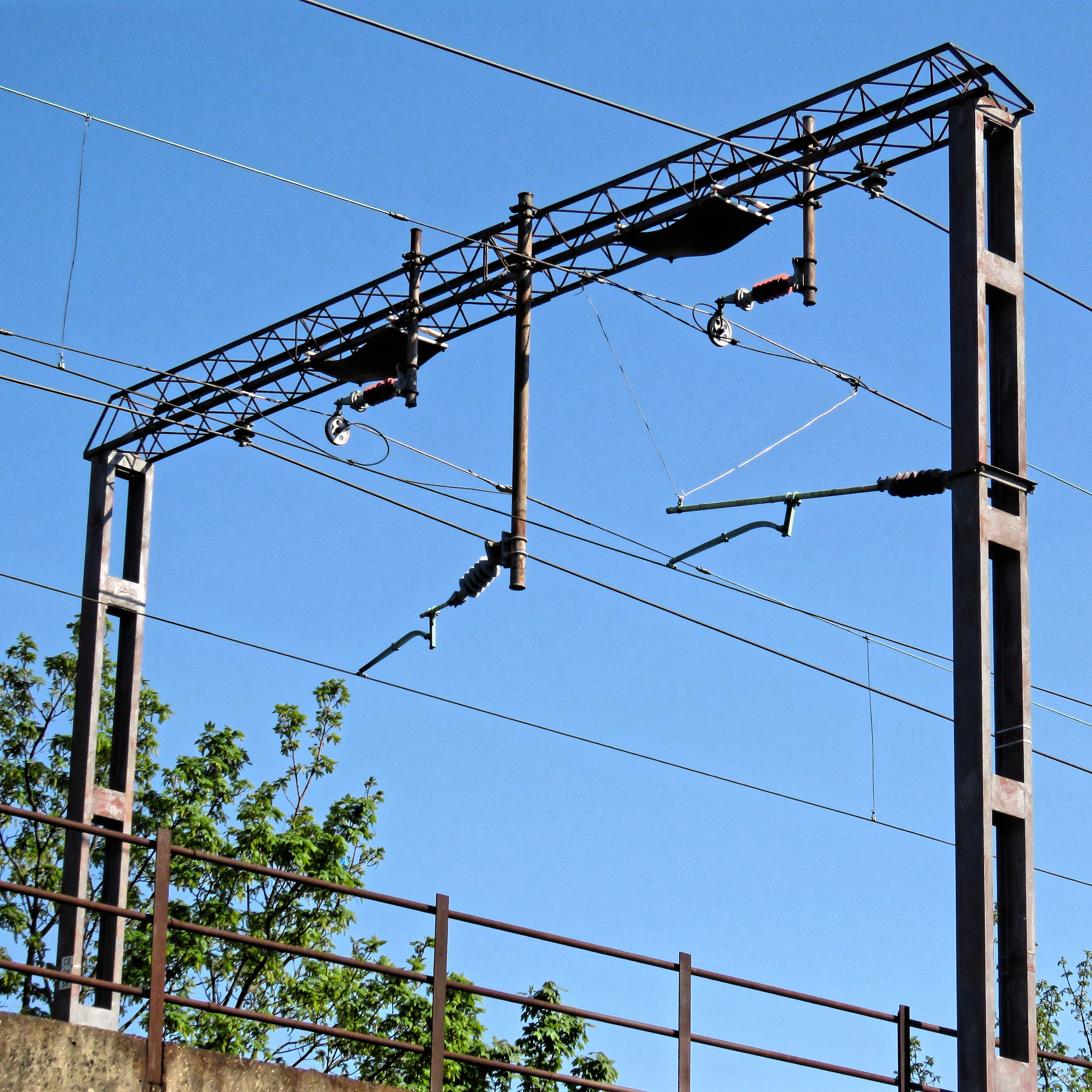
Railway overhead line electification gantry Church Road Tottenham London England

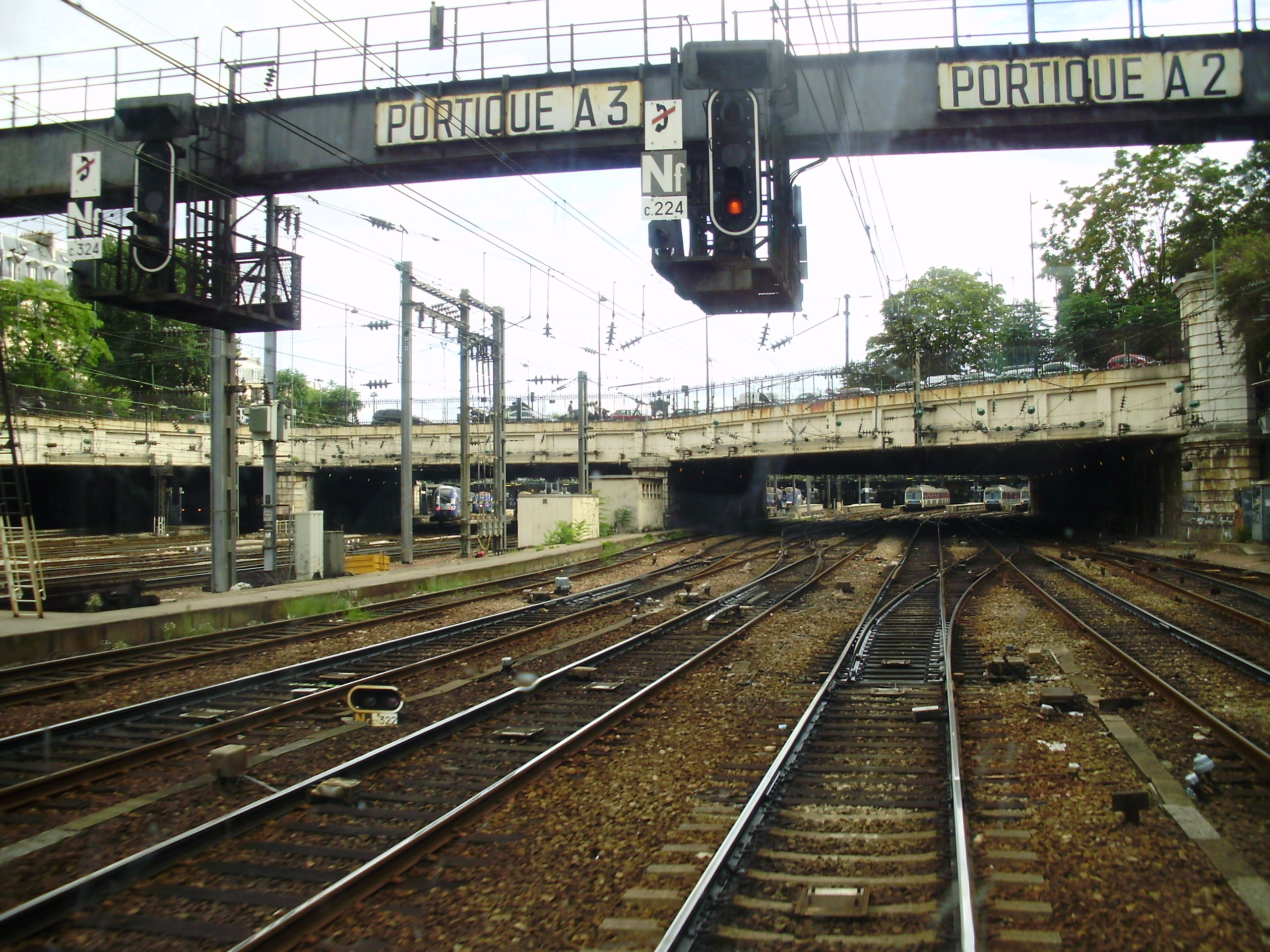
Gantry at Gare Saint-Lazare

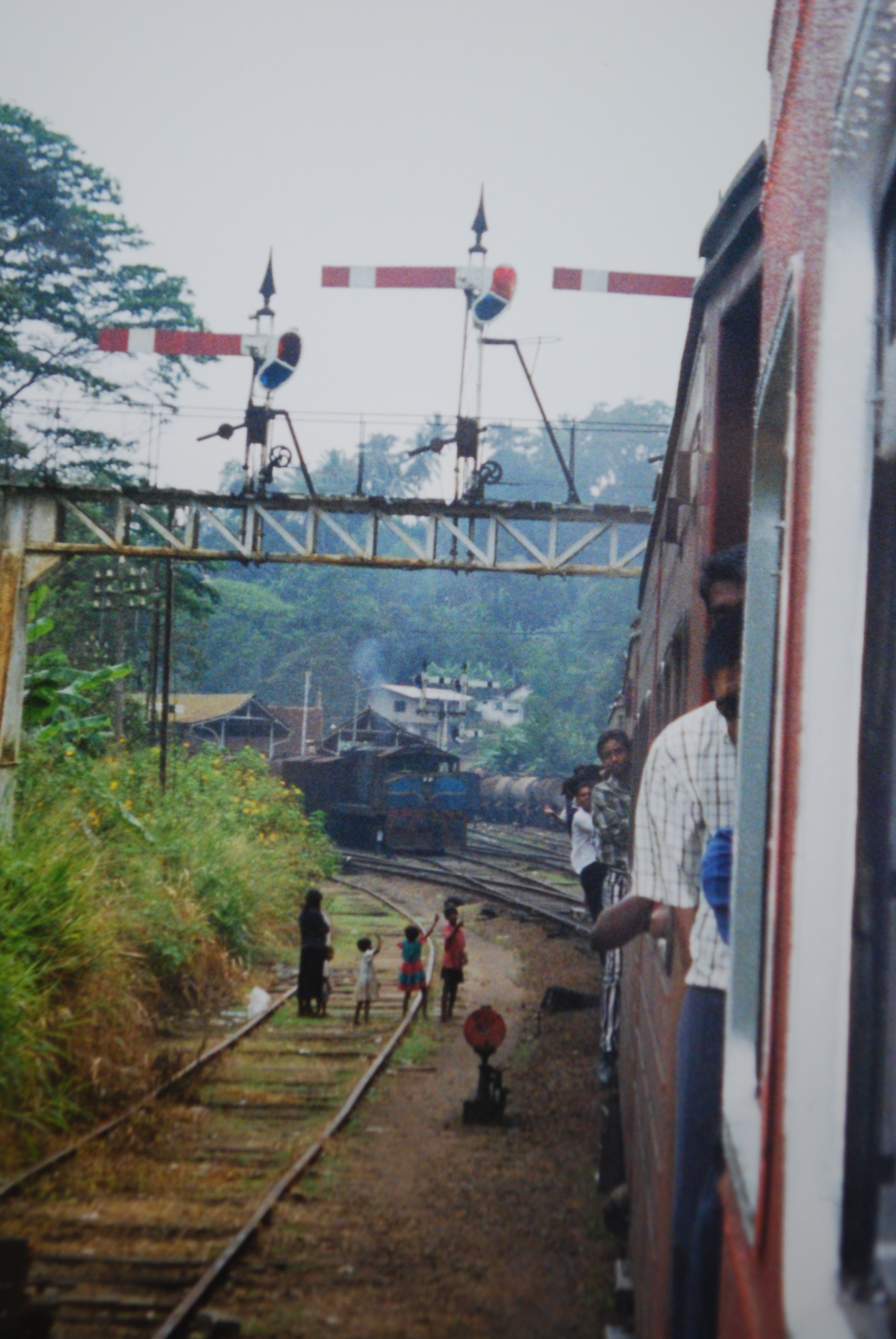
Gantry of Sri Lanka semaphore signals

== See also ==
- Anchor portal
- At-grade intersection
- Controlled-access highway
- Gantry
- Interchange
- Limited-access road
- Railroad signal bridge
- Railway semaphore signal
- Toll road
- Traction current pylon
- Traffic sign
- Utility pole
- Variable-message sign
