= Red Bull–Bora–Hansgrohe =

German cycling team

Red Bull–BORA–Hansgrohe

Team information
- UCI code: RBH
- Registered: Germany
- Founded: 2010
- Discipline: Road
- Status: UCI Continental (2010); UCI Professional Continental (2011–2016); UCI WorldTeam (2017– )
- Bicycles: Focus (2010); Simplon (2011–2012); Fuji Bikes (2013–2014); Argon 18 (2015–2016); Specialized (2017–)
- Website: Team home page

Key personnel
- Team manager: Ralph Denk

Team name history
2010–2012	Team NetApp (APP)
2013–2014	Team NetApp–Endura (TNE)
2015–2016	Bora–Argon 18 (BOA)
2017–2024	Bora–Hansgrohe (BOH)
2024–	Red Bull–Bora–Hansgrohe (RBH)

Red Bull–BORA–hansgrohe (UCI Code: RBH) is a UCI WorldTeam cycling team established in 2010 with a German license, founded and managed by Ralph Denk. The team is based in Raubling, in the Rosenheim district of Upper Bavaria. It is sponsored by global energy drinks brand Red Bull, BORA, a German manufacturer of extractor hoods and cooktops, and Hansgrohe, a bathroom fittings manufacturer. Its aim is "improving the image of road cycling in Germany".

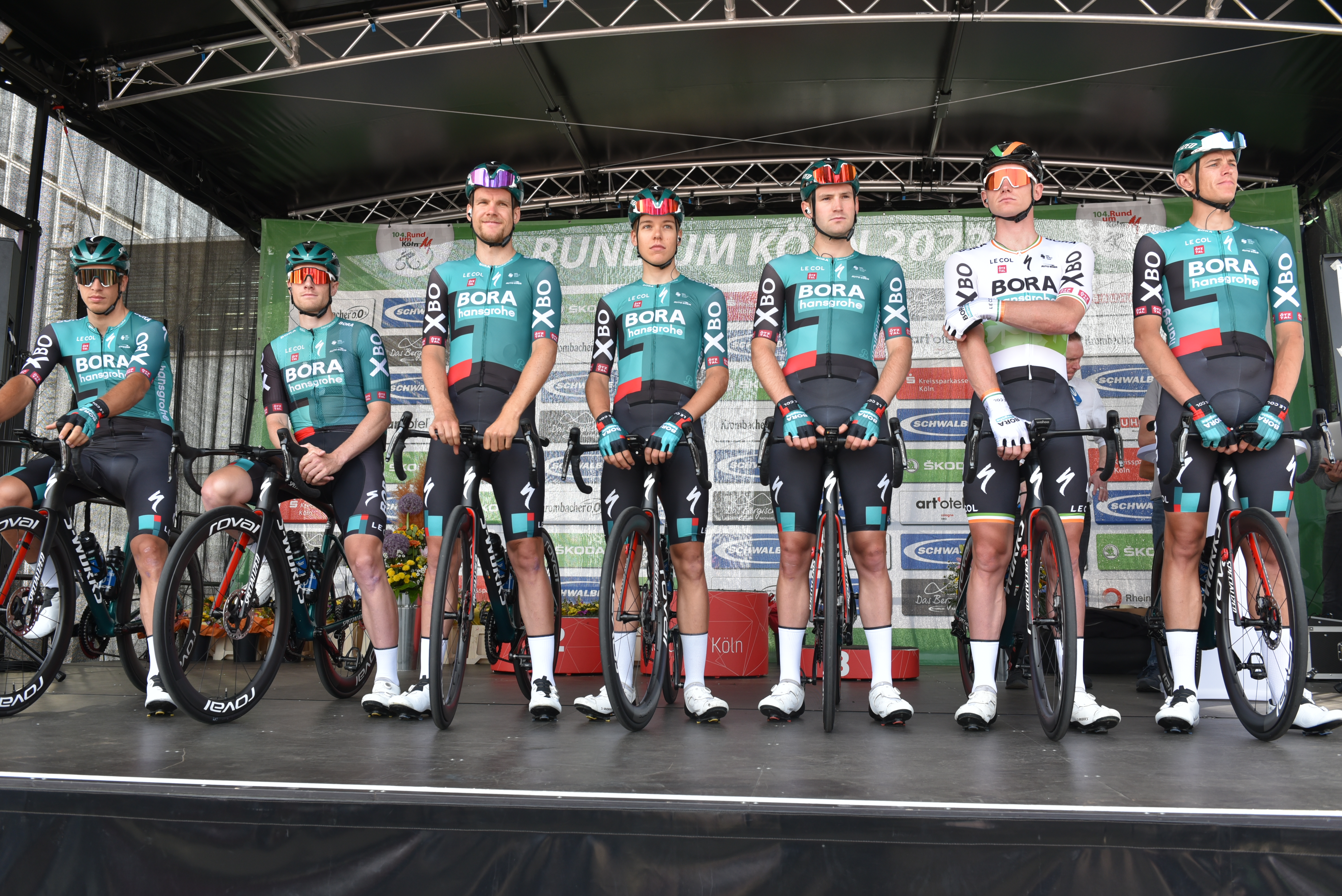
The team at the 2022 Rund um Köln

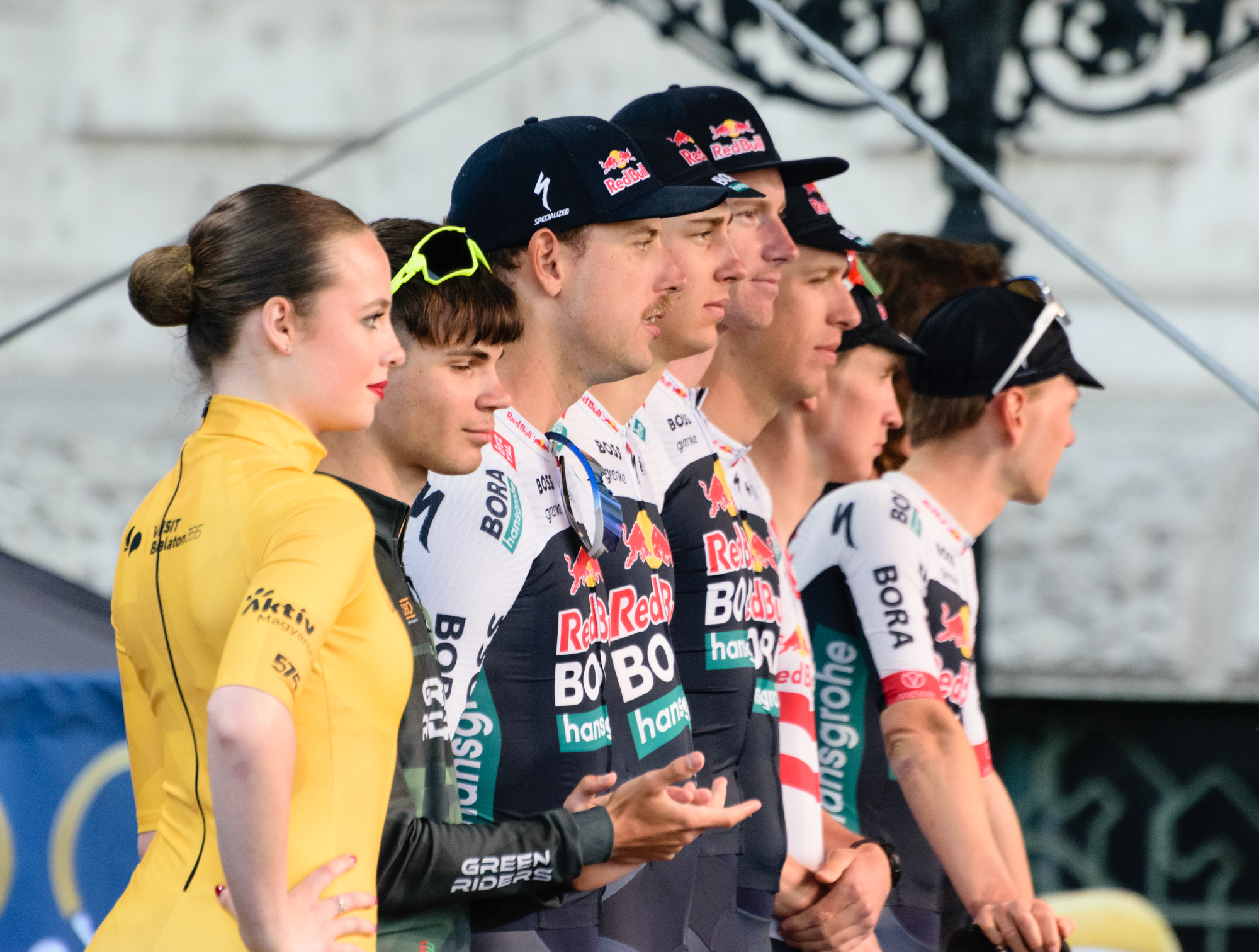
The team at the 2025 Tour de Hongrie

== History ==
The team was formed in 2010 as Team NetApp, a UCI Continental Team with 14 riders. It was promoted to ProContinental Team status after the first season.

For the 2013 season, Team NetApp and British based Endura Racing merged to form NetApp-Endura. The team's 2013 roster consisted of eight riders from Endura, and 12 riders from Team NetApp, as well as NetApp bringing the Pro Continental licence. The eight Endura riders joining were Alexander Wetterhall, Erick Rowsell, Iker Camaño, Jonathan McEvoy, Paul Voß, Russell Downing, Scott Thwaites and Zak Dempster. The nine NetApp riders retained were Jan Barta, Cesare Benedetti, Markus Eichler, Bartosz Huzarski, Blaz Jarc, Leopold Koenig, Daniel Schorn, Andreas Schillinger and Michael Schwarzmann.

On the first rest day of the 2014 Tour de France, 15 July 2014, the team announced they had secured sponsorship with German cooking surface and extractor manufacturer BORA. The team for 2015 onwards, thus becoming known as Team BORA. BORA became the first German team with a German title sponsor in the professional peloton since 2010. Team manager Ralph Denk expressed hope that BORA's backing would help the team achieve their aim of joining the UCI World Tour by 2017.

After the end of the 2014 Tour de France, it was announced that starting in 2015 the team would ride bicycles from Canadian company Argon 18 which would also be the team's second title sponsor. During this relationship, a glass kitchen was installed allowing fans to watch the chef, like a zoo, and advertise the Bora air extractor.

In late June 2016, days before the 2016 Tour de France, the team announced that from 2017 the team name would change from Bora-Argon 18 to Bora–Hansgrohe. Hansgrohe is a bathroom products manufacturer with previous involvement in cyclo-cross, recently sponsoring the Superprestige series. Following the announcement that Peter Sagan would join the team on a three-year deal from 2017, Specialized Bicycle Components announced in August 2016 that they would replace Argon 18 as the team's bike sponsor, having also agreed to a three-year agreement to supply the team's bicycles, helmets, shoes, tires, and wheels.

On 1 August 2017, the team announced the signings of Peter Kennaugh on a two-year deal and Daniel Oss for the 2018 season. As of 2018 approximately 95% of funding comes from sponsorship. In order to develop, team manager Denk aims to reduce this to 50%.

In January 2024 Austrian Federal Competition Authority (FCA) announced Red Bull GmbH's planned acquisition of a controlling interests of 51% in RD pro cycling GmbH & Co KG and RD Beteiligungs GmbH, the owner of BORA-Hansgrohe.

The FCA approved the acquisition on Monday 29 January 2024. Bora-Hansgrohe's manager Ralph Denk stated "the foundations of our partnership with Red Bull are now officially in place. This is the green light we've been waiting for to go ahead with the formalities and many specific parts of the collaboration."

The team was officially renamed Red Bull–BORA–hansgrohe ahead of the 2024 Tour de France.

== Team roster ==
As of 11 August 2026.

Rider	Date of birth
Giovanni Aleotti (ITA)	25 May 1999 (age 27)
Adrien Boichis (FRA)	2 January 2003 (age 23)
Mattia Cattaneo (ITA)	25 October 1990 (age 36)
Nico Denz (GER)	15 February 1994 (age 32)
Jarrad Drizners (AUS)	31 May 1999 (age 27)
Haimar Etxeberria (ESP)	8 September 2003 (age 23)
Remco Evenepoel (BEL)	25 January 2001 (age 25)
Finn Fisher-Black (NZL)	21 December 2001 (age 24)
Alexander Hajek (AUT)	19 July 2003 (age 23)
Emil Herzog (GER)	6 October 2004 (age 22)
Jai Hindley (AUS)	5 May 1996 (age 30)
Florian Lipowitz (GER)	21 September 2000 (age 26)
Arne Marit (BEL)	21 January 1999 (age 27)
Daniel Martínez (COL)	25 April 1996 (age 30)
Jordi Meeus (BEL)	1 July 1998 (age 28)

Rider	Date of birth
Gianni Moscon (ITA)	20 April 1994 (age 32)
Giulio Pellizzari (ITA)	21 November 2003 (age 22)
Laurence Pithie (NZL)	17 July 2002 (age 24)
Primož Roglič (SLO)	29 October 1989 (age 37)
Callum Thornley (GBR)	5 August 2003 (age 23)
Jan Tratnik (SLO)	23 February 1990 (age 36)
Luke Tuckwell (AUS)	21 June 2004 (age 22)
Mick van Dijke (NED)	15 March 2000 (age 26)
Tim van Dijke (NED)	15 March 2000 (age 26)
Maxim Van Gils (BEL)	25 November 1999 (age 26)
Danny van Poppel (NED)	26 July 1993 (age 33)
Gianni Vermeersch (BEL)	19 November 1992 (age 34)
Aleksandr Vlasov (RUS)	23 April 1996 (age 30)
Frederik Wandahl (DEN)	9 May 2001 (age 25)
Ben Zwiehoff (GER)	22 February 1994 (age 32)

== National, continental, world and Olympic champions ==
2011
South Africa Time Trial, Daryl Impey
2012
Czech Republic Time Trial, Jan Bárta
2013
Czech Republic Time Trial, Jan Bárta
Czech Republic Road Race, Jan Bárta
2014
Czech Republic Time Trial, Jan Bárta
2015
Czech Republic Time Trial, Jan Bárta
German Road Race, Emanuel Buchmann
2016
Portuguese Road Race, José Mendes
2017
Latvia Time Trial, Aleksejs Saramotins
Czech Republic Time Trial, Jan Bárta
Austria Road Race, Gregor Mühlberger
Slovak Road Race, Juraj Sagan
German Road Race, Marcus Burghardt
World Road Race, Peter Sagan
2018
Polish Time Trial, Maciej Bodnar
Slovak Road Race, Peter Sagan
Austria Road Race, Lukas Pöstlberger
German Road Race, Pascal Ackermann
2019
Polish Time Trial, Maciej Bodnar
German Road Race, Maximilian Schachmann
Italy Road Race, Davide Formolo
Ireland Road Race, Sam Bennett
Slovak Road Race, Juraj Sagan
Austria Road Race, Patrick Konrad
2020
Slovak Road Race, Juraj Sagan
2021
Polish Time Trial, Maciej Bodnar
Austria Road Race, Patrick Konrad
German Road Race, Maximilian Schachmann
Slovak Road Race, Peter Sagan
Olympic omnium, Matthew Walls
2022
New Zealand Criterium, Shane Archbold
Colombian Road Race, Sergio Higuita
Austria Time Trial, Felix Großschartner
German Road Race, Nils Politt
2023
Ireland Time Trial, Ryan Mullen
German Road Race, Emanuel Buchmann
2024
Colombian Time Trial, Daniel Felipe Martínez

== Doping ==
In July 2017, the team revealed that former rider Ralf Matzka returned an adverse analytical finding for Tamoxifen on March 3, 2016. Matzka did not ride for the team after the Tour of Flanders. Tamoxifen usage can lead to an increase in the concentrations of testosterone within the body.
