= Bora Lüftungstechnik =

German manufacturer of built-in kitchen appliances

Bora Lüftungstechnik GmbH

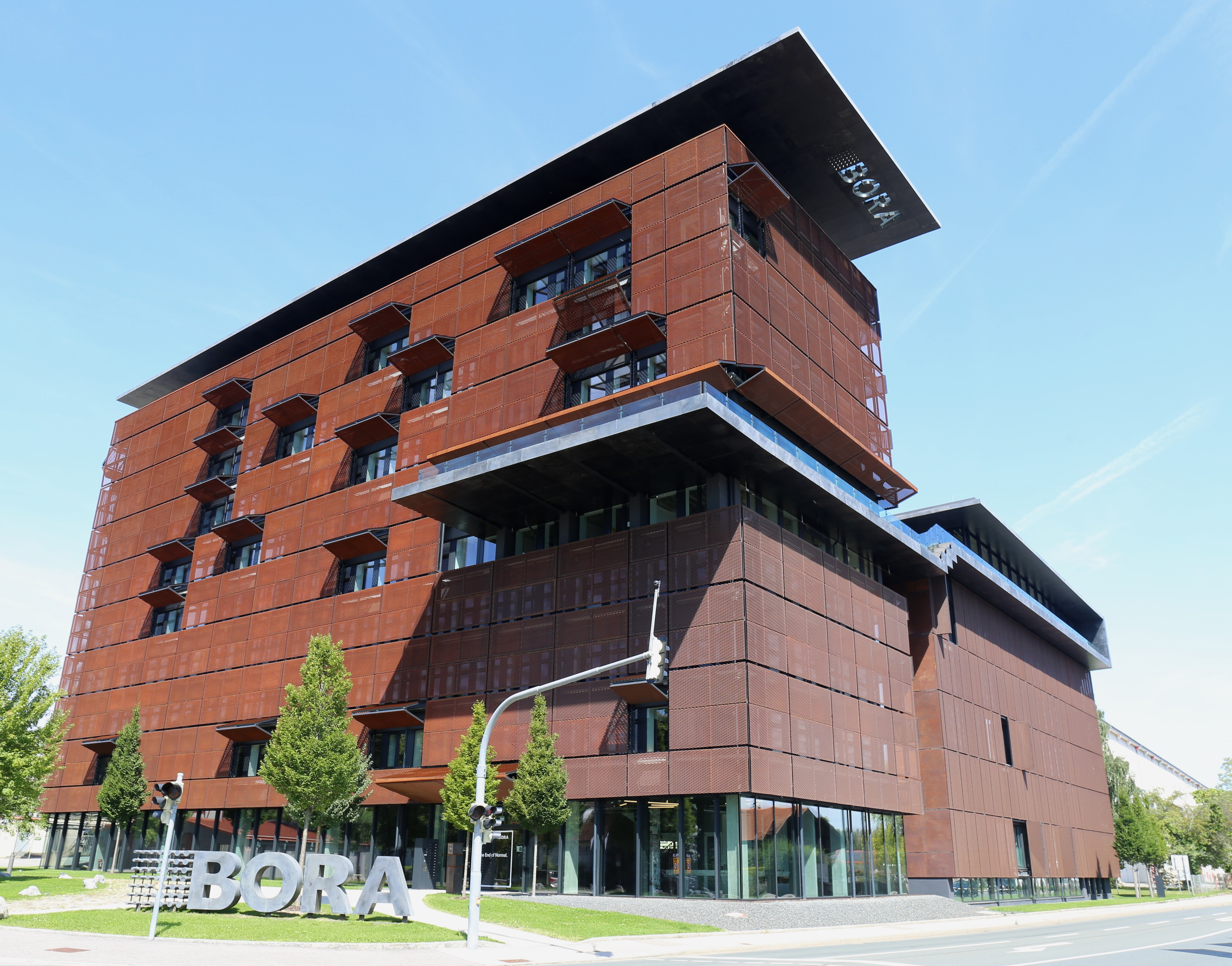
- Bora Lüftungstechnik headquarters in Raubling
- Type: Private
- Industry: Home appliances
- Founded: 2007; 19 years ago
- Founder: Willi Bruckbauer
- Headquarters: Raubling, Germany
- Area served: Worldwide
- Revenue: > €100 million (2022)
- Number of employees: 700 (2025)
- Website: bora.com

Bora Lüftungstechnik GmbH (stylised as BORA) is a German manufacturer of built-in kitchen appliances (cooktop extractor systems, steam ovens, refrigeration and freezing systems and lighting). The company's headquarters are located in Raubling, Bavaria. A branch is located in Niederndorf, Austria. The centralising company is Werkhaus GmbH & Co. KG, also located in Raubling.

The name of the company is named after the Bora fall wind and relates to the Bora cooktop extractor system. The company’s distribution network comprises approx. 8000 retailers across sixty countries.

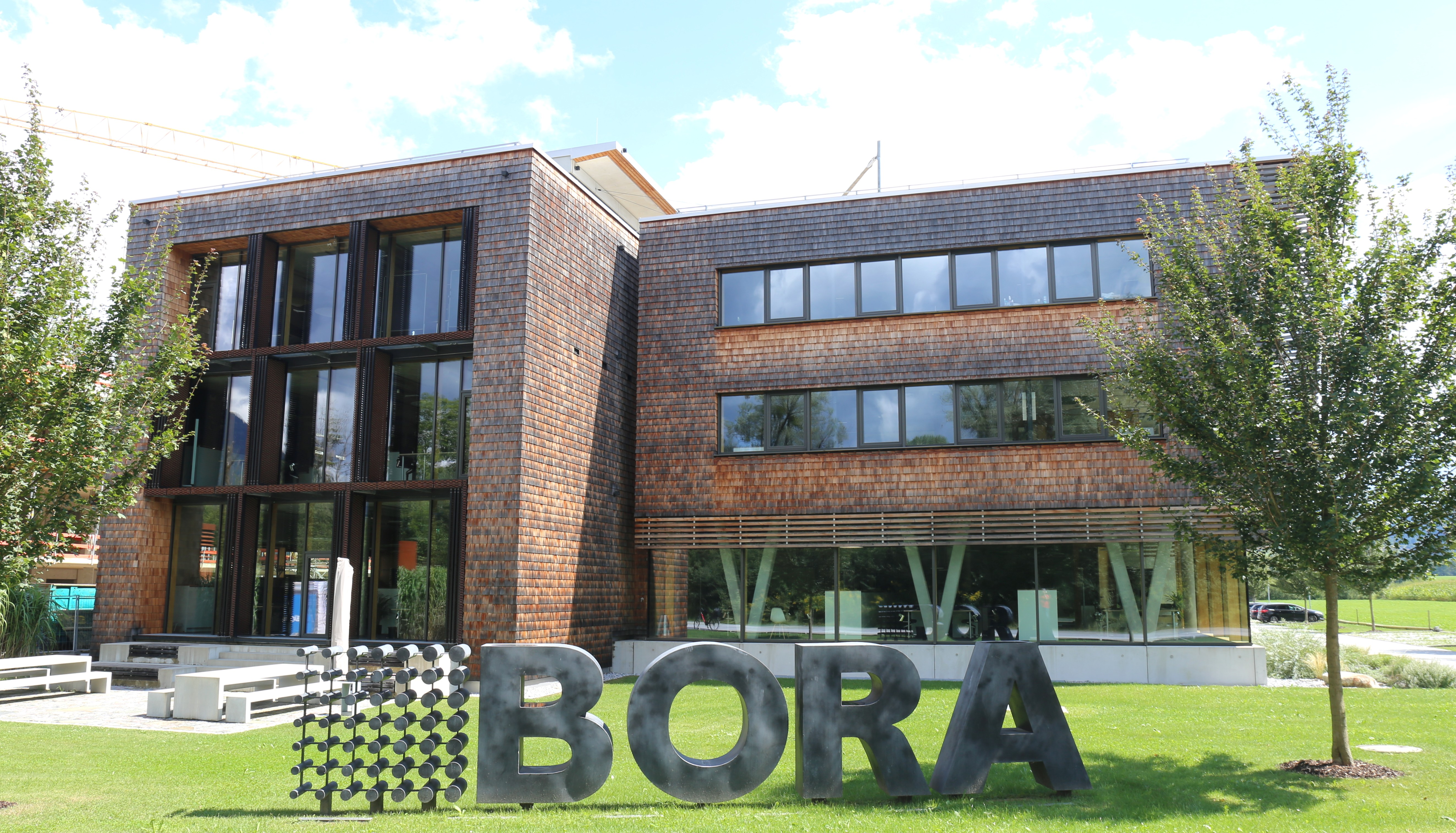
Office in Niederndorf, Austria

== History ==
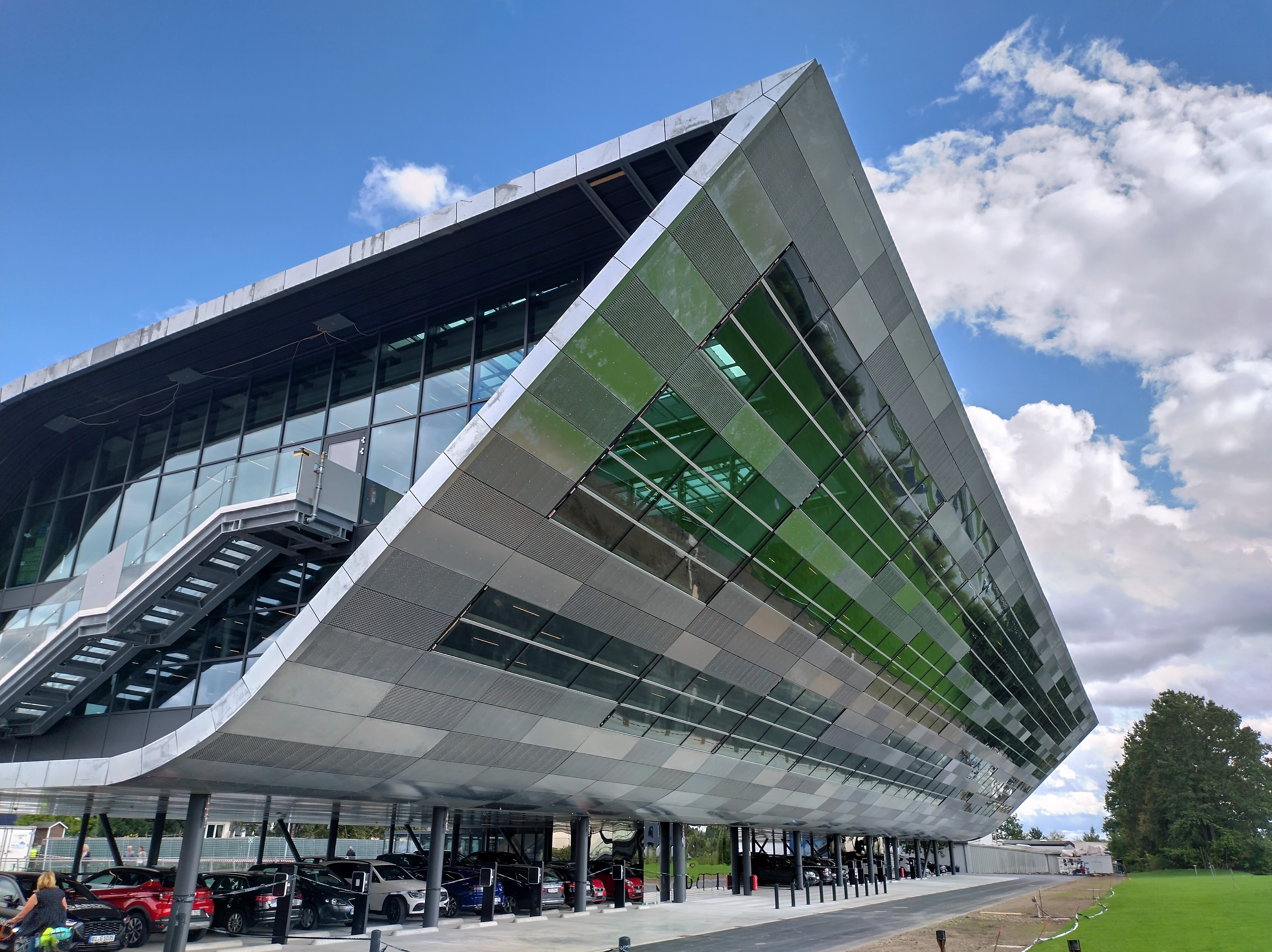
Bora flagship store in Herford, Germany

In 2005, Willi Bruckbauer developed a prototype for a cooktop extractor system which would draw steam produced by cooking downwards via an extractor embedded in the cooktop In 2006, the first patent application for the Bora Professional cooktop extractor system was submitted.

In 2007, Willi Bruckbauer founded the company Bora Lüftungstechnik GmbH. In 2008, Bora launched the first Bora Professional cooktop extractor system, along with a gas cooktop and a Tepan stainless steel grill. Development also began on induction and ceramic (Ceran) cooktops. At this stage, with just two employees, the company started exporting to the Benelux, Austria, and South Tyrol.

In the following years, air circulation and extraction systems were made available for private kitchens and the distribution network was expanded to 58 countries.

In September 2023, Bora Lüftungstechnik GmbH opened a flagship store in Herford, where its own products are presented, but where it also provides exhibition spaces for several kitchen furniture manufacturers. A restaurant can be found on the top floor. The building, which features unique architecture whose appearance from afar is that of a plane wing, is located by Bundesstrasse 239 at the exit leading onto Ahmser Strasse.

In 2025, the company plans to build a factory in Austria. Around 100 new jobs are expected to be created at the existing site.

== Products ==
The company predominantly manufactures cooktop extractor systems. The Bora cooktop extractor systems are integrated into the cooktop and use cross-flow fans to generate a downward airflow that relies on secondary flow patterns to efficiently extract steam. This product category accounts for the majority of its annual turnover.

Since 2021, Bora has also offered flex ovens, a combi appliance consisting of a steamer and baking oven. In September 2023, ready-to-install refrigeration and freezing systems were introduced, developed in collaboration with and manufactured by Liebherr.

== Awards ==
The company has received several awards, including a German Design Award, IF Design Awards and Red Dot Design Awards

In 2010, the company also received the German Founder’s Prize in the “Startup” category.In 2018, Bora won WirtschaftKurier’s Mittelpreis der Medien in the “Entrepreneurship” category for the Bora cooktop extractor system.

== Sponsoring ==
Since 2015, Bora has sponsored its own cycling team, which, together with Hansgrohe, has participated in international cycling races as the Bora – hansgrohe UCI WorldTeam since 2017. Among the team’s greatest successes is Peter Sagan’s victory in Paris–Roubaix in 2018 and Jai Hindley’s in the Giro d’Italia 2022.

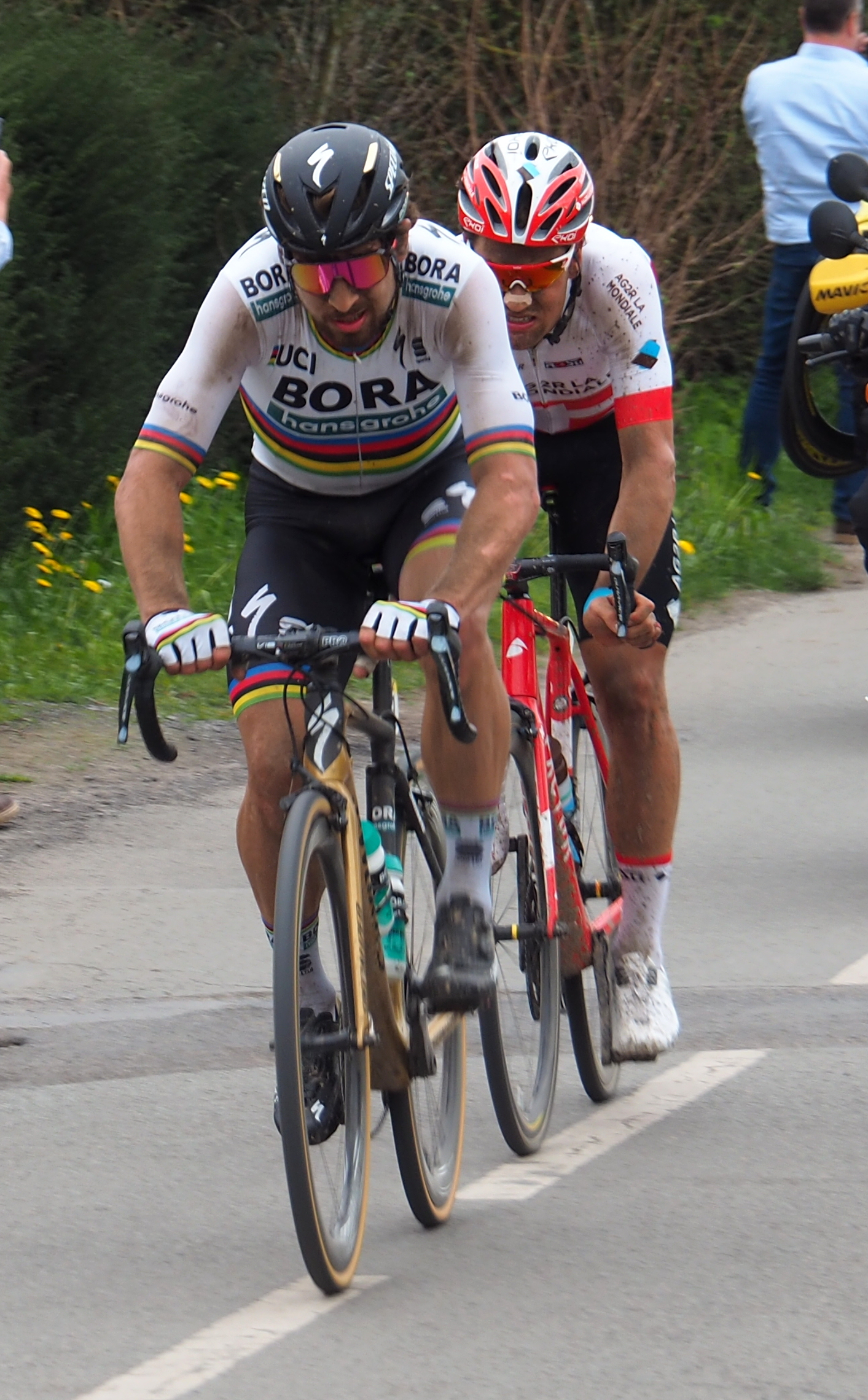
Sagan claimed his second monument at the 2018 Paris–Roubaix.

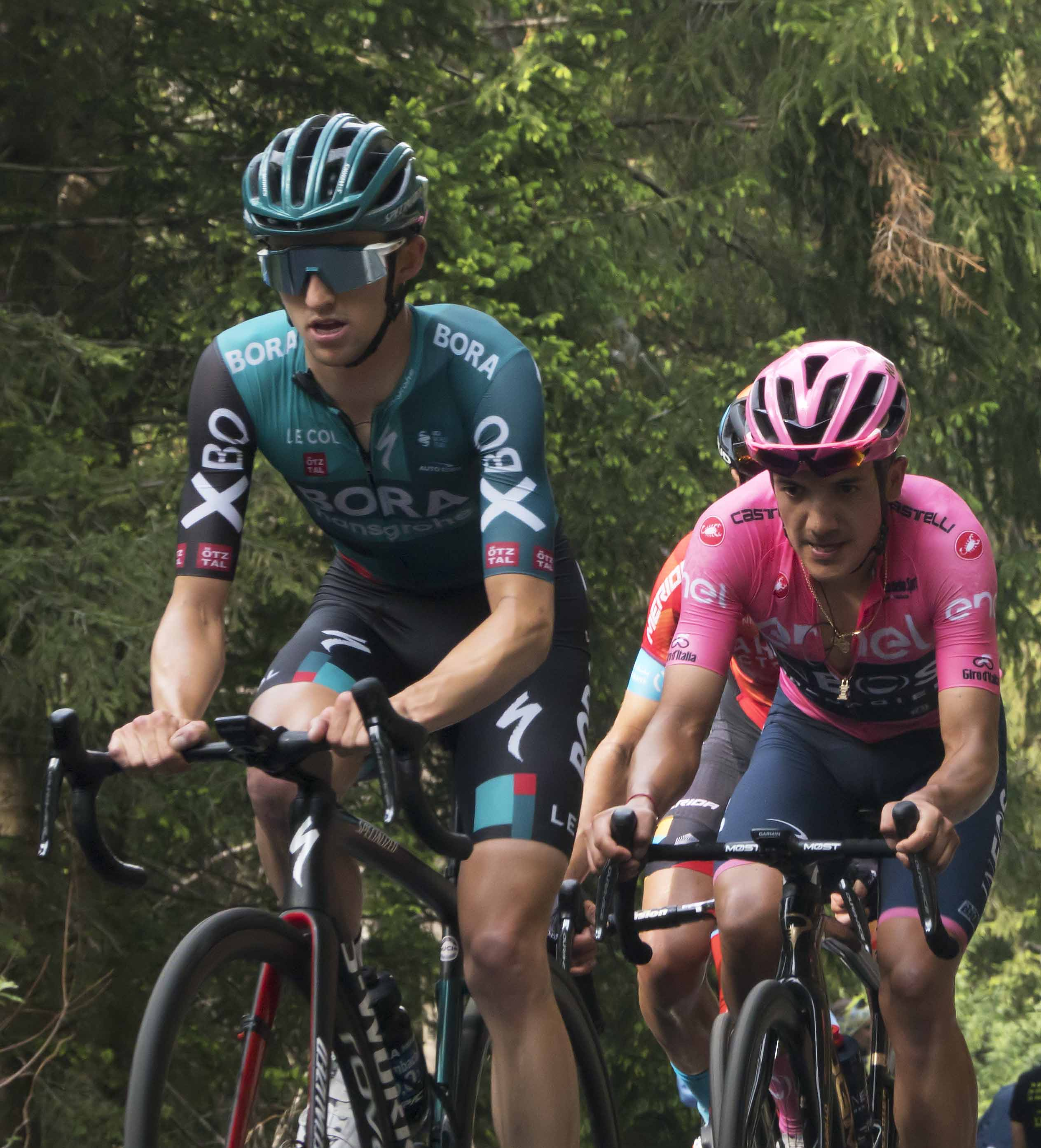
Hindley (left) at the 2022 Giro d'Italia
