= Bora Bora (disambiguation) =

Bora Bora is an island group in the Leeward Islands.

Bora Bora may also refer to:

== Places ==
- Bora Bora Island, an island in the Bora Bora group
- Bora Bora Airport, an airport on the island
- Bora-Bora (commune), an administrative subdivision of the Leeward Islands
- Kingdom of Bora Bora, a 19th-century independent state

== Arts and entertainment ==
- Bora Bora (1968 film), an Italian film
- Bora Bora (2011 film), a Danish film
- Bora Bora (album), by Os Paralamas do Sucesso, 1988
- "Bora Bora", a 1997 song by Da Hool
- "Bora Bora", a 2019 song by Lil Durk from Love Songs 4 the Streets 2
- Bora Bora, a novel by Alberto Vázquez-Figueroa

== See also ==
- "Bora! Bora! Bora!", a 2017 song by Scooter
- "Bora Bora Bora" (Orange Is the New Black), a 2013 television episode
