= Bora (district) =

District in Ethiopia

Bora is one of the Aanaas in the Oromia Regiona State of Ethiopia. It was part of the former Aanaa of Dugda Bora. Part of the East Shewa Zone it is located in the Great Rift Valley. The administrative center of Bora is Bote (Alem Tena).

== Demographics ==
The 2007 national census reported a total population for this woreda of 58,748, of whom 30,487 were men and 28,261 were women; 11,403 or 19.41% of its population were urban dwellers. The majority of the inhabitants said they practised Ethiopian Orthodox Christianity, with 86% of the population reporting they observed this belief, while 6.01% of the population practiced traditional beliefs, 4.47% of the population were Muslim, and 3.11% of the population were Protestant.
