= Raubling =

- Municipality
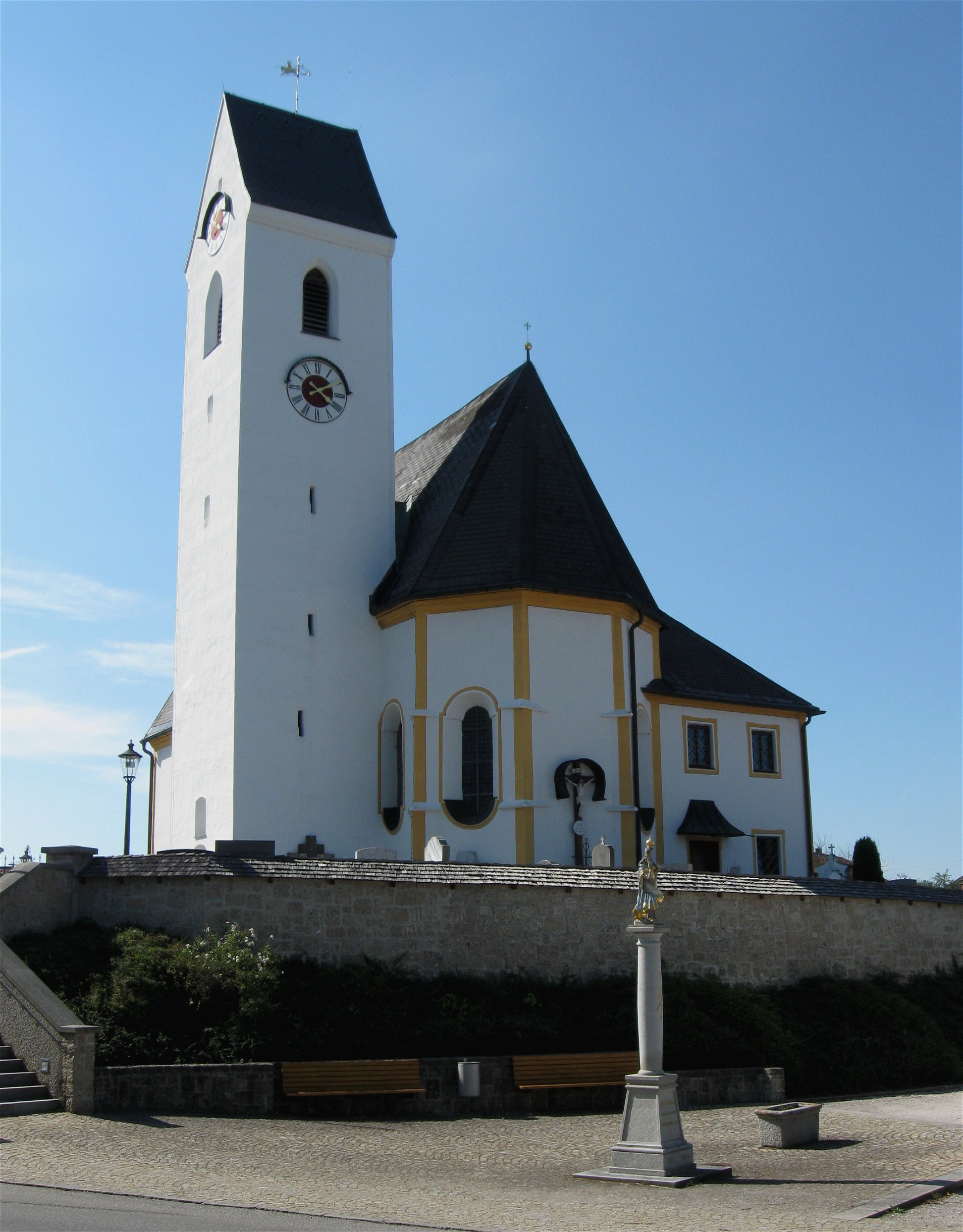
- Church of Saint George in Großholzhausen

- Coat of arms

- Location of Raubling within Rosenheim district
- Interactive map of Raubling
- Location within Germany Location within Bavaria
- Coordinates: 47°47′17″N 12°06′17″E
- Country: Germany
- State: Bavaria
- Admin. region: Oberbayern
- District: Rosenheim

Government
  - Mayor (2020–26): Olaf Kalsperger (CSU)

Area
  - Total: 44.27 km^{2} (17.09 sq mi)
- Elevation: 460 m (1,510 ft)

Population (2025-12-31)
  - Total: 10,862
  - Density: 245.4/km^{2} (635.5/sq mi)
- Time zone: UTC+01:00 (CET)
  - Summer (DST): UTC+02:00 (CEST)
- Postal codes: 83064
- Dialling codes: 08035
- Vehicle registration: RO
- Website: www.raubling.de

Raubling (German pronunciation: [ˈʁaʊblɪŋ]) is a municipality in the district of Rosenheim, Bavaria, Germany. It is situated on the western bank of the river Inn, 7 km south of Rosenheim.

== History ==
=== Name change ===
The municipality was officially renamed from Kirchdorf am Inn to Raubling on 26 June 1953.

=== Municipalization ===
As part of a regional reform performed in Bavaria, the municipality of Raubling absorbed Großholzhausen, Pfraundorf, and Reischenhart on 1 May 1978.
