= Sonalika Tractors =

Indian agricultural machinery manufacturer

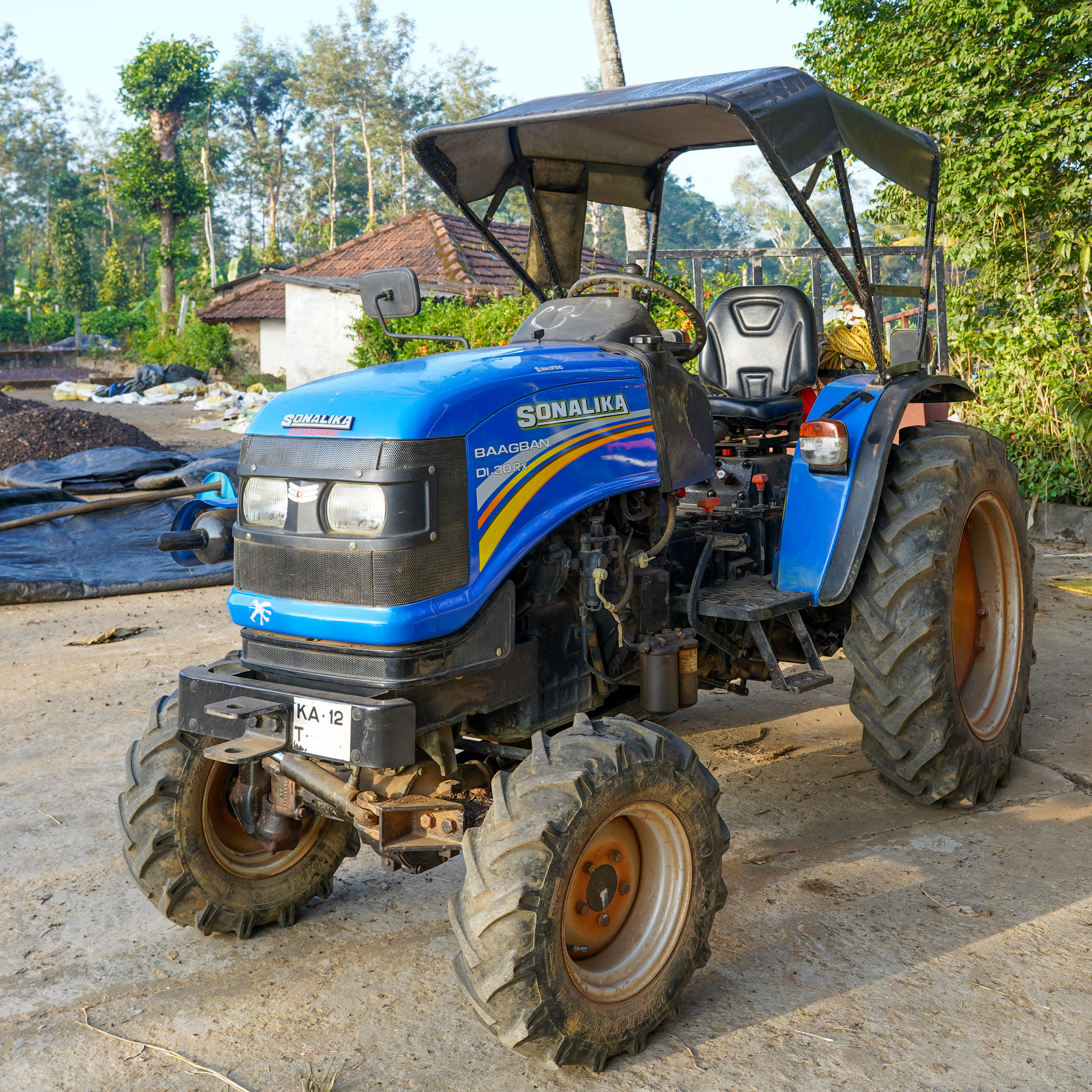
- Sonalika DI-30Rx tractor
- Type: Private
- Industry: Agricultural machinery
- Founded: 1995; 31 years ago
- Founder: Lachhman Das Mittal
- Headquarters: Hoshiarpur, Punjab, India
- Area served: Worldwide
- Key people: Amrit Sagar Mittal (VC); Deepak Mittal (MD)
- Products: Tractors
- Parent: Sonalika Group
- Website: sonalika.com

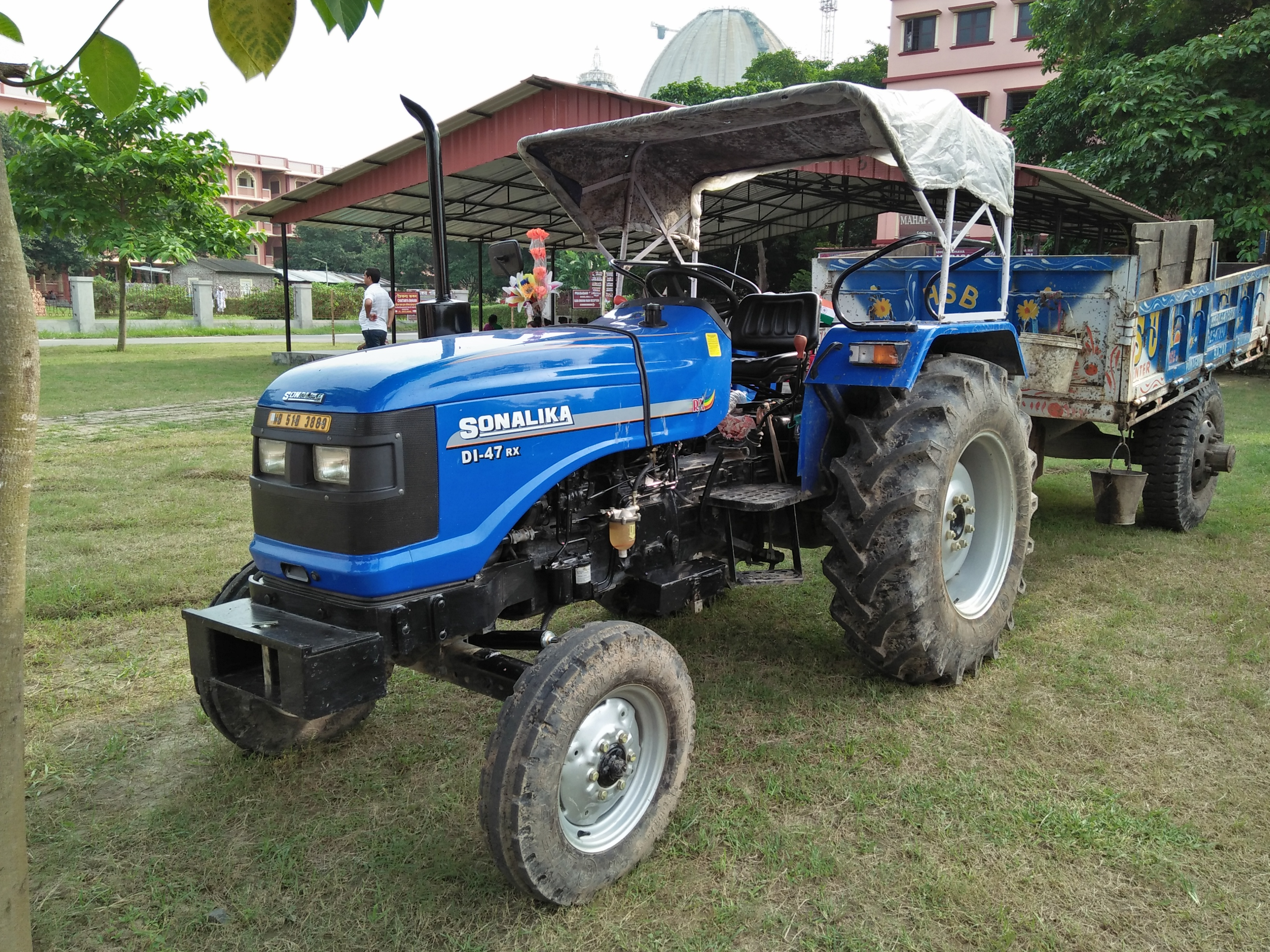
Sonalika DI-47 RX Tractor

Sonalika Tractors is an Indian agricultural machinery manufacturer. The company was founded in 1995 in Punjab, India. It is the 3rd largest manufacturer of tractors in India, with the capacity to produce 3,00,000 (0.3 million) tractors a year, as of June 2017. The company has become the No.1 company in exports from India selling 35,000 tractors in FY 2021–22 and is active in 150+ countries. It manufactures tractors ranging from 20 HP to 125 HP. The company is operated by International Tractors Limited, the flagship firm of Sonalika Group.

Sonalika Tractors holds about 11.7% market share of the Indian tractor industry. Sonalika Group owns a 70 per cent stake in the company while Japanese diesel engine manufacturer, Yanmar hold 30 per cent stake. It was selected for the 'Champions of Change' 2017 programme organised by Niti Aayog.

== History ==
The brand Sonalika Tractors is owned and operated by International Tractors Limited, which was incorporated in 1969. It was founded by Lachhman Das Mittal. It sold its first tractor in 1996. International Tractors Limited was incorporated on 17 October 1987 and began manufacturing tractors named as Sonalika designed by Central Mechanical Engineering Research Institute (CMERI).

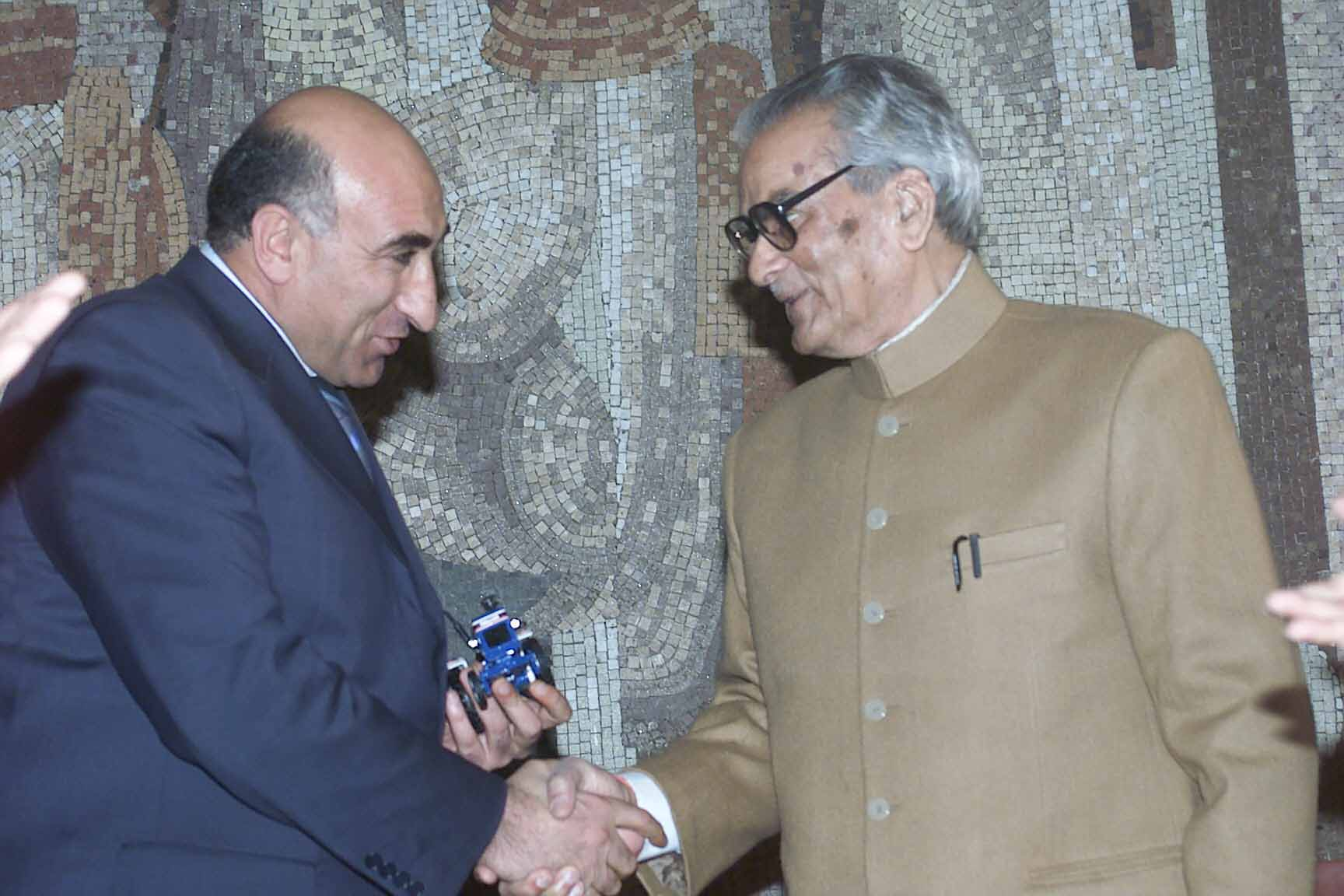
The Vice President of India, Bhairon Singh Shekhawat symbolically handing over Sonalika tractors gifted by India to Armenia at his meeting with the Armenian Minister of Agriculture, Davit Lokyan in Yerevan on October 7, 2005

In 2000, Renault Agriculture, a French tractor maker, acquired a 20% stake in the company for 80 million francs (equivalent to $11.4 million in 2000) and formed a Sonalika-Renault joint venture to market its tractors worldwide.

After tie-up with Renault Agriculture, the company started producing licensed Renault tractors under the Renault Sonalika International. However, the tractors are marketed under 'Solis' brand name while it is marketed under the 'Sonalika' brand name in India. In August 2005, Sonalika bought back its stake from Renault when Renault Agriculture was acquired by Germany's Claas Motors. In October 2005, Yanmar, a Japanese company, acquired a 12% stake in Sonalika Tractors.

In October 2012, the Blackstone Group bought a 12.5 per cent stake in the company for ₹520 crore. The investment from Blackstone made the company valued at ₹4,200 crore in 2012. The market share of Sonalika Tractors was also increased from 7.8 per cent (in 2011) to 9.9 per cent in 2013. The company launched a heavy range air-conditioned tractor series called Worldtrac 90 in June 2013. In December 2016, Yanmar bought 18 per cent stake in Sonalika for about ₹1,600 crore. Currently, it owns a 30 per cent stake in the company after Blackstone exit.

It formed a new joint venture with FAMAG in Algeria in October 2018.

== Plants ==
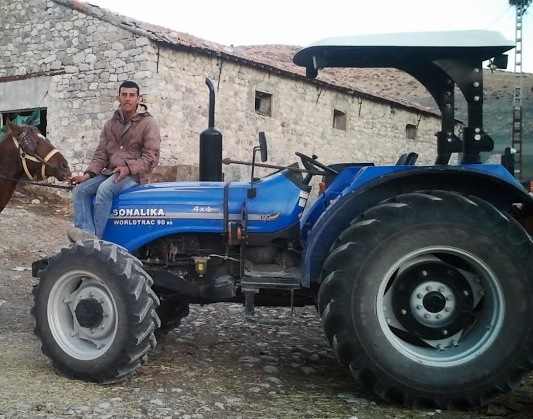
Sonalika Worldtrac 90

Sonalika has the world's largest tractor manufacturing facility, in Hoshiarpur, Punjab. It is spread across 85 acres of land and has all manufacturing facilities, from the engine to assembly. The plant has a production capacity of 3,00,000 tractors annually. In May 2017, the then Chief Minister of Punjab, Amarinder Singh, inaugurated the integrated tractor manufacturing unit of Sonalika.

The Hoshiarpur plant is also equipped with a robotic paint facility, which was introduced for the first time in the Indian tractor industry. Sonalika has assembly plants in Brazil, Iran, Argentina, Algeria and Cameroon.

== Products ==
- DI, RX Series
- WT Series
- GT Series
- Sikander Series
- Customized Series (Chhatrapati, Mahabali & Maharaja)
- MM Series
- Tiger Series
- Sikander DLX Series
- Solis brand of tractors

=== Former brands ===
- Apache Solis - joint venture in Argentina to manufacture tractors
- Landini Solis - tractors built by Sonalika and sold in other countries by Landini
- Montana Solis - built/assembled in Brazil
- Solis Brasil - built/assembled in Brazil

== Operations ==
It holds a 60% market share in Algeria, 22% in Nepal and 20% in Bangladesh. The company operates in over 150+ countries and is one of the top Indian tractor exporters.

== Awards and recognition ==
- In 2019, Sonalika Tractors won Best Tractor for Agriculture (Sonalika Worldtrac 600), Best Design Tractor Award (Sonalika's Solis 5015) at the Indian Tractor of the Year (ITOTY) Awards 2019.
- In 2018, it won the 11th Global Agriculture Leadership Award from the Indian Council of Food and Agriculture (ICFA) in the Industry Leadership category.
- It was selected for the Niti Aayog's 'Champions of Change' 2017 programme.
- Sonalika Tractors received the ET Iconic Brand of India by The Economic Times in 2017.
- Sonalika Tractors awarded The Best Quality Award by the Government of India in 2002–03.

== See also ==
- Sonalika Group
- Tractors in India
- List of tractor manufacturers
