= Ram Colony Camp =

- Town
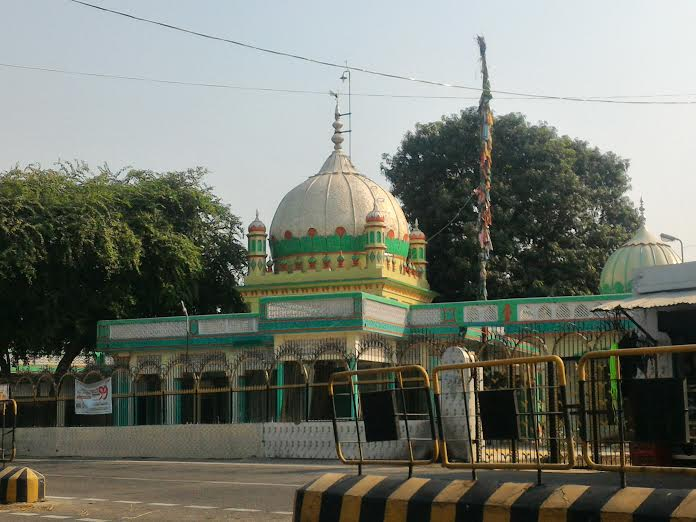

- Location in Punjab, India
- Coordinates: 31.5008769°N 75.946027°E
- Country: India
- State: Punjab
- District: Hoshiarpur

Languages
  - Official: Punjabi
- Time zone: UTC+5:30 (IST)
- PIN: 146001
- Telephone code: 01884
- Vehicle registration: PB 07

Ram Colony Camp is a suburb of Hoshiarpur city situated on Chandigarh-Hoshiarpur highway. It is 138 km from state capital Chandigarh. The location is famous for its Food Craft Institute It is located in lush green area, having fields and orchards of Oranges, continued to adjoining village Chauni Kalan.

== Background ==
During Partition of India, in 1947, The refugees from Pakistan were camped here and accommodated 1,000 displaced persons. Slowly, the area got developed as residence and famously called as Camp, among localities.

== How to Reach ==
=== Rail ===
The nearby railway station is Hoshiarpur Railway station in Manavta Nagar, where train are connected to/from National Capital, Delhi via Jalandhar.

=== Road ===
It is situated on Chandigarh-Hoshiarpur state highway 24 and is stoppage for Punjab Roadways and many private bus services. The Hoshiarpur bypass is next stop to this town.

=== Air ===
The nearest airports are Adampur Airport (19 km)Chandigarh International Airport (130 km), Sahnewal Airport, Ludhiana (79 km), Pathankot Airport (91 km), Gaggal Airport (101 km) and Sri Guru Ram Dass Jee International Airport (122 km)

== Facilities ==
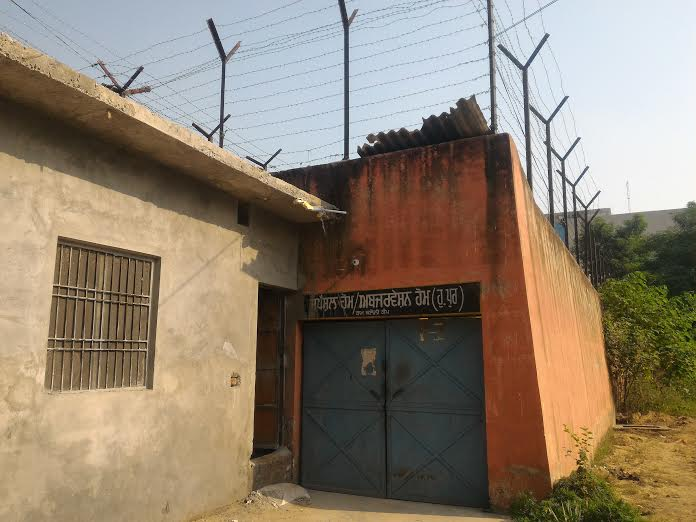
Juvenile Home, Ram Colony Camp, Hoshiarpur

- Bal Sudhar Ghar - Juvenile Reform Home

=== Banks ===
- Punjab National Bank
- Oriental Bank of Commerce

=== Healthcare ===
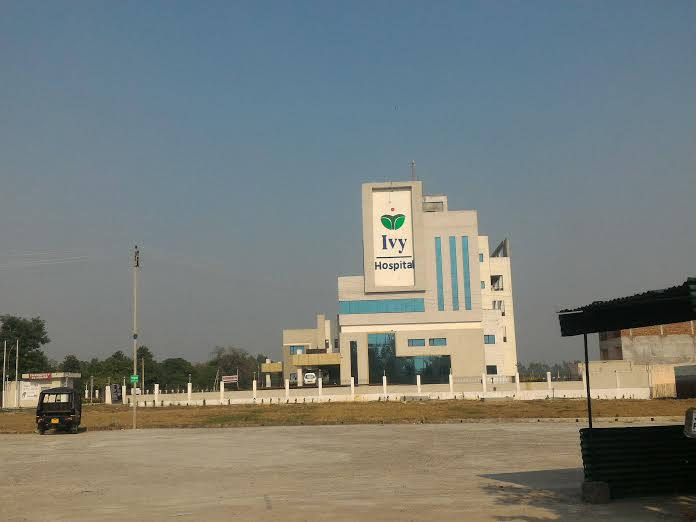
Ivy Hospital, Ram Colony Camp, Hoshiarpur

The camp have oldest hospital known as St. Joseph Hospital which was opened in 1973. It also homes to Ivy hospital, one of the largest healthcare providers in Punjab.

The camp also have Government Hospital and Old Age Home run by Punjab Government.

=== Education ===
- St. Joseph's Convent School
- Food Craft Institute

=== Religious ===
- Peer Shah-yu-Koof Mausoleum
- St. Joseph's Catholic Church
- Gurdwara Sahib

== Places of Interest around ==
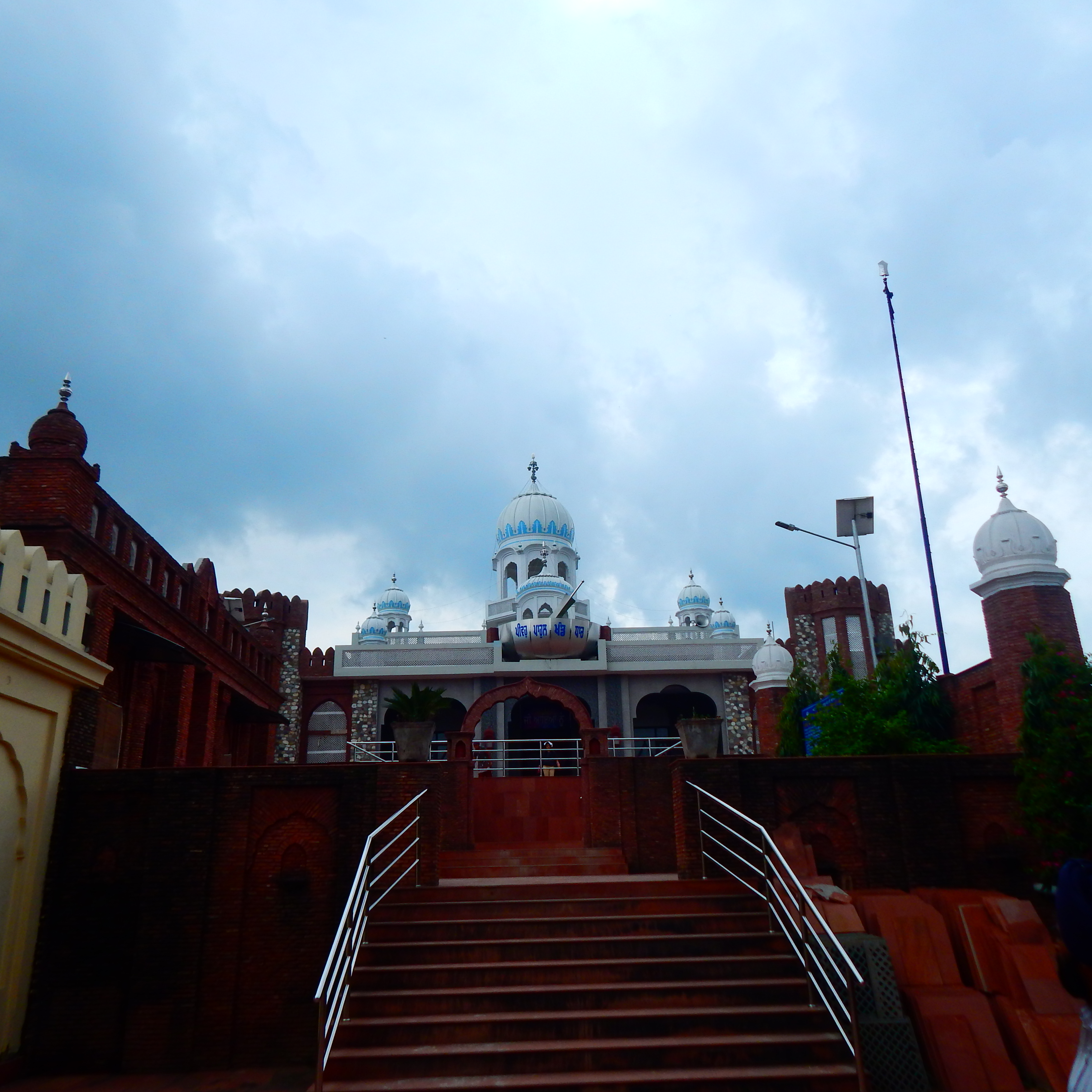
Gurdwara Mata Sundri

- Hoshiarpur City
- Gurdwara Mata Sundri, Bajwara - Birthplace of wife of Guru Gobind Singh. The village is situated on north and is 1 km from Ram Colony Camp.
- Gurdwara Harian Belan, Bajraur - Headquarter of Tarna Dal. The place is situated 6 km from Camp.
- Bajwara Fort
