= Bainchan =

Village in Punjab,India

Bainchan is a very small village in the Hoshiarpur District in the Indian state of Punjab.
