= Sajjana =

- Gram Panchayat: Sajjan
- Tehsil: Hoshiarpur
- District: Hoshiarpur
- State: Punjab
- Pincode: 146001
- Area: 124 hectares
- Population: 411

Sajjana (original name Sajjan) is a village in Hoshiarpur tehsil of Hoshiarpur district in Punjab, India.

== Location ==
It is situated 7 km away from district headquarters Hoshiarpur on the Hoshiarpur-Dasuya road also known as State highway 24. From the other side Sajjana connects to state highway 22 which links Hoshiarpur with Tanda.

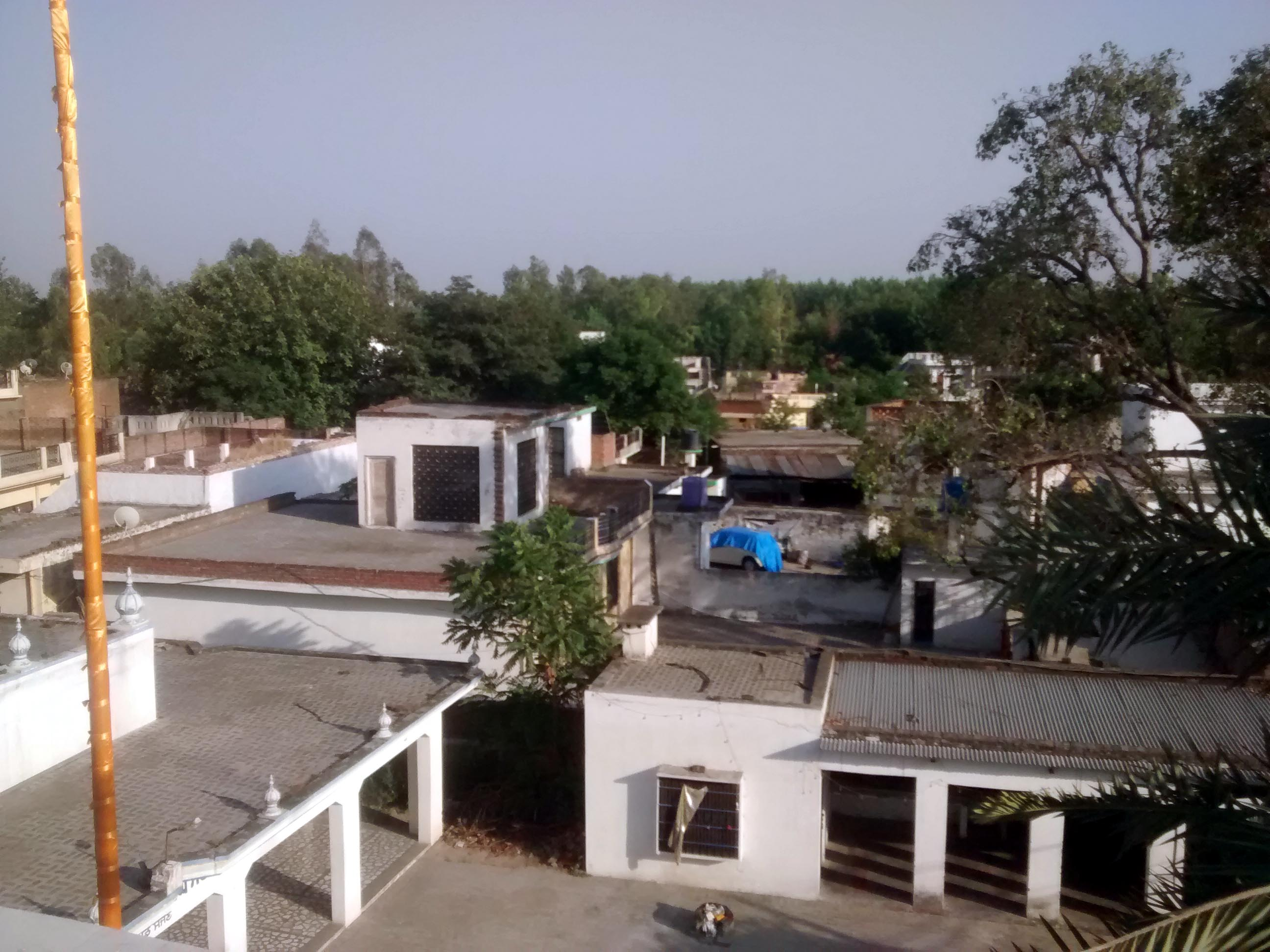
View of Village Sajjan towards South east from a House roof top

== Population and area ==
Sajjana has a total population of 411 people. There are about 86 houses in Sajjana. The total geographical area of the village is 124 hectares. The north-west and east part of Sajjana consist of farmland.

== Panchayat ==
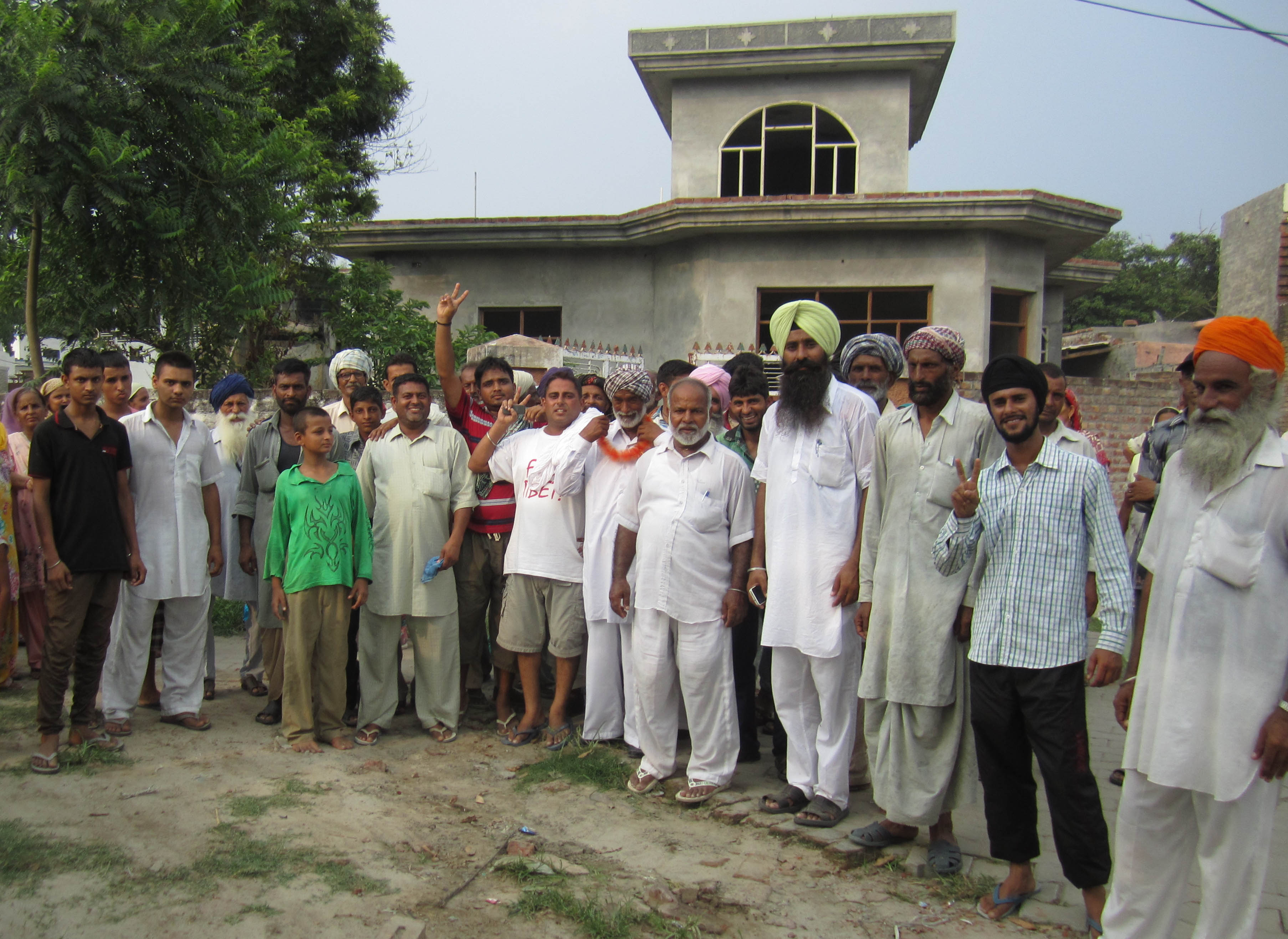
Election campaign in Sajjana

Sajjana village is itself a gram panchayat.
