= Budhiana =

- Census town
- Location in Punjab, India Budhiana (India)
- Coordinates: 31.3603663°N 75.6804746°E
- Country: India
- State: Punjab
- District: Jalandhar

Government
  - Type: Panchayat raj
  - Body: Gram panchayat
- Elevation: 240 m (790 ft)

Population (2011)
  - Total: 1,577
- Sex ratio 814/763 ♂/♀

Languages
  - Official: Punjabi
- Time zone: UTC+5:30 (IST)
- ISO 3166 code: IN-PB
- Website: jalandhar.nic.in

Budhiana is a census town in Jalandhar district of Punjab State, India. It is located 17 kilometres (11 mi) from Jalandhar, 20 kilometres (12 mi) from Phagwara, 34 kilometres (21 mi) from district headquarter Hoshiarpur and 145 kilometres (90 mi) from state capital Chandigarh. The village is administrated by a sarpanch who is an elected representative of village as per Panchayati raj (India).

== Transport ==
Bolina Doaba is the nearest railway station. Jalandhar city and Jalandhar Cantt, railway stations are the next nearest train stations. There is daily bus service from village to Jalandhar City and to the nearest bus connecting routes including Jandu Singha. The village is 79 kilometres (49 mi) away from domestic airport in Ludhiana and the nearest international airport is located in Chandigarh also Sri Guru Ram Dass Jee International Airport is the second nearest airport which is 103 kilometres (64 mi) away in Amritsar.

== See also ==
- List of villages in India
