= Usha Sangwan =

Indian businesswoman

Managing Director of Life Insurance Corporation of India

Personal details
- Born: 1958 (age 67–68) Punjab, India
- Parent: Lakshman Das Mittal (father)

Usha Sangwan is an Indian business executive and entrepreneur currently Managing Director at Life Insurance Corporation of India, India's biggest life insurance company. She is the first woman to reach this position in 2013. She has now been appointed as an Independent Director at LIC of India. Usha is the daughter of Lakshman Das Mittal, founder of Sonalika Group. She spent 37 years working at LIC between 1981 and 2018. She joined Tata Motors as an additional director and independent director in 2023.

== Profile ==
Sangwan has a Master's in Economics and Human Resources from Punjab University.

== Career ==
Earlier she has also handled LIC Housing Finance which is a subsidiary of LIC. She played an important role in turnaround of this company by raising $29.85 million through global depository receipts in 2004. She segregated marketing and underwriting divisions and introduced risk-based pricing. She is one of the directors of Axis Bank

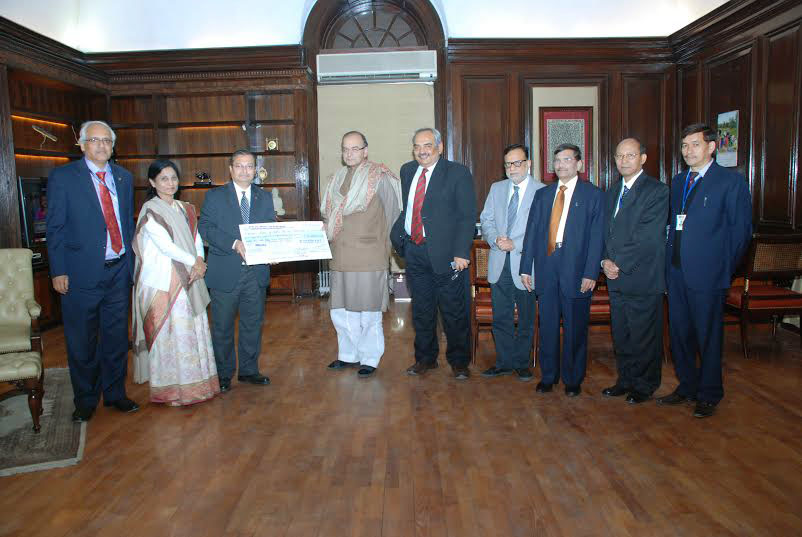
The Chairman, Life Insurance Corporation (LIC) of India, Shri S.K. Roy presenting the dividend cheque of Rs.1634, 89, 57, 602.00 to the Union Minister for Finance, Corporate Affairs and Information & Broadcasting, Shri Arun Jaitley, in New Delhi on December 15, 2014. The Finance Secretary, Shri Rajiv Mehrishi, the Secretary, Department of Financial Services, Ministry of Finance, Dr. Hasmukh Adhia and Shri Manak, Shri V.K. Sharma, Ms. Usha Sangwan, all Managing Directors, LIC are also seen.
