= Bajwara Fort =

Fort in Bajwara, India

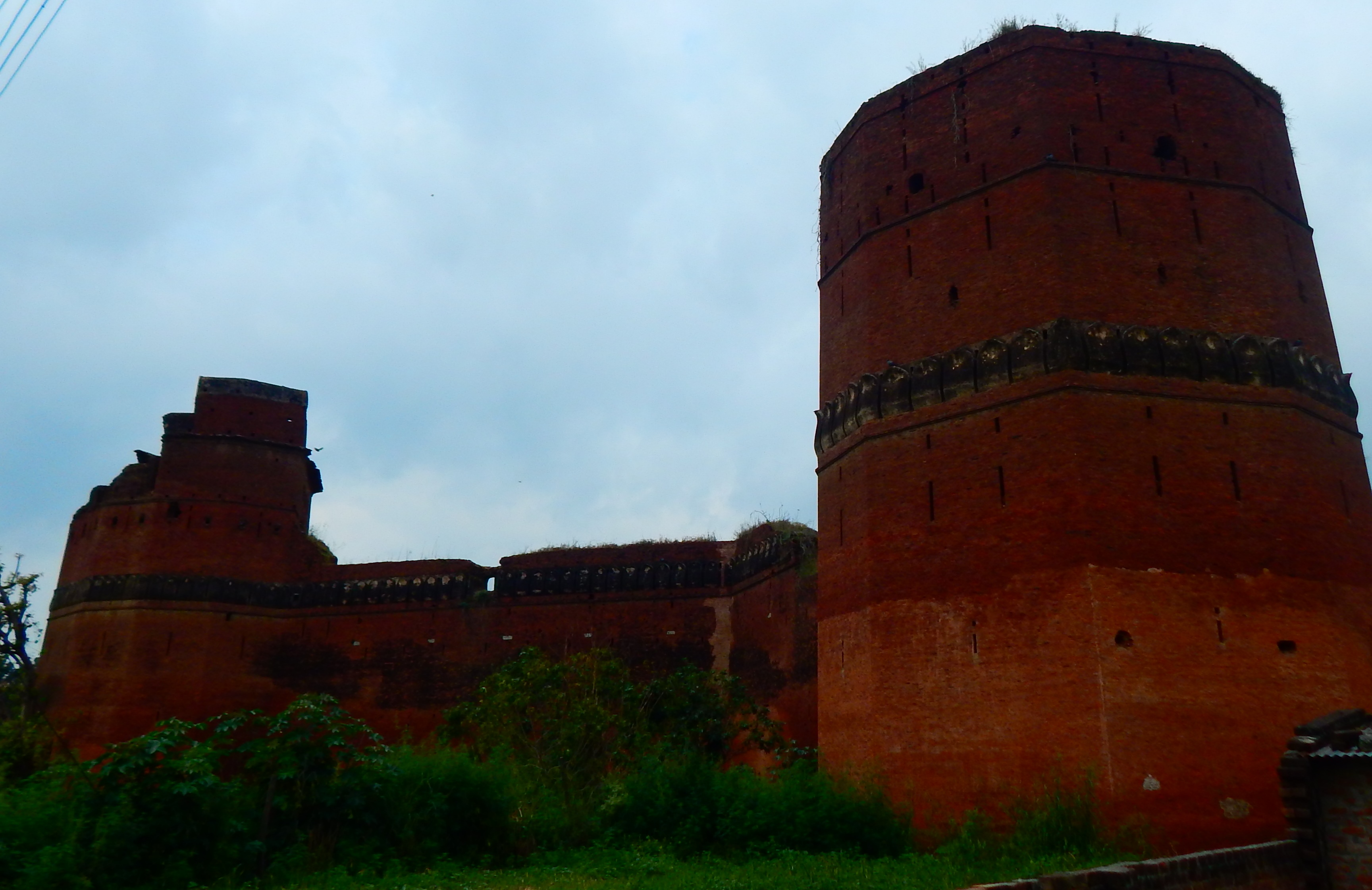
Photograph of Bajwara Fort in Hoshiarpur, by Karant Singh, 4 April 2015

Bajwara Fort, also known as Qila Bajwara or Kila Bajwara, is a qila fortress located in Bajwara, Hoshiarpur, Punjab, India that is spread over six to seven acres. The fortress' origin is unknown and it fell into the hands of various rulers. The fortress is endangered due to lack of maintenance and is at risk of total collapse.

== History ==
The early history of the fort is unknown, including its constructor, however various theories are that it was constructed by Sher Shah Suri or Afghans from Ghazni. The fortress may have been constructed by Pashtun settlers hailing from the Suleiman mountains in the late 15th century. According to the Hoshiarpur District Gazatteer, the settlement of Bajwara was founded by three immigrants from Ghazni. The name of the fort is believed to derive from Baiju Bawra (also spelt as 'Baju Baora'), one of the three immigrants, who was a celebrated dhrupad performer. In mid-1419, there was a rebellion in Bajwara that the Afghan official Malik Sultan Shah Lodi, who had served under Sultan Khizr Khan, quelled. There was a 1432 battle between Jasrat and Allahdad Kaka of the Delhi Sultanate. In the Ain-i-Akbari, the fort is referenced as one of the thirty-six mahals of the area. Maharaja Ranjit Singh of the Sikh Empire captured the fortress in 1825. The British used the fort to imprison mutineers during the 1857 rebellion. It was later dismantled as a prison and left ot the elements.

== Architecture ==
The fortress features Mughal designs and Islamic-local stylistic fusion in-regards to its architecture. The fort consists of two multi-tiered bastions that have towering arched portals, with this all being connected by strong walls.

== Status ==
Much of the fortress has collapsed due to neglect and lack of maintenance, with peepal causing damage to it. The roofs of the fort have collapsed. A visit by INTACH's Balwinder Singh and Harjit Singh in 2025 found only one wall still standing. No conservation work has ever been done on the fortress and it is threatened by apathy and urban-sprawl. It was proposed that a boundary wall be put-up and the site turned into a heritage-park to preserve it.

== Gallery ==
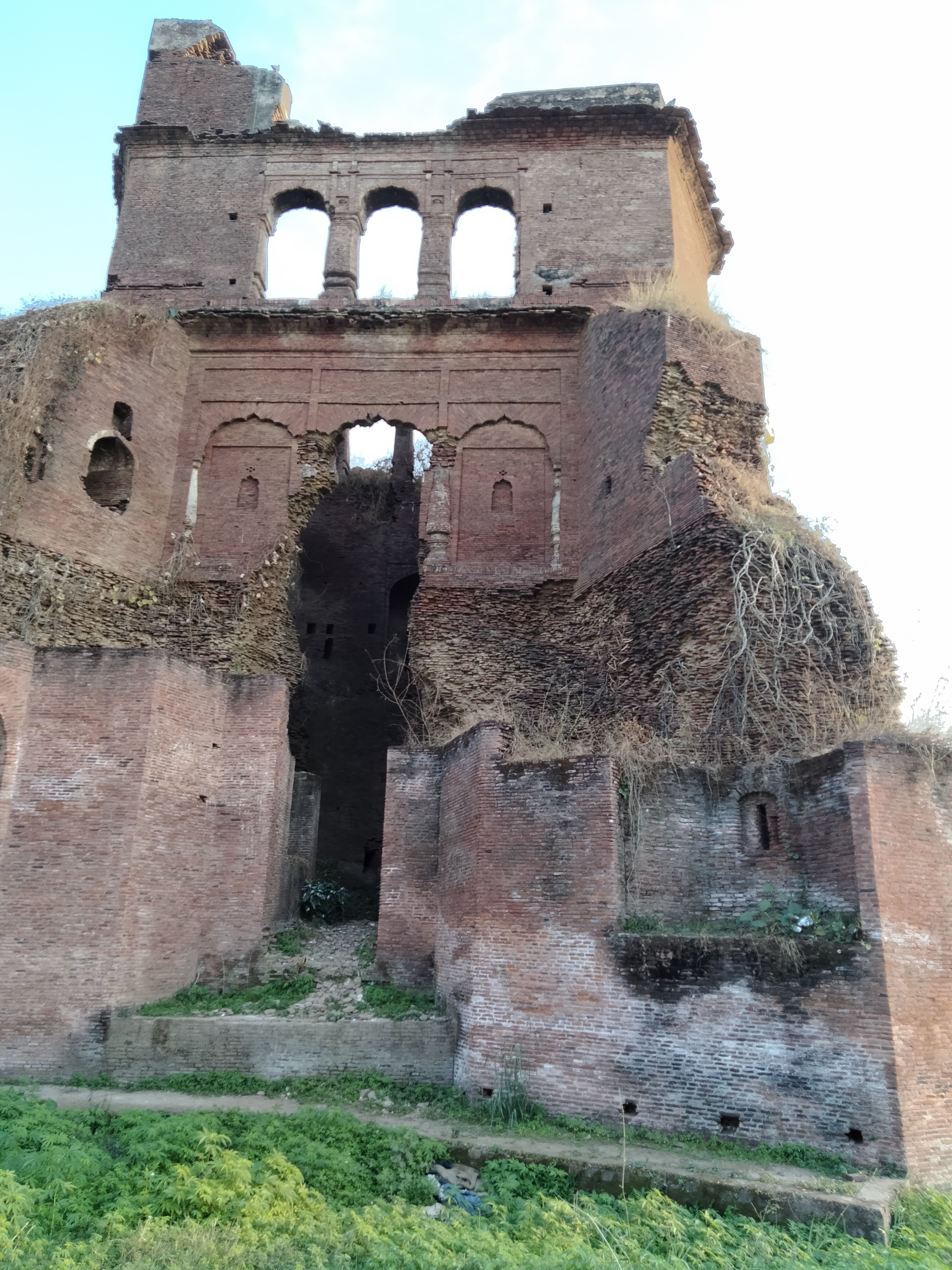

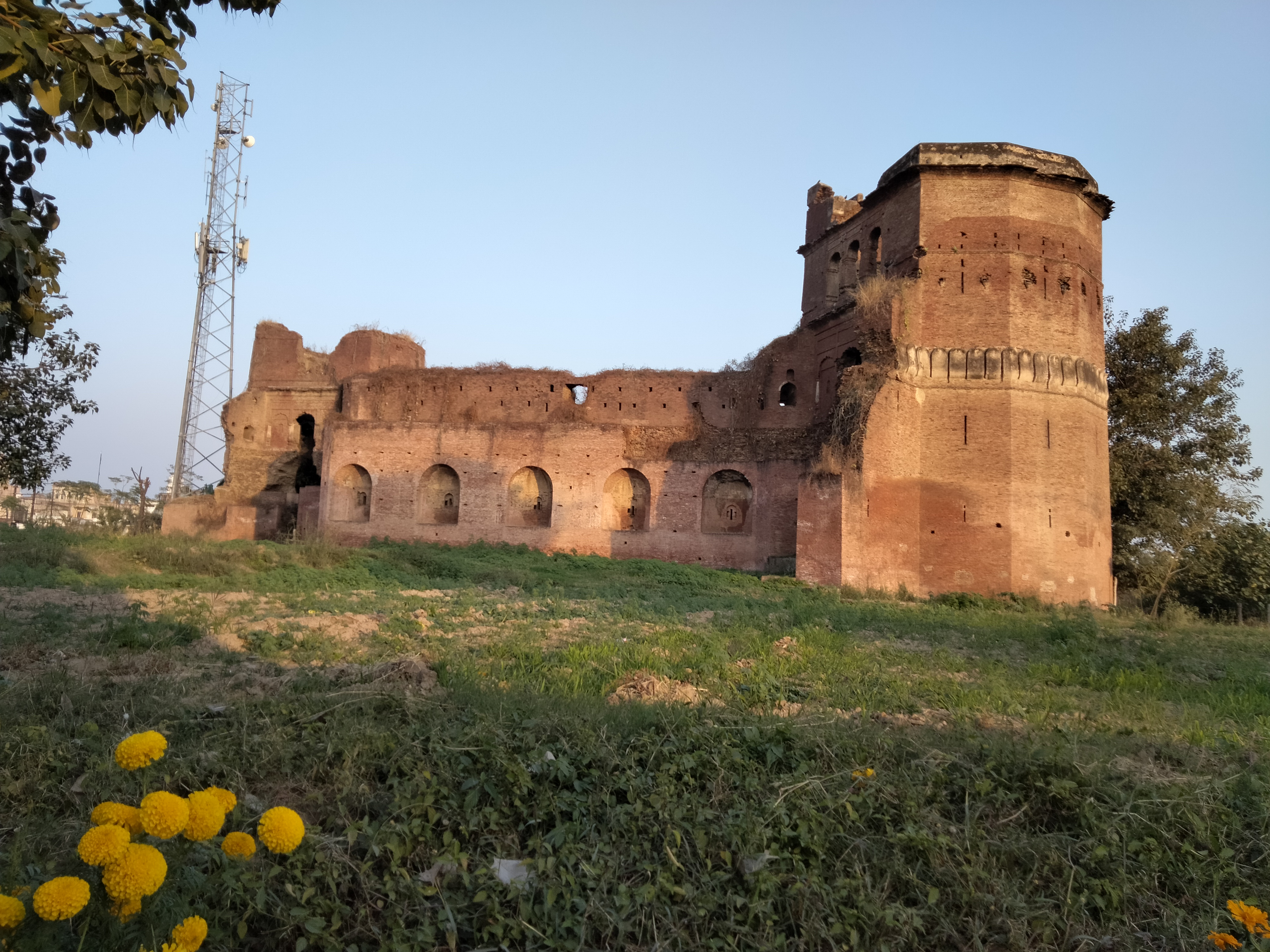

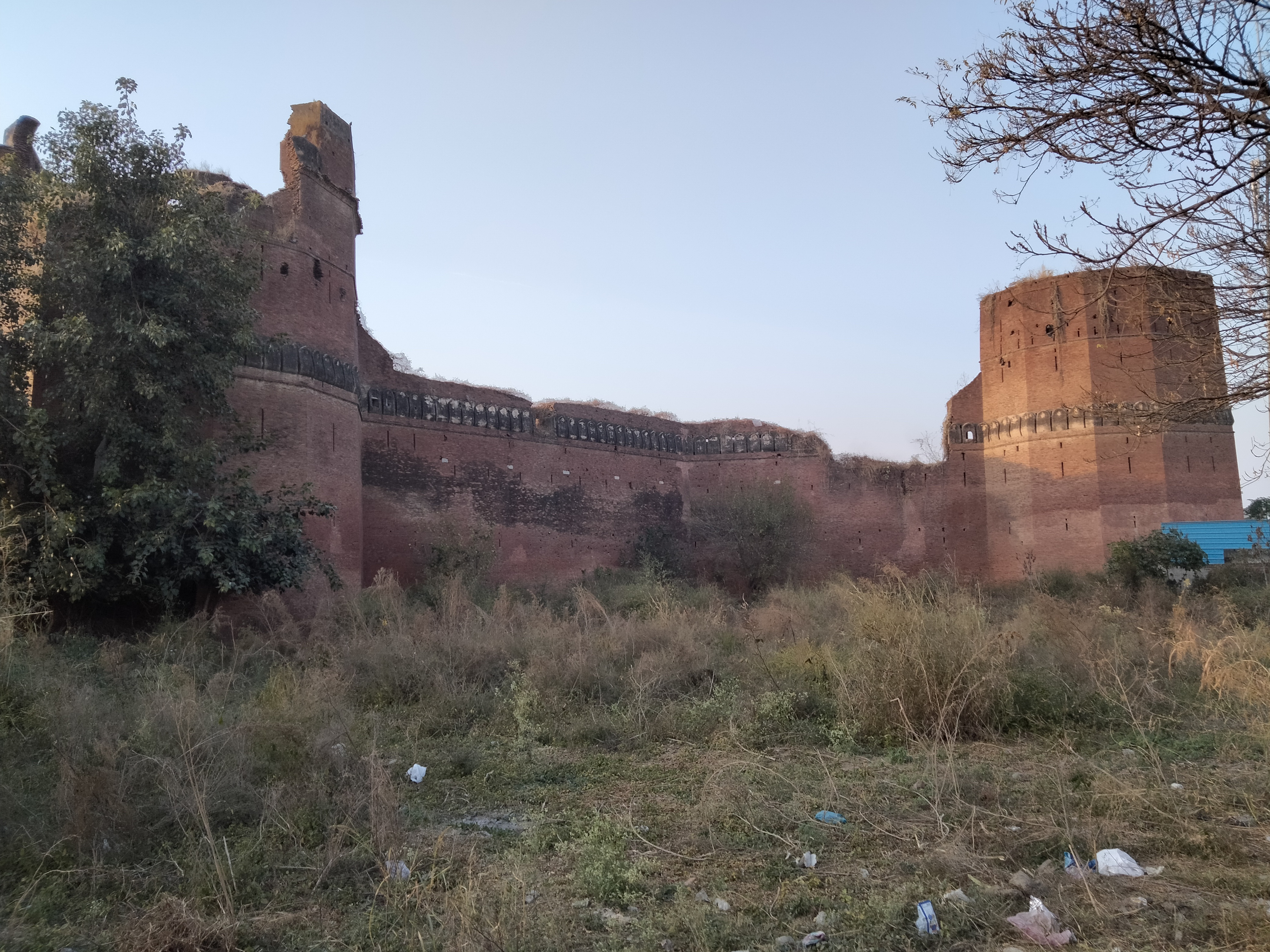
