= Boothgarh =

- Village
- Location in Punjab, India Boothgarh (India)
- Coordinates: 31.475216°N 75.944665°E
- Country: India
- State: Punjab
- District: Hoshiarpur

Languages
  - Official: Punjabi, Hindi
- Time zone: UTC+5:30 (IST)
- PIN: 141401
- Telephone code: 01628
- Vehicle registration: PB 26

Boothgarh is a medium-size village located in Khanna Tehsil of Ludhiana district in Punjab, India with a total of 254 families residing. The Boothgarh village has a population of 1190 of which 616 are males while 574 are females as per Population Census 2011.

In Boothgarh village population of children with age 0-6 is 120 which makes up 10.08% of the total population of the village. Average Sex Ratio of Boothgarh village is 932 which is higher than Punjab state average of 895. Child Sex Ratio for the Boothgarh as per census is 818, lower than Punjab average of 846.

Boothgarh village has a higher literacy rate compared to Punjab. In 2011, literacy rate of Boothgarh village was 80.19% compared to 75.84% of Punjab. In Boothgarh Male literacy stands at 86.73% while the female literacy rate was 73.27%.

As per constitution of India and Panchyati Raaj Act, Boothgarh village is administrated by Sarpanch (Head of Village) who is elected representative of the village. There is also a primary school in this village.
