= Kukanet, District Hoshiarpur, Punjab =

Village in Punjab, India

Coordinates: 31°46′N 75°55′E

Kukanet is a village in Bhunga Block of District Hoshiarpur in Punjab. It is situated in the low hills of Shivalik ranges which extends across the whole of northern India. The district headquarter Hoshiarpur is about 40 km away from Kukanet. It is approximately 175 km from Chandigarh. Kukanet is located at the border of Punjab and Himachal Pradesh. The closest town of Himachal Pradesh under District Una is Daulatpur to Kukanet. Nearby villages include Dholbaha (13 km), Baroom(shares the boundary), Bahera(7 km). Although the nearest post office is in Dholbaha, but Kukanet has a branch post office as well. Kukanet's pincode is 144206.

== Occupation ==
The main occupation of people is agriculture, particularly forestry. A percentage of the youth in Kukanet have also joined the armed forces. Colonel Teja Singh from Kukanet got Vir Chakra for displaying courage and leadership when his battalion was running short of ammunition and water. Not only did he manage to contact his battalion headquarters but also was able to withdraw his men safely amidst heavy shelling by the Pakistani army in the 1965 battle.

== Education ==
Kukanet has a Punjab government secondary school. It has been running since the mid-1930s. Initially it was just a primary school and was consequently made into a middle school in 1968. Finally it was made into a secondary school in 1993. The school caters to about 120 children each year from the village itself. The nearest graduate colleges are located in Haryana town (25 km from Kukanet) and Hoshiarpur City (40 km from Kukanet).

== Health services ==
The nearest primary health center is located in village Dholbaha. The nearest full-fledged government hospital enabled with emergency services is located in Haryana town (approximately 25 km from Kukanet).

== Travel ==
There are no buses to commuting between Kukanet and Haryana (town) every day. No active bus service nowadays.

== Nearest banks ==
The nearest bank is Punjab Agriculture Central Cooperative Bank and the Oriental Bank of Commerce located in Dholbaha. Also, there is a Punjab National Bank located in Janauri.

== Tourism ==
Local points of interest include the Dholbaha Dam, and the archaeological museum located in Dholbaha. Dholbaha was once a center of cultural and religious activity and served as a hub of a trade route. It had been a place of habitation from very early times; the archaeological discoveries have related it's antiquities to the Pleistocene period. Fossils and stone tools found in the valley indicate the appearance of early man, in the region. Most of the artifacts were imperishable - such as chopping tools and hand axes. Due to availability of resources, various civilizations flourished in Dholbaha region. The presence of fossils and sandstone sculptures of medieval period underlines the importance of Dholbaha and suggests that Dholbaha valley was occupied by the affluent iconolatry at various images. Most of the antiquities have been shifted to Vishvesvaranand Vishva Bandhu Institute of Sanskrit and Indological Studies, Sadhu Ashram, 4 km south east of city Hoshiarpur. VVIS&IS, Sadhu Ashram is a part Sanskrit department of Panjab University, Chandigarh.

Land in Kukanet is a private property of villagers, many commuters are sabotaging the state of harmony and creating havoc by brandishing swords and pistols.
