= Varinder Singh Bajwa =

Indian politician (1943/1944–2026)

Member of Parliament, Rajya Sabha
- In office 10 April 2004 - 9 April 2010
- Constituency: Punjab

Personal details
- Born: 15 February 1945 Layallpur (now in Pakistan)
- Died: 12 September 2026 (aged 81)
- Party: Shiromani Akali Dal; Indian National Congress
- Spouse: Jagjit Kaur (m. 1970)

Varinder Singh Bajwa (15 February 1945 – 12 September 2026) was an Indian politician who was the Senior Vice-President of Shiromani Akali Dal party and a Member of the Parliament of India, representing Punjab in the Rajya Sabha, the upper house of the Indian Parliament.

== Career ==
Varinder Singh Bajwa began his political career with the Shiromani Akali Dal in 1980. He served as the youth Akali leader in the 1980s and was elected as president of Hoshiarpur in 1995. He was elected to serve, Rajya Sabha, in 2004 from Punjab until 2010. He quit Akali Dal and eventually served a brief stint in Congress in 2017, until he eventually reconciled with the Akali Dal before 2022 Punjab Assembly elections and was a senior member ever since then. Varinder Singh Bajwa's wife Jagjeet Kaur is a retired lecturer of English Literature from Government College Hoshiarpur. Bajwa has three daughters residing in London, the United States and India. He was recently the senior vice president of the SAD.

== Personal life and death ==
Bajwa died on 11 September 2026, at the age of 82.

== Sources ==
- Profile on Rajya Sabha website
