= Bajwara =

Coordinates: 31°30′54″N 75°56′58″E

Bajwara is an old historic town situated in Hoshiarpur District. It is birthplace of Mata Sundri, first wife of Guru Gobind Singh. This is also the birthplace of Sher Shah Suri, Todar Mal from the Jerath family, and Mahatama Hansraj.

== History ==
Bajwara had been founded by three immigrants from Ghazni, one of whom was a singer named Baju Baora, whose name would be given to the settlement. It was site of a battle between Raja Jasrat and Allahdad Kaka, governor of Lahore of Delhi Sultanate in 1432, who was defeated and forced to flee. As per an account found in the Hoshiarpur District Gazatteer, the area of Bajwara was historically larger than its present-day size, consisting of eighteen miles in circumference, however its size was reduced by Todar Mal, an official of Akbar's court. The reason for reducing its size was a punishment, as Todar Mal did not feel he was extended a warm welcome by the residents when he was travelling through the locality en-route to the Kangra Fort.

This place got redeveloped till the 18th century before it came into the initiation of Jat Sikh ruler Maharaja Ranjit Singh who trivially commissioned the founding stone of Bajwara fort. Bajwara was a popular trading centre between Bukhra and Delhi. Bajwara consisted of 22 Bassi villages.

== Gallery ==
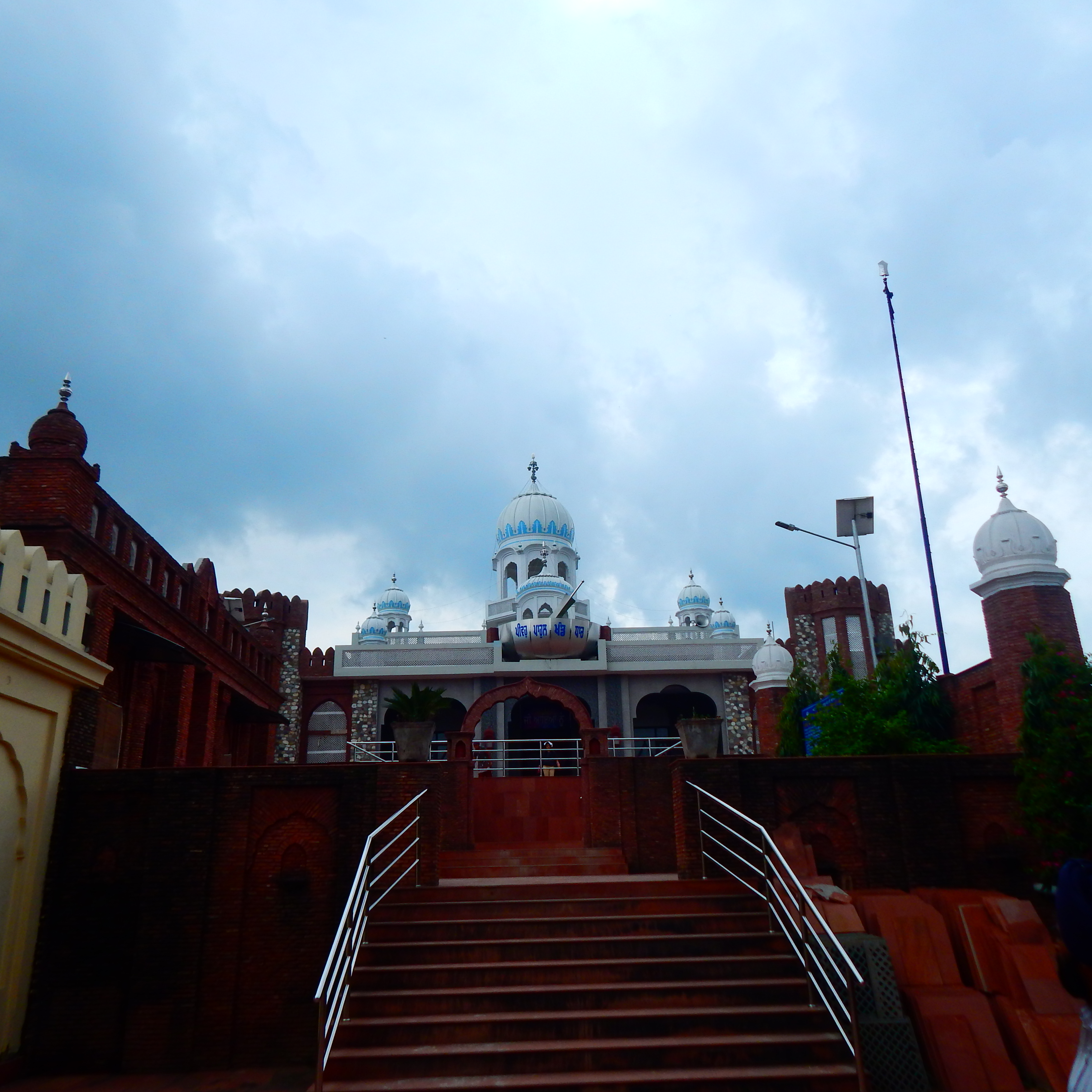
Birth and marriage place of Mata Sundri

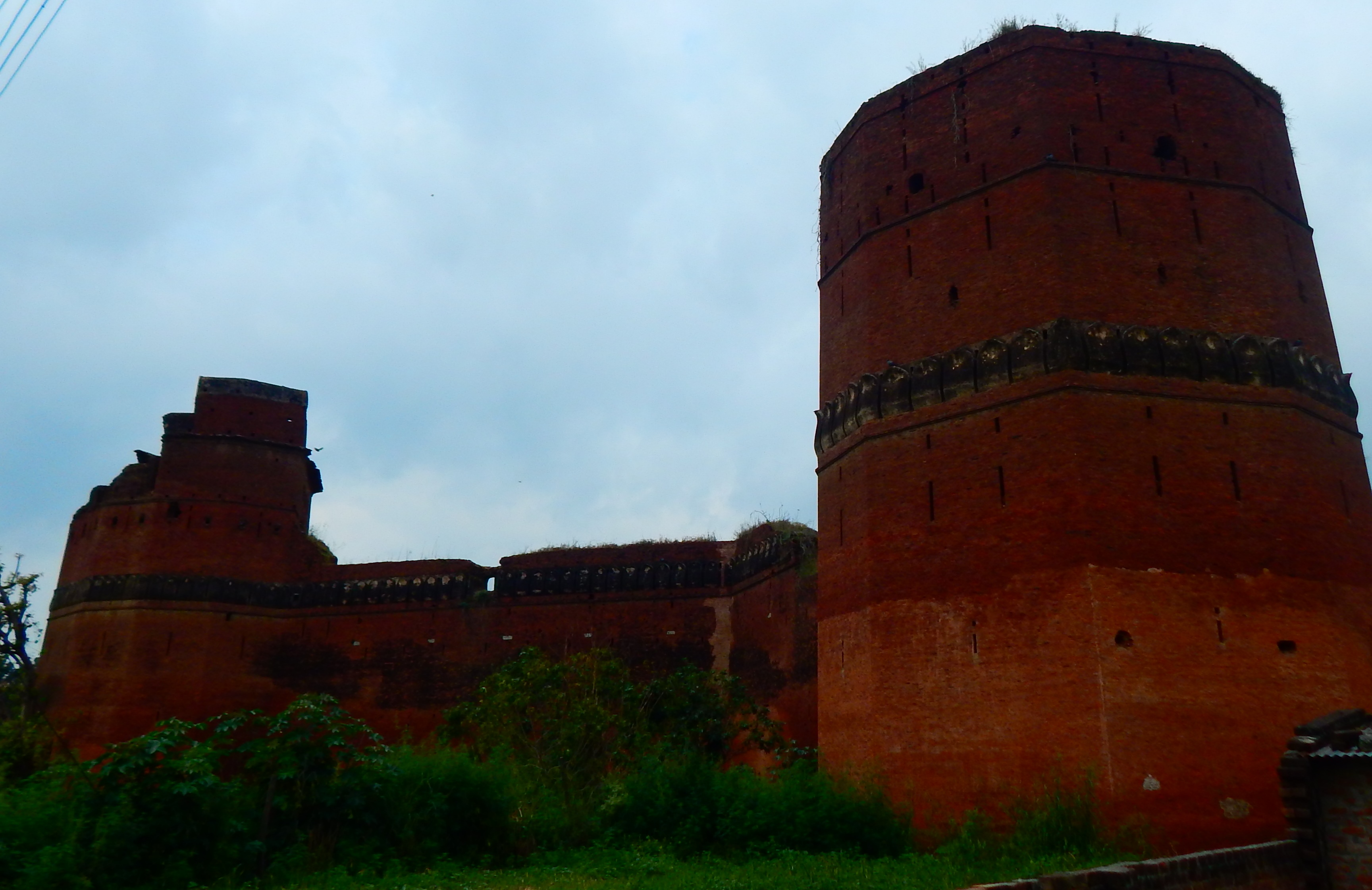
Bajwara Fort, Hoshiarpur
