= Karam Singh Raju =

Indian Civil Servant

Karam Singh Raju was an Indian bureaucrat and author who joined the Punjab State Civil Service just after the Independence of India. He was one of the very few first dalits who joined this prestigious service.

== Early life ==
He was born in Hoshiarpur in Ravidasia Sikh family and his father, Duni Chand, used to work as a leather worker.

== Professional and personal life ==
Raju retired from the Indian Administrative Service in the year 1986. At the time of retirement, he was Principal Secretary and, before that, he served as Deputy Commissioner for many districts of Punjab.

Raju was a staunch follower of Guru Ravidass and Sikhism, and he penned several books.

== Publications ==
During his lifetime Raju wrote several books and few of them are as the follows-

- Ethical Perceptions of World Religions published by Guru Nanak Dev University, Amritsar
- Guru Gobind Singh-Prophet of Peace
- Guru Ravidass Life and Philosophy published by Ratna Memorial Trust
- Untouchability Attire

== See also ==
- Indian Administrative Service
