= Sonalika Group =

Indian tractor manufacturer

- Industry: Automobile
- Founded: 1969
- Founder: Lakshman Das Mittal
- Headquarters: Hoshiarpur, Punjab, India
- Area served: Worldwide
- Number of employees: 5,000
- Website: sonalika.com

The Sonalika Group is an Indian multinational company headquartered in Hoshiarpur, Punjab, and is active mainly in the automobile sector. It is best known for Sonalika Tractors. The Sonalika Group is headed by Lakshman Das Mittal.

== Operations ==
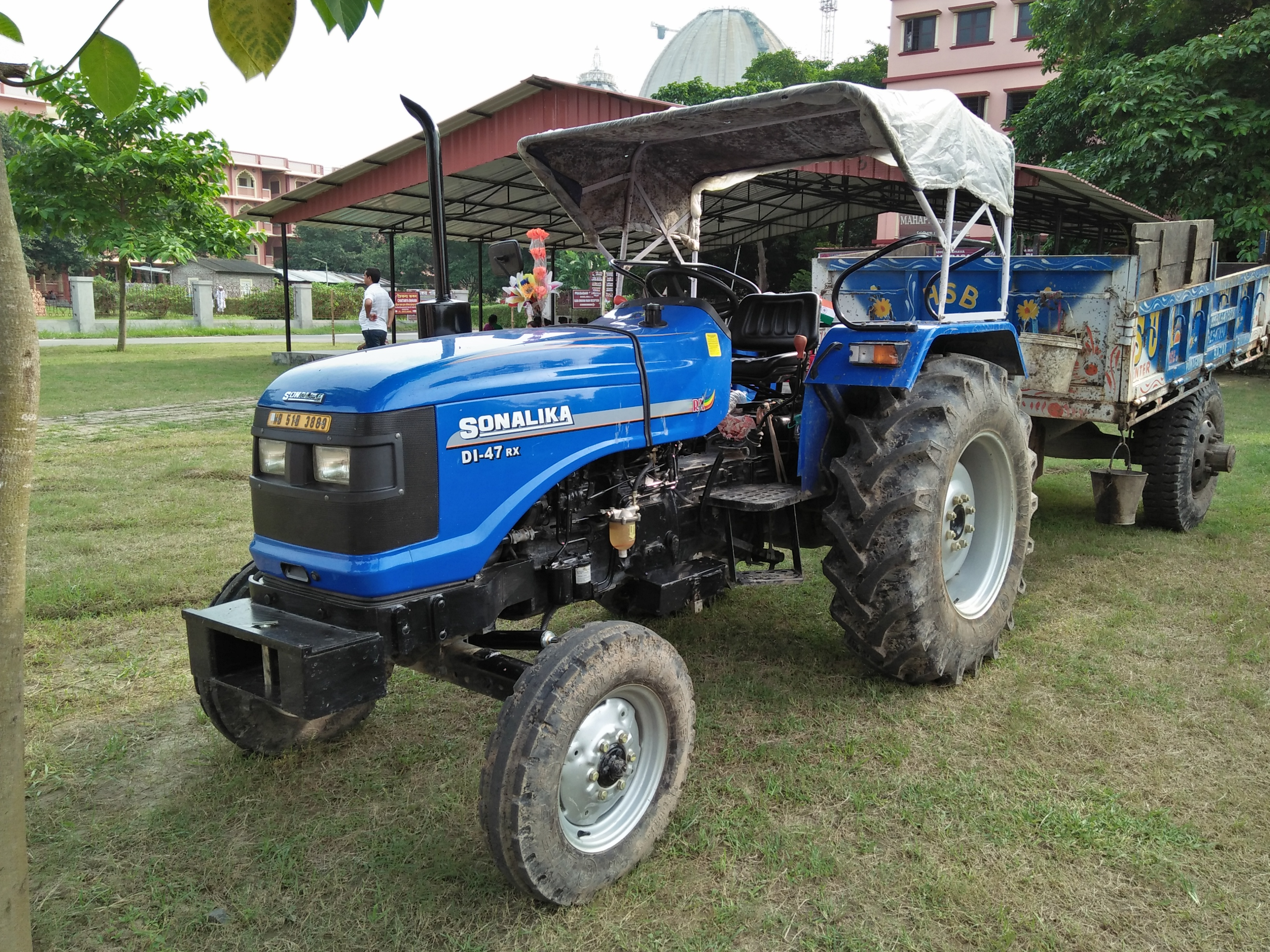
A Sonalika tractor in India

- International Tractors Limited is the major company, involved in manufacturing and exporting tractors, farm equipment and accessories.
- International Cars And Motors Ltd. (ICML) manufactures MUVs, and was established in 2004 with the capacity to manufacture 2,000 vehicles in a month.

Sonalika produces tractors with two brands Sonalika & Solis. They produce tractors from 20 HP to 125HP range.
