= Lakshman Das Mittal =

Indian businessman

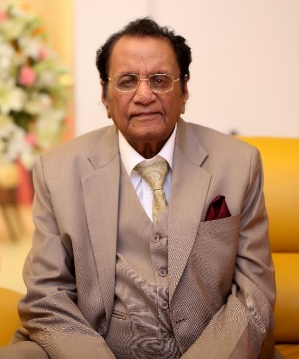
- Born: August 1931 (age 95); Hoshiarpur, Punjab, British India
- Other name: Lachhman Das Mittal
- Education: (M.A.) Panjab University
- Occupation: Businessman
- Years active: 1970–present
- Known for: Founder and Chairman of Sonalika Group
- Title: Chairman, Sonalika Group
- Children: 4, including Usha Sangwan

Lakshman Das Mittal (also spelled as Lachhman Das Mittal; born in Hoshiarpur in August 1931) is an Indian businessman. He is the owner and chairman of the Sonalika Group. He is 82nd richest person of India. with the net worth of US$2.31 billion. He has been the Chairman of Tractor Manufacturer's Association of India and member of National Council of Confederation of Indian Industry.

== Early life and education ==
Lachhman Das Mittal was born in 1931 in Hoshiarpur, Punjab. Mittal earned a Master of Arts degree in English & Urdu from Panjab University. He began his career as an insurance agent with the Life Insurance Corporation of India (LIC). In 1970 he started producing wheat threshers with the help of local blacksmiths in Hoshiarpur, Punjab. The following year his family went bankrupt and by 1970 his net worth was ₹1 lakh (equivalent to ₹54 lakh or US$56,000 in 2026). He said, "Once I applied for dealership of Maruti Udyog but was rejected. Today, I give out dealerships." According to Forbes, Mittal was ranked 82nd among India's richest individuals with a net worth of $2.31 billion.

In the Forbes list of India's 100 richest individuals, published on October 9, 2024, he was ranked 54th with a net worth of $5.69 billion.

== Career ==
Mittal began his business career in 1970 after taking early retirement from the state-owned LIC. Sonalika started manufacturing thrashers in 1970.

In 1970, he founded Sonalika Group, and in 1996, he established Sonalika Tractors, which went on to become India's third-largest tractor manufacturer by market share.

Mittal later transferred the leadership of the Sonalika Group to his sons, Amrit sagar Mittal and Deepak Mittal.
