= Shankar Sahney =

Indian Punjabi pop singer and composer

- Origin: Delhi, India
- Genres: Punjabi pop, Bhangra, devotional
- Occupations: Singer, music composer
- Labels: Tips, T-Series

Shankar Sahney, also credited as Shankar Sahani, is an Indian singer and music composer working in Punjabi pop, bhangra and devotional music. He has released albums on the Indian labels Tips and T-Series.

== Early life ==
Sahney is the youngest son of a professor of music and was introduced to music at the age of three. He is a proponent of the Kirana gharana. After leaving school he trained as a chemical engineer, but returned to music, spending much of his college years working in recording studios as a session guitarist.

== Career ==
=== Punjabi pop ===
Sahney's debut album Yaari-Yaari was released in December 1999. Reviewing a performance in Chandigarh the day after the release, The Tribune described light rhythmic arrangements and simple lyrics as the singer's trademark, and reported a strong audience response to the tracks "Maasha-Alah", "Kudi Kurmuri" and "Highway Te Gaddi". Most of the album's lyrics were written by Sahney himself, with contributions from Dev Kohli, Sanjay Raina and Dev Rishi. The music was composed, produced and arranged by Jawahar Wattal, and the video was choreographed by Shiamak Davar.

A follow-up album, Kudi Kurmari, was also released on Tips. By 2001 The Tribune described Sahney as one of the more popular Punjabi pop singers following the two releases, and noted that one of his songs had been used as the subject of a question on the television quiz programme Kaun Banega Crorepati.

In 2003 Sahney released the album Kede Yaar Nu through T-Series.

=== Later work ===
Sahney has recorded devotional material, including recordings of the Mahamrityunjaya Mantra and other Sanskrit devotional works issued through T-Series. Sahney recorded an eight-track ghazal album with playback singer Asha Bhosle, initially promoted as Wari Jawan Ishq and later released as Dil-E-Nadaan.

In October 2019 he performed "Vaishnava Jana To" with the playback singer S. P. Balasubrahmanyam at an event at the Indian Prime Minister's residence marking Gandhi Jayanti. Following Balasubrahmanyam's death in September 2020, Sahney was among the musicians who paid tribute to him in The Tribune.

In 2019 Sahney received the Gulshan Kumar Award of Excellence in the Bollywood singer category, presented by the Gulshan Kumar Film and Television Institute of India, the educational wing of T-Series.

In September 2023 he postponed a scheduled concert tour of Canada, citing conditions there following a diplomatic dispute between India and Canada.

== Discography ==
Year	Album	Label
1999	Yaari-Yaari	Tips
	Kudi Kurmari	Tips
2003	Kede Yaar Nu	T-Series
2015	Dil-E-Nadaan (with Asha Bhosle)	Mom Music

== Politics ==
In November 2014 Sahney joined the Bharatiya Janata Party at an event in New Delhi alongside the former MLA Harsharan Singh Balli.
