= District Gazetteer =

The District Gazetteer is a comprehensive geographical, economic, social and cultural catalogue of the Indian subcontinent catalogued by the British Viceroy during the conquest of India. Most of the catalogues were compiled initially in the late 19th century although many have since been reissued or edited in recent times. They covered demographics, linguistics, education, and culture.

Until the publication of the Gazetteers, an attempt to systematically catalogue Indian geography and culture was not available, with the closest approximation being Abu'l Fazl's Ain-I-Akbari, compiled during the reign of Akbar the Great. While many of the Gazetteers are available to the public, their accuracy is a subject of much dispute among academics and scholars. They are still not to be neglected in that they are one of the more comprehensive attempts by a third-party source to catalogue the immense cultural history of the Indian subcontinent. In British Punjab, the colonial administrators first commissioned revenue, settlement, and administrative reports for the district in both English and Urdu, being followed by Urdu-language tarikhs (histories) on each district between the 1850s–70s. These were followed-up with English-language District Gazatteers in the late 19th century.
