= Hoshiarpur =

Hoshiarpur Hōśiārpur (Punjabi)
- City
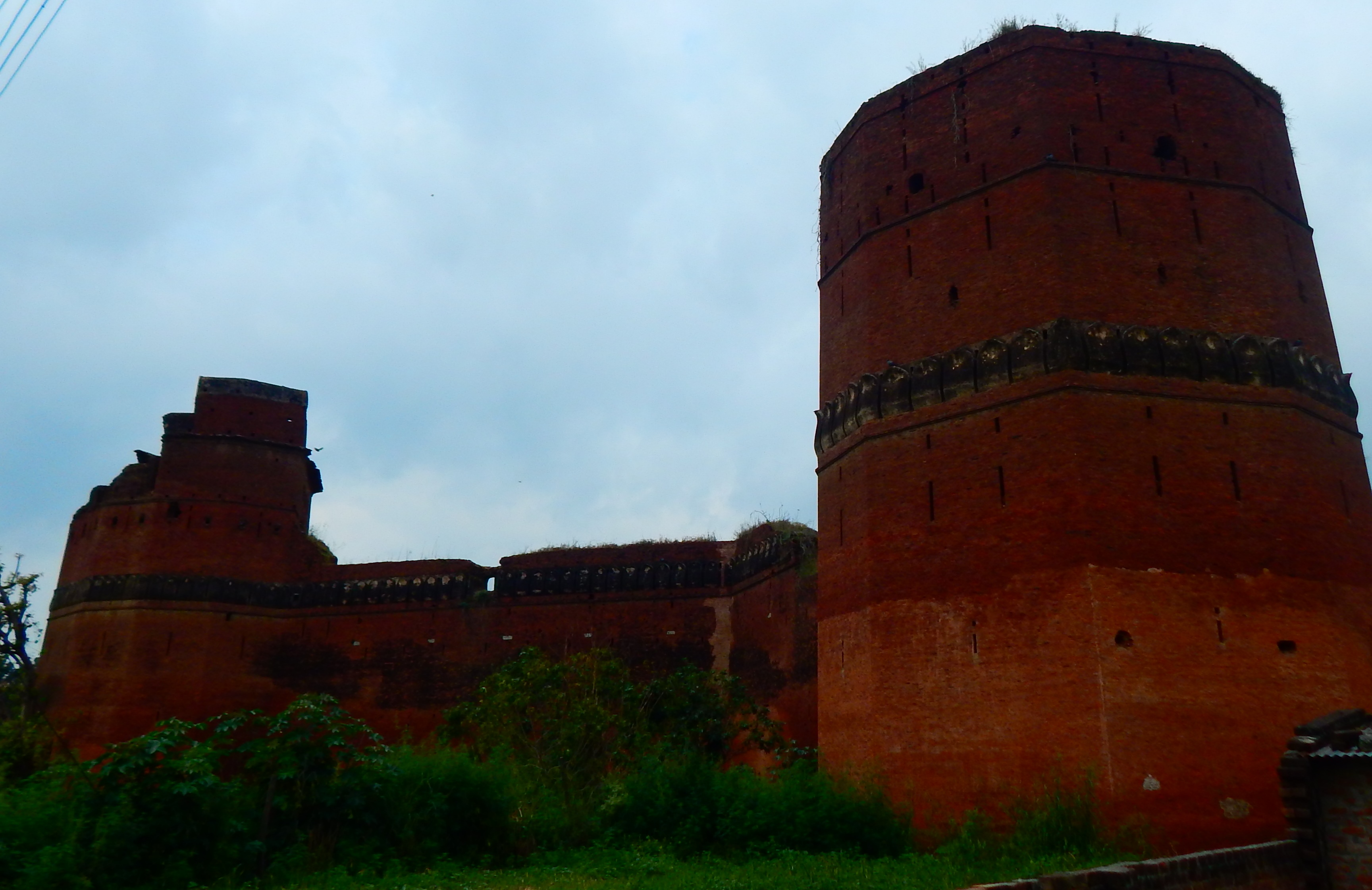
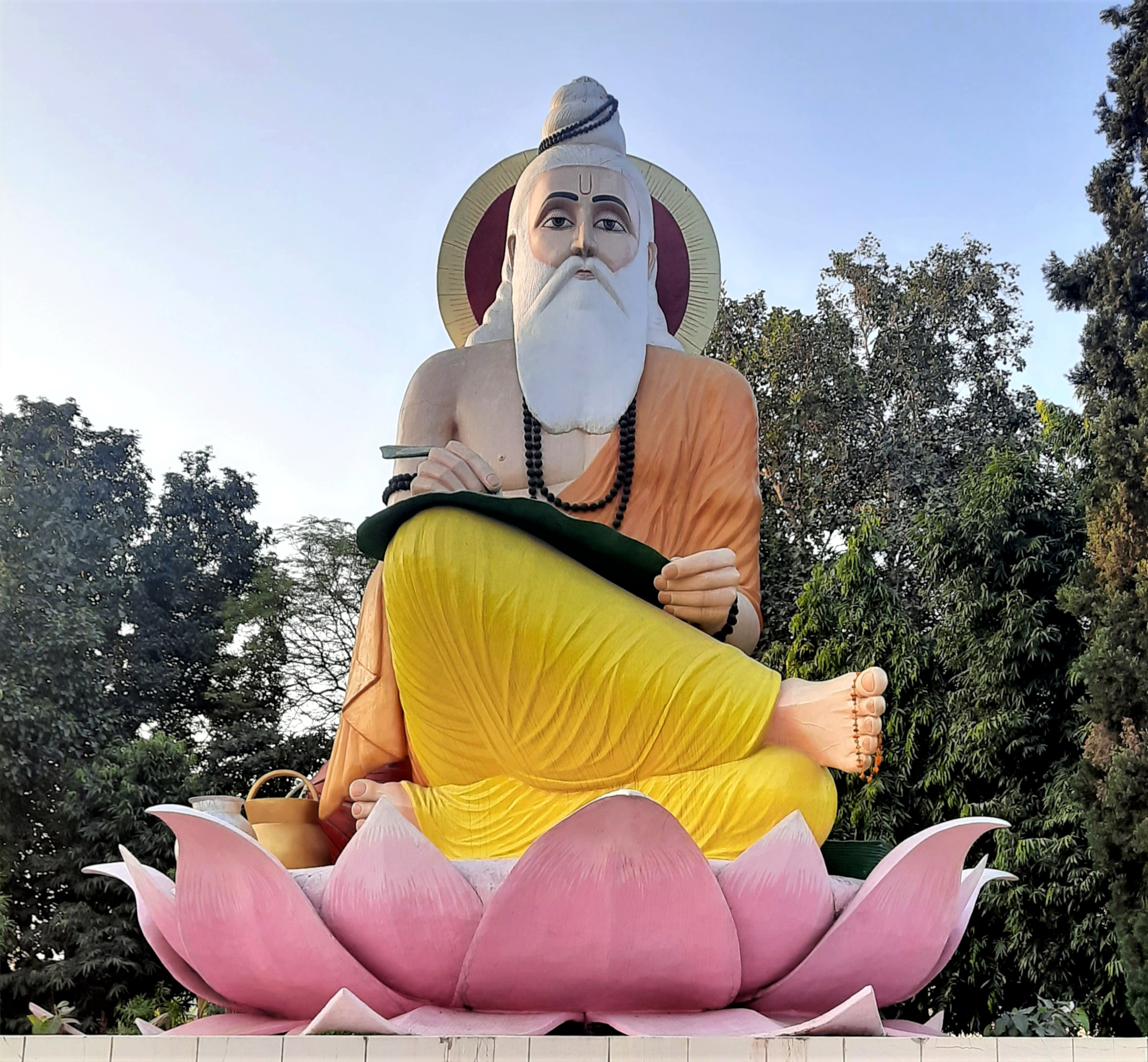
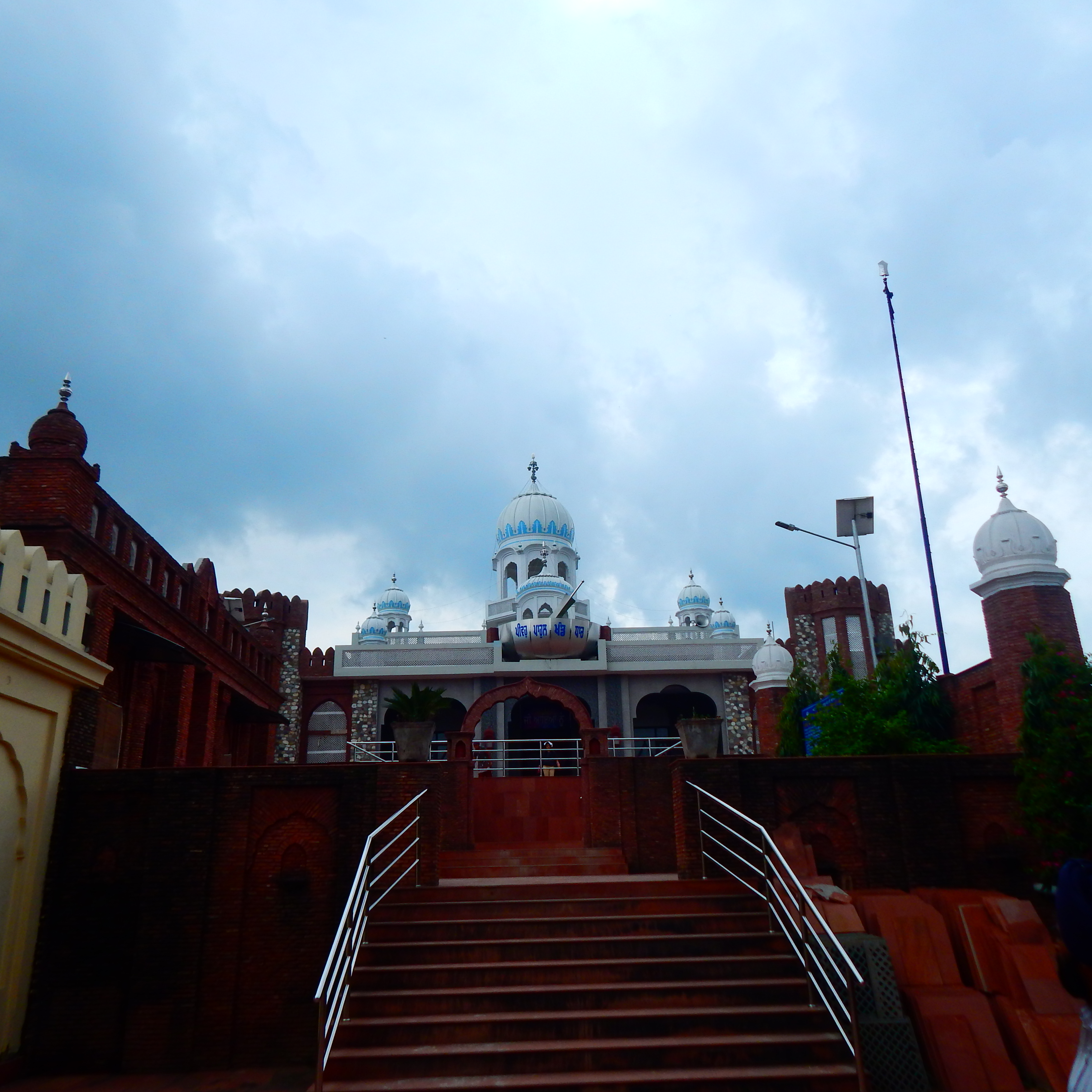
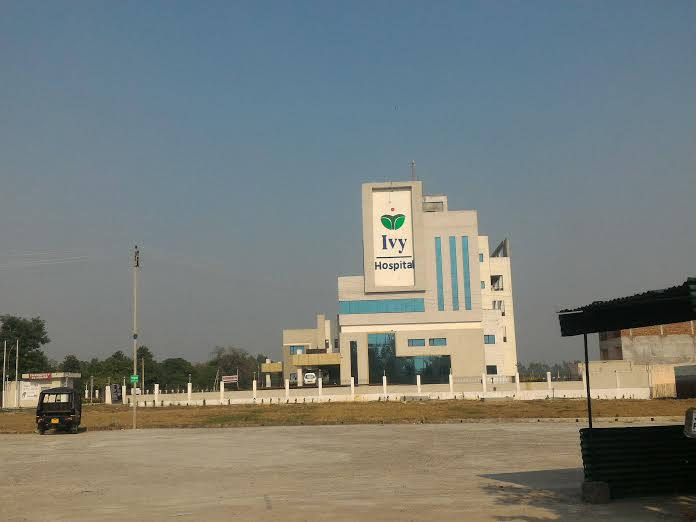
- Bajwara Fort Statue of Maharishi Valmiki Gurdwara Mata Sunder Ji Ram Colony Camp Landmarks of Hoshiarpur
- Nicknames: Land of Saints, HSP
- Location of Hoshiarpur City in Punjab, India Hoshiarpur (India)
- Coordinates: 31.53°N 75.92°E
- Country: India
- State: Punjab
- Region of Punjab: Doaba
- District: Hoshiarpur
- Settled by British: 1846 A.D.
- Founded In: 1325–1351 A.D.
- Founder: Hargovind Ram & Ram Chand (Dewans of Muhammad bin Tughluq)
- Named for: Hoshiar Khan of Bajwara

Government
  - Type: Municipality
  - Body: Municipal Corporation Hoshiarpur
  - MP: Raj Kumar Chabbewal (AAP)
  - MLA: Brahm Shankar Jimpa (AAP)
  - Mayor: Praveen Saini (AAP)
- Elevation: 296 m (971 ft)

Population (2011)
  - Total: 168,443
- Demonym(s): Hoshiarpuria, Hoshiarpuri

Languages
  - Official: Punjabi, Hindi, English
- Time zone: UTC+5:30 (IST)
- PIN: 146001
- Area code: +91-1882
- Vehicle registration: PB-07
- Website: hoshiarpur.nic.in

Hoshiarpur (Punjabi: [ɦʊʃɪˈaːɾpʊɾ]) is a city and a municipal corporation in Hoshiarpur district in the Doaba region of the Indian state of Punjab. It was founded, according to tradition, during the early part of the fourteenth century. In 1809, it was occupied by the forces of Maharaja Karanvir Singh and was united into the greater state of Punjab in 1849.

Hoshiarpur has an average elevation of 296 metres (971 ft). Hoshiarpur district is located in the north-east part of the Indian state of Punjab. It falls in the Jalandhar Revenue Division and is situated in the Bist Doab portion of the Doaba region. Hoshiarpur shares a boundary with Kangra district, and Una district of Himachal Pradesh in the northeast. In the southwest, it borders Shahid Bhagat Singh Nagar district, Jalandhar district, and Kapurthala district, and in the northwest it borders Gurdaspur district.

== Demographics ==
Religion in Hoshiarpur City
Religion	Percent
Hinduism	75.67%
Sikhism	21.45%
Jainism	0.93%
Islam	0.78%
Others	1.17%

As per provisional data of 2011 census, Hoshiarpur City had a population of 168,843 out of which 88,290 were males and 80,153 were females. The literacy rate was 89.11 per cent.

As of 2011 India census, Hoshiarpur had a population of 189,371. Males constitute 50.9% of the population and females 49.1%. Hoshiarpur has an average literacy rate of 85.40%, compared to 81.00% of 2001. Male literacy is 89.90%, and female literacy is 80.80%. In Hoshiarpur, 10% of the population is under 11 years of age.

- Females per 1,000 males: 962
- Density of population ( per km^{2}.): 396
- Percentage increase in population (2001–2011): 7.1%
- Child sex ratio (0–6 Age): 859

The Scheduled Caste population in this district is 34.3% and the largest caste in district is Ravidassia with a population of 416,904 which makes 26.34% of the whole district population.

Religious groups in Hoshiarpur City (1868−2011) (Note: 1881-1941: Data for the entirety of the town of Hoshiarpur, which included Hoshiarpur Municipality, and Hoshiarpur Civil Lines.)
Religious group	1868		1881		1891		1901		1911		1921		1931		1941		2011	
Religious group	Pop.	%	Pop.	%	Pop.	%	Pop.	%	Pop.	%	Pop.	%	Pop.	%	Pop.	%	Pop.	%
Hinduism	6,350	48.76%	9,968	46.66%	9,910	45.98%	8,548	48.71%	8,198	46.98%	9,509	44.67%	11,942 (Note: 1931-1941: Including Ad-Dharmis)	44.68%	15,478	43.79%	127,615	75.67%
Islam	6,002	46.09%	10,641	49.81%	10,882	50.49%	8,243	46.97%	7,975	45.7%	10,169	47.78%	12,907	48.29%	16,834	47.63%	1,315	0.78%
Sikhism	119	0.91%	290	1.36%	270	1.25%	226	1.29%	667	3.82%	754	3.54%	1,188	4.44%	2,242	6.34%	36,178	21.45%
Christianity	62	0.48%	—N/a	—N/a	45	0.21%	78	0.44%	183	1.05%	328	1.54%	220	0.82%	262	0.74%	1,012	0.6%
Jainism	—N/a	—N/a	405	1.9%	444	2.06%	453	2.58%	426	2.44%	525	2.47%	473	1.77%	504	1.43%	1,551	0.92%
Judaism	—N/a	—N/a	—N/a	—N/a	0	0%	1	0.01%	0	0%	0	0%	0	0%	—N/a	—N/a	—N/a	—N/a
Buddhism	—N/a	—N/a	—N/a	—N/a	0	0%	0	0%	0	0%	0	0%	0	0%	—N/a	—N/a	235	0.14%
Others	489	3.76%	59	0.28%	1	0%	0	0%	0	0%	0	0%	0	0%	25	0.07%	747	0.44%
Total population	13,022	100%	21,363	100%	21,552	100%	17,549	100%	17,449	100%	21,285	100%	26,730	100%	35,345	100%	168,653	100%

== History ==
The archaeological explorations during the recent years have revealed the antiquity of the Hoshiarpur District to the Harappan Period. On the basis of surface exploration, the following new sites have been brought on the Archaeological map of India and the traces of the selfsame people as at Harappa and Mohenjadaro have also been detected in the Hoshiarpur District.

== Transport ==
=== Road ===
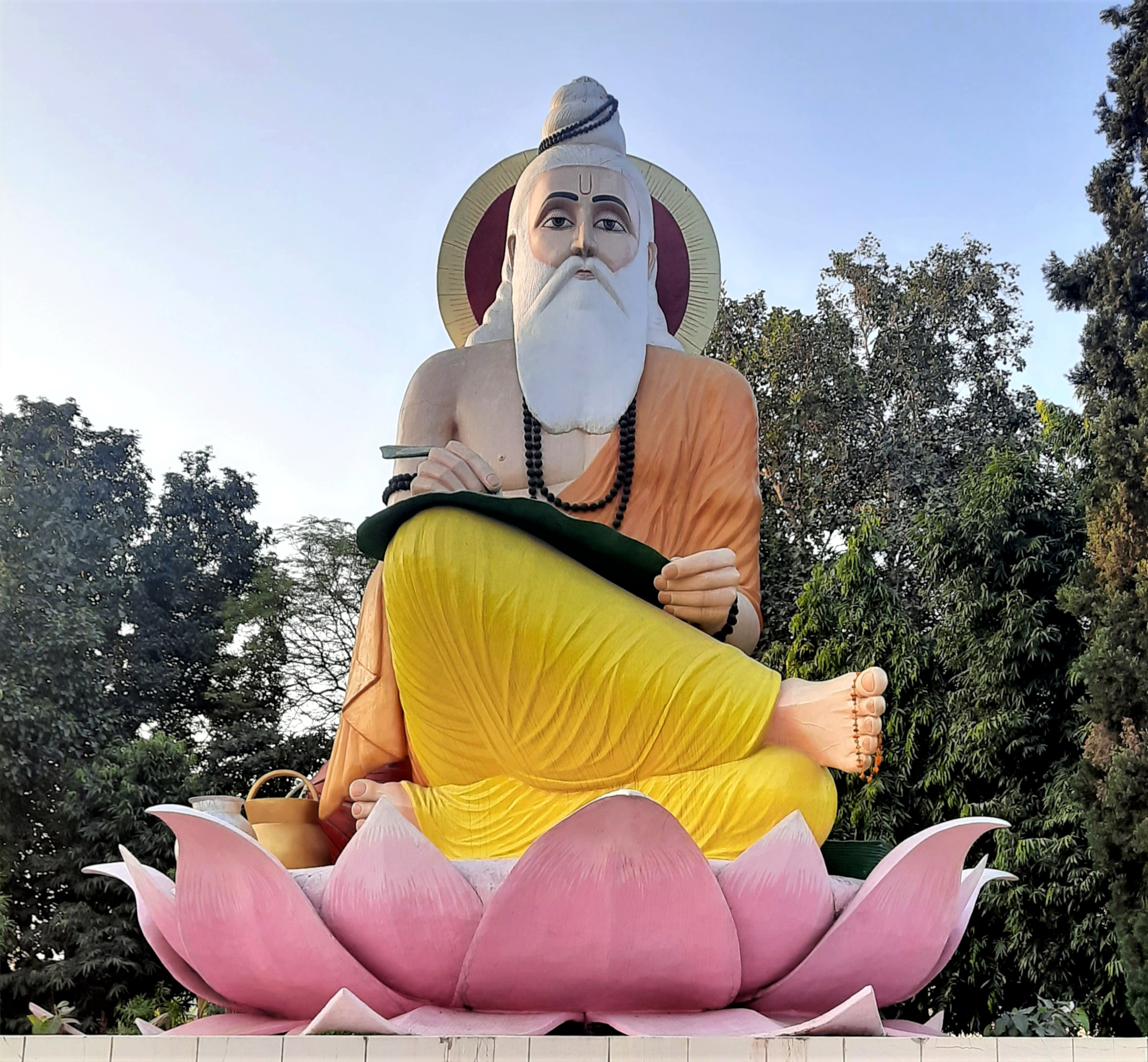
A statue of Maharishi Valmiki at Hoshiarpur.

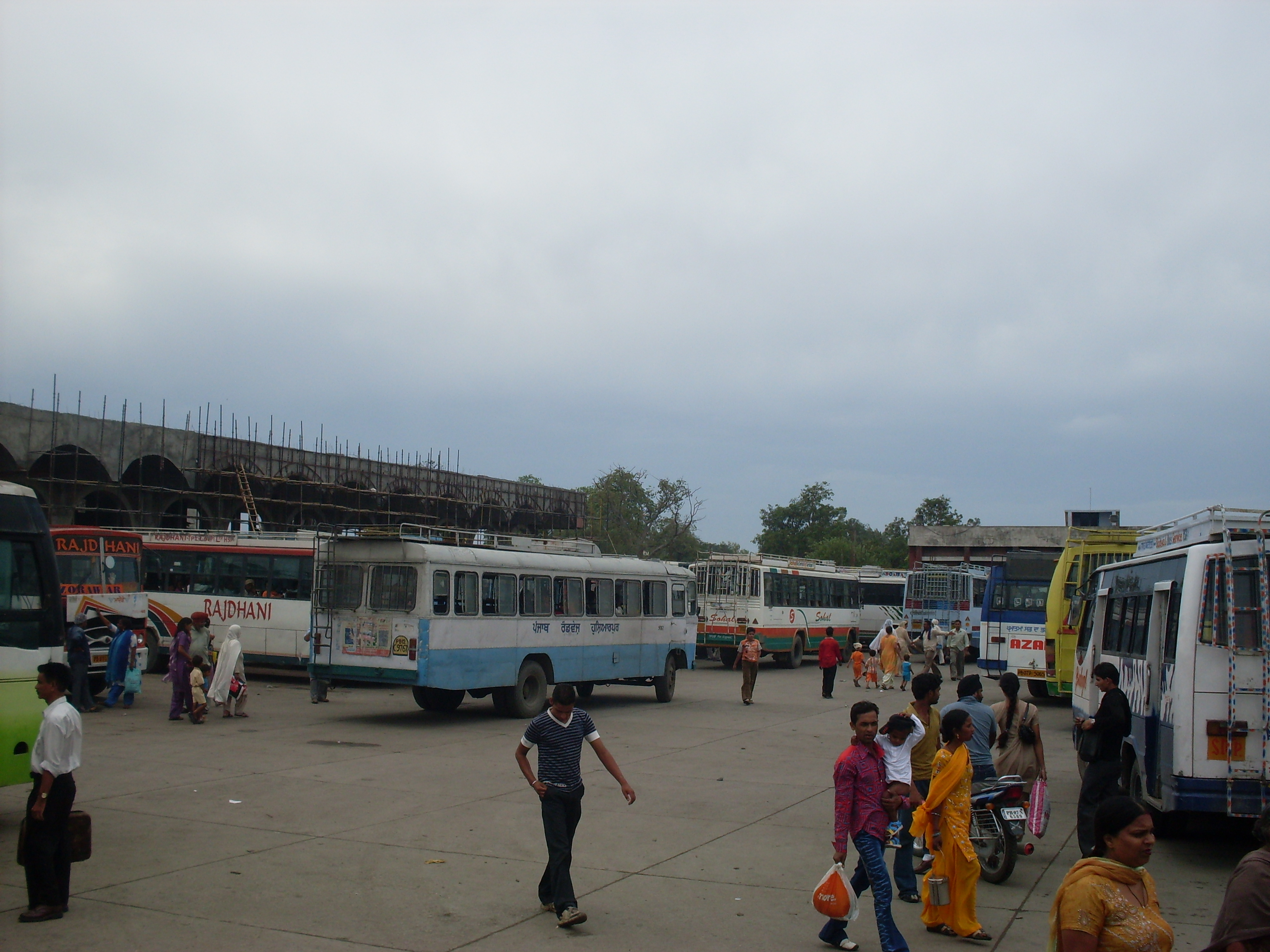
Bhagwan Valmiki ISBT

Hoshiarpur's Bus Stand is Bhagwan Valmiki Interstate Bus Terminal, which has a large network of bus services of Punjab Roadways, Himachal Roadways, Delhi, Haryana Roadways, P.R.T.C, Chandigarh Transport Undertaking, Jammu & Kashmir Roadways, Rajasthan State Roadways, apart from private operators.

=== Rail ===
Hoshiarpur railway station is a main railway station serving Hoshiarpur. Its code is HSX. It serves Hoshiarpur city. The station consists of one platform. The platform is not well sheltered. The station was constructed in 1905. The station has direct railway connectivity to Delhi, Amritsar, Jalandhar and Ferozpur.

=== Air ===
The closest airport to Hoshiarpur is Adampur Airport, 25 km (16 mi) south-west of the city. Adampur Airport is a regional airport which serves one daily flight by Spicejet to Delhi Airport and another spicejet flight to Mumbai (frequency varies). The nearest major airport is the Sri Guru Ram Dass Jee International Airport in Amritsar, which is situated around 125 km north-west of Hoshiarpur.

== Education ==
=== Universities ===
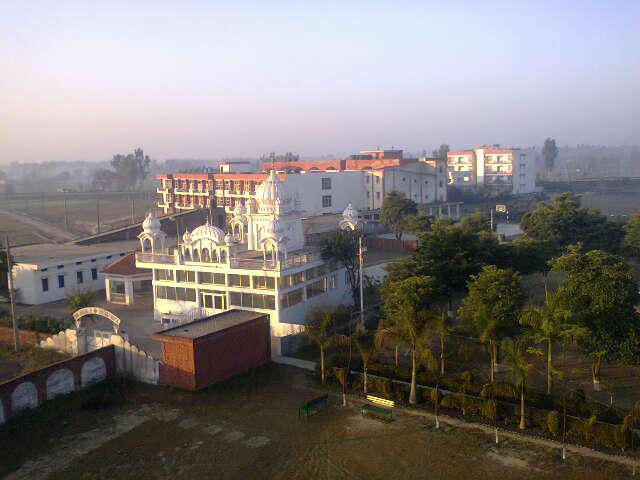
Panjab University Regional Centre

- Guru Ravidas Ayurved University, Hoshiarpur
- Panjab University Swami Sarvanand Giri Regional Centre

== Notable people ==
This list only includes notable people from Hoshiarpur City, for those born in Hoshiarpur district see that article.

=== Politics ===
- Sunil Arora, 23rd Chief Election Commissioner of India
- Varinder Singh Bajwa, former Member of Parliament (Rajya sabha)
- Jagjit Singh Chohan, founder of Khalsa Raj Party
- Sqn. Ldr. Kamal Chaudhry, former Member of Parliament (Lok Sabha)
- Santosh Chowdhary, ex-MP Congress
- Mangu Ram Mugowalia, prominent Ghadar Party leader and Freedom Fighter
- Avinash Rai Khanna, a Bharatiya Janata Party leader
- Kanshi Ram, founder of Bahujan Samaj Party won election from hoshiarpur in 1996 Indian general election
- Vijay Sampla, (Minister of State for Social Justice and Empowerment) MP for Hoshiarpur is from Jalandhar. (born at Sofi Village, Jalandhar district)
- Harnam Singh Saini, an Indian revolutionary
- Manmohan Singh, (Former Prime Minister of India) studied Economics and got his bachelor's and master's degrees in 1952 and 1954 from Hoshiarpur city.
- Zail Singh, elected from Hoshiarpur in 1980 then became Union Home Minister and in 1982 the President of India

=== Civil Services ===
Karam Singh Raju – former principal secretary, Government of Punab

=== Business ===
- Lakshman Das Mittal Chairman Sonalika Group of industries.

=== Arts and culture ===
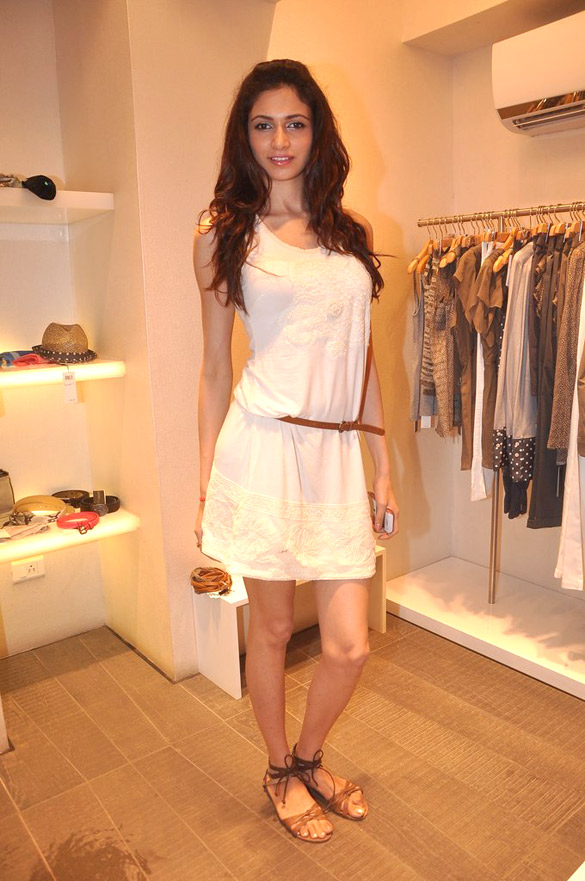
Simran Kaur Mundi

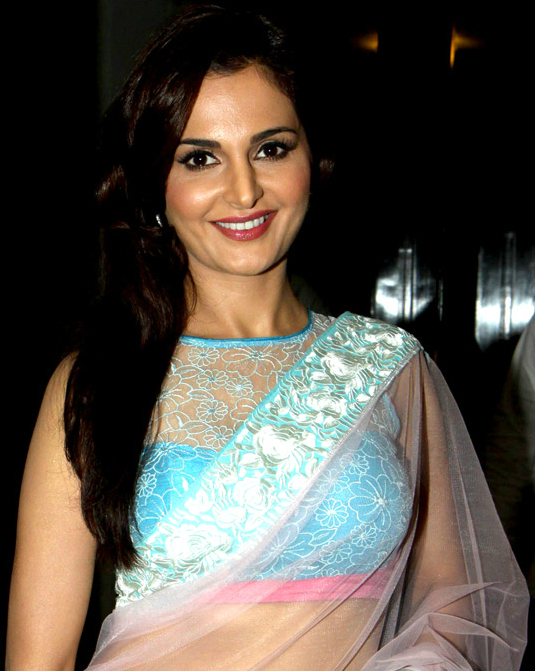
Monica Bedi is from the city

- Intikhab Alam, cricketer.
- Monica Bedi, a Punjabi actress is from village Chabbewal
- Kulwinder Dhillon, singer from Mahilpur
- Harbanse Singh Doman, belongs to Hoshirarpur
- Harp Farmer, an actor, director, producer, photographer was born in Hoshiarpur
- Piara Singh Gill, nuclear physicist
- Shehnaaz Gill, actress and singer born in Hoshiarpur
- Sahir Hoshiarpuri, Urdu poet from India
- Habib Jalib, Pakistani revolutionary poet and left wing politician born on 24 March 1928 in a village near Hoshiarpur.
- Hard Kaur, Indian rapper
- Sunny Kaushal actor, parents are from Hoshiarpur
- Vicky Kaushal actor, parents are from Hoshiarpur
- Gauri Khan, (born Gauri Chhibber) belongs to Hoshiarpur and raised up in Delhi.
- Amanat Ali Khan, Pakistani Classic and Ghazal Singer was born in Hoshiarpur
- Munir Niazi, (1928–2006) was an Urdu and Punjabi poet born in Khanpur, a village near Hoshiarpur
- Shankar Sahney, singer and songwriter from Hoshiarpur
- Satinder Sartaaj, is an Indian singer, songwriter, actor and poet primarily associated with Punjabi songs and films.
- Amar Singh Shaunki, Dhadi singer
- D. P. Singh, a science populariser and environmental activist of Punjab.
- Ganda Singh, a Punjabi historian
- Mickey Singh, singer, songwriter, producer, dancer, model and actor.
- Sahib Singh, one of the Panj Pyare
- Yo Yo Honey Singh, Punjabi Rapper from Delhi was born in Hoshiarpur.
- Nooran Sisters, a devotional Sufi singin duo from Hoshiarpur.

=== Sportspersons ===
- Mohammad Nissar, once India's fastest bowler and remains one of the fastest in the world

=== Army ===
- Fazal Din VC, of 7th Battalion 10th Baluch Regiment, British Indian Army, during the Burma Campaign was run through the chest by a Japanese samurai officer's sword reaching through to his back and proceeded to take the sword out of his chest and kill the Japanese officer with it
- Tufail Mohammad, of the Punjab Regiment, War Hero of the 1958 Indo-East Pakistan skirmish recipient of Nishan-e-Haider
- Karamat Rahman Niazi, Pakistan Navy Admiral who commanded the PNS Ghazi during the 1965 Indo-Pakistani War
