= Punjab, India =

State in northwestern India

Punjab
- State
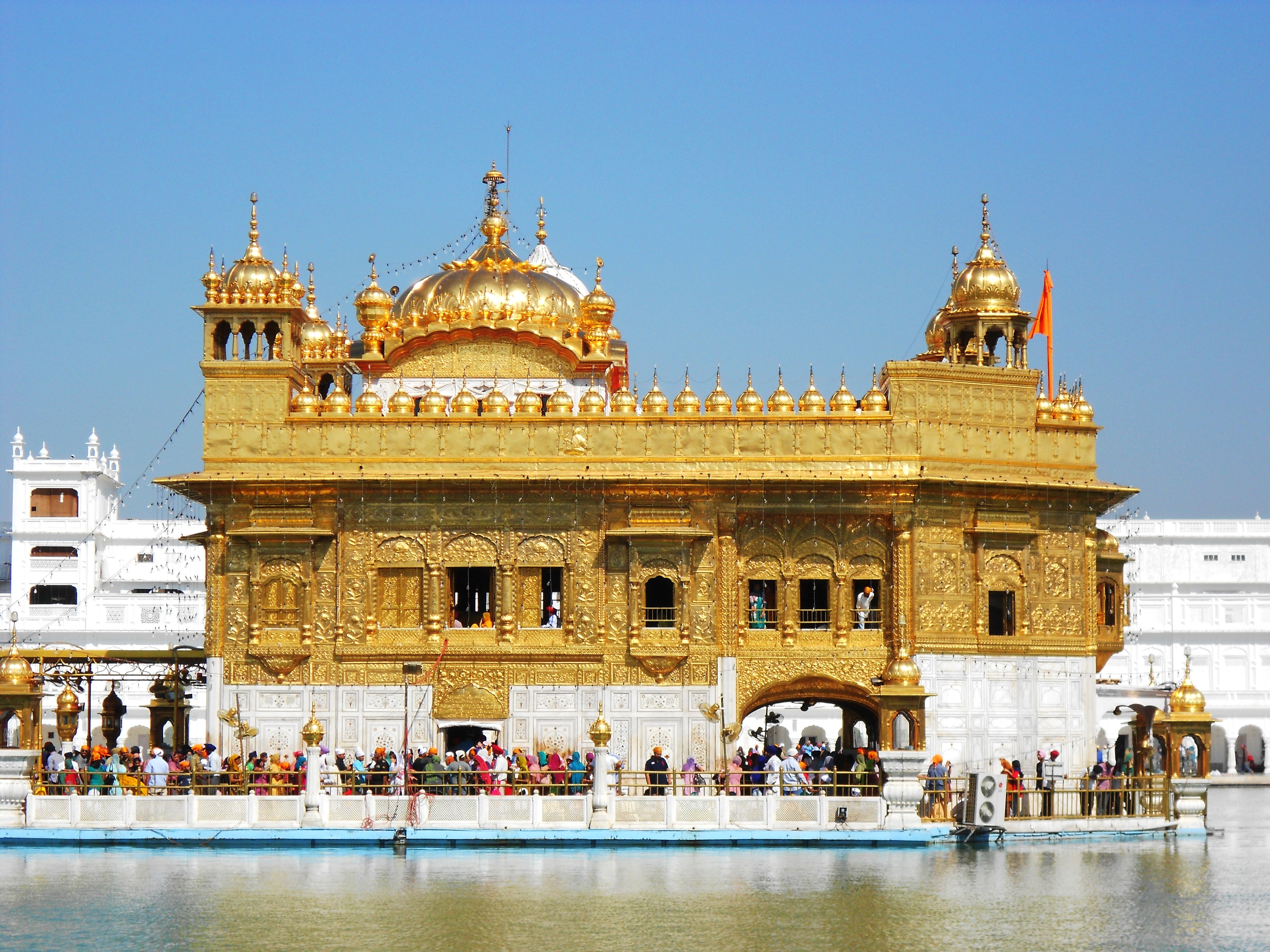
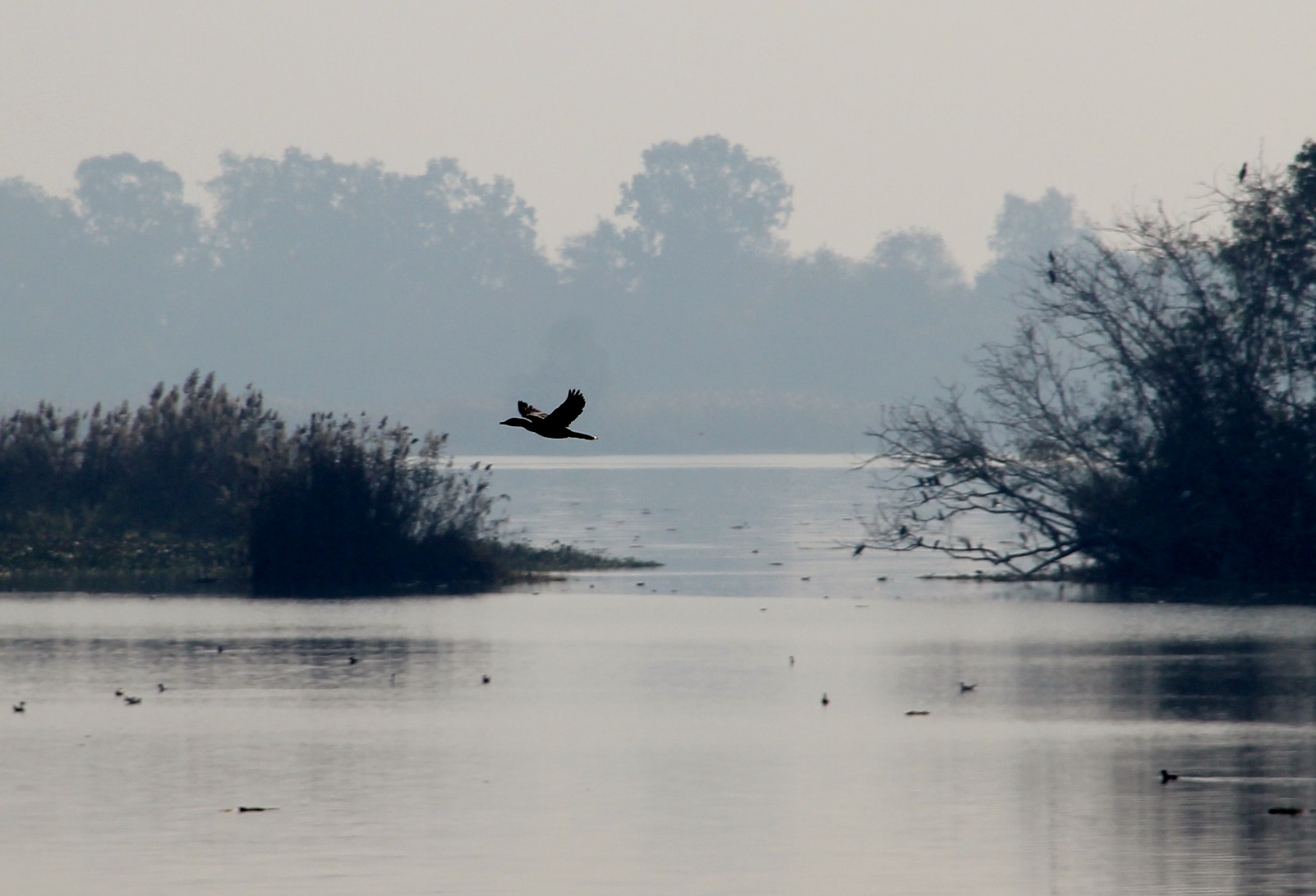
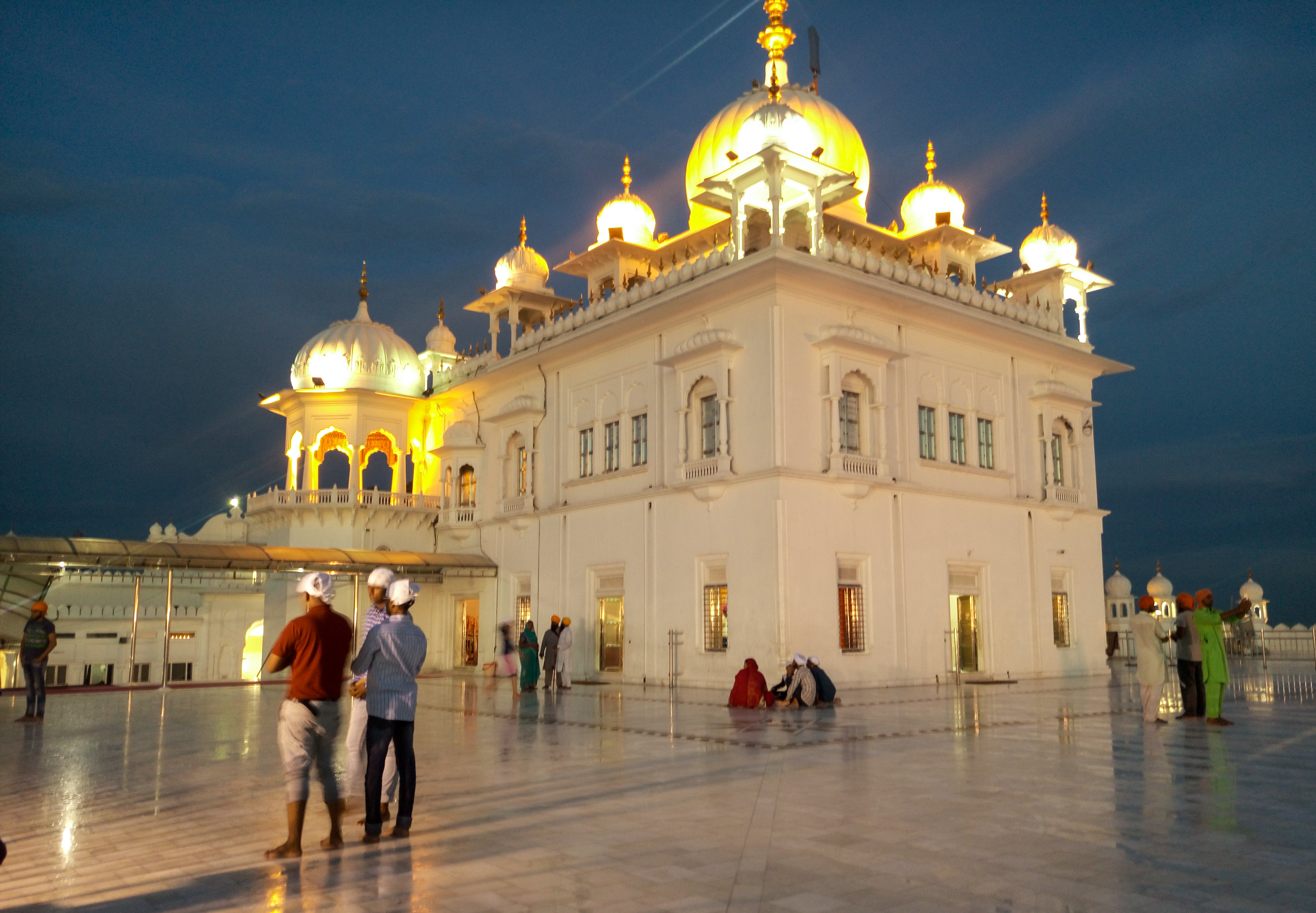
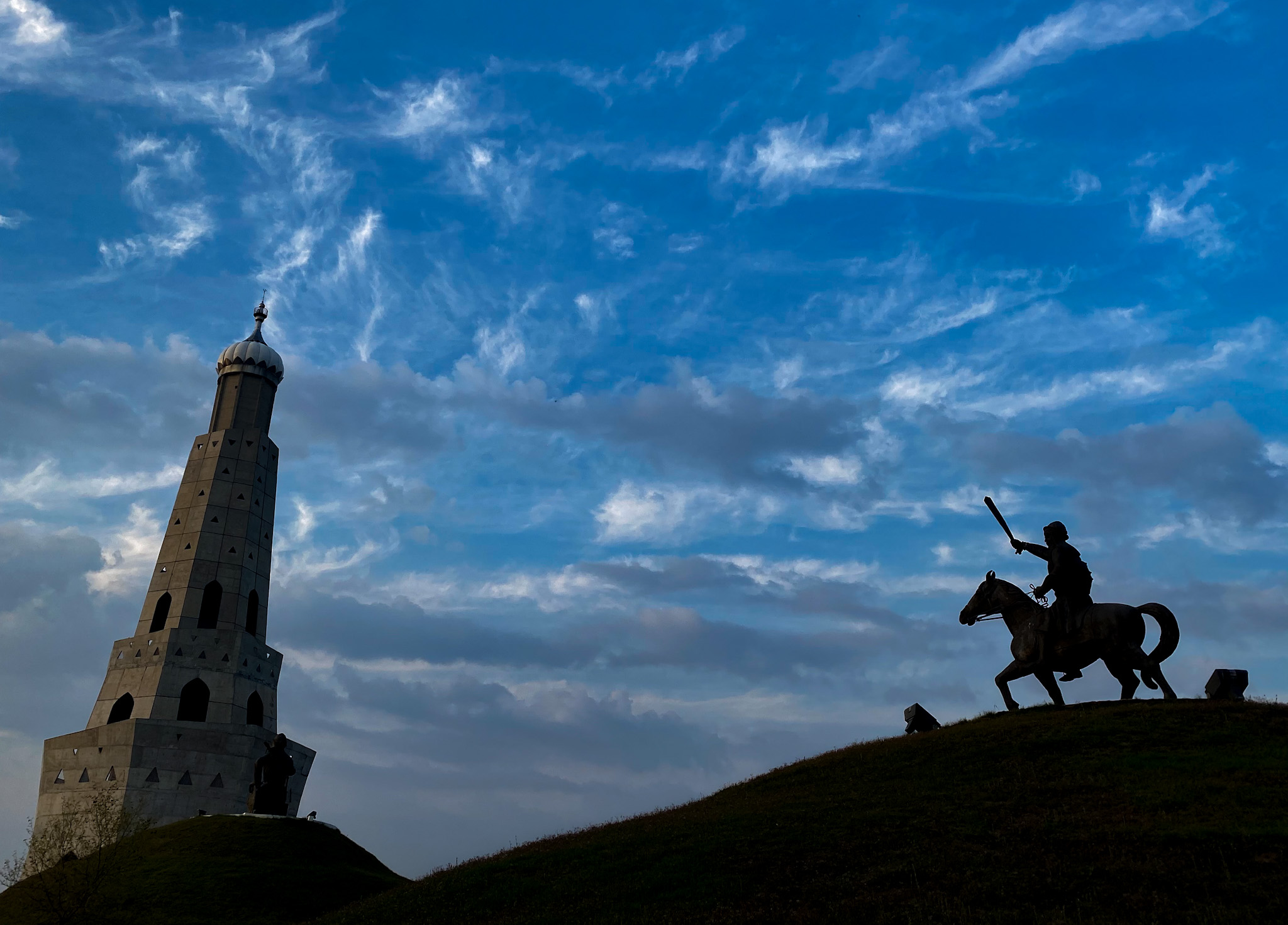
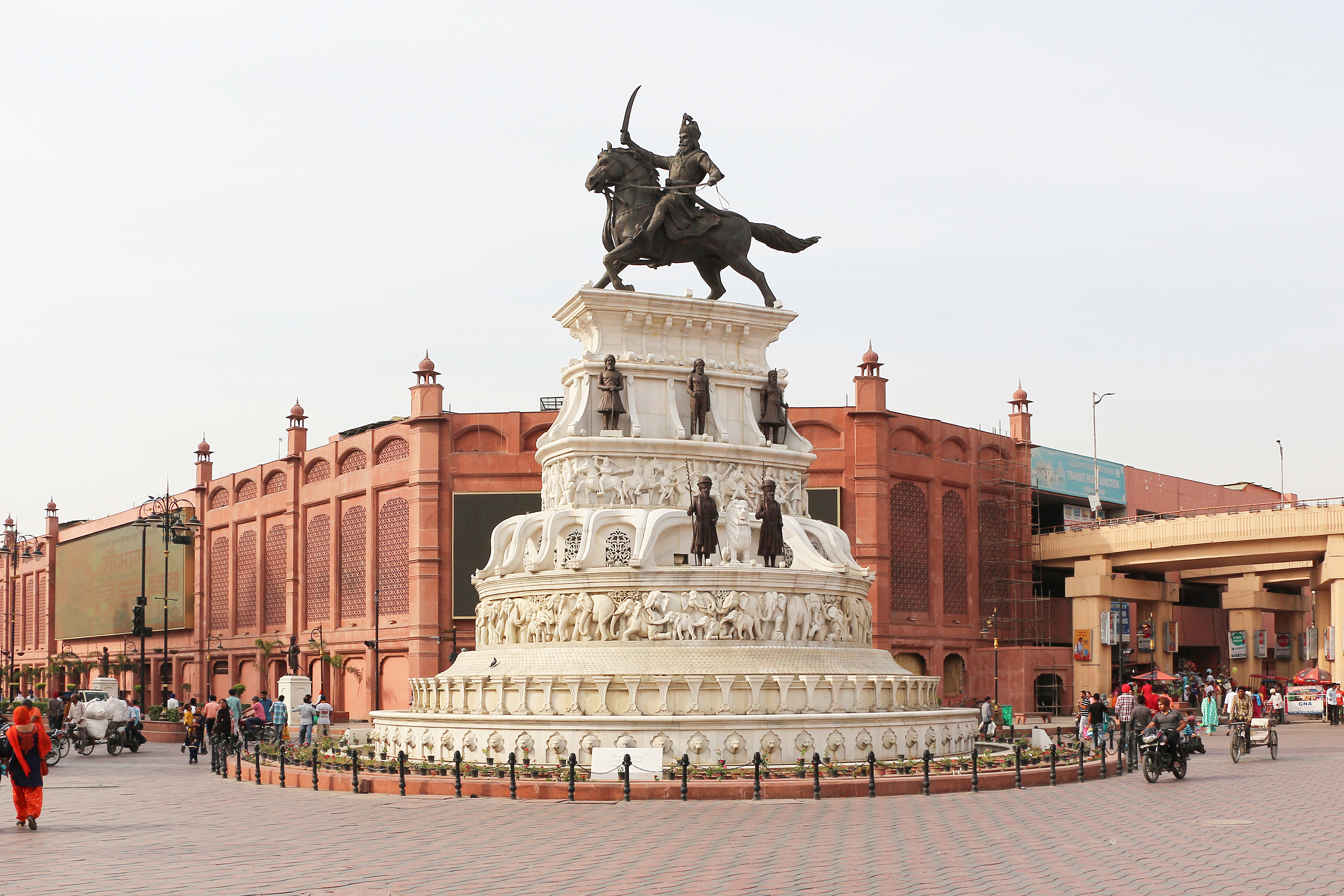
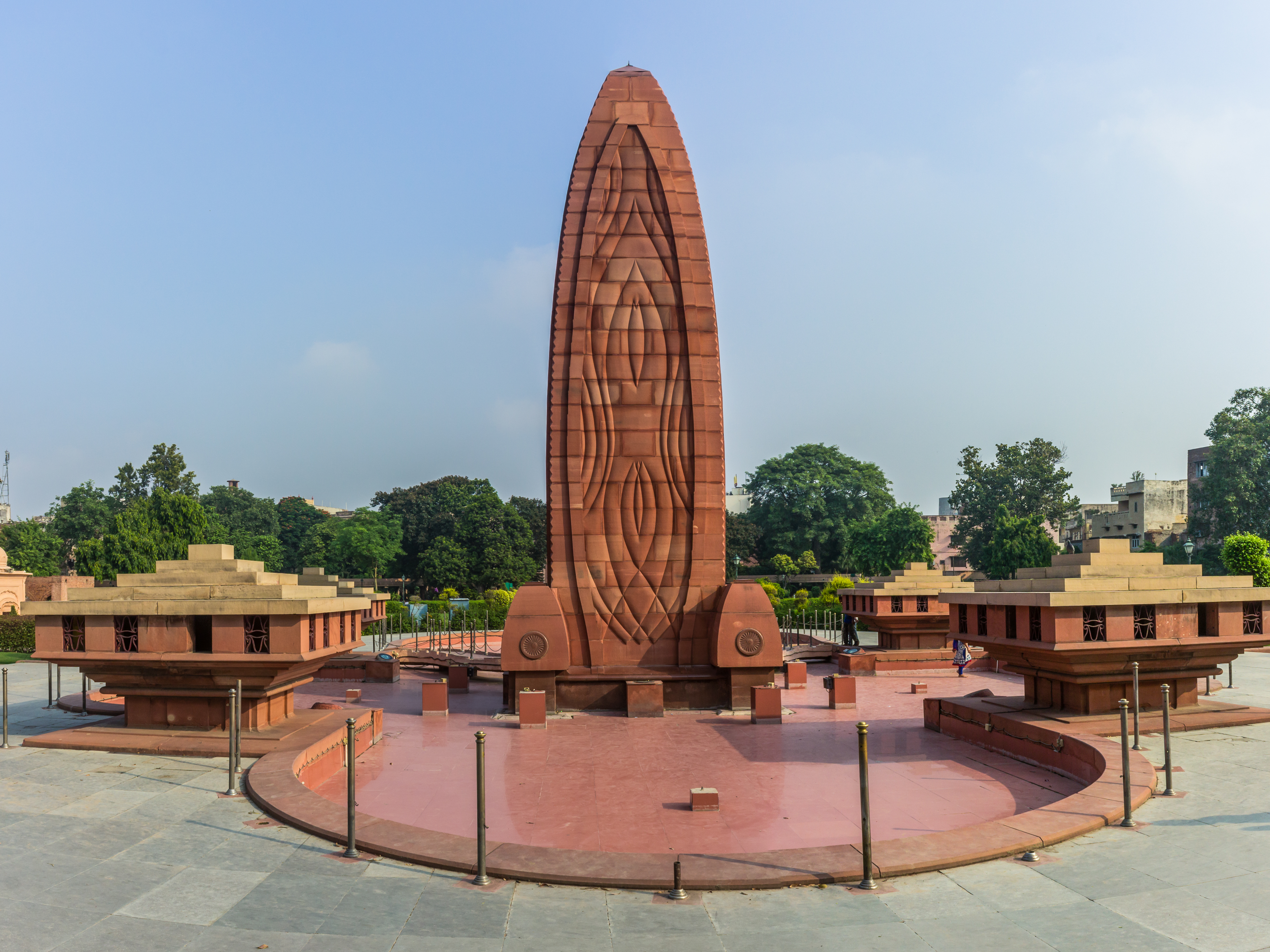
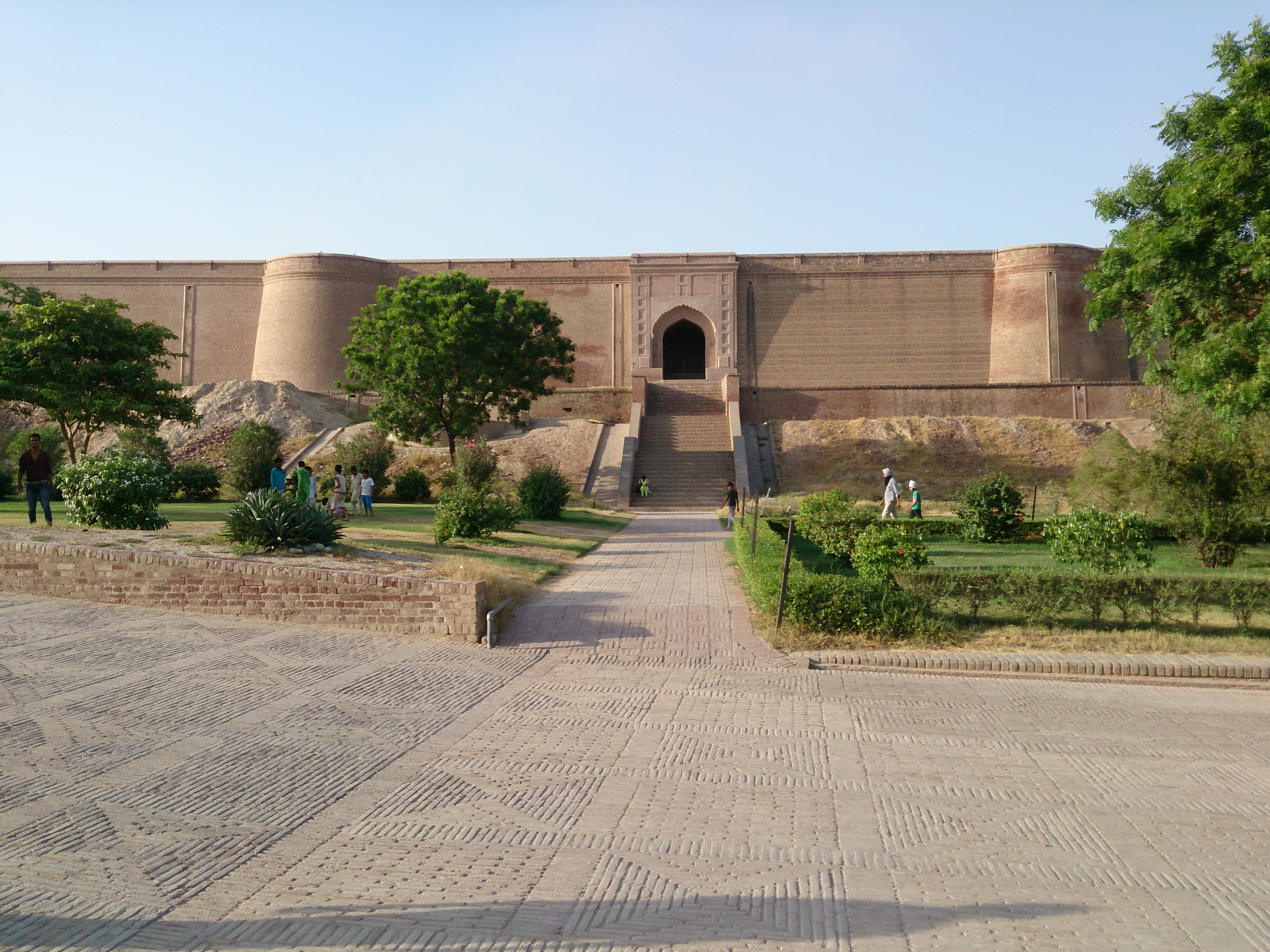
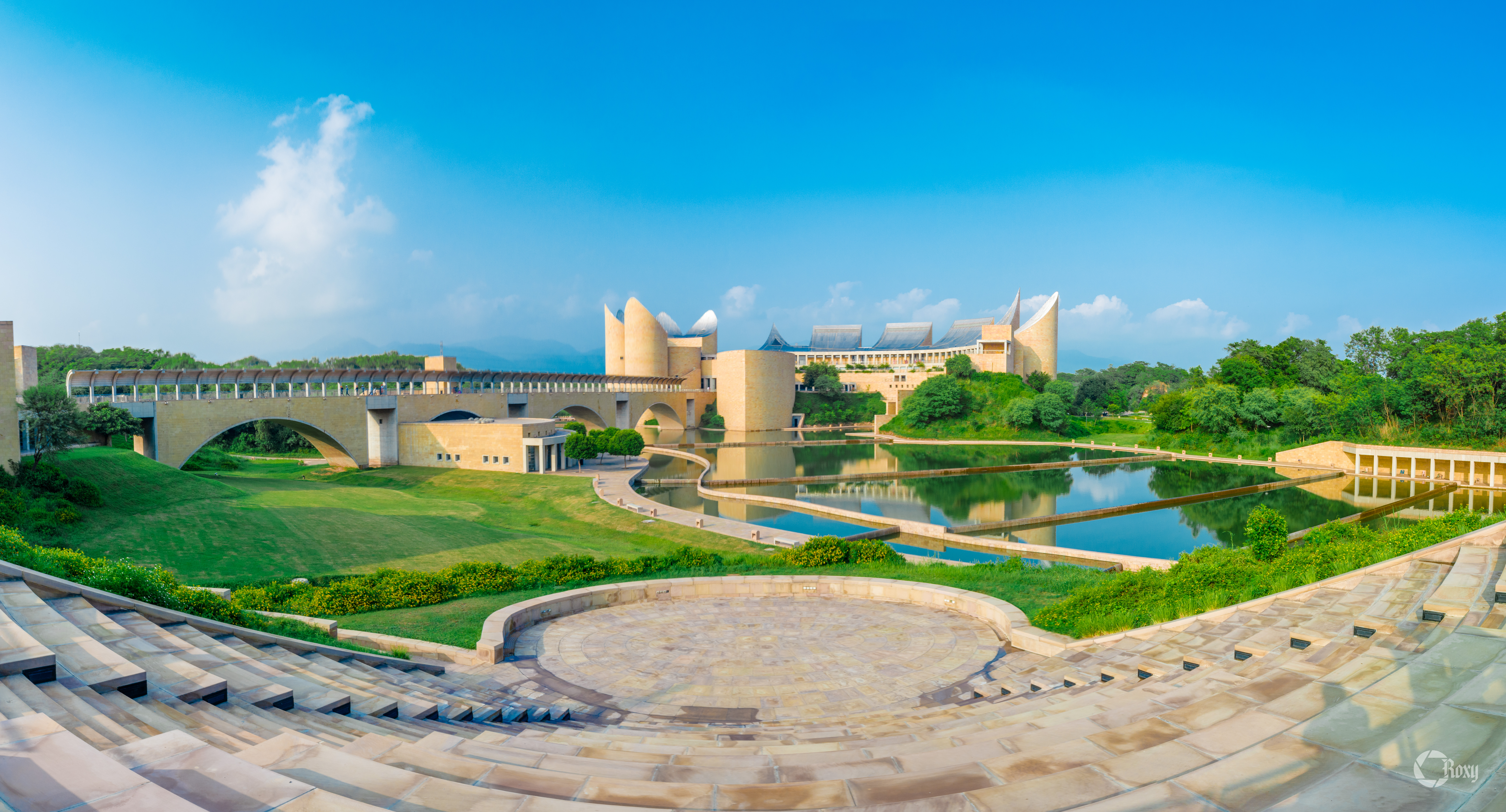
- Golden Temple Harike Wetland Takht Kesgarh Sahib Fateh Burj Heritage Street Jallianwala Bagh memorial Qila Mubarak Virasat-e-Khalsa

- Emblem of Punjab
- Etymology: "Land of five rivers"
- Motto: Satyameva Jayate (Sanskrit) "Truth alone triumphs"
- Location of Punjab in India
- Coordinates: 30.79°N 75.84°E
- Country: India
- Region: North India
- Previously was: East Punjab; PEPSU
- Formation: 26 January 1950; 1 November 1966 (reorganisation)
- Capital: Chandigarh
- Largest city: Ludhiana
- Largest metro: Ludhiana
- Districts: 23

Government
  - Body: Government of Punjab
  - Governor: Gulab Chand Kataria
  - Chief Minister: Bhagwant Mann (AAP)

Area
  - Total: 50,362 km^{2} (19,445 sq mi)
  - Rank: 20th
- Highest elevation (Unnamed peak of Naina Devi Range): 1,000 m (3,300 ft)
- Lowest elevation (Sutlej River): 105 m (344 ft)

Population (2025)
  - Total: ▲31,188,000
  - Rank: 16th
  - Density: 550/km^{2} (1,400/sq mi)
  - Urban: 42.55%
  - Rural: 57.45%
- Demonym: Punjabis

Language
  - Official: Punjabi
  - Official script: Gurmukhi script

GDP
  - Total (2026–27 est.): ▲₹9.8 lakh crore (US$100 billion) (nominal) ▲ ~US$475 billion (PPP)
  - Rank: 16th
  - Per capita: ▲₹230,523 (US$2,500) (nominal) (2025–26) ▲ ~US$11,360 (PPP) (19th)
- Time zone: UTC+05:30 (IST)
- ISO 3166 code: IN-PB
- Vehicle registration: PB
- HDI (2023): ▲0.740 High (12th)
- Literacy (2024): 83.4% (23rd)
- Sex ratio (2025): 906♀/1000 ♂ (25th)
- Website: punjab.gov.in
- Symbols of Punjab
- Bird: Goshawk
- Fish: Indus river dolphin
- Flower: Gladiolus
- Fruit: Mandarin
- Mammal: Blackbuck
- Tree: Shisham
- State highway mark
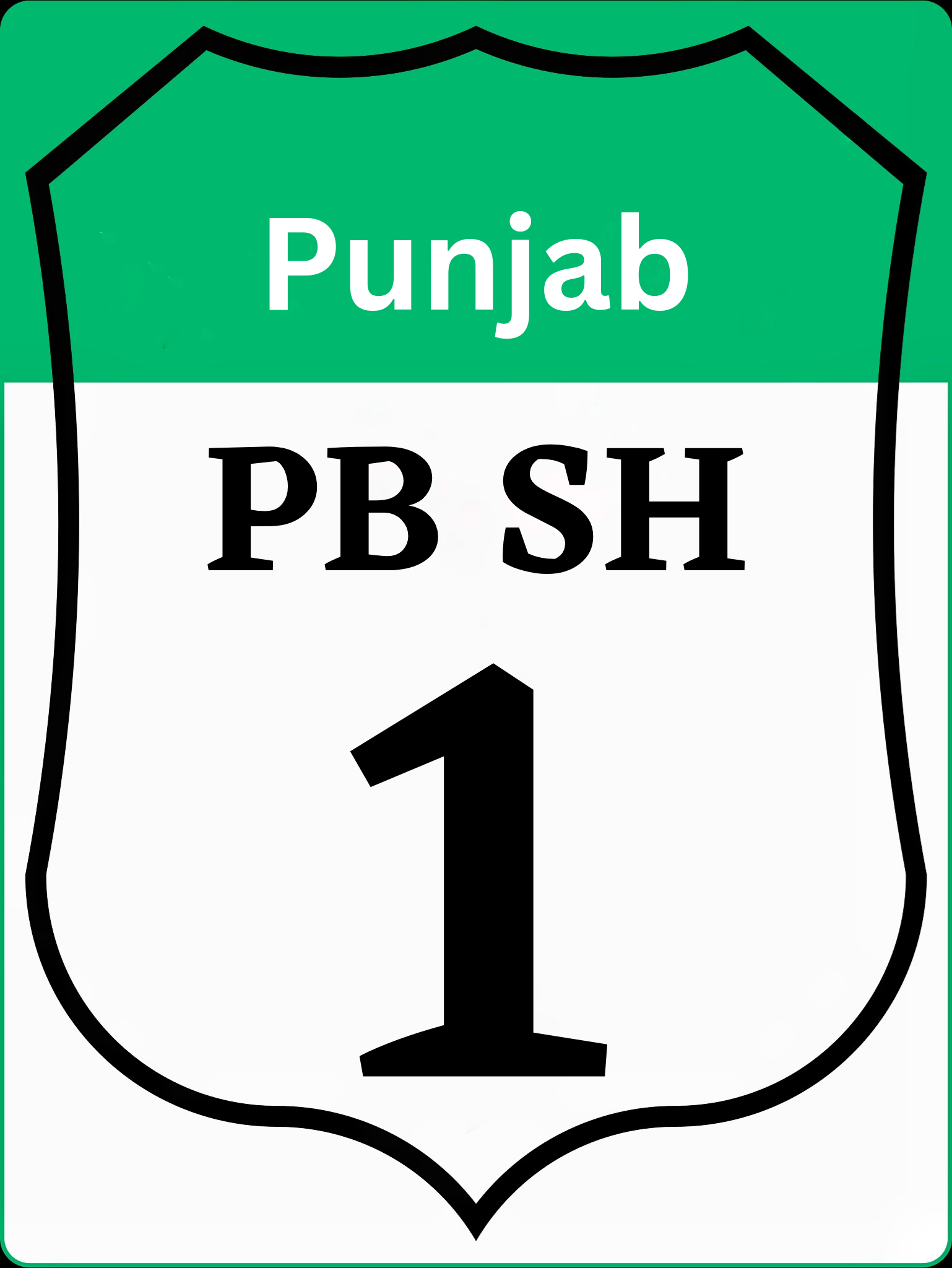
- State highway of Punjab; PB SH1 – PB SH41
- List of Indian state symbols

Punjab (/pʌnˈdʒɑːb/ pun-JAHB; Panjabi: pañjāba, pronounced [pəɲˈd͡ʒaːb]) is a state in northwestern India. Forming part of the larger Punjab region of the Indian subcontinent, the state is bordered by the Indian states and union territories of Himachal Pradesh to the north and northeast, Haryana to the south and southeast, Rajasthan to the southwest, Jammu and Kashmir to the north. To the west, it shares an international border with the identically named Pakistani province of Punjab. Chandigarh serves as a shared capital for Punjab as well as Haryana. The state covers an area of 50,362 square kilometres (19,445 square miles), which is 1.53% of India's total geographical area, making it the 19th-largest Indian state by area out of 28 Indian states (20th largest, if Union Territories are considered). With over 27 million inhabitants, Punjab is the 16th-largest Indian state by population, comprising 23 districts. Punjabi, written in the Gurmukhi script, is the most widely spoken and the official language of the state. The main ethnic group are the Punjabis, with Sikhs (57.7%) and Hindus (38.5%) forming the dominant religious groups. Three of the five traditional Punjab rivers — the Sutlej, Beas, and Ravi — flow through the state.

The history of Punjab has witnessed the migration and settlement of different tribes of people with different cultures and ideas, forming a civilisational melting pot. The ancient Indus Valley Civilisation flourished in the region until its decline around 1900 BCE. Punjab was enriched during the height of the Vedic period, but declined in predominance with the rise of the Mahajanapadas. The region formed the frontier of initial empires during antiquity including Alexander's and the Maurya empires. It was subsequently conquered by the Kushan Empire, Gupta Empire, and then Harsha's Empire. Punjab continued to be settled by nomadic people; including the Huna, Turkic and the Mongols. Punjab came under Muslim rule c. 1000 CE, and was part of the Delhi Sultanate and the Mughal Empire. Sikhism, based on the teachings of Sikh Gurus, emerged between the 15th and 17th centuries. Conflicts between the Mughals and the later Sikh Gurus precipitated a militarisation of the Sikhs, resulting in the formation of a confederacy after the weakening of the Mughal Empire, which competed for control with the larger Durrani Empire. This confederacy was united in 1801 by Maharaja Ranjit Singh, forming the Sikh Empire.

The larger Punjab region was annexed by the British East India Company from the Sikh Empire in 1849. At the time of the independence of India from British rule in 1947, the Punjab province was partitioned along religious lines amidst widespread violence, with the Muslim-majority western portion becoming part of Pakistan and the Hindu- and Sikh-majority east remaining in India, causing a large-scale migration between the two. After the Punjabi Suba movement, Indian Punjab was reorganised on the basis of language in 1966, when its Haryanvi- and Hindi-speaking areas were carved out as Haryana, Pahari-speaking regions attached to Himachal Pradesh and the remaining, mostly Punjabi-speaking areas became the current state of Punjab. A separatist insurgency occurred in the state during the 1980s. At present, the economy of Punjab is the 15th-largest state economy in India with ₹8.02 trillion (equivalent to ₹8.3 trillion or US$88 billion in 2026) in gross domestic product and a per capita GDP of ₹264,000 (equivalent to ₹270,000 or US$2,900 in 2026), ranking 17th among Indian states. Since independence, Punjab is predominantly an agrarian society. It is the ninth-highest ranking among Indian states in human development index. Punjab has bustling tourism, music, culinary, and film industries.

== Etymology ==
The name Punjab is derived from the words Punj ('five') and Aab ('water'), which is taken as meaning "land of five rivers", being references to the Sutlej, Beas, Ravi, Chenab, and Jhelum rivers. However, only the Sutlej, Ravi and Beas rivers flow in the present-day Indian state of Punjab after the 1947 partition. A term used in the Punjabi language for the Indian state is Chardha Punjab while Pakistani Punjab is known as Lehnda Punjab.

== History ==
=== Ancient period ===
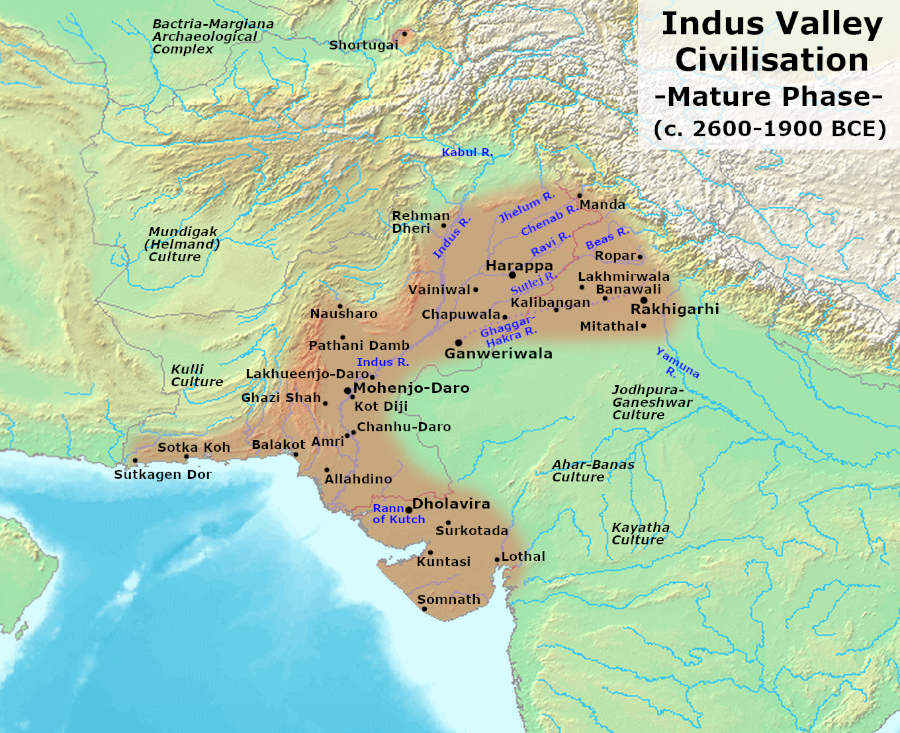
Indus Valley Civilisation 2600-1900 BCE

The Punjab region is noted as the site of one of the earliest urban societies, the Indus Valley Civilisation that flourished from about 3000 B.C. and declined rapidly 1,000 years later, following the Indo-Aryan migrations that overran the region in waves between 1500 and 500 B.C. Frequent intertribal wars stimulated the growth of larger groupings ruled by chieftains and kings, who ruled local kingdoms known as Mahajanapadas. The rise of kingdoms and dynasties in Punjab is chronicled in the ancient Hindu epics, particularly the Mahabharata. The epic battles described in the Mahabharata are chronicled as being fought in what is now the state of Haryana and historic Punjab. The Gandharas, Kambojas, Trigartas, Andhra, Pauravas, Bahlikas (Bactrian settlers of the Punjab), Yaudheyas, and others sided with the Kauravas in the great battle fought at Kurukshetra. According to Dr Fauja Singh and Dr. L. M. Joshi: "There is no doubt that the Kambojas, Daradas, Kaikayas, Andhra, Pauravas, Yaudheyas, Malavas, Saindhavas, and Kurus had jointly contributed to the heroic tradition and composite culture of ancient Punjab." The bulk of the Rigveda was composed in the Punjab region between circa 1500 and 1200 BC, while later Vedic scriptures were composed more eastwards, between the Yamuna and Ganges rivers. The historical Vedic religion constituted the religious ideas and practices in Punjab during the Vedic period (1500–500 BCE), centred primarily in the worship of Indra. (Note: Michaels (2004, p. 38): "The legacy of the Vedic religion in Hinduism is generally overestimated. The influence of the mythology is indeed great, but the religious terminology changed considerably: all the key terms of Hinduism either do not exist in Vedic or have a completely different meaning. The religion of the Veda does not know the ethicised migration of the soul with retribution for acts (karma), the cyclical destruction of the world, or the idea of salvation during one's lifetime (jivanmukti; moksa; nirvana); the idea of the world as illusion (maya) must have gone against the grain of ancient India, and an omnipotent creator god emerges only in the late hymns of the Rigveda. Nor did the Vedic religion know a caste system, the burning of widows, the ban on remarriage, images of gods and temples, Puja worship, Yoga, pilgrimages, vegetarianism, the holiness of cows, the doctrine of stages of life (asrama), or knew them only at their inception. Thus, it is justified to see a turning point between the Vedic religion and Hindu religions." Jamison, Stephanie; Witzel, Michael (1992). "Vedic Hinduism" (PDF). Harvard University. p. 3.: "... to call this period Vedic Hinduism is a contradictio in terminis since Vedic religion is very different from what we generally call Hindu religion – at least as much as Old Hebrew religion is from medieval and modern Christian religion. However, Vedic religion is treatable as a predecessor of Hinduism." See also Halbfass 1991, pp. 1–2)

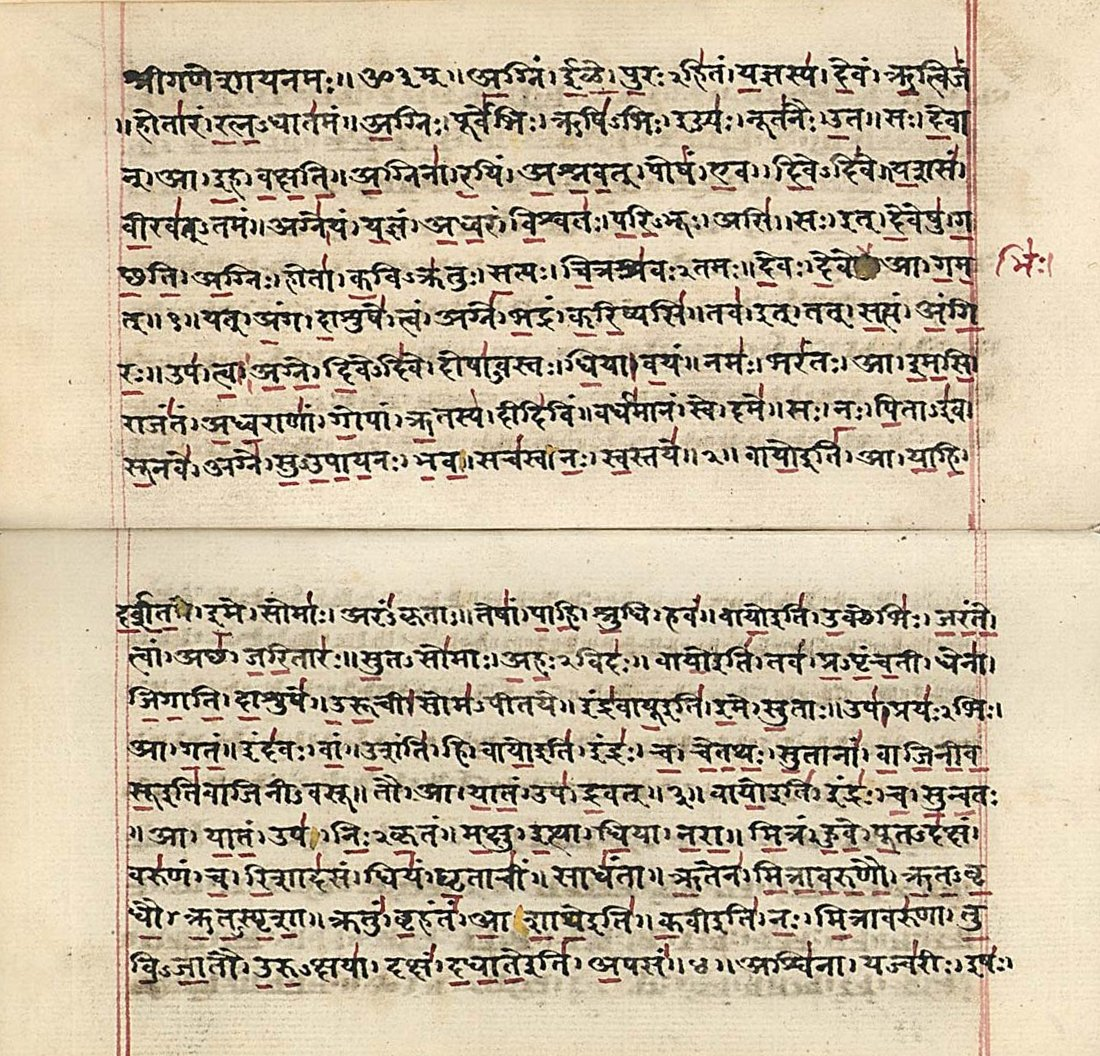
Large parts of Rigveda are believed to have been originated in the Punjab region.

The earliest known notable local king of this region was known as King Porus, who fought the famous Battle of the Hydaspes against Alexander the Great. His kingdom spanned between rivers Hydaspes (Jhelum) and Acesines (Chenab); Strabo had held the territory to contain almost 300 cities. He (alongside Abisares) had a hostile relationship with the Kingdom of Taxila which was ruled by his extended family. When the armies of Alexander crossed Indus in its eastward migration, probably in Udabhandapura, he was greeted by the-then ruler of Taxila, Omphis. Omphis had hoped to force both Porus and Abisares into submission leveraging the might of Alexander's forces and diplomatic missions were mounted, but while Abisares accepted the submission, Porus refused. This led Alexander to seek a face-off with Porus. Thus began the Battle of the Hydaspes in 326 BC; the exact site remains unknown. The battle is thought to have resulted in a decisive Greek victory; however, A. B. Bosworth warns against an uncritical reading of Greek sources who were exaggerative. Alexander later founded two cities—Nicaea at the site of victory and Bucephalous at the battle-ground, in memory of his horse, who died soon after the battle. (Note: Craterus supervised the construction. These cities are yet to be identified.) Later, tetradrachms would be minted depicting Alexander on horseback, armed with a sarissa and attacking a pair of Indians on an elephant. Porus refused to surrender and wandered about atop an elephant, until he was wounded and his force routed. When asked by Alexander how he wished to be treated, Porus replied "Treat me as a king would treat another king". Despite the apparently one-sided results, Alexander was impressed by Porus and chose to not depose him. Not only was his territory reinstated but also expanded with Alexander's forces annexing the territories of Glausaes, who ruled the area northeast of Porus' kingdom.

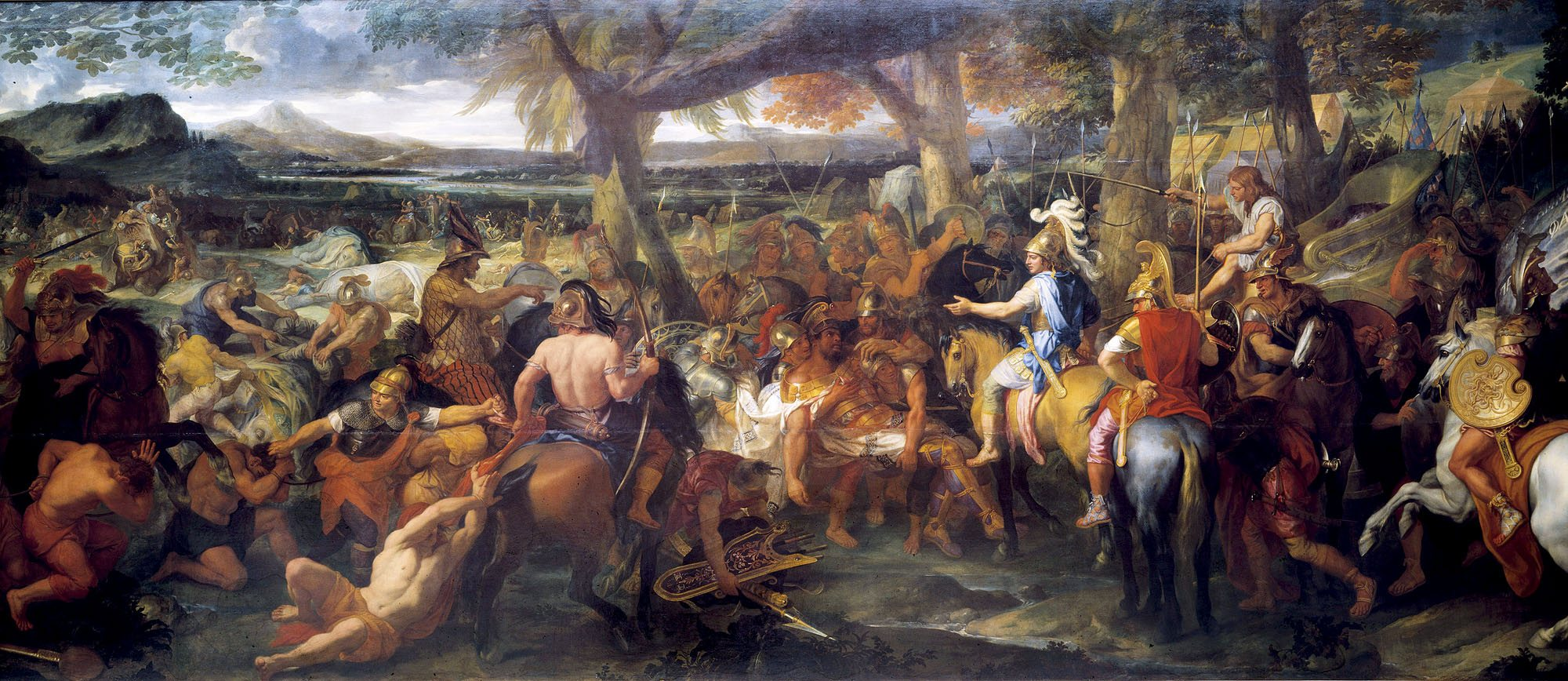
Battle of the Hydaspes (Jhelum)

After Alexander's death in 323 BCE, Perdiccas became the regent of his empire, and after Perdiccas's murder in 321 BCE, Antipater became the new regent. According to Diodorus, Antipater recognised Porus's authority over the territories along the Indus River. However, Eudemus, who had served as Alexander's satrap in the Punjab region, treacherously killed Porus. The battle is historically significant because it resulted in the syncretism of ancient Greek political and cultural influences to the Indian subcontinent, yielding works such as Greco-Buddhist art, which continued to have an impact for the ensuing centuries. The region was then divided between the Maurya Empire and the Greco-Bactrian Kingdom in 302 B.C.E. Menander I Soter conquered Punjab and made Sagala (present-day Sialkot) the capital of the Indo-Greek Kingdom. Menander is noted for having become a patron and convert to Greco-Buddhism and he is widely regarded as the greatest of the Indo-Greek kings. Greek influence in the region ended around 12 B.C.E. when the Punjab fell under the Sasanians.

=== Medieval period ===
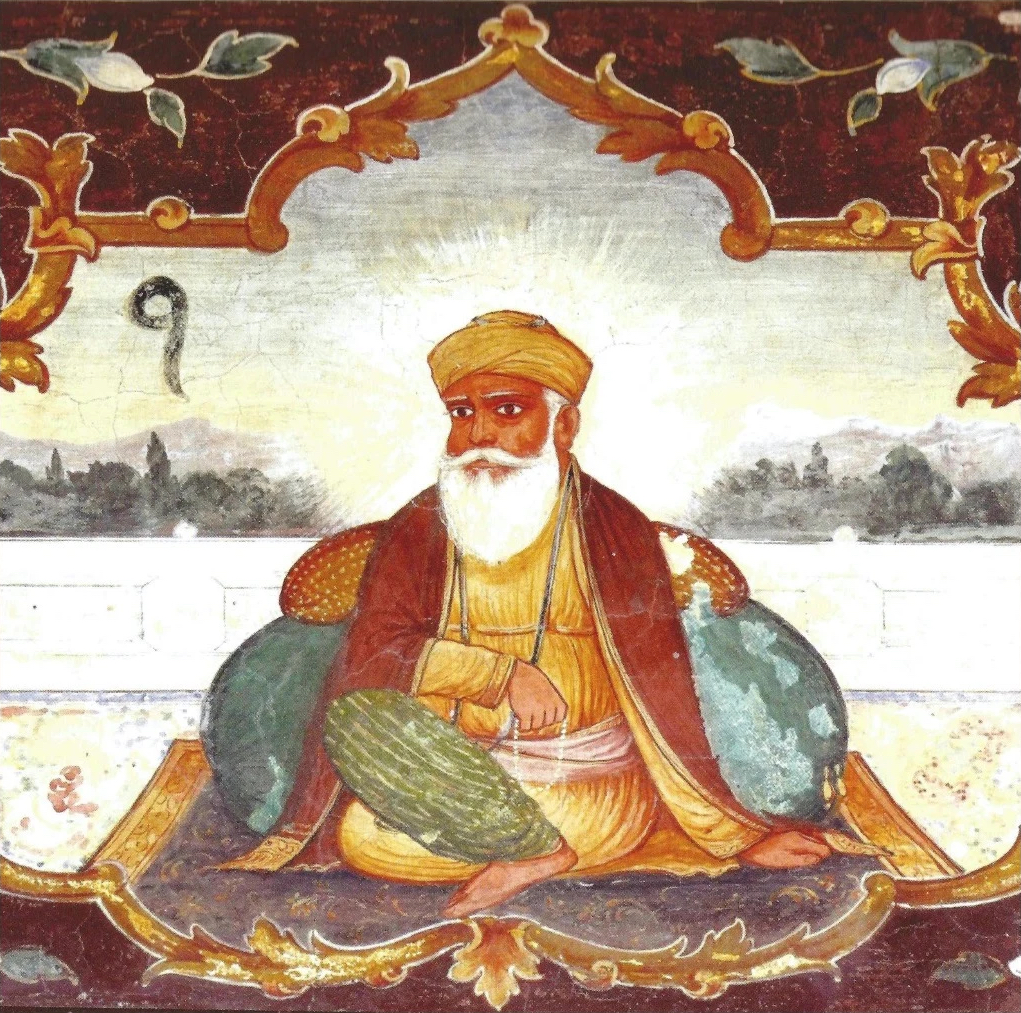
Fresco of Guru Nanak from Baoli Sahib, Goindwal

Following the Muslim conquests in the Indian subcontinent at the beginning of the 8th century, Arab armies of the Umayyad Caliphate penetrated into South Asia introducing Islam into Punjab. In the ninth century, the Hindu Shahi dynasty emerged in the Punjab, ruling much of Punjab and eastern Afghanistan. The Turkic Ghaznavids in the tenth century overthrew the Hindu Shahis and consequently ruled for 157 years, gradually declining as a power until the Ghurid conquest of Lahore by Muhammad of Ghor in 1186, deposing the last Ghaznavid ruler Khusrau Malik. Following the death of Muhammad of Ghor in 1206, the Ghurid state fragmented and was replaced in northern India by the Delhi Sultanate. The Delhi Sultanate ruled the Punjab for the next three hundred years, led by five unrelated dynasties, the Mamluks, Khalajis, Tughlaqs, Sayyids and Lodis. A significant event in the late 15th century Punjab was the formation of Sikhism by Guru Nanak. (Note: "Hinduism, Buddhism, Jainism and Sikh originated in India."Moreno, Luis; Colino, César (2010). Diversity and Unity in Federal Countries. McGill Queen University Press. p. 207. ISBN 978-0-7735-9087-8. Archived from the original on 27 September 2023.) The history of the Sikh faith is closely associated with the history of Punjab and the socio-political situation in the north-west of the Indian subcontinent in the 17th century.

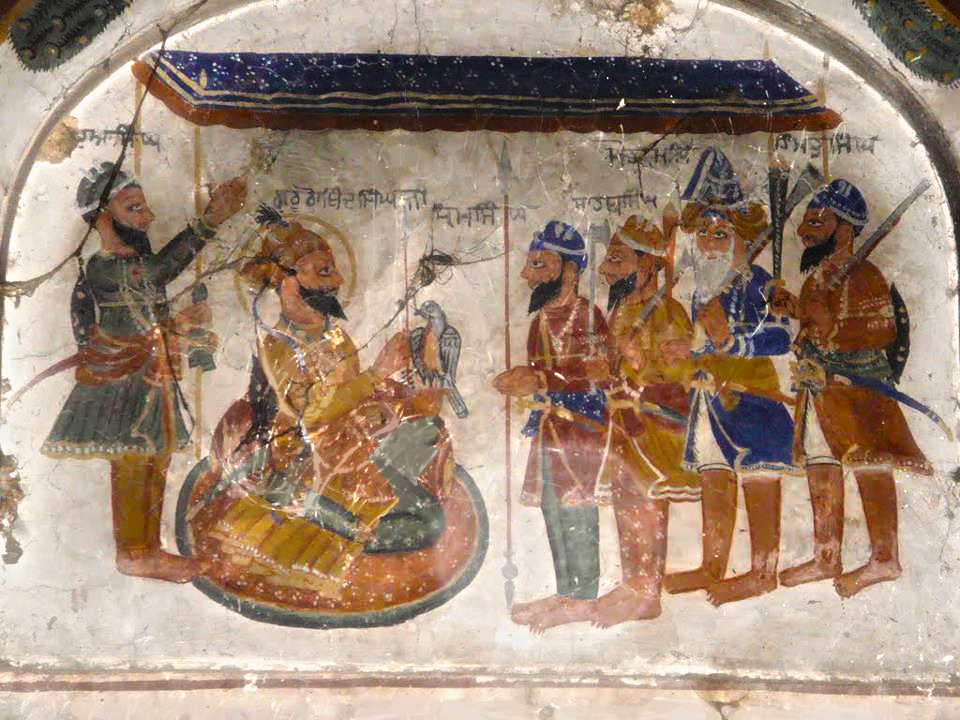
A fresco of Guru Gobind Singh and the Panj Piare.

The hymns composed by Guru Nanak were later collected in the Guru Granth Sahib, the central religious scripture of the Sikhs. The religion developed and evolved in times of religious persecution, gaining converts from both Hinduism and Islam. Mughal rulers of India tortured and executed two of the Sikh gurus—Guru Arjan (1563–1605) and Guru Tegh Bahadur (1621–1675)—after they refused to convert to Islam. The persecution of Sikhs triggered the founding of the Khalsa by Guru Gobind Singh in 1699 as an order to protect the freedom of conscience and religion, with members expressing the qualities of a Sant-Sipāhī ('saint-soldier'). The lifetime of Guru Nanak coincided with the conquest of northern India by Babur and establishment of the Mughal Empire. Jahangir ordered the execution of Guru Arjun Dev, while in Mughal custody, for supporting his son Khusrau Mirza's rival claim to the throne. Guru Arjan Dev's death led to the sixth Guru Guru Hargobind to declare sovereignty in the creation of the Akal Takht and the establishment of a fort to defend Amritsar. Jahangir then jailed Guru Hargobind at Gwalior, but released him after a number of years when he no longer felt threatened. The succeeding son of Jahangir, Shah Jahan, took offence at Guru Hargobind's declaration and after a series of assaults on Amritsar, forced the Sikhs to retreat to the Sivalik Hills. The ninth Guru, Guru Tegh Bahadur, moved the Sikh community to Anandpur and travelled extensively to visit and preach in defiance of Aurangzeb, who attempted to install Ram Rai as new guru.

=== Modern period ===
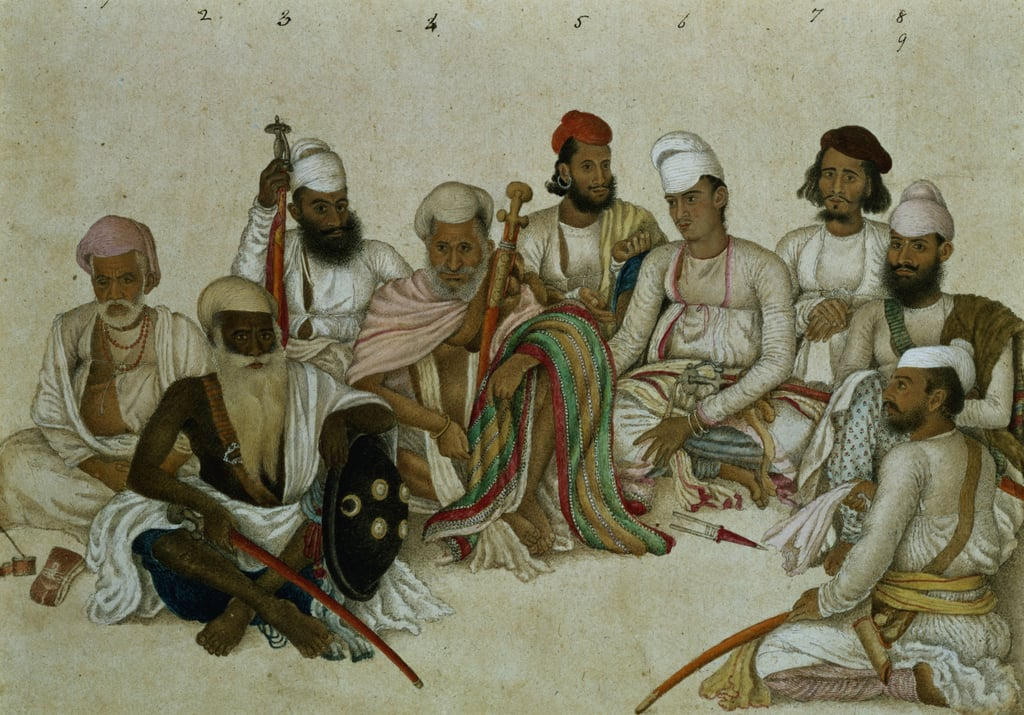
Nine Jat Sikh courtiers and servants of the Raja of Patiala State, ca.1817

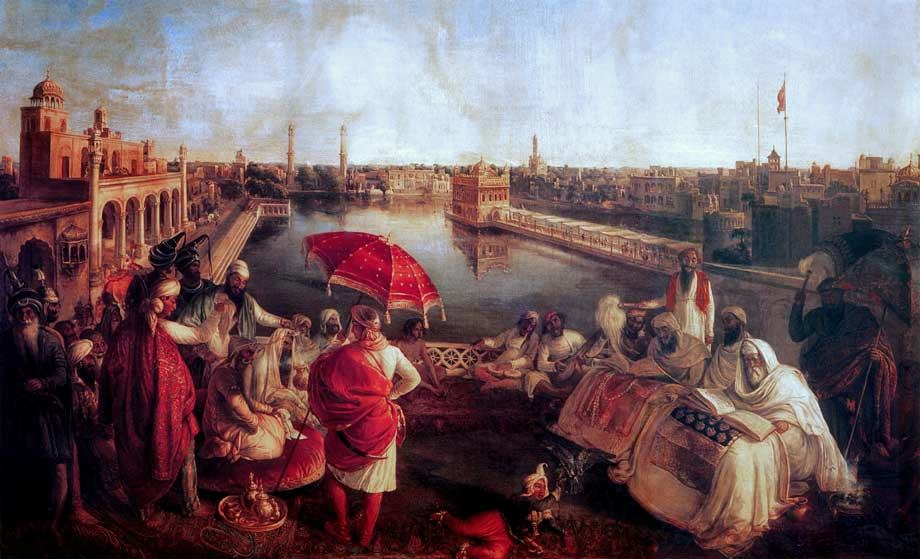
Maharaja Ranjit Singh listening to Guru Granth Sahib being recited near the Akal Takht and Golden Temple, Amritsar. Painting by August Schoefft ca.1850

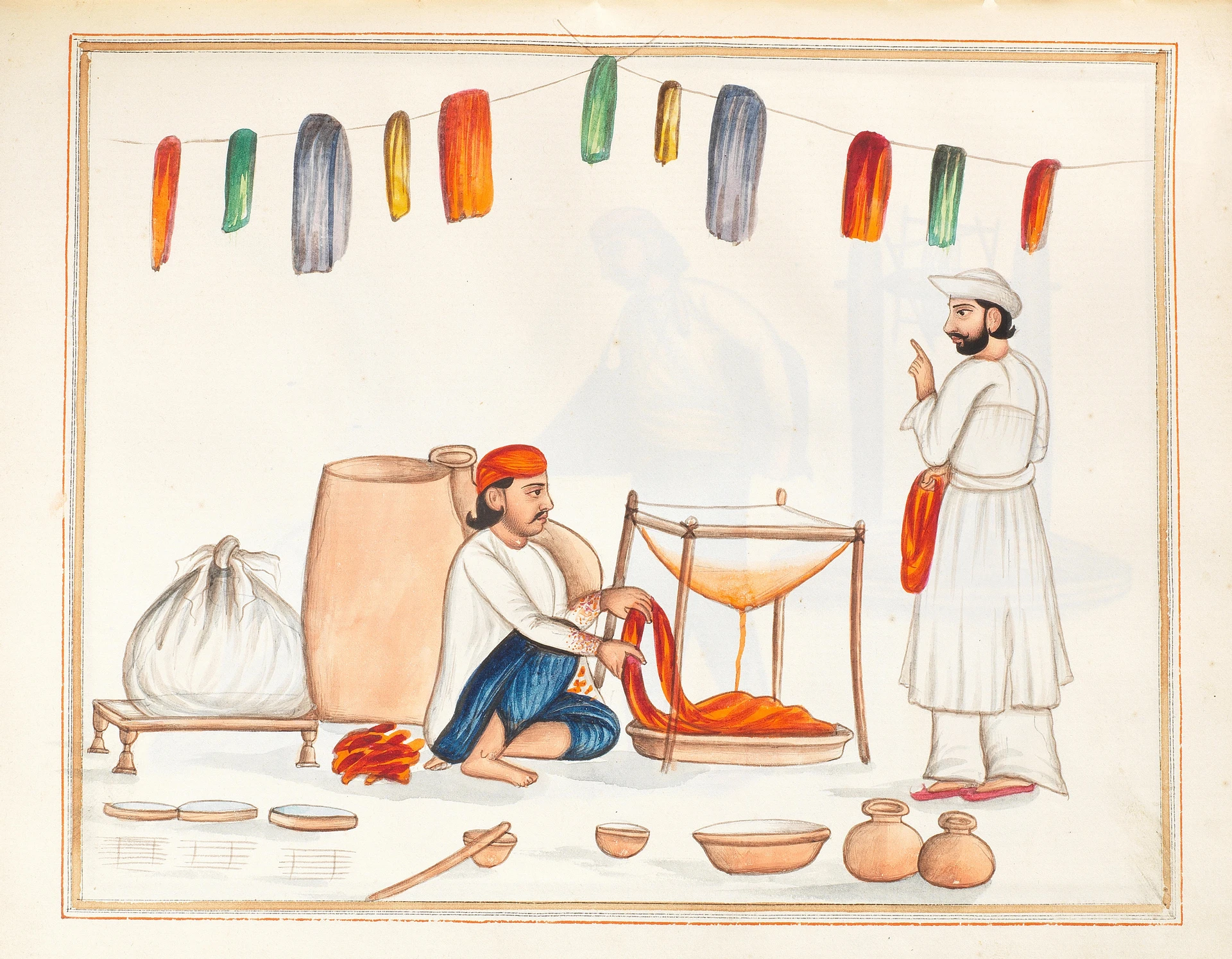
A person dyeing clothes in 19th century Punjab

The Mughals came to power in the early sixteenth century and gradually expanded to control all of the Punjab from their capital at Lahore. As Mughal power weakened, Afghan rulers took control of the region. Contested by Marathas and Afghans, the region was the centre of the growing influence of the Sikhs, who expanded and established the Sikh Empire in 1799 as the Mughals and Afghans weakened. The Cis-Sutlej states were a group of states in modern Punjab and Haryana states lying between the Sutlej River on the north, the Himalayas on the east, the Yamuna River and Delhi District on the south, and Sirsa district on the west. These states were ruled by the Sikh Confederacy. The empire existed from 1799, when Ranjit Singh captured Lahore, to 1849, when it was defeated and conquered in the Second Anglo-Sikh War. It was forged on the foundations of the Khalsa from a collection of autonomous Sikh misls. At its peak in the 19th century, the Empire extended from the Khyber Pass in the west to western Tibet in the east, and from Mithankot in the south to Kashmir in the north. It was divided into four provinces: Lahore, in Punjab, which became the Sikh capital; Multan, also in Punjab; Peshawar; and Kashmir from 1799 to 1849. Religiously diverse, with an estimated population of 3.5 million in 1831 (making it the 19th most populous country at the time), it was the last major region of the Indian subcontinent to be annexed by the British Empire. The Sikh Empire spanned a total of over 200,000 sq mi (520,000 km^{2}) at its zenith.

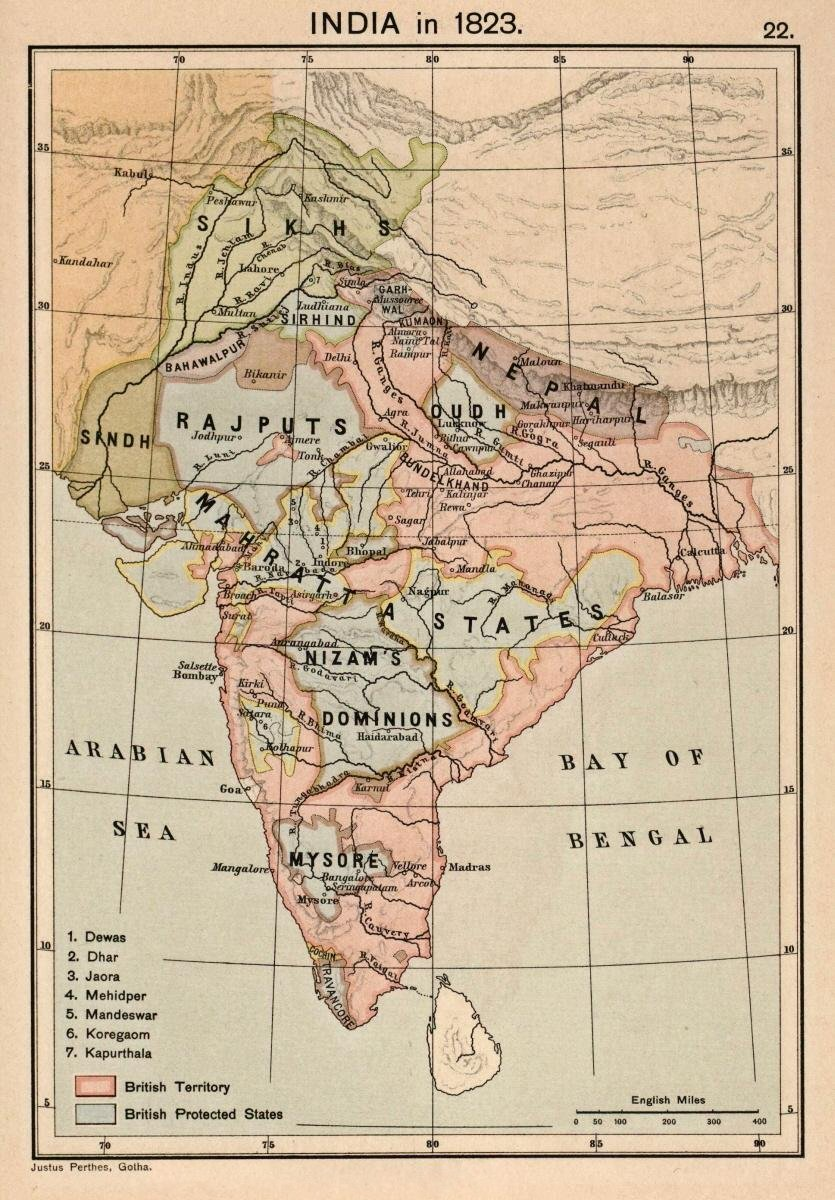
Sikh Empire

After Ranjit Singh's death in 1839, the empire was severely weakened by internal divisions and political mismanagement. This opportunity was used by the East India Company to launch the First and Second Anglo-Sikh Wars. The country was finally annexed and dissolved at the end of the Second Anglo-Sikh War in 1849 into separate princely states and the province of Punjab. Eventually, a Lieutenant Governorship was established in Lahore as a direct representative of the Crown.

==== Colonial era ====
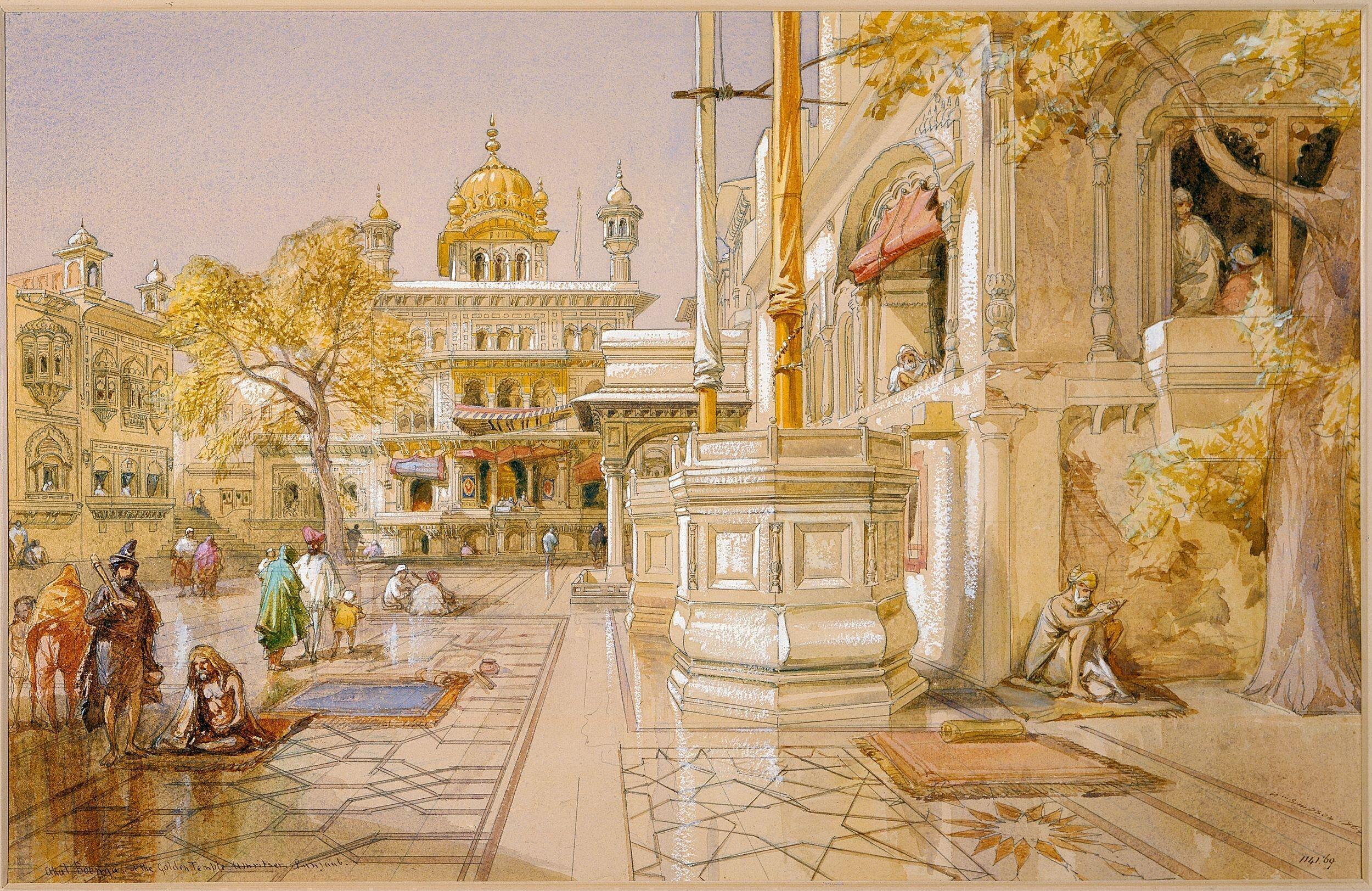
Painting of Sri Akal Takht ca. 1864

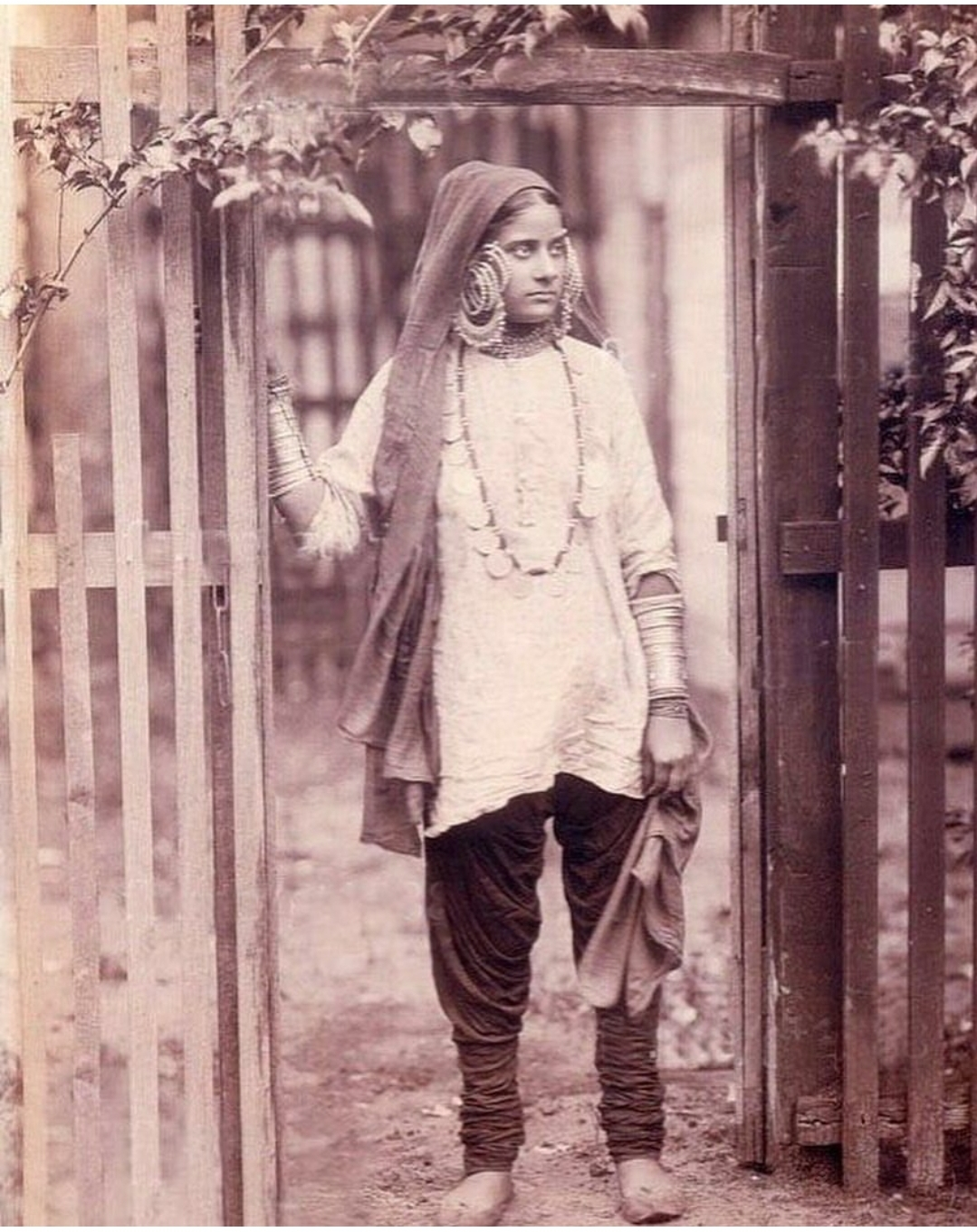
A Sikh woman, Punjab (1870's)

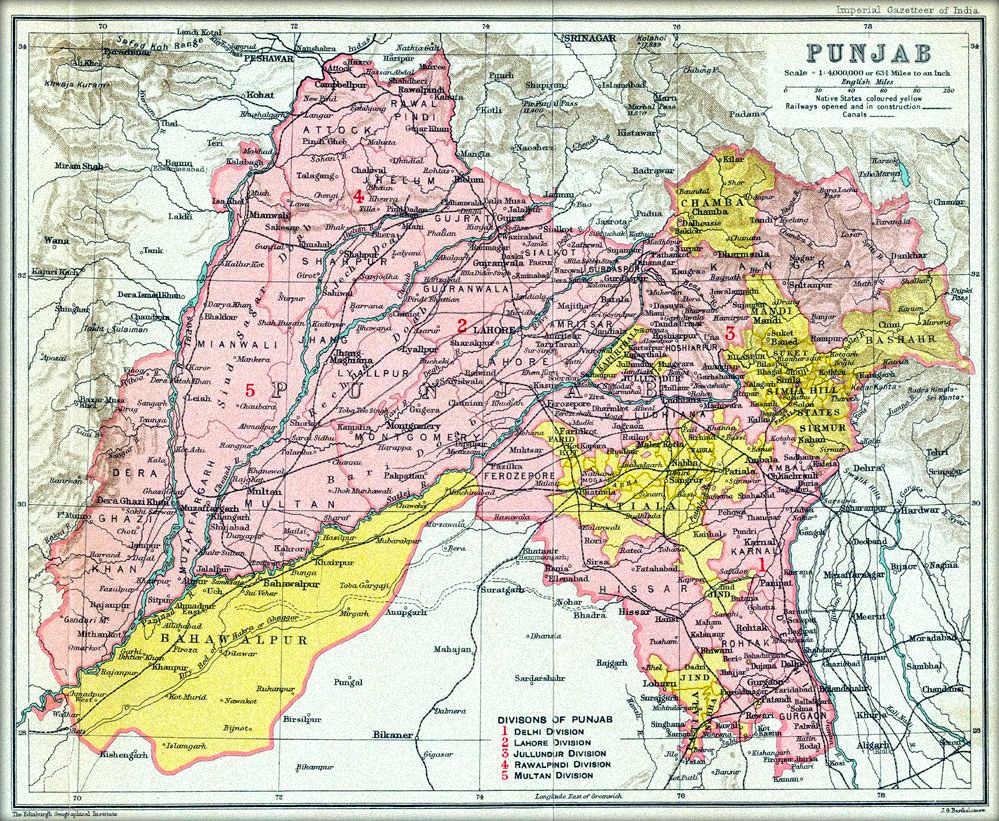
British Punjab Province, before 1947

The Punjab was annexed by the East India Company in 1849. Although nominally part of the Bengal Presidency it was administratively independent. During the Indian Rebellion of 1857, apart from Revolt led by Ahmed Khan Kharal and Murree rebellion of 1857, the Punjab remained relatively peaceful. In 1858, under the terms of the Queen's Proclamation issued by Queen Victoria, the Punjab came under the direct rule of Britain. Colonial rule had a profound impact on all areas of Punjabi life. Economically it transformed the Punjab into the richest farming area of India, socially it sustained the power of large landowners and politically it encouraged cross-communal co-operation among land owning groups. The Punjab also became the major centre of recruitment into the Indian Army. By patronising influential local allies and focusing administrative, economic and constitutional policies on the rural population, the British ensured the loyalty of its large rural population. Administratively, colonial rule instated a system of bureaucracy and measure of the law. The 'paternal' system of the ruling elite was replaced by 'machine rule' with a system of laws, codes, and procedures. For purposes of control, the British established new forms of communication and transportation, including post systems, railways, roads, and telegraphs. The creation of Canal Colonies in western Punjab between 1860 and 1947 brought 14 million acres of land under cultivation, and revolutionised agricultural practices in the region. To the agrarian and commercial class was added a professional middle class that had risen the social ladder through the use of the English education, which opened up new professions in law, government, and medicine. Despite these developments, colonial rule was marked by exploitation of resources. For the purpose of exports, the majority of external trade was controlled by British export banks. The Imperial government exercised control over the finances of Punjab and took the majority of the income for itself.

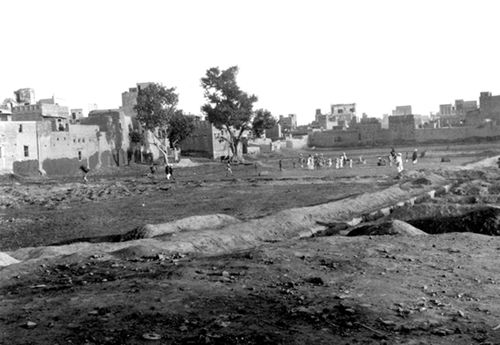
The Jallianwalla Bagh in 1919, months after the massacre.

In 1919, Reginald Dyer ordered his troops to fire on a crowd of demonstrators, mostly Sikhs in Amritsar. The Jallianwala massacre fuelled the Indian independence movement. Nationalists declared the independence of India from Lahore in 1930 but were quickly suppressed. The struggle for Indian independence witnessed competing and conflicting interests in the Punjab. When the Second World War broke out, nationalism in British India had already divided into religious movements. The landed elites of the Muslim, Hindu and Sikh communities had loyally collaborated with the British since annexation, supported the Unionist Party and were hostile to the Congress party led independence movement. Among the peasantry and urban middle classes, the Hindus were the most active National Congress supporters, the Sikhs flocked to the Akali movement while the Muslims eventually supported the Muslim League. Many Sikhs and other minorities supported the Hindus, who promised a secular multicultural and multireligious society. In March 1940, the All-India Muslim League passed the Lahore Resolution, demanding the creation of a separate state from Muslim majority areas in British India. This triggered bitter protests by the Hindus and Sikhs in Punjab, who could not accept living in an Islamic state.

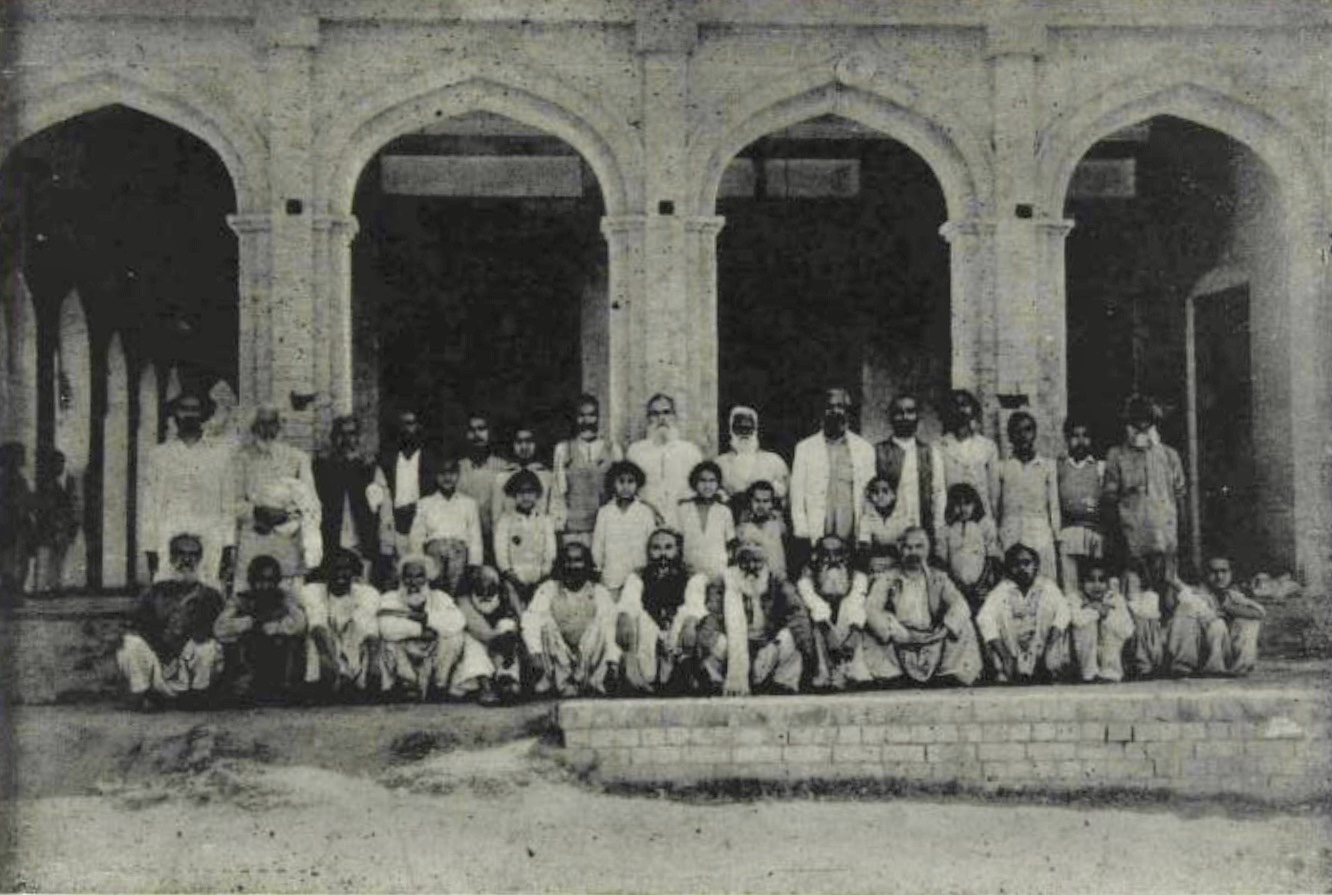
A group of male survivors of the Rawalpindi massacres, who were converted to Islam and subsequently had their kesh (unshorn hair) cut to short length

After the partition of the subcontinent had been decided, special meetings of the Western and Eastern Section of the Legislative Assembly were held on 23 June 1947 to decide whether or not the Province of the Punjab be partitioned. After voting on both sides, partition was decided and the existing Punjab Legislative Assembly was also divided into West Punjab Legislative Assembly and the East Punjab Legislative Assembly. This last Assembly before independence, held its last sitting on 4 July 1947. During this period, the British granted separate independence to India and Pakistan, setting off massive communal violence as Punjabi Muslims fled to Pakistan and Hindu and Sikh Punjabis fled east to India. The Sikhs later demanded a Punjabi-speaking Punjab state with an autonomous Sikh government.

==== Post-colonial era ====
During the colonial era, the various districts and princely states that made up Punjab Province were religiously eclectic, each containing significant populations of Punjabi Muslims, Punjabi Hindus, Punjabi Sikhs, Punjabi Christians, along with other ethnic and religious minorities. However, a major consequence of independence and the partition of Punjab Province in 1947 was the sudden shift towards religious homogeneity occurred in all districts across province and region owing to the new international border that cut through the subdivision.

Territorial evolution of Punjab and neighbouring states and Union territories in India between 1951 and 1966.

The demographic shift was captured when comparing decadal census data taken in 1941 and 1951 respectively, and was primarily due to wide scale migration but also caused by large-scale religious cleansing riots which were witnessed across the region at the time. According to historical demographer Tim Dyson, in the eastern regions of Punjab that ultimately became Indian Punjab following independence, districts that were 66% Hindu in 1941 became 80% Hindu in 1951; those that were 20% Sikh became 50% Sikh in 1951. Conversely, in the western regions of Punjab that ultimately became Pakistani Punjab, all districts became almost exclusively Muslim by 1951. Following independence, several small Punjabi princely states, including Patiala, acceded to the Union of India and were united into the PEPSU. In 1956 this was integrated with the state of East Punjab to create a new, enlarged Indian state called simply "Punjab". Punjab Day is celebrated across the state on 1 November every year marking the formation of a Punjabi language speaking state under the Punjab Reorganisation Act (1966).

In 1966, following Hindu and Sikh Punjabi demands, the Indian government divided Punjab into the state of Punjab and the Hindi majority-speaking states of Haryana and Himachal Pradesh.

During the 1960s, Punjab was known for its prosperity within India, largely due to its fertile lands and industrious inhabitants. However, a significant portion of the Sikh community felt a sense of disparity from the central government of India. The roots of such grievances stretched back several decades, with the primary issue revolving around the distribution of water from the trio of rivers – Ravi, Beas, and Sutlej – that flowed across the Punjabi territory.

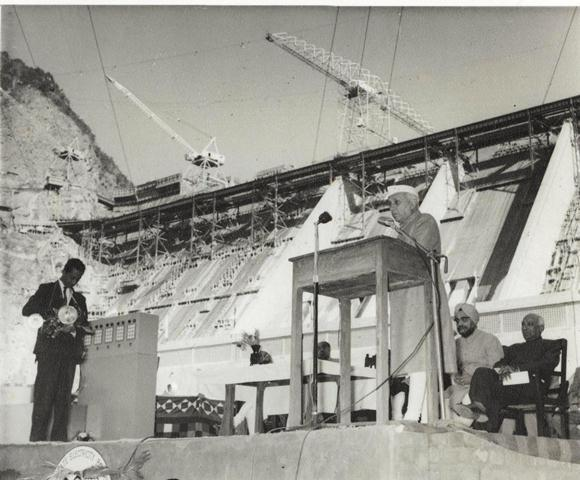
Jawaharlal Nehru at Bhakra Dam

Although Punjab had these waterways running across its lands, it was by law granted only a quarter of the water, precisely 24%, as per the Inter-State Water Disputes Act. The remaining 76% was assigned to Rajasthan and Haryana. To many Punjabis, especially the farming community who heavily depended on these waters for irrigation, this allocation seemed inequitable. The water distribution was a significant contributing factor to the growing sense of disgruntlement against the central government.

The seeds of discontent further sprouted with the advent of the Green Revolution during the 1960s. This initiative sought to boost agricultural output by introducing high-yield seed varieties, and enhancing the use of fertilisers and irrigation. In the midst of this transformative phase, Punjab became known as India's "food basket", contributing considerably to the nation's agricultural production; the financial profits, however, garnered from this agricultural surge were not fairly distributed.

Change in cereal production, yield, land use and population, India

The majority of the gains were hoarded by landowners, who typically owned large plots and were best positioned to exploit the emerging technologies and farming practices. The working class and economically underprivileged segments of society, who often toiled as labourers on these farms, were left with only minor benefits. This uneven distribution of wealth conflicted sharply with Sikh religious customs, which preached economic justice and fair wealth distribution.

Beyond the farming sector, Punjab lacked substantial employment opportunities. An excessive focus on agriculture resulted in the state's industrial sector's neglect, leaving it notably underdeveloped. This skewed concentration on agriculture meant that many economically challenged peasants, without feasible employment alternatives, felt cornered and disgruntled.

Although the Green Revolution was primarily conceived to amplify productivity, it couldn't sustain this increased output over a prolonged period. The introduction of novel crop varieties led to a decline in genetic diversity, thus introducing a new ecological risk. Furthermore, these new crops demanded more water and were highly dependent on chemical fertilisers, both of which had deleterious environmental consequences. Overuse of water led to groundwater resource depletion, and heavy chemical usage adversely affected soil and water systems, further undermining long-term productivity.

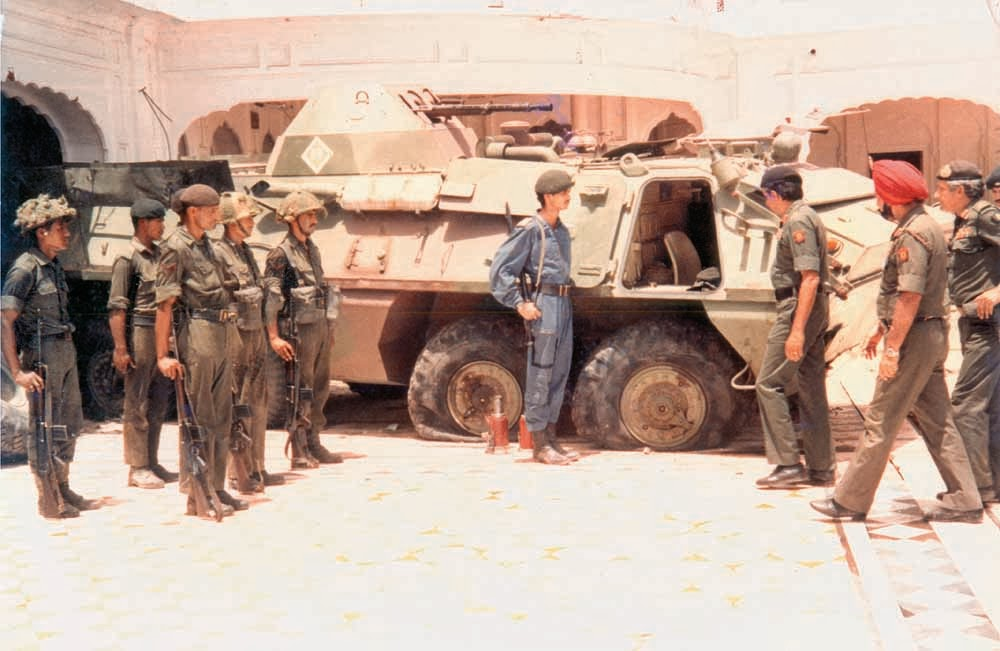
1 Para (SF) during Operation Blue Star

==== Insurgency Era ====
From 1981 to 1995 the state suffered a 14-year-long insurgency. Problems began due to disputes between Punjabi Sikhs and the central government of the Republic of India. Tensions escalated throughout the early 1980s and eventually culminated with Operation Blue Star in 1984; an Indian Army operation aimed at the dissident Sikh community of Punjab. Shortly thereafter, Indian Prime Minister Indira Gandhi was assassinated by two of her Sikh bodyguards. The decade that followed was noted for widespread inter-communal violence and accusations of genocide on the Sikh community by the Indian government. Tens of thousands of youths in Punjab went missing or were killed between 1981–94. The worst affected districts during the insurgency were the border districts of Gurdaspur, Amritsar, and Tarn Taran.

==== 21st century ====
In the early 21st century, Punjab entered a period of relative political and social stability following the decline and end of the insurgency of the 1980s and early 1990s. The state's economy continued to depend heavily on agriculture, while urbanisation, education, manufacturing and the service sector expanded. During the 2000s and 2010s, substance abuse, particularly opioid dependence, emerged as a significant public-health concern; a national survey conducted by the National Drug Dependence Treatment Centre of AIIMS identified Punjab as a state with a high prevalence of opioid use and opioid-use disorders.

At the same time, overseas migration became increasingly prominent, particularly among young people seeking higher education and employment, strengthening Punjab's links with its large diaspora in countries such as Canada, the United Kingdom, the United States, Australia and Italy.

Punjabi culture also underwent substantial transformation. Traditional folk and bhangra music increasingly incorporated pop, hip-hop, electronic and other global influences. The 1990s saw the rise of Punjabi pop artists such as Gurdas Maan, Daler Mehndi and Jazzy B, while the 2000s brought greater international recognition through artists including Panjabi MC. By the 2010s and 2020s, streaming and social-media platforms helped Punjabi music reach audiences worldwide, with Punjabi pop, hip-hop and fusion becoming prominent parts of the global Punjabi music scene.

== Geography ==
Punjab is in northwestern India and has a total area of 50,362 square kilometres (19,445 mi^{2}). Punjab is bordered by Pakistan's Punjab province on the west, Jammu and Kashmir on the north, Himachal Pradesh on the northeast and Haryana and Rajasthan on the south. Most of Punjab lies in a fertile, alluvial plain with perennial rivers and an extensive irrigation canal system. A belt of undulating hills extends along the northeastern part of the state at the foot of the Himalayas. Its average elevation is 300 metres (980 ft) above sea level, with a range from 180 metres (590 ft) in the southwest to more than 500 metres (1,600 ft) around the northeast border. The southwest of the state is semi-arid, eventually merging into the Thar Desert.

Punjab lies in the Indus River Basin. Of the five Punjab rivers, three — Sutlej, Beas and Ravi — flow through the Indian state and empty into the Indus River in Pakistan. The Sutlej and Ravi define parts of the international border with Pakistan.

The soil characteristics are influenced to a limited extent by the topography, vegetation and parent rock. The variation in soil profile characteristics are much more pronounced because of the regional climatic differences. Punjab is divided into three distinct regions on the basis of soil types: southwestern, central, and eastern. Punjab falls under seismic zones II, III, and IV. Zone II is considered a low-damage risk zone; zone III is considered a moderate-damage risk zone; and zone IV is considered a high-damage risk zone.

=== Rivers ===
The major rivers of the Indian state of Punjab are the Sutlej, Beas, and Ravi. All three rivers are tributaries of the Indus River.

The minor rivers and watercourses associated with the Indian state of Punjab include:

- Budki
- Sarsa
- Kali Bein
- Chakki
- Ghaggar
- Kaushalya
- Sarsuti
- Chautang
- Markanda
- Dangri

=== Climate ===
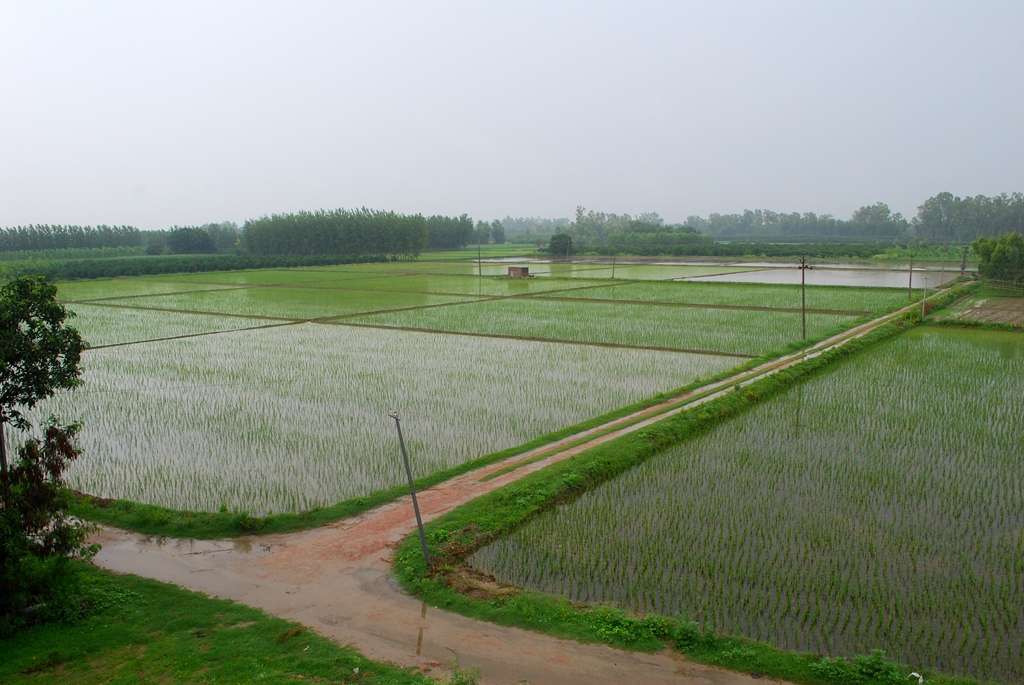
Agricultural fields of Punjab during the monsoon

The geography and subtropical latitudinal location of Punjab lead to large variations in temperature from month to month. Even though only limited regions experience temperatures below 0 °C (32 °F), ground frost is commonly found in the majority of Punjab during the winter season. The temperature rises gradually with high humidity and overcast skies. However, the rise in temperature is steep when the sky is clear and humidity is low.

The maximum temperatures usually occur in mid-May and June. The temperature remains above 40 °C (104 °F) in the entire region during this period. Ludhiana recorded the highest maximum temperature at 46.1 °C (115.0 °F) with Patiala and Amritsar recording 45.5 °C (113.9 °F). The maximum temperature during the summer in Ludhiana remains above 41 °C (106 °F) for a duration of one and a half months. These areas experience the lowest temperatures in January. The sun rays are oblique during these months and the cold winds control the temperature at daytime.

Punjab experiences its minimum temperature from December to February. The lowest temperature was recorded at Amritsar (0.2 °C (32.4 °F)) and Ludhiana stood second with 0.5 °C (32.9 °F). The minimum temperature of the region remains below 5 °C (41 °F) for almost two months during the winter season. The highest minimum temperature of these regions in June is more than the daytime maximum temperatures experienced in January and February. Ludhiana experiences minimum temperatures above 27 °C (81 °F) for more than two months. The annual average temperature in the entire state is approximately 21 °C (70 °F). Further, the mean monthly temperature range varies between 9 °C (48 °F) in July to approximately 18 °C (64 °F) in November.

Amritsar

Climate chart (precipitation, max. and min. temperature)
J	F	M	A	M	J	J	A	S	O	N	D
27 18 4	40 22 7	33 27 11	22 34 17	21 39 22	81 39 25	182 35 26	169 34 25	91 34 23	12 32 16	5.8 27 9	6.8 21 5
- █ Average max. and min. temperatures in °C
- █ Precipitation totals in mm
Imperial conversion
J	F	M	A	M	J	J	A	S	O	N	D
1.1 64 39	1.6 71 44	1.3 81 52	0.9 94 62	0.8 103 71	3.2 102 76	7.1 95 78	6.6 93 78	3.6 93 73	0.5 90 62	0.2 81 49	0.3 70 40
- █ Average max. and min. temperatures in °F
- █ Precipitation totals in inches

Climate data for Amritsar (ATQ) (1991–2020 normals, extremes 1947–present)
Month	Jan	Feb	Mar	Apr	May	Jun	Jul	Aug	Sep	Oct	Nov	Dec	Year
Record high °C (°F)	26.8 (80.2)	32.2 (90.0)	36.2 (97.2)	44.1 (111.4)	48.0 (118.4)	47.8 (118.0)	45.6 (114.1)	40.7 (105.3)	40.6 (105.1)	38.3 (100.9)	34.2 (93.6)	28.5 (83.3)	48.0 (118.4)
Mean maximum °C (°F)	22.7 (72.9)	26.1 (79.0)	32.4 (90.3)	40.6 (105.1)	44.5 (112.1)	44.6 (112.3)	39.8 (103.6)	37.0 (98.6)	36.4 (97.5)	35.3 (95.5)	30.4 (86.7)	25.2 (77.4)	45.6 (114.1)
Mean daily maximum °C (°F)	17.7 (63.9)	21.7 (71.1)	27.0 (80.6)	34.4 (93.9)	39.4 (102.9)	38.9 (102.0)	35.0 (95.0)	34.1 (93.4)	33.9 (93.0)	32.0 (89.6)	27.0 (80.6)	20.9 (69.6)	30.1 (86.2)
Daily mean °C (°F)	11.0 (51.8)	14.4 (57.9)	19.0 (66.2)	25.4 (77.7)	30.7 (87.3)	31.8 (89.2)	30.3 (86.5)	29.7 (85.5)	28.2 (82.8)	24.1 (75.4)	18.1 (64.6)	12.6 (54.7)	22.9 (73.2)
Mean daily minimum °C (°F)	3.8 (38.8)	6.7 (44.1)	11.2 (52.2)	16.6 (61.9)	21.9 (71.4)	24.7 (76.5)	25.7 (78.3)	25.3 (77.5)	22.7 (72.9)	16.4 (61.5)	9.4 (48.9)	4.6 (40.3)	15.7 (60.3)
Mean minimum °C (°F)	−0.3 (31.5)	2.2 (36.0)	6.1 (43.0)	10.9 (51.6)	16.6 (61.9)	19.7 (67.5)	21.8 (71.2)	21.7 (71.1)	18.5 (65.3)	11.8 (53.2)	5.2 (41.4)	0.5 (32.9)	−0.7 (30.7)
Record low °C (°F)	−2.9 (26.8)	−2.6 (27.3)	2.0 (35.6)	6.4 (43.5)	9.6 (49.3)	15.6 (60.1)	18.2 (64.8)	18.8 (65.8)	13.0 (55.4)	7.3 (45.1)	−0.6 (30.9)	−3.6 (25.5)	−3.6 (25.5)
Average rainfall mm (inches)	27.1 (1.07)	39.8 (1.57)	32.6 (1.28)	21.9 (0.86)	20.8 (0.82)	80.9 (3.19)	181.6 (7.15)	168.9 (6.65)	90.7 (3.57)	12.3 (0.48)	5.8 (0.23)	6.8 (0.27)	689.2 (27.13)
Average rainy days	2.1	3.1	2.4	1.9	2.0	4.8	8.1	7.0	3.7	1.0	0.6	0.8	37.4
Average relative humidity (%) (at 17:30 IST)	68	58	50	32	26	40	65	70	64	52	53	63	53
Average dew point °C (°F)	7.0 (44.6)	10.0 (50.0)	13.3 (55.9)	14.0 (57.2)	15.0 (59.0)	19.5 (67.1)	25.0 (77.0)	25.6 (78.1)	23.5 (74.3)	18.3 (64.9)	12.0 (53.6)	8.0 (46.4)	15.9 (60.7)
Mean monthly sunshine hours	181.7	192.7	219.4	265.0	294.7	269.0	215.5	227.7	240.8	253.2	220.1	182.2	2,762
Average ultraviolet index	2	4	6	7	8	9	7	6	5	5	4	2	5
Source 1: India Meteorological Department Time and Date (dewpoints, 2005-2015)
Source 2: NOAA (sun 1971–1990) Tokyo Climate Center (mean temperatures 1991–2020); Weather Atlas

Climate data for Ludhiana Airport (1991–2020 normals, extremes 1868–present)
Month	Jan	Feb	Mar	Apr	May	Jun	Jul	Aug	Sep	Oct	Nov	Dec	Year
Record high °C (°F)	29.2 (84.6)	33.3 (91.9)	41.1 (106.0)	46.1 (115.0)	48.3 (118.9)	47.9 (118.2)	47.8 (118.0)	44.4 (111.9)	41.7 (107.1)	40.0 (104.0)	35.8 (96.4)	29.4 (84.9)	48.3 (118.9)
Mean daily maximum °C (°F)	17.9 (64.2)	21.8 (71.2)	27.3 (81.1)	34.8 (94.6)	39.0 (102.2)	38.0 (100.4)	34.1 (93.4)	33.4 (92.1)	33.1 (91.6)	31.9 (89.4)	27.1 (80.8)	20.9 (69.6)	29.9 (85.8)
Daily mean °C (°F)	12.0 (53.6)	15.3 (59.5)	20.2 (68.4)	26.5 (79.7)	31.3 (88.3)	32.1 (89.8)	30.4 (86.7)	29.7 (85.5)	28.3 (82.9)	24.6 (76.3)	19.2 (66.6)	13.9 (57.0)	23.6 (74.5)
Mean daily minimum °C (°F)	6.1 (43.0)	8.7 (47.7)	13.0 (55.4)	18.2 (64.8)	23.5 (74.3)	26.1 (79.0)	26.6 (79.9)	25.9 (78.6)	23.5 (74.3)	17.3 (63.1)	11.2 (52.2)	6.8 (44.2)	17.2 (63.0)
Record low °C (°F)	−2.2 (28.0)	−1.1 (30.0)	1.4 (34.5)	7.1 (44.8)	11.7 (53.1)	18.0 (64.4)	17.4 (63.3)	18.0 (64.4)	15.2 (59.4)	8.4 (47.1)	0.3 (32.5)	−1.1 (30.0)	−2.2 (28.0)
Average rainfall mm (inches)	28.0 (1.10)	36.2 (1.43)	27.0 (1.06)	17.5 (0.69)	21.2 (0.83)	87.4 (3.44)	217.1 (8.55)	187.2 (7.37)	138.4 (5.45)	18.8 (0.74)	3.9 (0.15)	8.6 (0.34)	791.1 (31.15)
Average rainy days	2.1	2.9	2.1	1.7	1.7	4.9	8.6	8.7	5.5	1.0	0.4	0.9	40.6
Average relative humidity (%) (at 17:30 IST)	66	58	48	27	26	42	67	73	65	50	50	62	53
Average dew point °C (°F)	8 (46)	12 (54)	15 (59)	16 (61)	19 (66)	23 (73)	26 (79)	26 (79)	24 (75)	19 (66)	13 (55)	10 (50)	18 (64)
Average ultraviolet index	4	5	7	8	9	9	8	7	7	6	5	4	7
Source 1: India Meteorological DepartmentTime and Date (dewpoints, 2005-2015)
Source 2: Weather Atlas

==== Seasons ====
Punjab experiences three main seasons. They are:

- Summer (mid-April to the end of June)
- Monsoon (early July to the end of September)
- Winter (early December to the end of February).

Apart from these three, the state experiences transitional seasons like:

- Pre-summer season (March to mid-April): This is the period of transition between winter and summer.
- Post-monsoon season (September to end of November): This is the period of transition between monsoon and winter seasons.

===== Summer =====
Punjab starts experiencing mildly hot temperatures in February. The actual summer season commences in mid-April and the heat continues until the end of August. High temperatures between May and August hover between 40 and 47 °C. The area experiences atmospheric pressure variations during the summer months. The atmospheric pressure of the region remains around 987 millibar during February and it reaches 970 millibar in June.

===== Monsoon =====
Punjab's rainy season begins in the first week of July as monsoon currents generated in the Bay of Bengal bring rain to the region. The monsoon lasts up to mid-September.

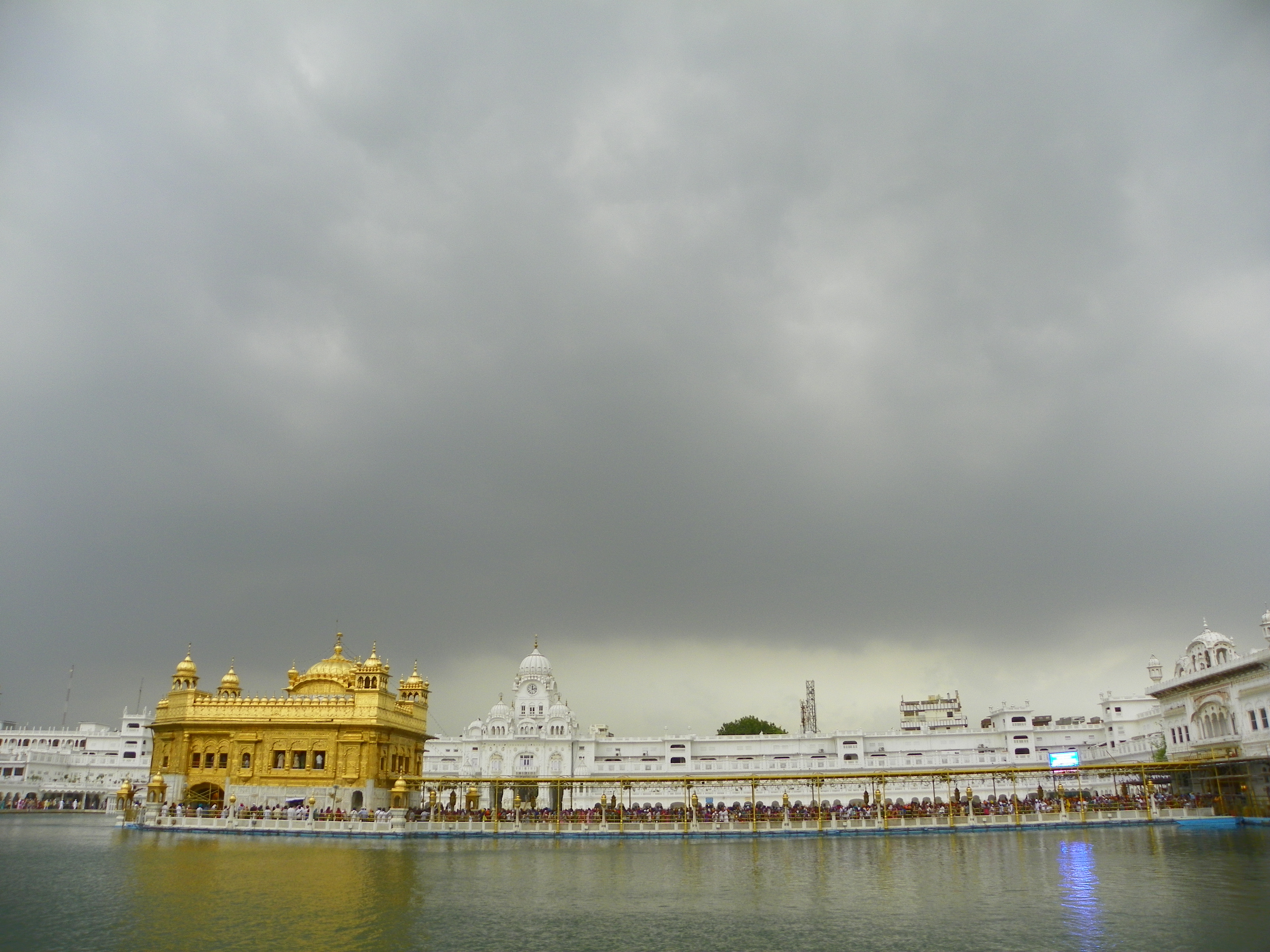
Rainy weather in Amritsar

===== Post-Monsoon transitional season =====
The monsoon begins to reduce by the second week of September. This brings a gradual change in climate and temperature. The time between October and November is the transitional period between monsoon and winter seasons. Weather during this period is generally temperate and dry.

===== Winter =====
Temperature variation is minimal in January. The mean night and day temperatures fall to 5 °C (41 °F) and 12 °C (54 °F), respectively.

===== Post-Winter transitional season =====
The effects of winter diminish by the first week of March. The hot summer season commences in mid-April. This period is marked by occasional showers with hail storms and squalls that cause extensive damage to crops. The winds remain dry and warm during the last week of March, commencing the harvest period.

==== Rainfall ====
- Monsoon Rainfall

Monsoon season provides most of the rainfall for the region. Punjab receives rainfall from the monsoon current of the Bay of Bengal. This monsoon current enters the state from the southeast in the first week of July.

- Winter Rainfall

The winter season remains very cool with temperatures falling below freezing at some places. Winter also brings in some western disturbances. Rainfall in the winter provides relief to the farmers as some of the winter crops in the region of Shivalik Hills are entirely dependent on this rainfall. As per meteorological statistics, the sub-Shivalik area receives more than 100 millimetres (3.9 in) of rainfall in the winter months.

According to the World Air Quality Report 2024, Mullanpur (Punjab) is one of the world's 20 most polluted city in India.

=== Wildlife ===
Cattle Egret near Rohti Chhana, Patiala

The fauna of the area is rich, with 396 types of birds, 214 kinds of Lepidoptera, 55 varieties of fish, 20 types of reptiles, and 19 kinds of mammals. The state of Punjab has large wetland areas, bird sanctuaries that house numerous species of birds, and many zoological parks. Wetlands include the national wetland Hari-Ke-Pattan, the wetland of Kanjli, and the wetlands of Kapurthala Sutlej. Wildlife sanctuaries include the Harike in the district of Tarn Taran Sahib, the Zoological Park in Rupnagar, Chhatbir Bansar Garden in Sangrur, Aam Khas Bagh in Sirhind, Amritsar's famous Ram Bagh Palace, Shalimar Garden in Kapurthala, and the famous Baradari Garden in the city of Patiala.

==== Flora ====
Seedpods on Vachellia nilotica, Jhunir

Punjab has the lowest forest cover as a percentage of land area of any Indian state, with 3.6% of its total area under forest cover as of 2017. During the Green Revolution, large tracts of jungles were cut-down in the state to make room for agriculture and forested areas were also cleared for road infrastructure and residential homes. Various NGOs are working towards afforestation and reforestation of the state by launching educational drives, planting saplings, working towards regulatory changes, and pressuring organisations to follow environmental laws. One NGO, EcoSikh, has planted over 100 forests, composed of native plant species, in the state using the Japanese Miyawaki methodology that are named 'Guru Nanak Sacred Forests'. Native plant species are facing the risk of extirpation from the state but planting mini-forests throughout the land can help prevent this from occurring. Prior to the Green Revolution, Butea monosperma (known as 'dhak' in Punjabi) trees were found in abundance in the state.

==== Fauna ====
Asia's Largest Open Sanctuary at Abohar, Punjab

A few of the rivers in Punjab have crocodiles, including reintroduced gharials in the Beas River after half a century of their extirpation from the state. Indus river dolphins can be found in the Harike Wetland. The extraction of silk from silkworms is another industry that flourishes in the state. Production of bee honey is done in some parts of Punjab. The southern plains are desert land; hence, camels can be seen. Buffaloes graze around the banks of rivers. The northeastern part is home to animals like horses. Wildlife sanctuaries have many more species of wild animals like the otter, wild boar, wildcat, fruit bat, hog deer, flying fox, squirrel, and mongoose. Naturally formed forests can be seen in the Shivalik ranges in the districts of Ropar, Gurdaspur and Hoshiarpur. Patiala is home to the Bir forest while the wetlands area in Punjab is home to the Mand forest. The local subspecies of blackbuck, A. c. rajputanae, is facing the risk of extirpation from the state.

Botanical gardens exist throughout Punjab. There is a zoological park and a tiger safari park, as well as three parks dedicated to deer.

The state bird is the northern goshawk (baz) (Accipiter gentilis), the state animal is the blackbuck (Antilope cervicapra), the state aquatic animal is Indus river dolphin (Platanista minor), and the state tree is the shisham (Dalbergia sissoo).

== Demographics ==
Population Growth
Year	Pop.	±%
1881	6,607,699	—
1891	7,497,685	+13.5%
1901	7,679,645	+2.4%
1911	6,830,507	−11.1%
1921	7,262,881	+6.3%
1931	8,123,076	+11.8%
1941	9,757,161	+20.1%
1951	9,160,500	−6.1%
1961	11,135,069	+21.6%
1971	13,551,060	+21.7%
1981	16,788,915	+23.9%
1991	20,281,969	+20.8%
2001	24,358,999	+20.1%
2011	27,743,338	+13.9%
Source: Census of India (Note: 1881 figure taken from census data by combining the total population of all districts (Jalandhar, Ludhiana, Firozpur, Amritsar, Hoshiarpur, and Gurdaspur (minus Shakargarh Tehsil)), and princely states (Kapurthala, Malerkotla, Faridkot, Patiala, and Nabha) which are in the region that constitutes the contemporary state of Punjab, India. See 1881 census data here:) (Note: 1891 figure taken from census data by combining the total population of all districts (Jalandhar, Ludhiana, Firozpur, Amritsar, Hoshiarpur, and Gurdaspur (minus Shakargarh Tehsil)), and princely states (Kapurthala, Malerkotla, Faridkot, Patiala, and Nabha) which are in the region that constitutes the contemporary state of Punjab, India. See 1891 census data here:) (Note: 1901 figure taken from census data by combining the total population of all districts (Jalandhar, Ludhiana, Firozpur, Amritsar, Hoshiarpur, and Gurdaspur (minus Shakargarh Tehsil)), and princely states (Kapurthala, Malerkotla, Faridkot, Patiala, and Nabha) which are in the region that constitutes the contemporary state of Punjab, India. See 1901 census data here:) (Note: 1911 figure taken from census data by combining the total population of all districts (Jalandhar, Ludhiana, Firozpur, Amritsar, Hoshiarpur, and Gurdaspur (minus Shakargarh Tehsil)), and princely states (Kapurthala, Malerkotla, Faridkot, Patiala, and Nabha) which are in the region that constitutes the contemporary state of Punjab, India. See 1911 census data here:) (Note: 1921 figure taken from census data by combining the total population of all districts (Jalandhar, Ludhiana, Firozpur, Amritsar, Hoshiarpur, and Gurdaspur (minus Shakargarh Tehsil)), and princely states (Kapurthala, Malerkotla, Faridkot, Patiala, and Nabha) which are in the region that constitutes the contemporary state of Punjab, India. See 1921 census data here:) (Note: 1931 figure taken from census data by combining the total population of all districts (Jalandhar, Ludhiana, Firozpur, Amritsar, Hoshiarpur, and Gurdaspur (minus Shakargarh Tehsil)), and princely states (Kapurthala, Malerkotla, Faridkot, Patiala, and Nabha) which are in the region that constitutes the contemporary state of Punjab, India. See 1931 census data here:) (Note: 1941 figure taken from census data by combining the total population of all districts (Jalandhar, Ludhiana, Firozpur, Amritsar, Hoshiarpur, and Gurdaspur (minus Shakargarh Tehsil)), and princely states (Kapurthala, Malerkotla, Faridkot, Patiala, and Nabha) which are in the region that constitutes the contemporary state of Punjab, India. See 1941 census data here:)

Punjab is home to 2.3% of India's population, with a density of 551 persons per km^{2}. According to the provisional results of the 2011 national census, Punjab has a population of 27,743,338, making it the 16th-most populous state in India. Males and females totalled 14,639,465 and 13,103,873, respectively. Dalits comprised 32% of Punjab's population in 2017. In the state, the rate of population growth is 13.9% (2011), lower than national average. According to the National Family Health Survey 2019–21, the total fertility rate of Punjab was 1.6 children per woman.

Out of the total population, 37.5% live in urban regions. The total population living in urban areas is 10,399,146, of which 5,545,989 are males, and 4,853,157 are females. The urban population has increased by 37.5% over the last 10 years.

Numbers of rural and urban population in Punjab
Year	Rural (in millions)	Urban (in millions)	Total (in millions)	Rural %	Urban %
2011	17.32	10.3	27.70	62.51%	37.49%
2001	16.10	8.26	24.36	66.08%	33.92%
1991	14.29	5.99	20.28	70.45%	29.55%
1981	12.14	4.65	16.79	72.32%	27.68%
1971	10.33	3.22	13.55	76.27%	23.73%

=== Urbanisation ===
Around 37.49% of the population is urban while 62.51% is rural. Out of a total population of 277.04 lakhs, the rural population is 173.4 lakhs. The capital city of the state is Amritsar and largest city of the state is Ludhiana. Out of total population of Punjab, 37.48% people live in urban regions. The absolute urban population living in urban areas is 10,399,146 of which 5,545,989 are males and while remaining 4,853,157 are females. The urban population in the last 10 years has increased by 37.48%. The major cities are Ludhiana, Amritsar, Jalandhar, Mohali, Patiala and Bathinda.

=== Gender ===
There has been a constant decline in the sex ratio of the state. In 2011, the sex ratio in Punjab was 895 females per 1000 males, which was below the national average of 940. In June 2023, the state government under Aam Aadmi Party announced that all women, upon the birth of a second girl, would receive 6000 rupees.

See detailed district wise table – Demographics of Punjab, India § Gender

=== Literacy ===
The literacy rate was 75.84% in the 2011 population census, slightly higher than the national average of 74.04%. Of that, male literacy stood at 80.4% while female literacy was at 70.7%. In absolute numbers, the total number of literates in Punjab stood at 18,707,137, of which males were 10,436,056 and females were 8,271,081. The median number of years of schooling completed in the state was 6.5 for females and 7.8 for males in 2011.

See detailed district & religion wise table - Demographics of Punjab, India § Literacy rate

=== Language ===
Languages spoken by district Punjabi 60–70% 70–80% 80–90% 90–100%

Languages of Punjab, India
(First Language) (2011)
1. Punjabi (89.8%)
2. Hindi (7.85%)
3. Bagri (0.84%)
4. Others (1.48%)

Punjabi is the native and sole official language of Punjab and, as of the 2011 census, was spoken as a first language by 24.9 million people, or roughly 90% of the state's population. Hindi is spoken by 2.18 million, or 7.9% of the population, Bagri has 234,000 speakers (or 0.8%), while the remaining 413,000 (or 1.5%) spoke other languages.

=== Caste ===
Castes of Punjab (2011)
1. Scheduled Castes (31.9%)
2. Upper Castes (UC) (30.0%)
3. Other Backward Classes (OBC or BC) (31.3%)
4. Religious minorities (3.80%)
5. Rai Sikhs (3.00%)

The 2011 Census of India found that Scheduled Castes accounted for 31.9% of the state's population. The Other Backward Classes formed 31.3% of the population in Punjab. The exact population of Forward castes is not known as their data from the Socio Economic and Caste Census 2011 was not public as of 2019.

According to the 2011 census, 73.33% of scheduled caste (SC) people reside in rural areas and 26.67% in urban areas of Punjab. Punjab accounts for 4.3% of the country's SC population, despite having only 2.3% of the total population. The SC population growth rate between 2001 and 2011 was 26.06%, compared to 13.89% for the state as a whole. The literacy rate among SCs was 64.81%, compared to 75.84% for the state as a whole.

As per National Family Health Survey (NFHS-4, 2015–16), the infant mortality rate was 40 per 1000 live births before the age of one year for scheduled castes, compared to 29 per 1000 births for the state as a whole. The infant mortality rate for Other Backward Castes (OBC) was 21 per 1000 live births and 22 per 1000 for those who are not from the SC and OBC classes. Although the prevalence of anaemia (low levels of haemoglobin in the blood) has been found quite high among all population groups in Punjab, it was still higher among the SC population than other groups. For the women between the ages of 15 and 49 years, the prevalence of anaemia among SC women was 56.9%, compared to 53.5% for the state as a whole. Among the children between the ages of 6 and 59 months, the rate of anaemia for SC children was 60%, compared to 56.9% for the state as a whole.

Below is a list of districts by the percentage of their SC population, according to the 2011 census.

Scheduled Caste population by district (2011)
No.	District	Percentage	No.	District	Percentage	No.	District	Percentage
1	SBS Nagar	42.51%	8	Hoshiarpur	35.14%	16	Pathankot	30.60%
2	Muktsar	42.31%	9	Kapurthala	33.94%	17	Sangrur	27.89%
3	Fazilka	42.27%	10	Tarn Taran	33.71%	18	Ludhiana	26.39%
4	Firozpur	42.07%	11	Mansa	33.63%	19	Rupnagar	25.42%
5	Jalandhar	38.95%	12	Bathinda	32.44%	20	Patiala	24.55%
6	Faridkot	38.92%	13	Barnala	32.24%	21	Gurdaspur	23.03%
7	Moga	36.50%	14	Fatehgarh Sahib	32.07%	22	SAS Nagar	21.74%
			15	Amritsar	30.95%			

=== Religion ===
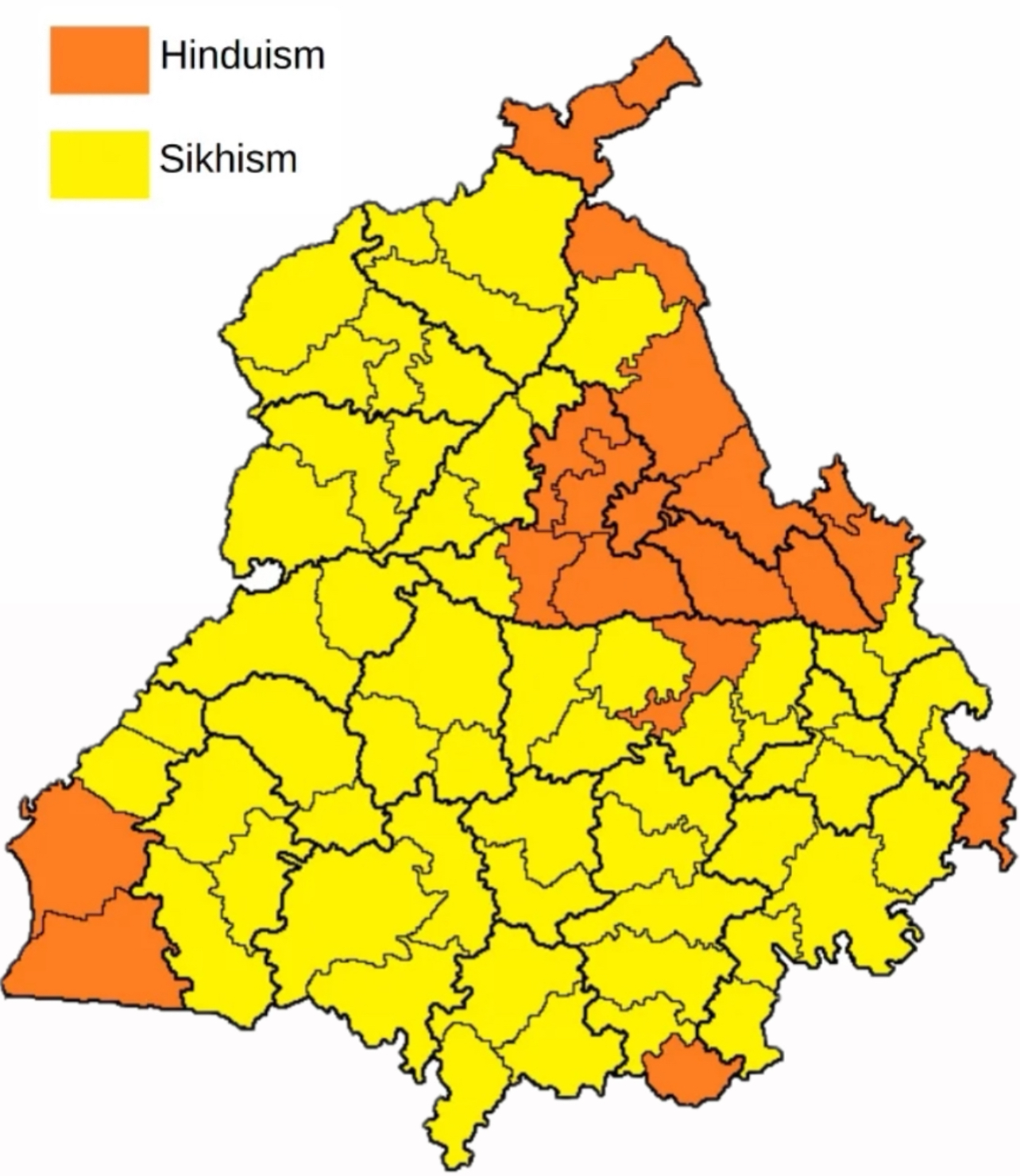
Largest Religious Affiliation By Tehsil in Punjab, 2011 Census

Punjab has the largest population of Sikhs in India and is the only state where Sikhs form a majority, numbering around 16 million (57.7% of the state population). Hinduism is the second-largest religion in the Indian state of Punjab, with about 10.68 million followers (38.5% of the state's population), including a majority in the Doaba region. Islam is followed by 535,489 people, making up 1.9% of the population, primarily concentrated in Malerkotla, Qadian and Ludhiana. Other smaller religious groups in Punjab include Christianity practised by 1.3%, Jainism by 0.2%, Buddhism by 0.1%, and others accounting for 0.3%. Sikhs form the majority in 17 out of the 23 districts, while Hindus are the majority in five districts: Pathankot, Jalandhar, Hoshiarpur, Fazilka, and Shaheed Bhagat Singh Nagar.

Religion in Punjab, India (1881–2011)
Religious group	1881		1891		1901		1911		1921		1931		1941		2001		2011	
Religious group	Pop.	%	Pop.	%	Pop.	%	Pop.	%	Pop.	%	Pop.	%	Pop.	%	Pop.	%	Pop.	%
Hinduism (Note: 1931–1941 census: Including Ad-Dharmis)	2,839,995	42.98%	3,345,813	44.62%	3,278,620	42.69%	2,383,954	34.9%	2,462,215	33.9%	2,351,417	28.95%	2,597,038	26.62%	8,997,942	36.94%	10,678,138	38.49%
Islam	2,440,888	36.94%	2,800,928	37.36%	2,898,114	37.74%	2,515,774	36.83%	2,686,598	36.99%	3,072,619	37.83%	3,748,410	38.42%	382,045	1.57%	535,489	1.93%
Sikhism	1,311,139	19.84%	1,332,177	17.77%	1,479,072	19.26%	1,883,572	27.58%	2,043,520	28.14%	2,610,810	32.14%	3,281,341	33.63%	14,592,387	59.91%	16,004,754	57.69%
Jainism	10,463	0.16%	11,591	0.15%	12,306	0.16%	11,951	0.17%	11,030	0.15%	12,262	0.15%	12,480	0.13%	39,276	0.16%	45,040	0.16%
Christianity	5,160	0.08%	7,092	0.09%	11,415	0.15%	35,125	0.51%	59,363	0.82%	75,809	0.93%	103,477	1.06%	292,800	1.2%	348,230	1.26%
Zoroastrianism	22	0.0003%	80	0.001%	108	0.001%	131	0.002%	138	0.002%	145	0.002%	90	0.001%	—N/a	—N/a	—N/a	—N/a
Buddhism	1	0%	0	0%	3	0%	0	0%	17	0.0002%	10	0.0001%	4	0%	41,487	0.17%	33,237	0.12%
Judaism	—N/a	—N/a	0	0%	6	0.0001%	0	0%	0	0%	4	0%	25	0.0003%	—N/a	—N/a	—N/a	—N/a
Others (Note: Tribals, others, or not stated.)	31	0.0005%	4	0.0001%	1	0%	0	0%	0	0%	0	0%	14,296	0.15%	8,594	0.04%	98,450	0.35%
Total Population	6,607,699	100%	7,497,685	100%	7,679,645	100%	6,830,507	100%	7,262,881	100%	8,123,076	100%	9,757,161	100%	24,358,999	100%	27,743,338	100%
Note: Colonial era census figures include small portions of contemporary Haryana, Himachal Pradesh and Punjab, Pakistan due to changes to administrative division borders during the post-independence era.: 1. Ropar tehsil, 282 Village with Kharar, kurali town of Kharar, Tahsil of Ambala District given to punjab in Punjab Reorganisation Act, 1966 which not included here.; 2. Nabha, Patiala State, fully included in Punjab, its some area also falls into Haryana (Mahendragarth, Narwana, Pinjore, Bawal) & Himachal (Kandaghat), which also added here, and Jind State some area also falls in Punjab (Sangrur etc.) which is not added here.; 3. 186 villages with Patti, Punjab & Khemkaran town of Kasur tahsil of Lahore District also fall in India which not included here.

Religion in Punjab, India (2011)
1. Sikhism (57.7%)
2. Hinduism (38.5%)
3. Islam (1.93%)
4. Christianity (1.26%)
5. Jainism (0.16%)
6. Buddhism (0.12%)
7. Others/not stated (0.35%)

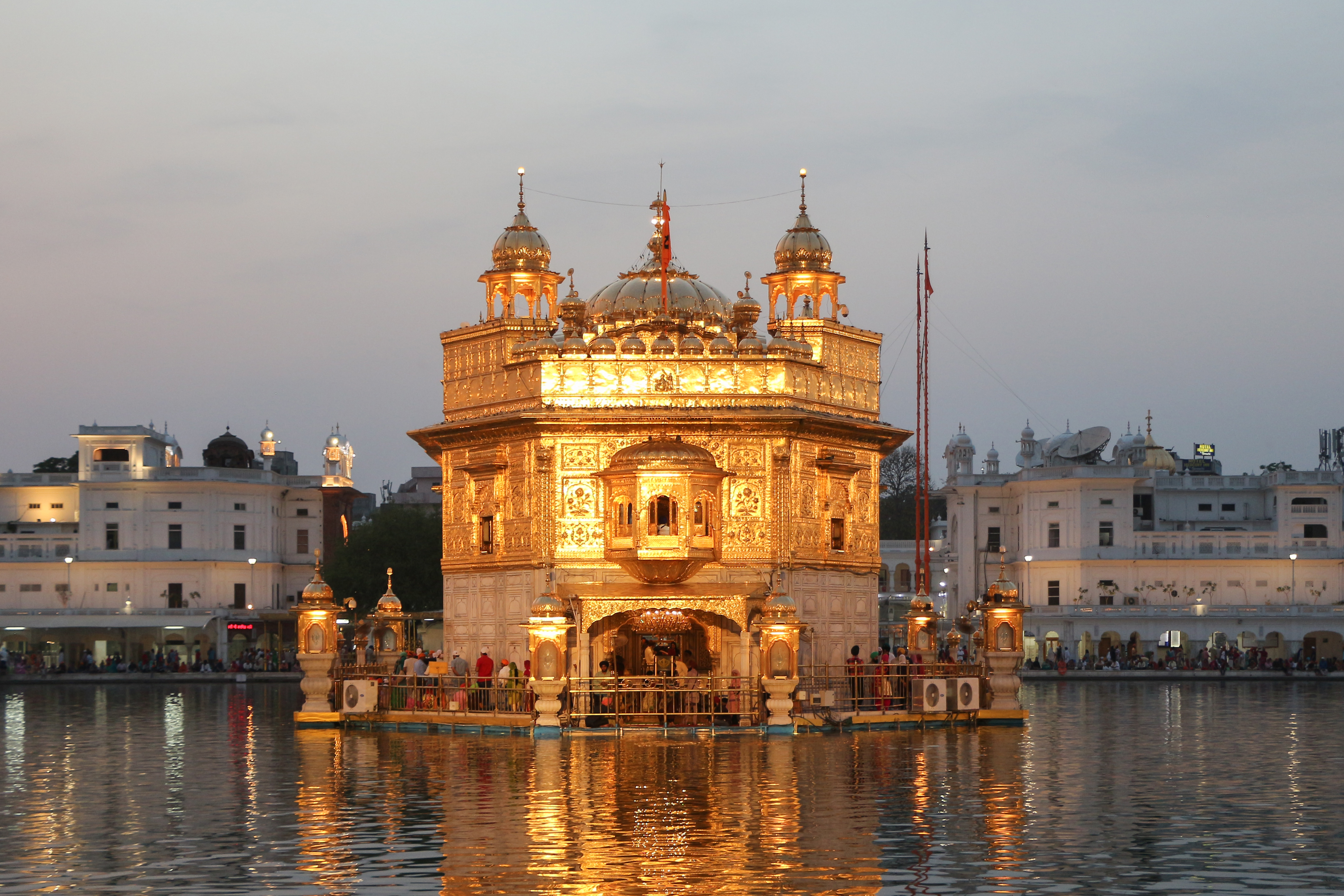
Golden Temple

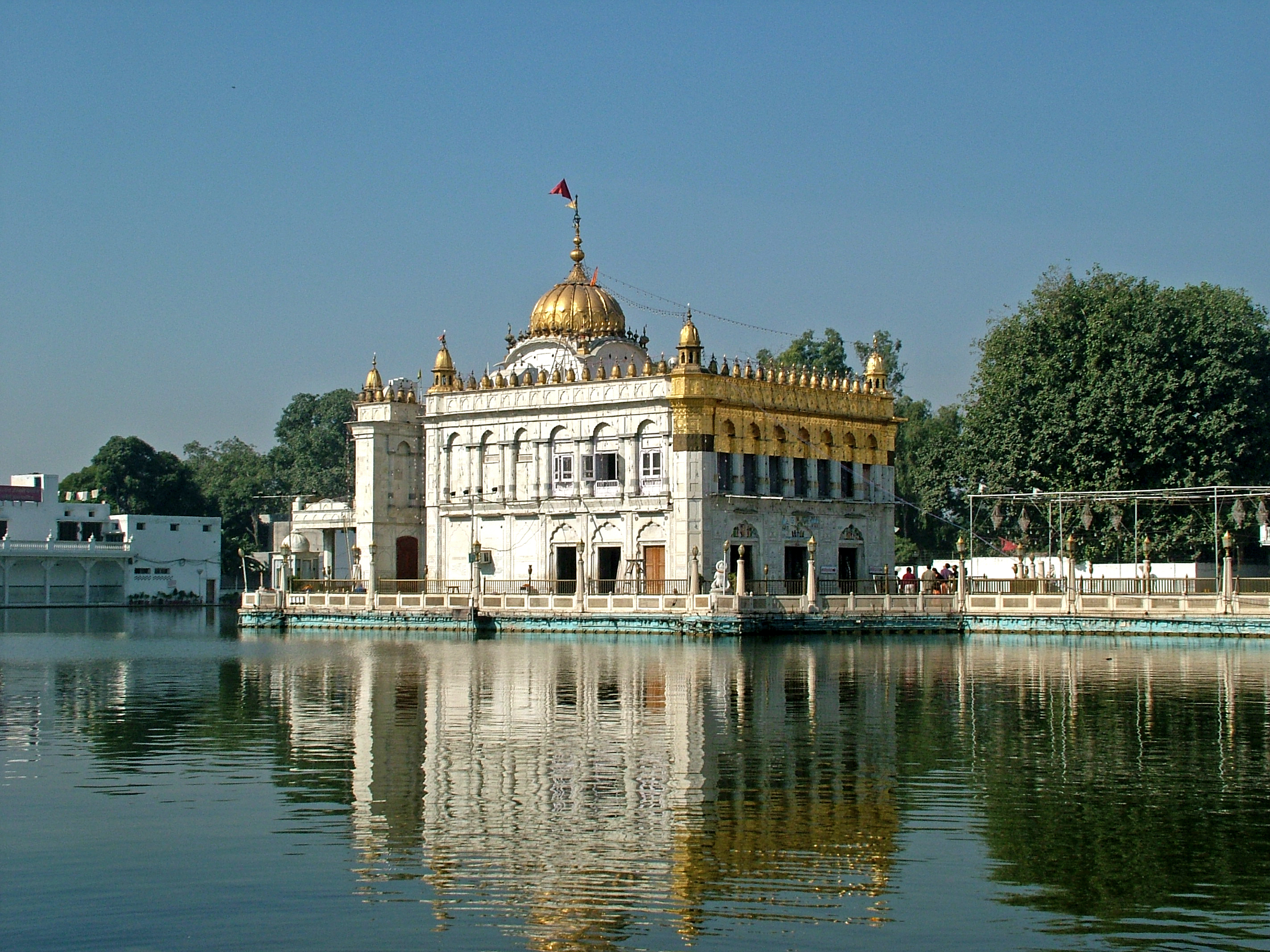
Durgiana Temple

Jama Masjid, Jalandhar

The Sikh shrine, Golden Temple (Harmandir Sahib), is in the city of Amritsar, which houses the Shiromani Gurdwara Parbandhak Committee, the topmost Sikh religious body. The Sri Akal Takht Sahib, which is within the Golden Temple complex, is the highest temporal seat of Sikhs. Of the five Takhts (Temporal Seats of religious authority) of Sikhism, three are in Punjab. These are Sri Akal Takht Sahib, Damdama Sahib, and Anandpur Sahib. At least one Sikh Gurdwara can be found in almost every village in the state, as well as in the towns and cities (in various architectural styles and sizes).

Hindu Mandirs can be found all over Punjab with the Shri Durgiana Mandir in Amritsar, and the Shri Devi Talab Mandir in Jalandhar visited by many pilgrims every year. A segment of Punjabi Hindus exhibits syncretic religious traditions in spiritual kinship with Sikhism. This not only includes veneration of the Sikh Gurus in private practice but also visits to Sikh Gurdwaras in addition to Hindu Mandirs.

== Government and politics ==
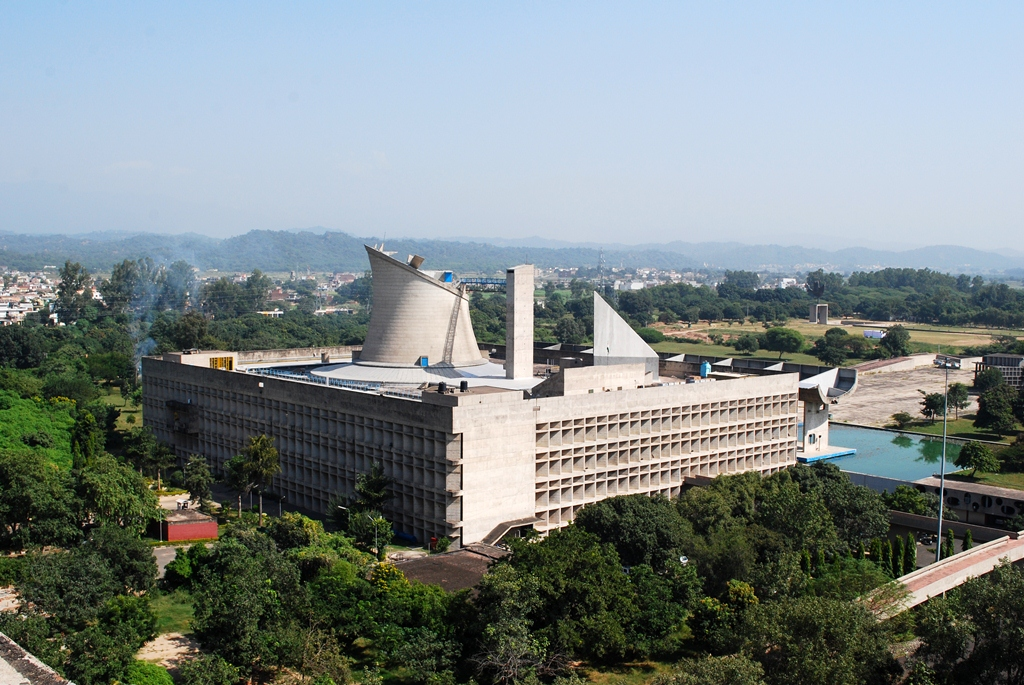
Punjab Legislative Assembly building

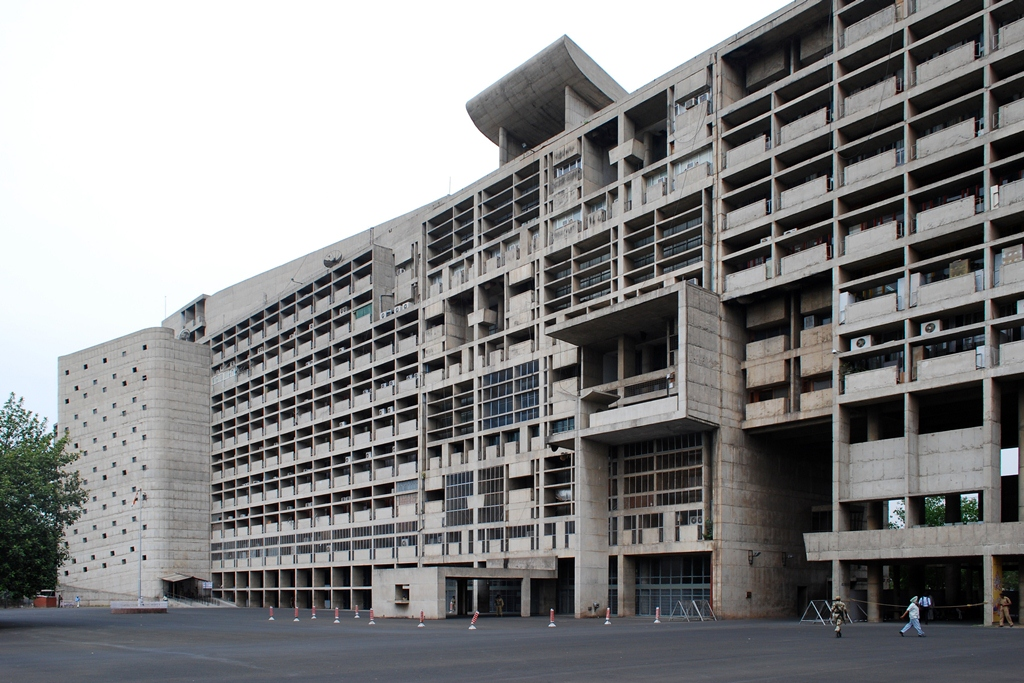
Punjab Civil Secretariat, Chandigarh

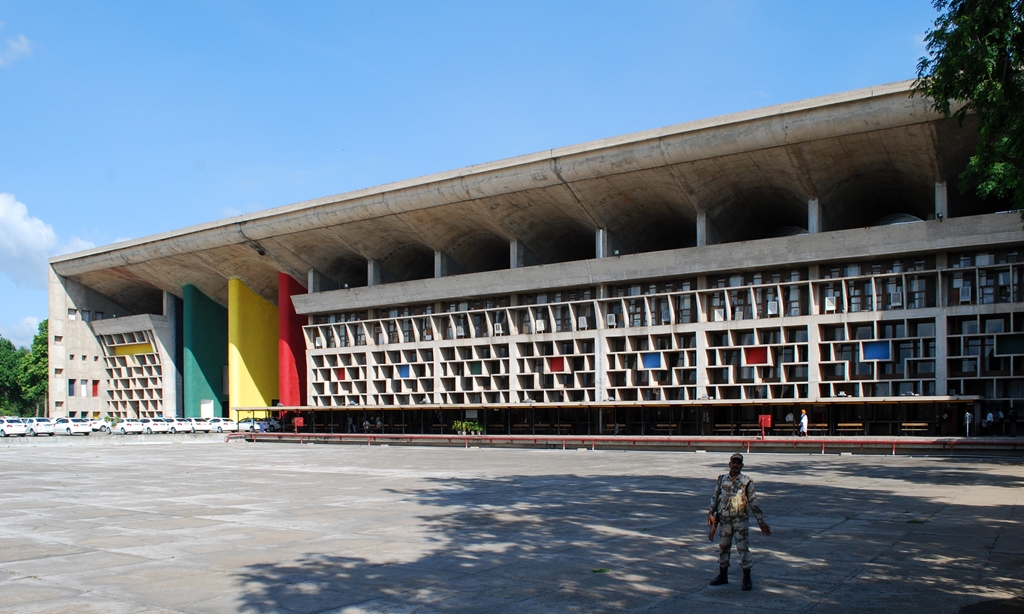
Punjab and Haryana High Court

Punjab is governed through a parliamentary system of representative democracy. The Constitution of India provides for a parliamentary system of government in the states, with a Governor appointed by the President of India. The Governor is the constitutional head of the state, while executive power is exercised by the Chief Minister and the Council of Ministers, who are responsible to the state legislature. The term of the state legislative assembly is normally five years unless dissolved earlier.

The state legislature, the Vidhan Sabha, is unicameral and consists of 117 members elected from single-member constituencies.

The capital of Punjab is Chandigarh, which also serves as the capital of Haryana and is administered separately as a union territory of India. The Punjab and Haryana High Court in Chandigarh is the High Court for Punjab and Haryana.

As of September 2026, Aam Aadmi Party (AAP) leads the state government, with Bhagwant Mann serving as Chief Minister. Gulab Chand Kataria is the Governor of Punjab.

The principal political parties represented in Punjab politics include the Aam Aadmi Party, the Indian National Congress, the Shiromani Akali Dal and the Bharatiya Janata Party. In the 2022 Punjab Legislative Assembly election, the Aam Aadmi Party won 92 of the 117 seats, the Indian National Congress won 18, the Shiromani Akali Dal won 3, the Bahujan Samaj Party won 1 and the Bharatiya Janata Party won 2 seats.

The Shiromani Akali Dal has historically played a major role in Punjab politics, particularly in representing Sikh and regional interests. The Indian National Congress has also been a major political force in the state. The Aam Aadmi Party became the governing party after the 2022 assembly election. Ahead of the next scheduled assembly election, expected in 2027, AAP, Congress, SAD and BJP remain among the principal parties contesting the political space in the state.

President's rule has been imposed in Punjab on several occasions since independence. The longest period occurred from 1987 to 1992, during the period of militancy in Punjab. President's rule was imposed in 1987 and continued until assembly elections were held in 1992.

Punjab's law and order is administered by the Punjab Police. The force is headed by the Director General of Police (DGP). As of September 2026, Gaurav Yadav is serving as the DGP of Punjab Police.

== Administrative set-up ==
Republic of India
States and Union Territories (e.g. Punjab State)
Division (e.g. Patiala division)
District (e.g. Ludhiana district)
Sub-district (e.g. Ludhiana East tehsil)
Sub-sub-district (e.g. sub-tehsil, community development block, etc.)
Local governing systems (e.g. revenue village, panchayat, municipal corporation), etc.

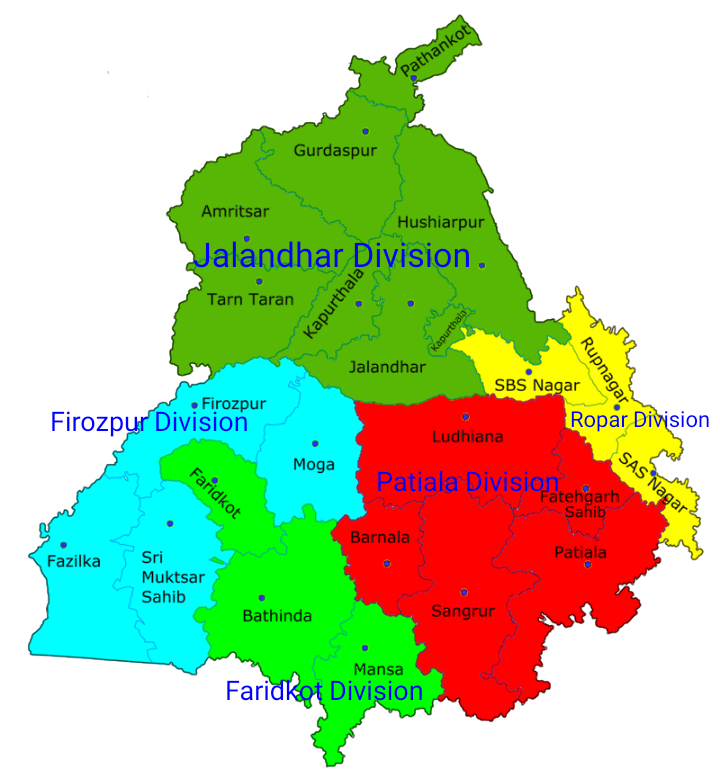
Administrative divisions of Punjab

The state of Punjab has the following civil administrative set-up regarding subdivisional levels of governance:

1. Divisions (5) - headed by a Divisional Commissioner
2. Districts (23) - headed by a Deputy Commissioner or District Magistrate
3. Sub-district level, consisting of:
  - Sub-divisions (93) - headed by a Sub Divisional Magistrate
  - Tehsils (93) - headed by a Tehsildar
  - Sub-tehsils (87) - headed by a Naib Tehsildar
  - Development blocks (150) - headed by a block development and panchayat officer (BDPO), an executive officer of Block Samiti, and chairman of the blocksamiti
4. Settlements, consisting of villages (12,581), towns, and cities, managed by panchayats (Panchayat samiti and Gram panchayat), improvement trusts, municipal corporations, etc.

Districts are officially divided among 5 administrative divisions: Faridkot, Ferozepur, Jalandhar, Patiala, and Ropar. Roper division was created on 31 December 2010, which was a part of Patiala Division earlier).

Administrative Divisions and Corresponding Districts of Punjab
S. No.	Name of the Division	No. of districts	Name of the Districts
1	Faridkot	3	Bathinda, Faridkot, Mansa
2	Ferozepur	4	Fazilka, Ferozepur, Moga, Sri Muktsar Sahib
3	Jalandhar	7	Amritsar, Gurdaspur, Hoshiarpur, Jalandhar, Kapurthala, Pathankot, Tarn Taran
4	Patiala	6	Barnala, Fatehgarh Sahib, Ludhiana, Malerkotla, Patiala, Sangrur
5	Ropar	3	Rupnagar, SAS Nagar, SBS Nagar

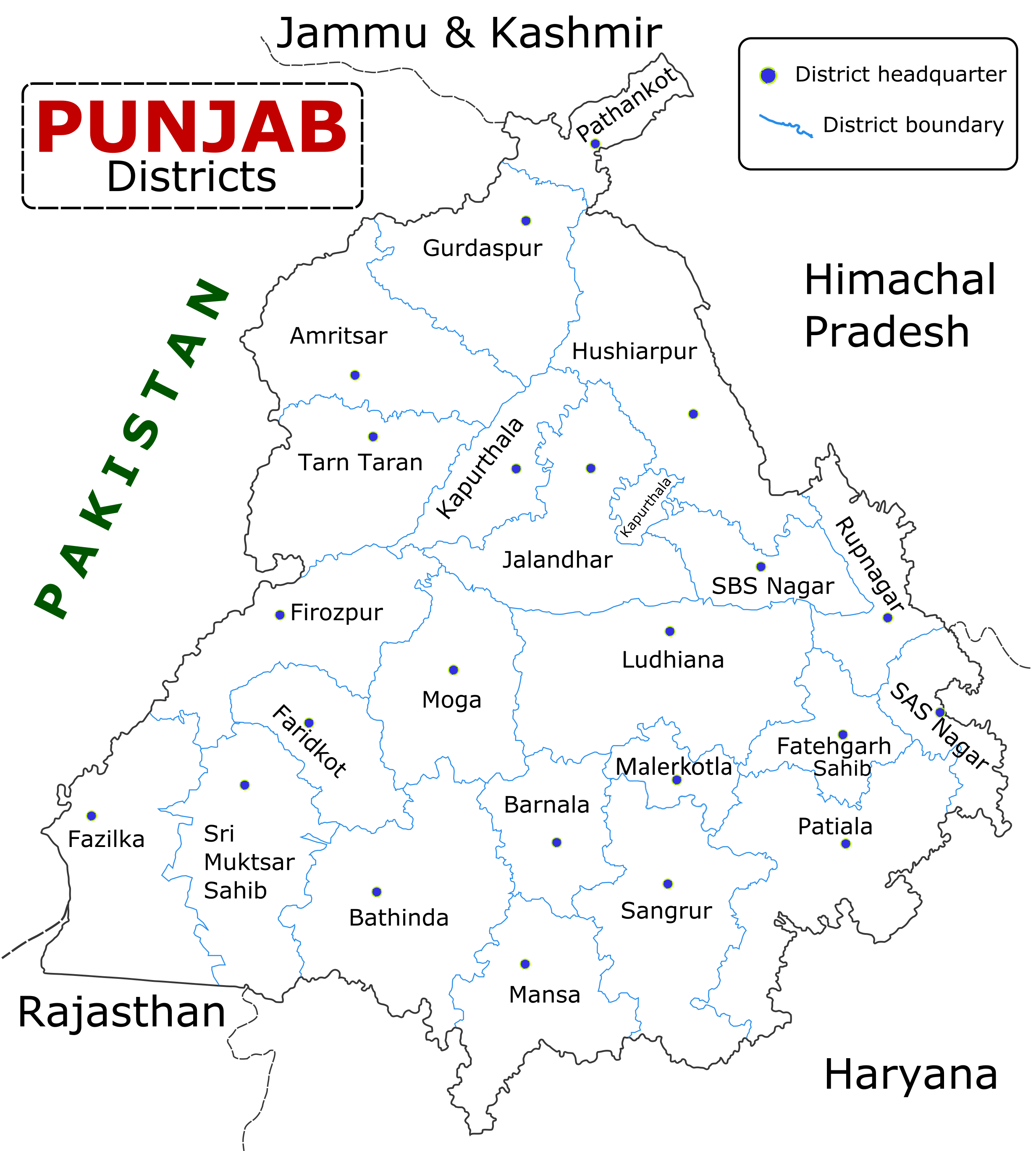
Districts of Punjab along with their headquarters

There are currently twenty-three districts in Punjab. Each district is under the administrative control of a Deputy Commissioner (DC), an IAS officer. The DC functions as the Collector for land revenue administration and as the District Magistrate (DM) for maintaining law and order in the district. The DC is assisted by Additional Deputy Commissioners (ADCs) at collectorate. The district magistrate or the deputy commissioner are also assisted by officers of the Punjab Civil Service and other state services. Policing for each district is the responsibility of a Senior Superintendent of Police who belongs to the Indian Police Service. Furthermore, each district has a division forest officer who is appointed from the Indian Forest Service to manage forests, wildlife, and the environment of the district, being assisted by officers belonging to the Punjab Forest Service and other environment-related officials. Also at the district level are district heads of the respective branch of the Public Works Department, Agriculture, Health, Education, and Animal Husbandry departments. These departments comprise of officers who belong to various state services. The districts are subdivided into subdivisions and tehsils, headed by Sub-divisional magistrates (SDMs, selected from the State Civil Services/Punjab Civil Services) and Tehsildars (a revenue officer). As per Sunita Kaler, Punjab is a state in which there is little or no difference between tehsils and sub-divisions as they share the same boundaries as one another, unlike some other Indian states where these two terms refer to distinct administrative schemes. In India, the tehsil and talukas are important for land records and land revenue. The districts are subdivided into 93 tehsils, which have fiscal and administrative powers over settlements within their borders, including maintenance of local land records comes under the administrative control of a Tehsildar. Each Tehsil consists of blocks which are total 150 in number. Each block comprises of a block development and panchayat office (BDPO Office/BDO) and Block Samiti, headed by a block development and panchayat officer (BDPO) and executive officer of Block Samiti. Elected politically is a chairman of the blocksamiti. These blocks consist of Revenue Villages. There are total number of revenue villages in the state is 12,278.

There are 23 Zila Parishads, 136 Municipal Committees and 22 Improvement Trusts looking after 143 towns and 14 cities of Punjab. The local government institutions such as Panchayats looking after the governance of rural areas and municipalities looking after the governance of urban areas.

== Traditional regions ==
Punjab can be geographically classified under the traditional Majha, Malwa, Doaba, and Puadh regions (demarcated by river boundaries), They are as follows (along with the districts belonging to each region):

- Majha (4) - located in the tract between the Ravi and Beas rivers
  - 1. Amritsar
  - 2. Gurdaspur
  - 3. Pathankot
  - 4. Tarn Taran
- Doaba (4) - located in the tract between the Sutlej and Beas rivers
  - 1. Hoshiarpur 2. Jalandhar 3. Kapurthala
  - 4. Shaheed Bhagat Singh Nagar
- Malwa (12) - located south of the Sutlej river
  - 1. Barnala 2. Bathinda 3. Firozpur 4. Fazilka
  - 5. Faridkot 6. Ludhiana 7. Moga 8. Malerkotla
  - 9. Mansa 10. Sri Muktsar Sahib 11. Patiala 12. Sangrur
- Puadh (3) - located near the Ghaggar river
  - 1. SAS Nagar (Mohali)
  - 2. Rupnagar
  - 3. Fatehgarh Sahib

As per H. S. Bhatti, the region of Indian Punjab can be further divided into three main regions: Majha, Doaba, and Malwa (he classifies Puadh as a sub-region subsumed under Malwa), which are based upon the flow of rivers and speak different dialects of the Punjabi language. They comprise the following districts (as they existed in 2000):

- Majha: Amritsar and Gurdaspur districts
- Doaba: Jalandhar, Hoshiarpur, Kapurthala, and Nawanshahr districts
- Malwa: Bathinda, Faridkot, Firozpur, Muktsar, Moga, Mansa, Sangrur, Ludhiana, Patiala, Ropar, and Fatehgarh Sahib districts

Another way of dividing up the regions of Punjab (which is not well demarcated and often confusing) is based upon bet (area prone to flooding and comes into the flow of rivers), dhaha (old-bed of a river which are high and sandy but still at risk of flooding), and dakar (far-away from river-banks and usually safe from flooding).

== Economy ==
Punjab's GSDP was estimated at ₹7.39 trillion (US$ 87 billion) at current prices in 2024–25. Punjab is one of the most fertile regions in India. The region is ideal for wheat-growing. Rice, sugar cane, fruits and vegetables are also grown. Indian Punjab is called the "Granary of India" or "India's bread-basket". It remains one of India's major producers of wheat and rice.

Punjab ranked first in GDP per capita among Indian states in 1981 and fourth in 2001, but has experienced slower growth than the rest of India during several periods since 2000.

Punjab produces significant quantities of wheat and rice for India's food-grain supply. In 2021–22, wheat was cultivated on approximately 3.53 million hectares and rice on approximately 3.14 million hectares.

The Firozpur and Fazilka districts are among the major producers of wheat and rice in the state. In worldwide terms, Indian Punjab produces approximately 2% of the world's cotton, 2% of its wheat and 1% of its rice.

=== Agriculture ===
Aerial view of agricultural fields in Punjab

Punjab's economy has been primarily agriculture-based since the Green Revolution due to the presence of abundant water sources and fertile soils; most of the state lies in a fertile alluvial plain with many rivers and an extensive irrigation canal system. The largest cultivated crop is wheat. Other important crops are rice, cotton, sugarcane, pearl millet, maize, barley and fruit. Rice and wheat are doublecropped in Punjab with rice stalks being burned off over millions of acres prior to the planting of wheat. This widespread practice is polluting and wasteful. Despite covering only 1.53% of its geographical area, Punjab makes up for about 15–20% of India's wheat production, around 12% of its rice production, and around 5% of its milk production, being known as India's breadbasket. About 80%-95% of Punjab's agricultural land is owned by its Jat Sikh community despite it only forming 21% of the state's population.

In Punjab the consumption of fertiliser per hectare is 223.46 kg as compared to 90 kg nationally. The state has been awarded the National Productivity Award for agriculture extension services for ten years, from 1991 to 1992 to 1998–99 and from 2001 to 2003–04. In recent years a drop in productivity has been observed, mainly due to falling fertility of the soil. This is believed to be due to excessive use of fertilisers and pesticides over the years. Another worry is the rapidly falling water table on which almost 90% of the agriculture depends; alarming drops have been witnessed in recent years. By some estimates, groundwater is falling by a meter or more per year.

According to the India State Hunger Index 2019–20, Punjab falls under the "Moderate" hunger category in India.

=== Industries ===
Other major industries include financial services, the manufacturing of scientific instruments, agricultural goods, electrical goods, machine tools, textiles, sewing machines, sports goods, starch, fertilisers, bicycles, garments, and the processing of pine oil and sugar. Minerals and energy resources also contribute to Punjab's economy to a much lesser extent. Punjab has the largest number of steel rolling mill plants in India, which are in "Steel Town"—Mandi Gobindgarh in the Fatehgarh Sahib district.

=== Remittances ===
Punjab also has a large diaspora that is mostly settled in the United Kingdom, the United States, and Canada, numbers about 3 million, and sends back billions of USD in remittances to the state, playing a major role in its economy.

== Transport ==
=== Air ===
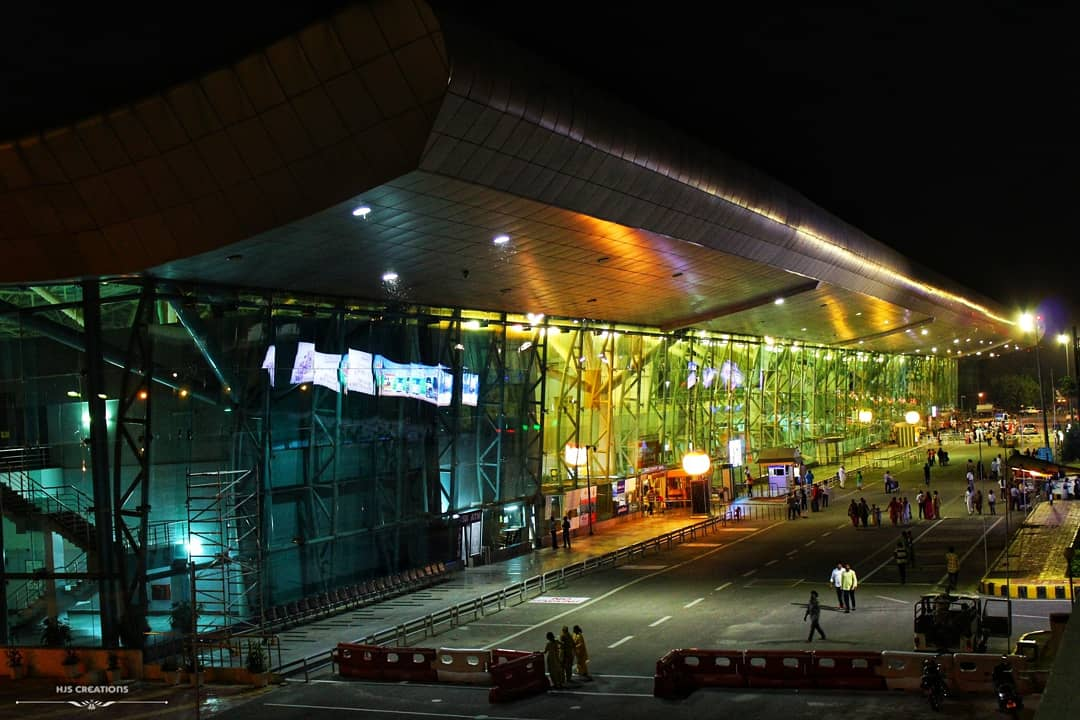
Sri Guru Ram Das Ji International Airport in Amritsar

Punjab has six civil airports including two international airports: Amritsar International Airport and Chandigarh Airport at Mohali; and four domestic airports: Bathinda Airport, Pathankot Airport, Adampur Airport (Jalandhar) and Ludhiana Airport. Apart from these 6 airports, there are 2 airfields at Beas (Amritsar) and Patiala which do not serve any commercial flight operations, as of now.

Sri Guru Ram Das Ji International Airport in Amritsar, is the Primary Hub Airport and Gateway to Punjab, as the airport serves direct connectivity to key cities around the world, including London, Singapore, Milan, Dubai, Birmingham among others.

=== Railways ===
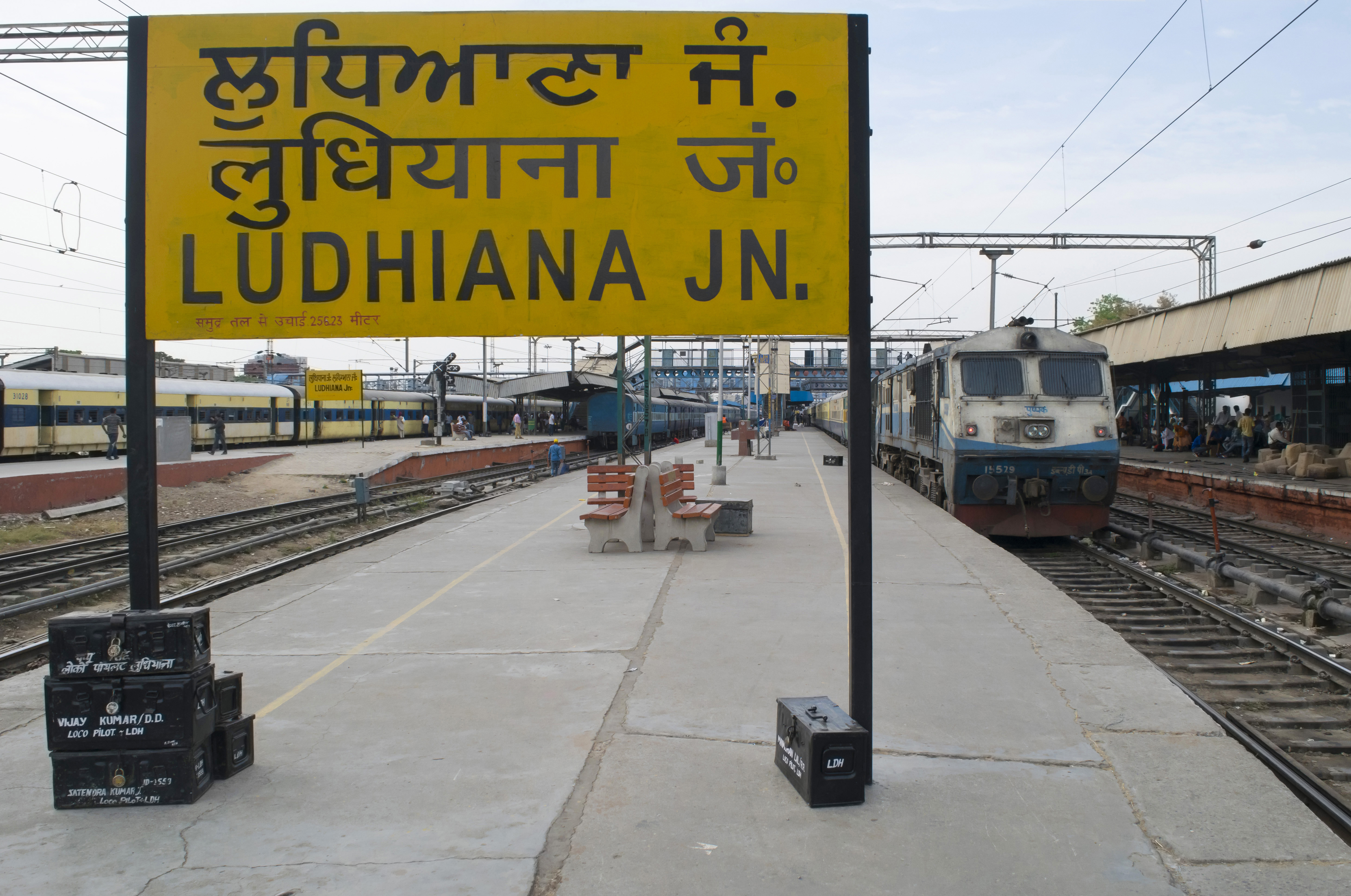
View of Ludhiana railway station

The Indian Railways' Northern Railway line runs through the state connecting most of the major towns and cities. Premium trains like the Vande Bharat Express and Shatabdi Express connect Amritsar to New Delhi, covering a total distance of 449 km. Amritsar Junction railway station is the busiest junction of the state. Bathinda Junction holds the record of maximum railway lines from a railway junction in Asia. Punjab's major railway stations are Amritsar Junction (ASR), Ludhiana Junction (LDH), Jalandhar Cantonment (JRC), Firozpur Cantonment (FZR), Jalandhar City Junction (JUC), Pathankot Junction (PTK) and Patiala railway station (PTA). The railway station of Amritsar is included in the Indian Railways list of 50 world-class railway stations.

=== Roads ===
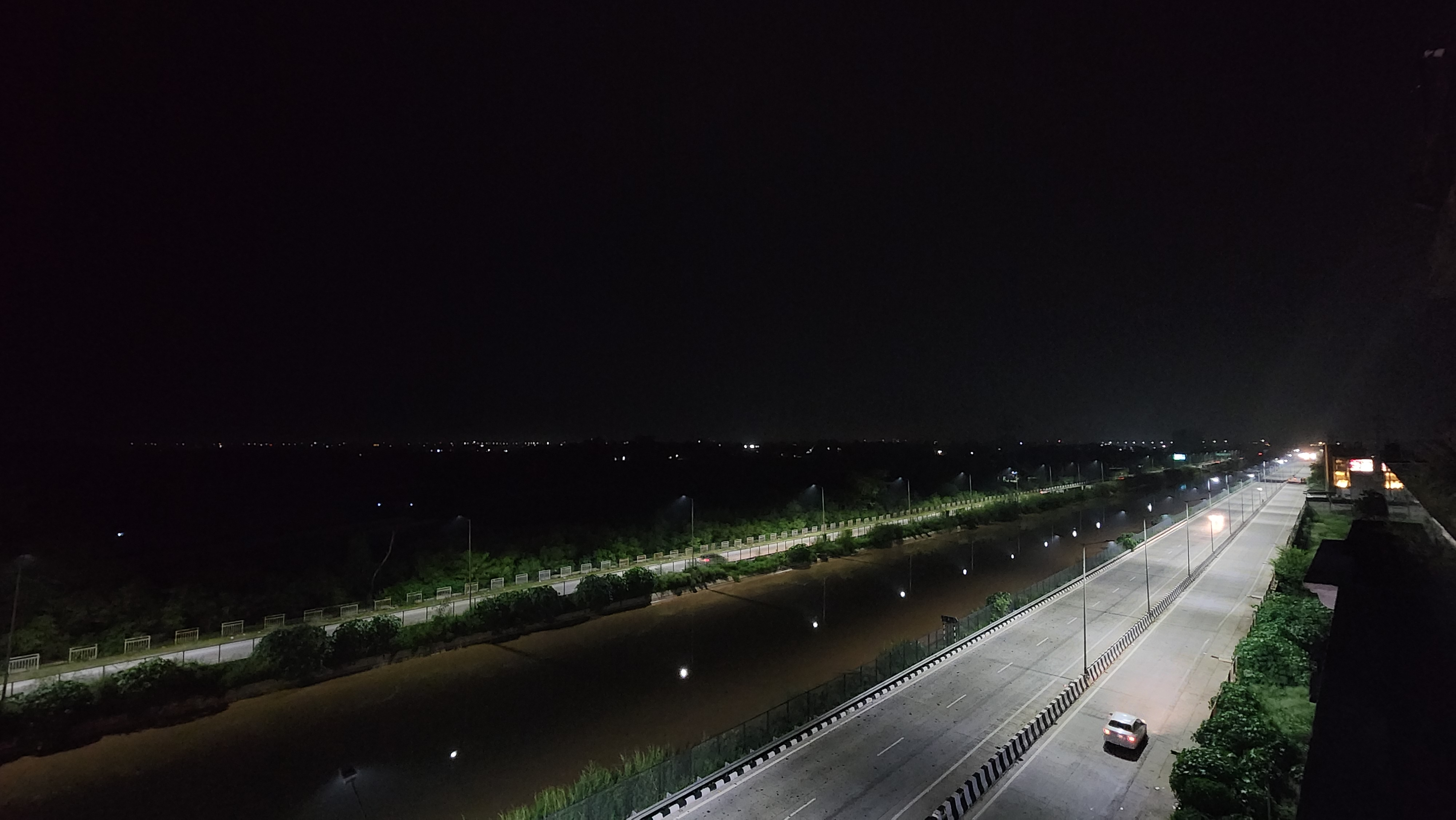
Canal Road (NH5) passing through Ludhiana

All the cities and towns of Punjab are connected by four-lane national highways. The Grand Trunk Road, also known as "NH1", connects Kolkata to Peshawar, passing through Amritsar and Jalandhar. National highways passing through the state are ranked the best in the country with widespread road networks that serve isolated towns as well as the border region. Amritsar and Ludhiana are among several Indian cities that have the highest accident rates in India.

The following expressways will pass through Punjab:

- Delhi–Amritsar–Katra Expressway from Delhi to Katra (National Expressway 5)
- Amritsar–Jamnagar Expressway from Amritsar to Jamnagar
- Pathankot–Ajmer Expressway from Pathankot to Ajmer

The following national highways connect major towns, cities and villages:

- National Highway 1
- National Highway 10
- National Highway 15
- National Highway 1A
- National Highway 54
- National Highway 20
- National Highway 21
- National Highway 22
- National Highway 64
- National Highway 70
- National Highway 71
- National Highway 95

=== Urban Rapid Transit System ===
There are also a bus rapid transit system Amritsar BRTS in the holy city of Amritsar, popularly known as 'Amritsar MetroBus'

== Education ==
=== Schools ===
Primary and Secondary education is mainly affiliated to Punjab School Education Board. Punjab is served by several institutions of higher education, including 23 universities that provide undergraduate and postgraduate courses in all the major arts, humanities, science, engineering, law, medicine, veterinary science, and business. Reading and writing Punjabi language is compulsory until matriculation for every student failing which the schools attract fine or cancellation of licence.

The table below shows the district level teacher to pupil ratio from class 1 to 5 in Punjab, as of 2017.

District-wise Teacher-Pupil Ratio of Class 1 to 5 in 2017 (As on 30 September)
Sr. No.	District	Ratio	S.N.	District	Ratio	S.N.	District	Ratio
1	Hoshiarpur	15	8	Kapurthala	20	16	Barnala	26
2	Rupnagar	16	9	Faridkot	20	17	Fazilka	27
3	Fatehgarh Sahib	16	10	Sri Muktsar Sahib	20	18	Amritsar	30
4	SAS Nagar	17	11	Jalandhar	21	19	Ferozpur	30
5	SBS Nagar	18	12	Sangrur	21	20	Mansa	30
6	Gurdaspur	18	13	Patiala	22	21	Moga	31
7	Pathankot	19	14	Ludhiana	24	22	Taran taran	46
			15	Bathinda	24			

The table below shows the average population per school in each district of Punjab as of 2011 census and the total number of schools as of 2017. This includes government schools, affiliated schools, recognised and aided schools. Note:- Pathankot and Fazilka were part of Gurdaspur and Ferozepur respectively, before 2011, so separate data for them regarding the average population per school is not available.

District-wise average price per school as of 2011 census and total number of schools as of 2017
Sr. No.	District	Average population per school (2011)	Total number of schools (2017)
1	SBS Nagar	2,251	272
2	Kapurthala	2,433	335
3	Fatehgarh Sahib	2,480	242
4	Gurdaspur	2,582	637
	Pathankot	----	193
5	Hoshiarpur	2,584	614
6	Moga	2,613	381
7	Faridkot	2,616	236
8	Rupnagar	2,706	253
9	Sangrur	2,908	569
10	Sri Muktsar Sahib	2,918	309
11	Mansa	2,937	262
12	Ferozpur	3,023	419
	Fazilka	----	252
13	Patiala	3,251	583
14	Barnala	3,403	175
15	Jalandhar	3,476	631
16	Bathinda	3,533	393
17	Amritsar	3,722	669
18	Ludhiana	3,770	928
19	SAS Nagar	3,812	261
20	Taran taran	4,373	372

=== Colleges and universities ===
Punjab Agricultural University is a leading institution globally for the study of agriculture and played a significant role in Punjab's Green Revolution in the 1960s–70s. Alumni of the Panjab University, Chandigarh include Manmohan Singh, the former Prime Minister of India, and Har Gobind Khorana, a biochemistry nobel laureate. One of the oldest institutions of medical education is the Christian Medical College, Ludhiana, which has existed since 1894. There is an existing gap in education between men and women, particularly in rural areas of Punjab. Of a total of 1 million 300 thousand students enrolled in grades five to eight, only 44% are women.

Punjab has 23 universities, of which ten are private, 9 are state, one is central and three are deemed universities. Punjab has 104,000 (104,000) engineering seats.

Punjab is also increasingly becoming known for education of yoga and naturopathy, with its student slowly adopting these as their career. The Board of Naturopathy and Yoga Science (BNYS) is located in the state. Regional College Dinanagar is the first college to be opened in Dinanagar Town.

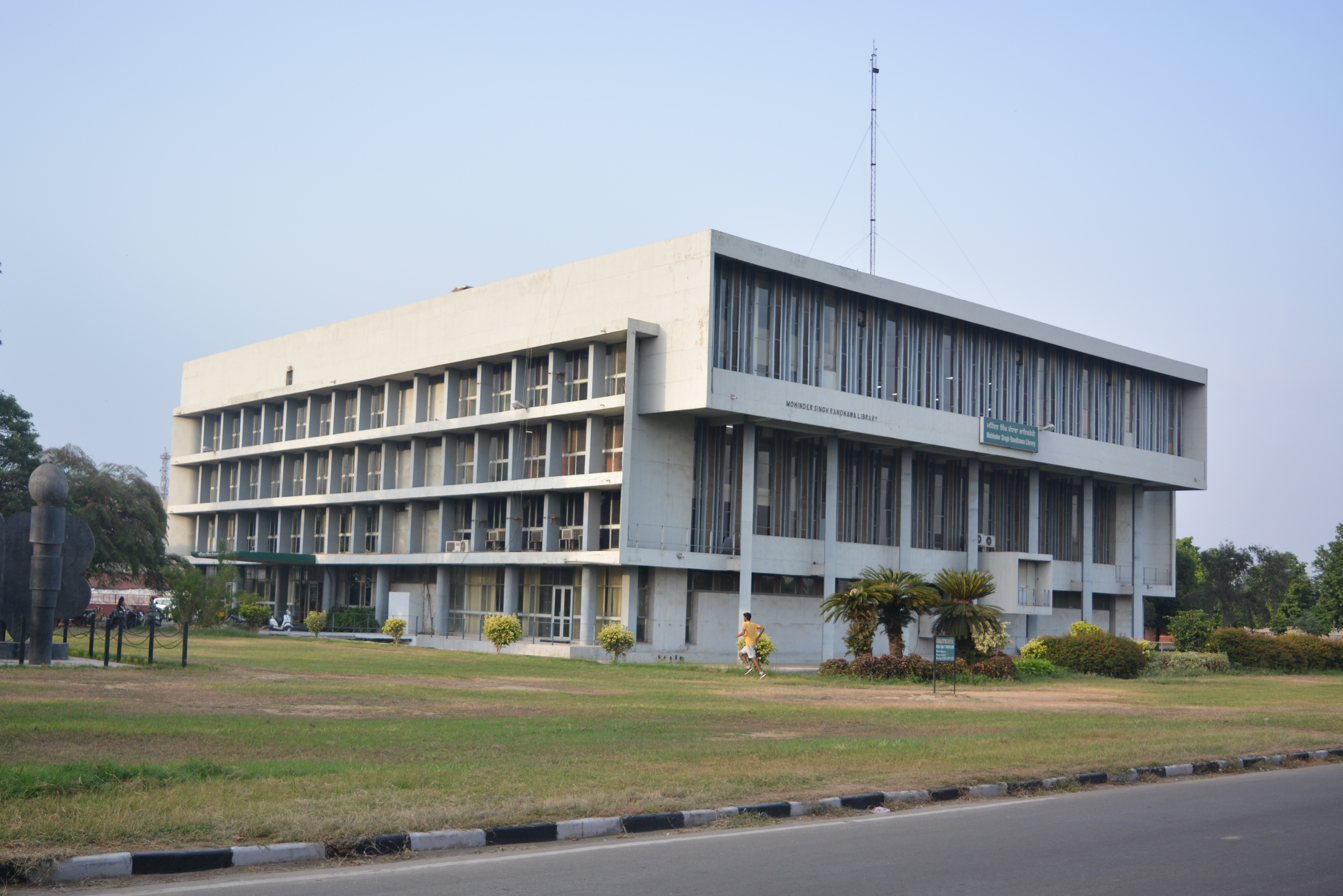
Punjab Agricultural University

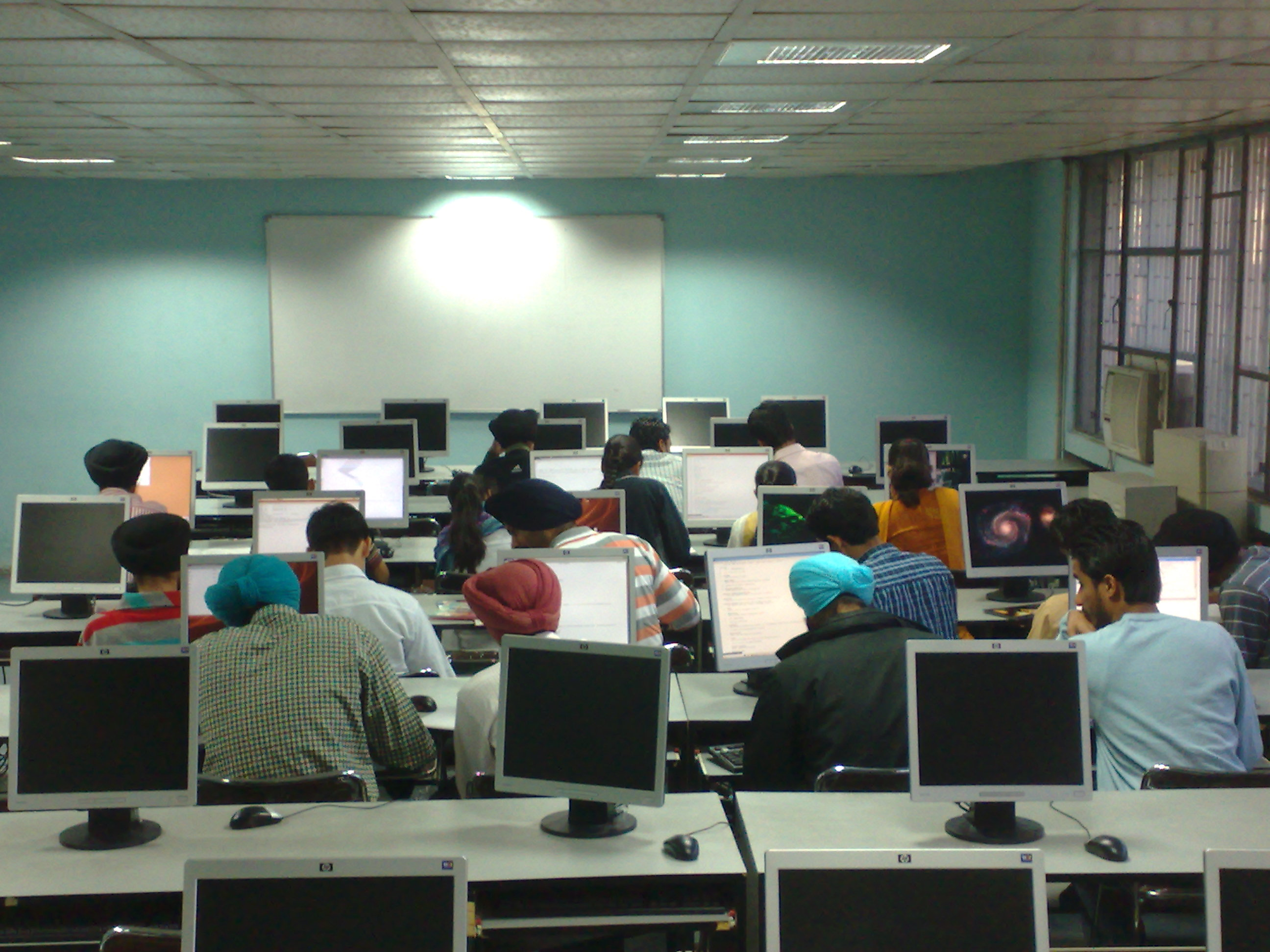
Students working in GNDEC

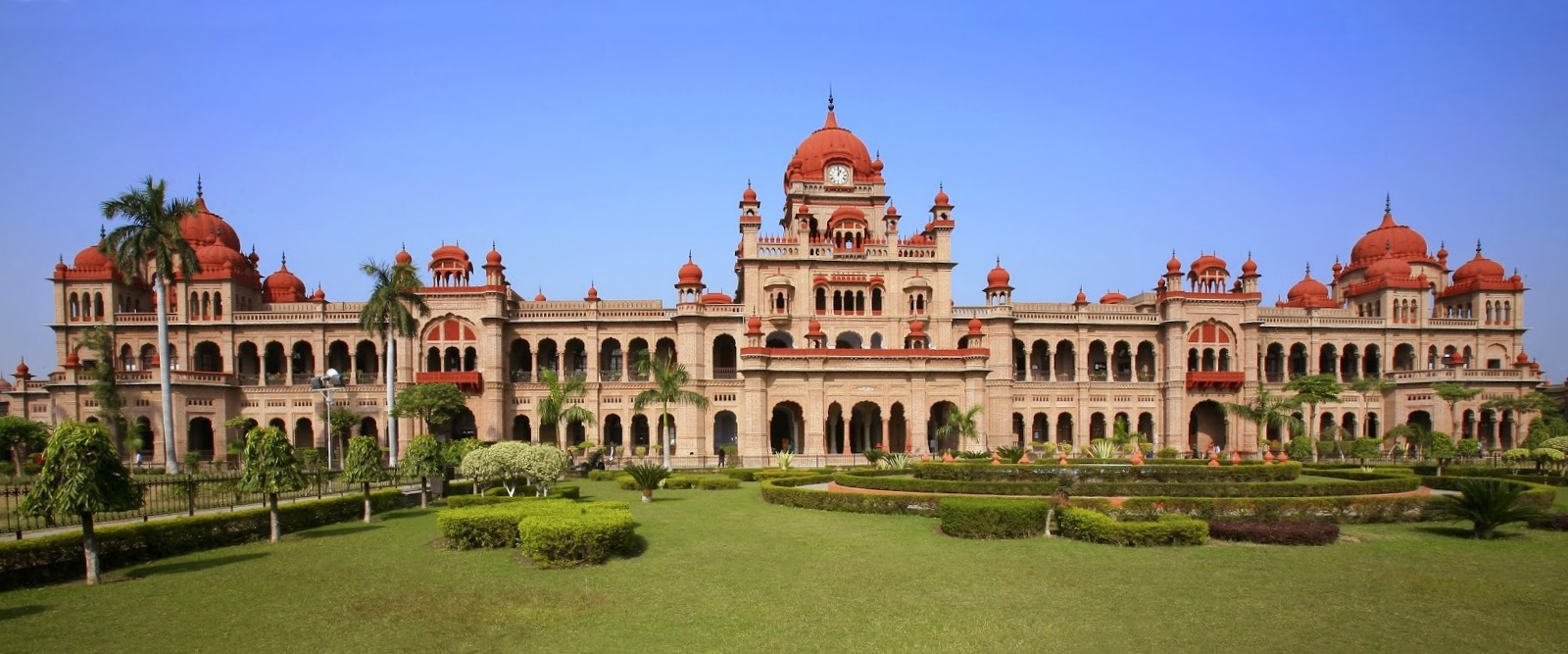
Khalsa College, Amritsar

Punjabi University, Patiala

The Ranjit Singh Block at Guru Nanak Dev University

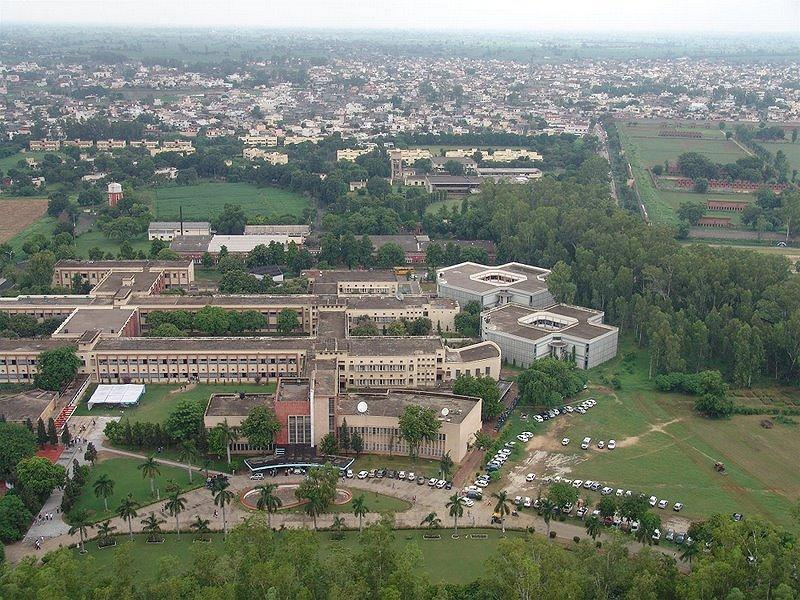
Thapar Institute

== Health ==
According to the National Family Health Survey (NFHS) data from 2015–16, the rate stunting (low height for age) for children between the ages of 0–59 months was 26%, which was lower than the national average of 38%. As of 2015–16, 56.6% children between the ages of 0–57 months were said to be having some degree of anaemia in Punjab. According to the national family health survey of 2020–21, anaemia rate increased to 71.1%.

According to the National Family Health Survey 2020–21, the percentage of people in Punjab above the age of 15 who consume alcohol was 22.8% for men and 0.3% for women. The rate of tobacco usage in the same age group was 12.9% for men and 0.4% for women. According to the same report, the percentage of males in the age group of 15–49 who were obese or overweight was 32.2% in 2020–21, which an increase from the 27.8% in 2015–16. For women in the same age group, the number in 2020–21 was 40.8% which was an increase from 31.3% in 2015–16. Moreover, according to the same report, 63.1% of the men and 72.8% of the women have high risk waist-to-hip ratio, as of 2020–21.

The table below shows the district wise number of registered doctors and other registered medical personnel in Punjab, in year 2018. Note: The ranks of the districts in this table are in the descending order of the number of registered doctors.

District wise number of registered doctors and other medical personnel in Punjab, in year 2018
Sr. No.	District	Doctors	Nurses	Midwives
1	Ludhiana	4,989	10,904	8,121
2	Amritsar	4,141	6,531	4,018
3	Patiala	3,935	3,279	1,963
4	Jalandhar	3,268	5,119	4,081
5	Hoshiarpur	1,640	3,944	2,806
6	Sangrur	1,286	2,567	3,374
7	Gurdaspur	1,058	6,118	6,472
8	Ferozpur	1,036	4,459	3,096
9	Bathinda	898	2,104	2,774
10	Rupnagar	864	2,409	2,159
11	Kapurthala	737	2,165	766
12	SAS Nagar	545	2,790	1,788
13	Faridkot	499	2,997	3,037
14	Mansa	325	2,616	3,424
15	Moga	312	3,172	2,084
16	Sri Muktsar Sahib	283	2,648	839
17	SBS Nagar	262	2,516	383
18	Barnala	200	2,037	825
19	Fatehgarh Sahib	198	2,064	306
20	Fazilka	162	460	987
21	Pathankot	145	50	120
22	Tarn Taran	84	3,378	2,370
	Outside State Territory	630	2,855	989
	Punjab	29,772	77,182	56,782

The table below shows the population served per doctor, per nurse and per midwife by districts of Punjab, in the year 2018. Note: The ranks of the districts in the table are in the ascending order of the population served per doctor.

Population served per doctor, per nurse and per midwife in districts of Punjab, in year 2018
Sr. No.	District	Doctor	Nurse	Midwife
1	Faridkot	499	224	225
2	Patiala	551	161	1,172
3	Amritsar	661	424	689
4	Jalandhar	729	465	5,943
5	Ludhiana	780	357	506
6	Rupnagar	844	302	340
7	Bathinda	898	744	585
8	Hoshiarpur	1,017	423	654
9	Gurdaspur	1,058	284	280
10	Ferozpur	1,083	251	377
11	Kapurthala	1,171	398	1,226
12	Sangrur	1,404	703	558
13	Mansa	2,073	319	2,376
14	SAS Nagar	2,264	442	739
15	SBS Nagar	2,408	250	2,183
16	Barnala	3,212	320	714
17	Fatehgarh Sahib	3,286	315	2,745
18	Moga	3,456	339	318
19	Sri Muktsar Sahib	3,561	380	1,375
20	Pathankot	4,943	14,336	7,389
21	Fazilka	7,089	2,496	1,258
22	Tarn Taran	15,210	378	568
	Punjab	522	1,234	950

The table given below shows the population served per doctor in Punjab, by years.

Population served per doctor in Punjab, by years
Year	Population	Year	Population
2018	522	2000	1,490
2012	1,170	1999	1,485
2010	1,250	1998	1,483
2008	1,225	1997	1,472
2007	1,316	1996	1,499
2006	1,263	1995	1,487
2005	1,388	1994	1,501
2004	1,468	1993	1,608
2003	1,489	1992	1,481
2002	1,324	1991	1,514
2001	1,472	1990	1,589

The table below shows the district wise population served per bed.

Population served per bed in districts of Punjab, in year 2018
Sr. No.	District	Population
1	Faridkot	800
2	Amritsar	822
3	Patiala	941
4	Hoshiarpur	1,051
5	SBS Nagar	1,101
6	Rupnagar	1,103
7	Kapurthala	1,141
8	Fatehgarh Sahib	1,218
9	Barnala	1,262
10	Tarn Taran	1,402
11	Jalandhar	1,411
12	Sri Muktsar Sahib	1,427
13	Gurdaspur	1,437
14	Mansa	1,523
15	Sangrur	1,612
16	Pathankot	1,694
17	Ferozpur	1,700
18	Moga	1,700
19	SAS Nagar	1,704
20	Fazilka	1,709
21	Bathinda	1,927
22	Ludhiana	2,397
	Punjab	1,338

== Media ==
Daily Ajit, Jagbani and Punjabi Tribune are the largest-selling Punjabi newspapers while The Tribune is most selling English newspaper. A vast number of weekly, biweekly and monthly magazines are under publication in Punjabi. Other main newspapers are Daily Punjab Times, Rozana Spokesman, Nawan Zamana, etc.

Doordarshan is the broadcaster of the Government of India and its channel DD Punjabi is dedicated to Punjabi. Prominent private Punjabi channels include news channels like BBC Punjabi, ABP Sanjha, Global Punjab TV, News18 Punjab-Haryana-Himachal, Zee Punjab Haryana Himachal, PTC News and entertainment channels like Zee Punjabi, ATN Punjabi Plus, ATN Punjabi, Chardikla Time TV, PTC Punjabi, Colours Punjabi, ATN Punjabi 5, ATN PM One and 9x Tashan.

Punjab has witnessed a growth in FM radio channels, mainly in the cities of Jalandhar, Patiala and Amritsar, which has become hugely popular. There are government radio channels like All India Radio, Jalandhar, All India Radio, Bathinda and FM Gold Ludhiana. Private radio channels include Radio Mirchi, BIG FM 92.7, 94.3 My FM, Radio Mantra and many more.

== Culture ==
Tableau showcasing Punjabi culture at Republic Day Parade

The culture of Punjab has many elements including music such as bhangra, an extensive religious and non-religious dance tradition, a long history of poetry in the Punjabi language, a significant Punjabi film industry that dates back to before Partition, a vast range of cuisine, which has become widely popular abroad, and a number of seasonal and harvest festivals such as Lohri, Basant, Vaisakhi and Teeyan, all of which are celebrated in addition to the religious festivals of India.

A kissa is a Punjabi language oral story-telling tradition that has a mixture of origins ranging from the Arabian Peninsula to Iran and Afghanistan.

Punjabi wedding traditions and ceremonies are a strong reflection of Punjabi culture. Marriage ceremonies are known for their rich rituals, songs, dances, food and dresses, which have evolved over many centuries.

=== Bhangra ===
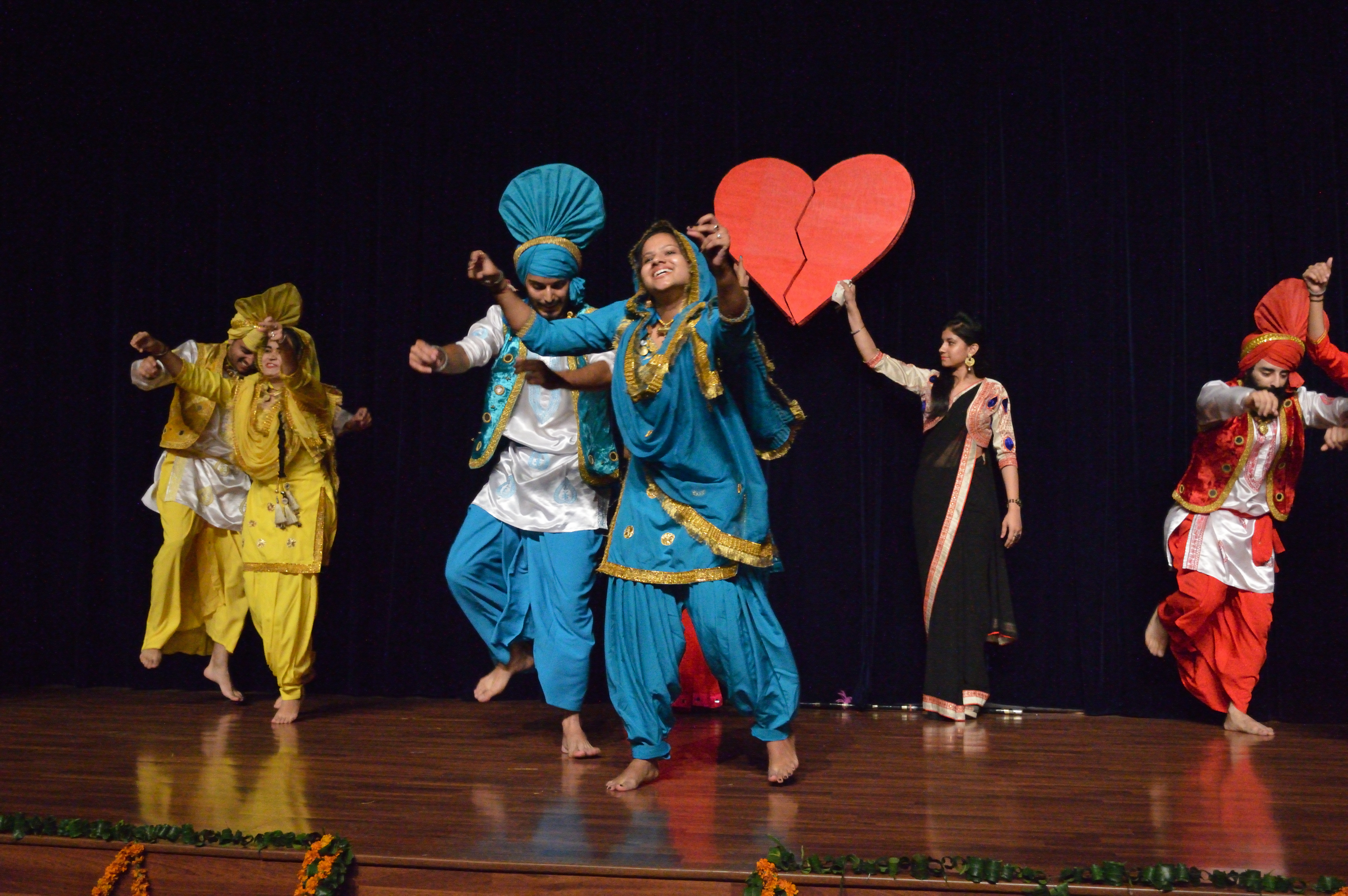
Bhangra

Bhangra (Punjabi: ਭੰਗੜਾ (Gurmukhi); pronounced [pə̀ŋɡᵊ.ɽäː]) and Giddha are forms of dance and music that originated in the Punjab region.

Bhangra dance began as a folk dance conducted by Punjabi farmers to celebrate the coming of the harvest season. The specific moves of Bhangra reflect the manner in which villagers farmed their land. This hybrid dance became Bhangra. The folk dance has been popularised in the western world by Punjabis in England, Canada and the US where competitions are held. It is seen in the West as an expression of South Asian culture as a whole. Today, Bhangra dance survives in different forms and styles all over the globe – including pop music, film soundtracks, collegiate competitions and cultural shows.

=== Punjabi folklore ===
The folk heritage of the Punjab reflects its thousands of years of history. While Majhi is considered to be the standard dialect of Punjabi language, there are a number of Punjabi dialects through which the people communicate. These include Malwai, Doabi and Puadhi. The songs, ballads, epics and romances are generally written and sung in these dialects.

There are a number of folk tales that are popular in Punjab. These are the folk tales of Mirza Sahiban, Heer Ranjha, Sohni Mahiwal, Sassi Punnun, Jagga Jatt, Dulla Bhatti, Puran Bhagat, Jeona Maud etc. The mystic folk songs and religious songs include the Shalooks of Sikh gurus, Baba Farid and others.

The most famous of the romantic love songs are Mayhiah, Dhola and Boliyan. Punjabi romantic dances include Dhamaal, Bhangra, Giddha, Dhola, and Sammi and some other local folk dances.

=== Literature ===
Most early Punjabi literary works are in verse form, with prose not becoming more common until later periods. Throughout its history, Punjabi literature has sought to inform and inspire, educate and entertain. The Punjabi language is written in several different scripts, of which the Shahmukhi, the Gurmukhī scripts are the most commonly used.

=== Music ===
Punjabi Folk Music is the traditional music on the traditional musical instruments of Punjab region.

Bhangra music of Punjab is famous throughout the world.

Punjabi music has a diverse style of music, ranging from folk and Sufi to classical, notably the Punjab gharana and Patiala gharana.

=== Film industry ===
Punjab is home to the Punjabi film industry, often colloquially referred to as 'Pollywood'. It is known for being the fastest growing film industry in India. It is based mainly around Mohali city. According to MP Manish Tewari, the government is planning to build a film city in Mohali.

The first Punjabi film was made in 1936. Since the 2000s Punjabi cinema has seen a revival with more releases every year with bigger budgets, homegrown stars, and Bollywood actors of Punjabi descent taking part.

=== Crafts ===
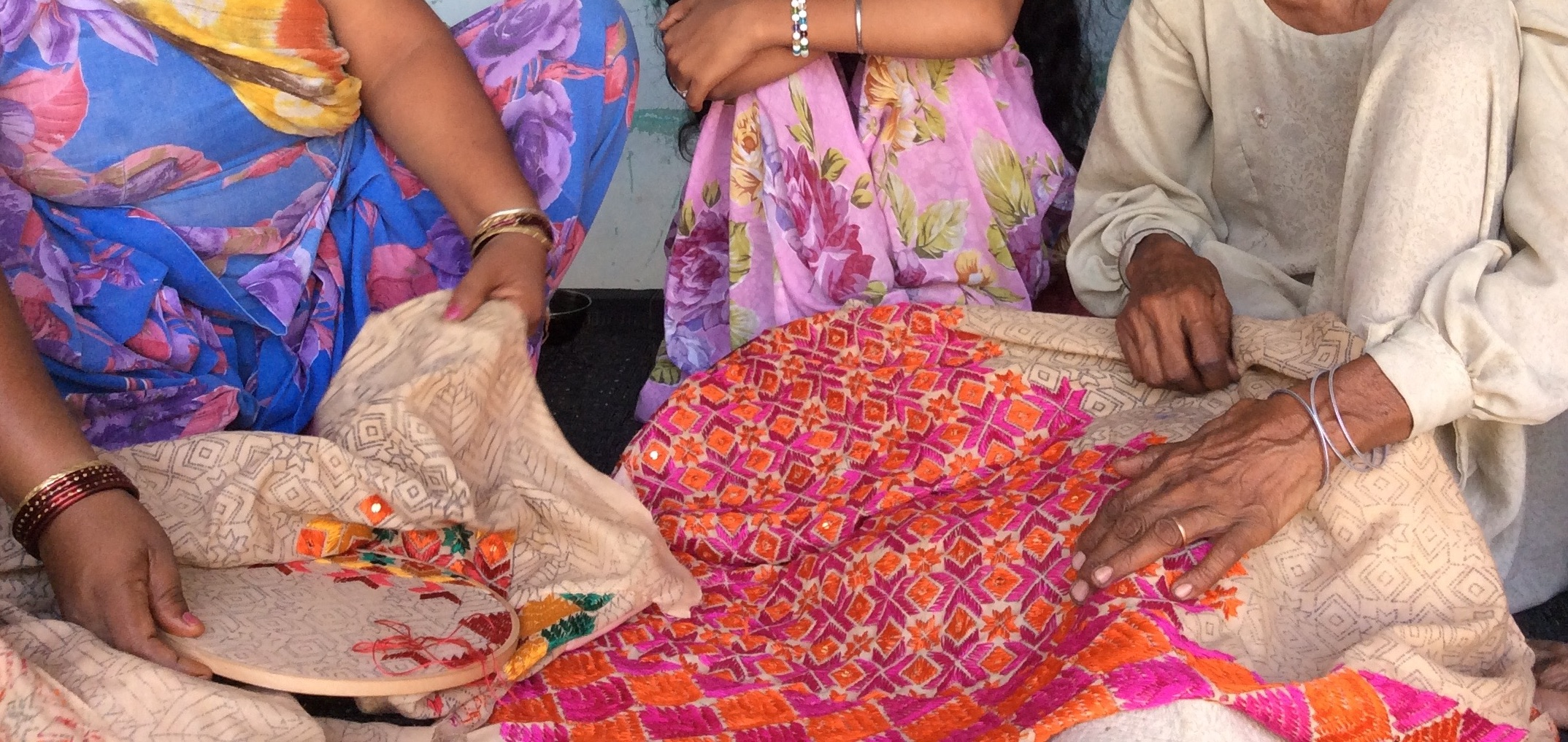
Women embroidering Phulkari

The city of Amritsar is home to the craft of brass and copper metalwork done by the Thatheras of Jandiala Guru, which is enlisted on the UNESCO's List of Intangible Cultural Heritage. Years of neglect had caused this craft to die out, and the listing prompted the Government of Punjab to undertake a craft revival effort under Project Virasat.

=== Cuisine ===
Vegetarian Punjabi Thaali

One of the main features of Punjabi cuisine is its diverse range of dishes. Home cooked and restaurant cuisine sometimes vary in taste. Restaurant style uses large amounts of ghee. Some food items are eaten on a daily basis while some delicacies are cooked only on special occasions.

There are many regional dishes that are famous in some regions only. Many dishes are exclusive to Punjab, including Sarson Da Saag, Tandoori chicken, Shami kebab, makki di roti, etc.

=== Festivals and traditions ===
Heritage Festival, Bathinda

Punjabis celebrate a number of festivals, which have taken a semi-secular meaning and are regarded as cultural festivals by people of all religions. Some of the festivals are Bandi Chhor Divas (Diwali), Mela Maghi, Hola Mohalla, Rakhri, Vaisakhi, Lohri, Gurpurb, Guru Ravidass Jayanti, Teeyan and Basant Kite Festival.

== Sports ==
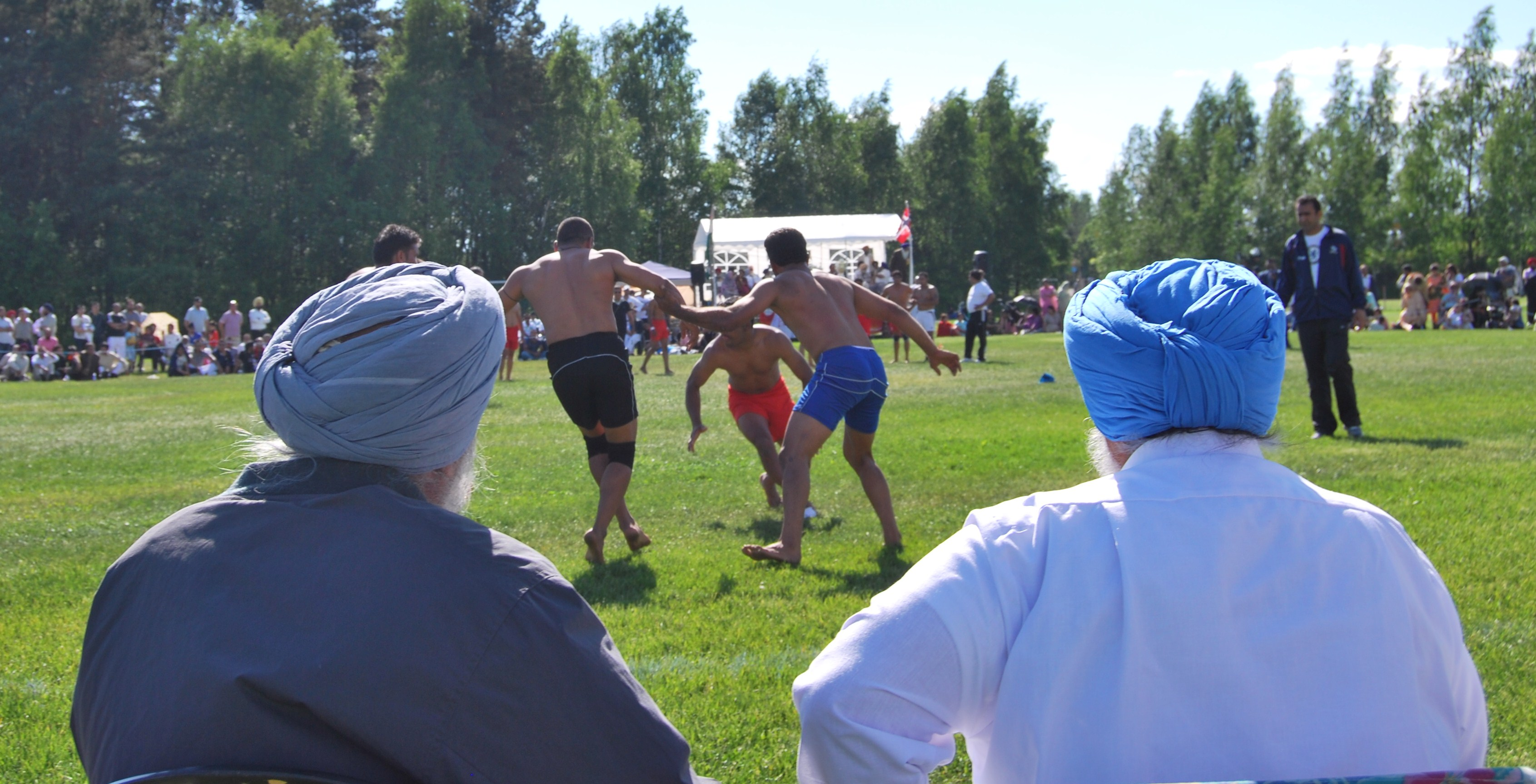
Circle Style Kabaddi

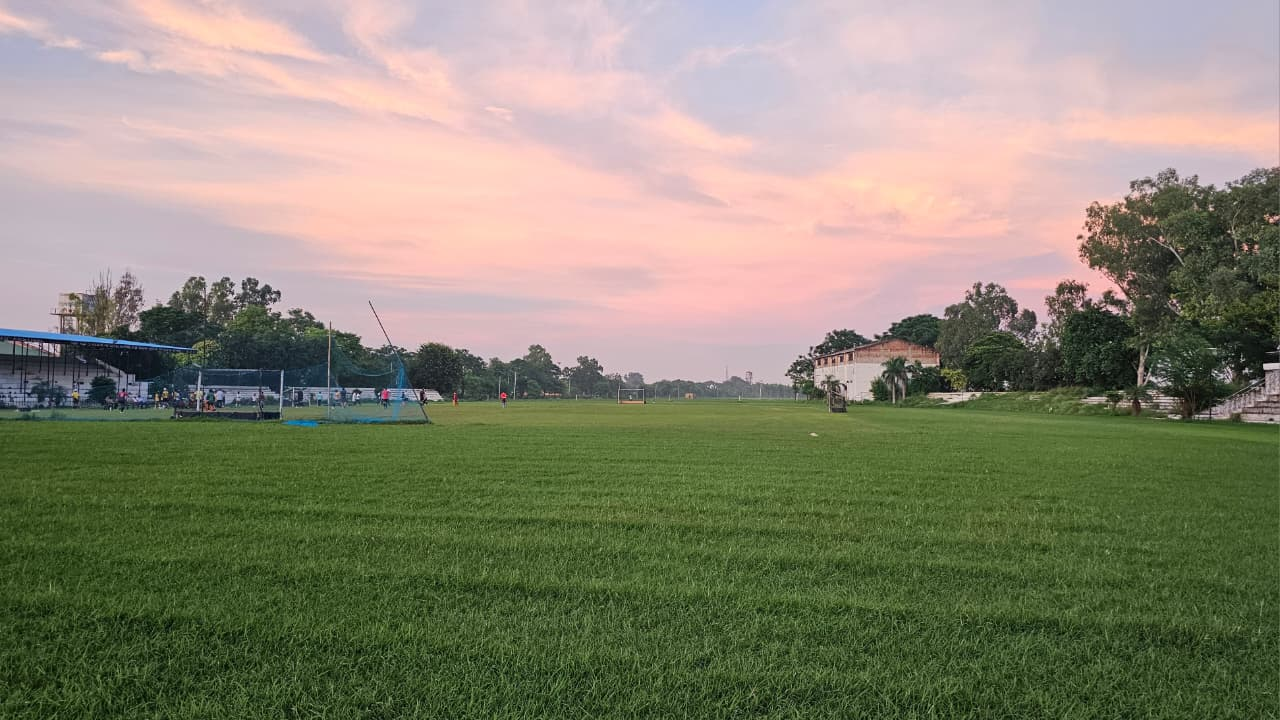
Kila Raipur Sports Stadium

Circle Style Kabaddi, a team contact sport originated in rural Punjab is recognised as the state game. Field hockey is also a popular sport in the state. Kila Raipur Sports Festival, popularly known as the Rural Olympics, is held annually in Kila Raipur (near Ludhiana). Competition is held for major Punjabi rural sports, include cart-race, rope pulling. Punjab government organises World Kabaddi League,

Punjab Games and annual Kabaddi World Cup for Circle Style Kabaddi in which teams from countries like Argentina, Canada, Denmark, England, India, Iran, Kenya, Pakistan, Scotland, Sierra Leone, Spain and United States participated. A major C.B.S.E event C.B.S.E Cluster Athlectics also held in Punjab at Sant Baba Bhag Singh University.

The Punjab state basketball team won the National Basketball Championship on many occasions, most recently in 2019 and 2020.

== Tourism ==
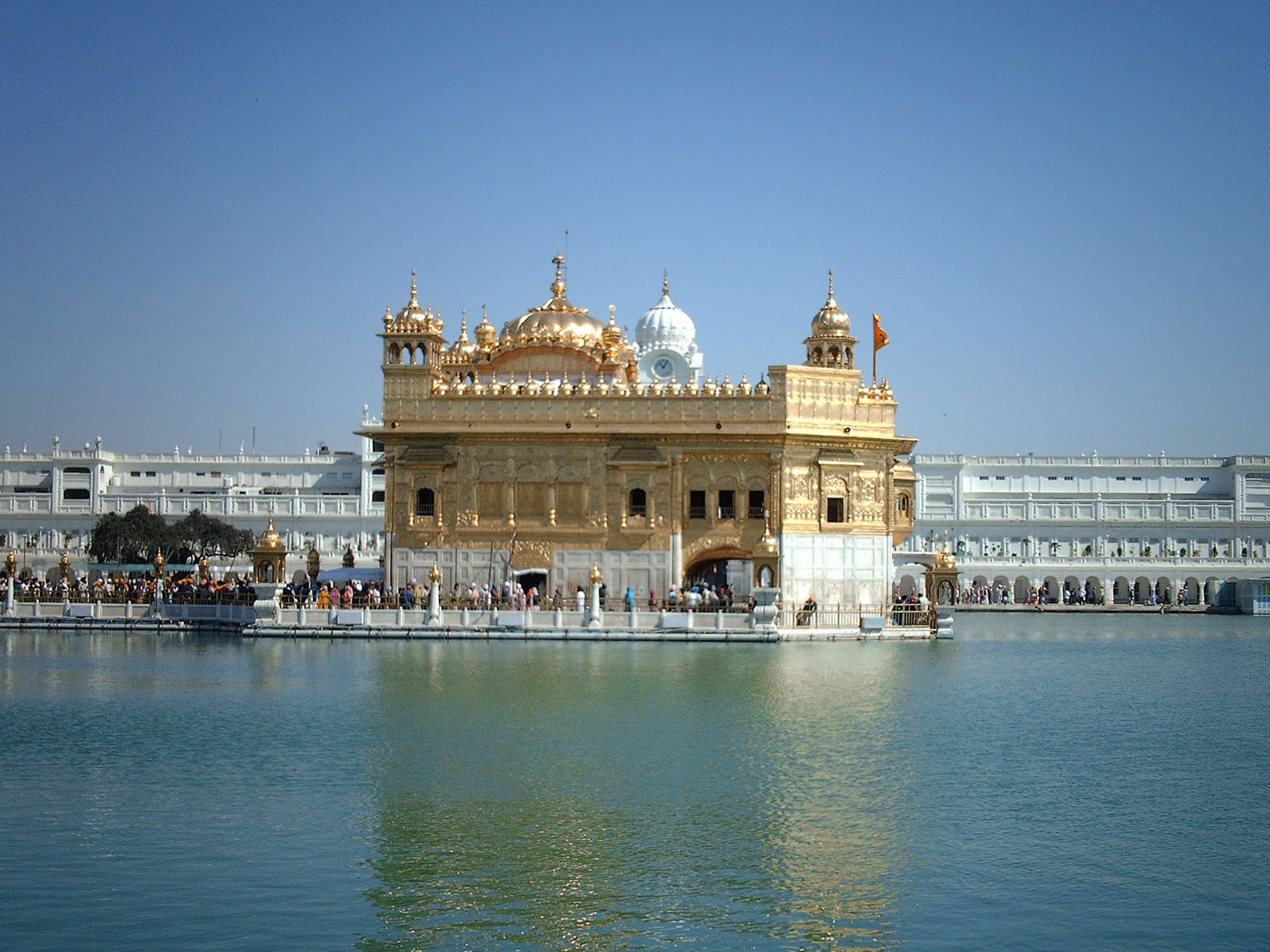
Harmandir Sahib in Amritsar is a major pilgrimage site in Punjab and is also widely visited for its unique architecture

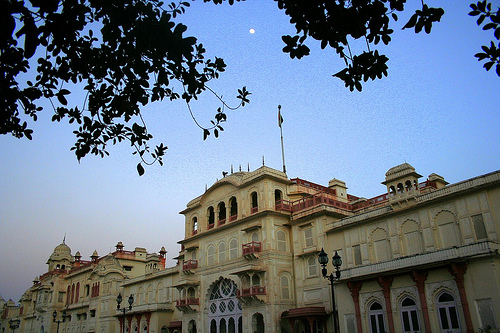
Moti Bagh Palace in Patiala

Partition Museum in Amritsar

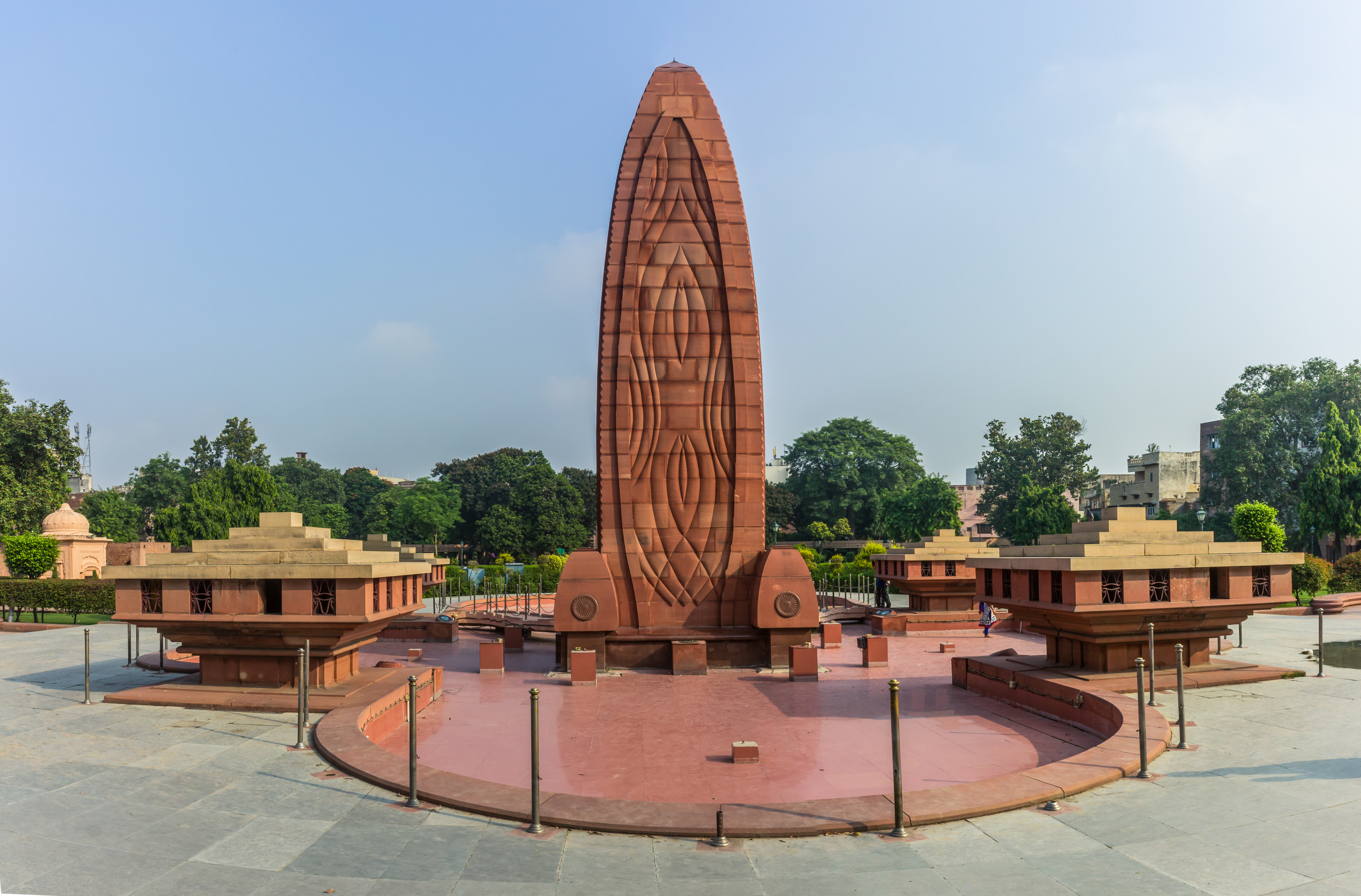
Jallianwala Bagh

Tourism in Indian Punjab centres around the historic palaces, battle sites, and the great Sikh architecture of the state and the surrounding region. Examples include various sites of the Indus Valley civilisation, the ancient fort of Bathinda, the architectural monuments of Kapurthala, Patiala, and Chandigarh, the modern capital designed by Le Corbusier.

The Golden Temple in Amritsar is one of the major tourist destinations of Punjab and indeed India, attracting more visitors than the Taj Mahal. Lonely Planet Bluelist 2008 has voted the Harmandir Sahib as one of the world's best spiritual sites. Moreover, there is a rapidly expanding array of international hotels in the holy city at Heritage Walk Amritsar that can be booked for overnight stays. Devi Talab Mandir is a Hindu temple located in Jalandhar. This temple is devoted to Goddess Durga and is believed to be at least 200 years old. Another main tourist destination is religious and historic city of Sri Anandpur Sahib where large number of

tourists come to see the Virasat-e-Khalsa (Khalsa Heritage Memorial Complex) and also take part in Hola Mohalla festival. Kila Raipur Sports Festival is also popular tourist attraction in Kila Raipur near Ludhiana. Shahpur kandi fort, Ranjit Sagar lake and Sikh Temple in Sri Muktsar Sahib are also popular attractions in Punjab. Punjab also has the world's first museum based on the Indian Partition of 1947, in Amritsar, called the Partition Museum.

== See also ==
- History of Punjab
- List of people from Punjab (India)
- Punjabi nationalism
- Greater Punjab Movement, India
- Sikh Light Infantry
- Punjab Regiment
- Sikh Regiment
- Punjabi culture
- Provinces of India (British)
- COVID-19 pandemic in Punjab, India
- Panjab Digital Library
- Madhopur, Punjab

== Bibliography ==
- Radhika Chopra. Militant and Migrant: The Politics and Social History of Punjab (2011)
- Harnik Deol. Religion and Nationalism in India: The Case of the Punjab (Routledge Studies in the Modern History of Asia) (2000)
- Harjinder Singh Dilgeer, Encyclopedia of Jalandhar, Sikh University Press, Brussels, Belgium (2005)
- Harjinder Singh Dilgeer, SIKH HISTORY in 10 volumes, Sikh University Press, Brussels, Belgium (2010–11)
- J. S. Grewal. The Sikhs of the Punjab (The New Cambridge History of India) (1998)
- J. S. Grewal. Social and Cultural History of the Punjab: Prehistoric, Ancient and Early Medieval (2004)
- Nazer Singh. Delhi and Punjab: Essays in history and historiography (1995)
- Tai Yong Tan. The Garrison State: Military, Government and Society in Colonial Punjab, 1849–1947 (Sage Series in Modern Indian History) (2005)
- J. C. Aggarwal and S. P. Agrawal, eds. Modern History of Punjab: Relevant Select Documents (1992)
- R. M. Chopra, The Legacy of The Punjab, 1997, Punjabee Bradree, Calcutta.
- Zuhair Kashmeri; Brian McAndrew (6 September 2005), Soft Target: The Real Story Behind the Air India Disaster – Second Edition, James Lorimer & Company, ISBN 978-1-55-028904-6
- India. Census Commissioner (1941). Punjab (Report). Census of India, 1941. Vol. VI. Delhi. JSTOR saoa.crl.28215541.
