= Chamrour =

- Village
- Location in Punjab, India Chamrour (India)
- Coordinates: 32.4442056°N 75.7787654°E
- Country: India
- State: Punjab
- District: Pathankot
- Tehsil: Dhar Kalan

Government
  - Type: Panchayat raj
  - Body: Gram panchayat

Area
  - Total: 169 ha (420 acres)
- Elevation: 524 m (1,719 ft)

Population (2011)
  - Total: 139
  - Density: 82.2/km^{2} (213/sq mi)
  - Total Households: 27
- Sex ratio 80/59 ♂/♀

Languages
  - Official: Punjabi
- Time zone: UTC+5:30 (IST)
- PIN: 145022
- Telephone: 01870
- ISO 3166 code: IN-PB
- Vehicle registration: PB-06
- Website: gurdaspur.nic.in

Chamrour is a village in Dhar Kalan in Gurdaspur district of Punjab State, India. It is located 5 kilometres (3.1 mi) from sub district headquarter, 6 kilometres (3.7 mi) from Pathankot, 73 kilometres (45 mi) from district headquarter and 317 kilometres (197 mi) from state capital Chandigarh. The village is administrated by Sarpanch an elected representative of the village.

== Demography ==
As of 2011, the village has a total number of 27 houses and a population of 139 of which 80 are males while 59 are females according to the report published by Census India in 2011. The literacy rate of the village is 79.67%, highest than the state average of 75.84%. The population of children under the age of 6 years is 16 which is 11.51% of total population of the village, and child sex ratio is approximately 600 lower than the state average of 846.

As per census 2011, 44 people were engaged in work activities out of the total population of the village which includes 43 males and 1 females. According to census survey report 2011, 88.64% workers describe their work as main work and 11.36% workers are involved in marginal activity providing the livelihood for less than 6 months.

== Transport ==
The nearest train station is located 50 kilometres (31 mi) away in Dalhousie road and Sri Guru Ram Dass Jee International Airport is 186 kilometres (116 mi) away from the village.

== See also ==
- List of villages in India
