= Dhar Khurd =

- Village
- Location in Punjab, India Dhar Khurd (India)
- Coordinates: 32.4250488°N 75.8094853°E
- Country: India
- State: Punjab
- District: Pathankot
- Tehsil: Dhar Kalan

Government
  - Type: Panchayat raj
  - Body: Gram panchayat

Area
  - Total: 403 ha (1,000 acres)
- Elevation: 524 m (1,719 ft)

Population (2011)
  - Total: 651
  - Density: 162/km^{2} (418/sq mi)
  - Total Households: 141
- Sex ratio 338/313 ♂/♀

Languages
  - Official: Punjabi, Hindi
- Time zone: UTC+5:30 (IST)
- PIN: 145022
- Telephone: 01870
- ISO 3166 code: IN-PB
- Vehicle registration: PB-06
- Website: pathankot.nic.in

Dhar Khurd is a village in Dhar Kalan tehsil in Pathankot district of Indian State of Punjab. It is located 38 kilometres (24 mi) from Pathankot City, district headquarter and 266 kilometres (165 mi) from state capital Chandigarh. The village is administrated by Sarpanch an elected representative of the village.

== Demography ==
As of 2011, the village has a total number of 141 houses and a population of 651 of which 338 are males while 313 are females according to the report published by Census India in 2011. The literacy rate of the village is 82.97%, highest than the state average of 75.84%. The population of children under the age of 6 years is 52 which is 7.99% of total population of the village, and child sex ratio is approximately 926 highest than the state average of 846.

Most of the people are from Schedule Caste which constitutes 31.18% of total population in the village. The town does not have any Schedule Tribe population so far.

As per census 2011, 166 people were engaged in work activities out of the total population of the village which includes 158 males and 8 females. According to census survey report 2011, 24.10% workers describe their work as main work and 75.90% workers are involved in marginal activity providing the livelihood for less than 6 months.

== Transport ==
The nearest train station is located 25 kilometres (16 mi) away in Dalhousie road railway station but main junction is Pathankot Junction railway station is about 36 km from it and Pathankot Airport is 40 km from village and Sri Guru Ram Dass Jee International Airport is 161 kilometres (100 mi) away from the village.

== See also ==
- List of villages in India
