= Narianpur =

- Village
- Location in Punjab, India Narianpur (India)
- Coordinates: 31.9960299°N 75.5160426°E
- Country: India
- State: Punjab
- District: Pathankot
- Tehsil: Dhar Kalan

Government
  - Type: Panchayat raj
  - Body: Gram panchayat

Area
  - Total: 786 ha (1,940 acres)
- Elevation: 524 m (1,719 ft)

Population (2011)
  - Total: 990
  - Density: 130/km^{2} (330/sq mi)
  - Total Households: 208
- Sex ratio 521/469 ♂/♀

Languages
  - Official: Punjabi, Hindi
- Time zone: UTC+5:30 (IST)
- PIN: 145022
- Telephone: 01870
- ISO 3166 code: IN-PB
- Vehicle registration: PB-06
- Website: pathankot.nic.in

Narianpur is a village in Dhar Kalan tehsil in Pathankot district of Indian state of Punjab. It is located 12 kilometres (7.5 mi) from Pathankot City, district headquarter and 205 kilometres (127 mi) from state capital Chandigarh. The village is administrated by Sarpanch an elected representative of the village.

== Demography ==
As of 2011, the village has a total number of 208 houses and a population of 990 of which 521 are males while 469 are females according to the report published by Census India in 2011. The literacy rate of the village is 76.50%, highest than the state average of 75.84%. The population of children under the age of 6 years is 126 which is 12.73% of total population of the village, and child sex ratio is approximately 881 higher than the state average of 846.

Most of the people are from Schedule Caste which constitutes 17.27% of total population in the village. The town does not have any Schedule Tribe population so far.

As per census 2011, 284 people were engaged in work activities out of the total population of the village which includes 262 males and 22 females. According to census survey report 2011, 98.94% workers describe their work as main work and 1.06% workers are involved in marginal activity providing the livelihood for less than 6 months.

== Transport ==
The nearest train station is located 55 kilometres (34 mi) away in Dalhousie road and Sri Guru Ram Dass Jee International Airport is 98 kilometres (61 mi) away from the village.

== See also ==
- List of villages in India
