= Sarti, Gurdaspur =

Sarti
- Village
- Location in Punjab, India Sarti (India)
- Coordinates: 32.4765537°N 75.8028153°E
- Country: India
- State: Punjab
- District: Pathankot
- Tehsil: Dhar Kalan

Government
  - Type: Panchayat raj
  - Body: Gram panchayat

Area
  - Total: 1,295 ha (3,200 acres)
- Elevation: 524 m (1,719 ft)

Population (2011)
  - Total: 3,960
  - Density: 306/km^{2} (792/sq mi)
  - Total Households: 79
- Sex ratio 2023/1937 ♂/♀

Languages
  - Official: Punjabi, Hindi, Dogri
- Time zone: UTC+5:30 (IST)
- PIN: 145022
- Telephone: 01870
- ISO 3166 code: IN-PB
- Vehicle registration: PB-06
- Website: pathankot.nic.in

Sarti is a village in Dhar Kalan tehsil in Pathankot district of Indian state of Punjab. It is located 10 kilometres (6.2 mi) from Pathankot City, district headquarter and 285 kilometres (177 mi) from state capital Chandigarh. The village is administrated by Sarpanch an elected representative of the village.

== Demography ==
As of 2011, the village has a total number of 769 houses and a population of 3960 of which 2023 are males while 1937 are females according to the report published by Census India in 2011. The literacy rate of the village is 76%, highest than the state average of 75.84%. The population of children under the age of 6 years is 498 which is 12.58% of total population of the village, and child sex ratio is approximately 957 highest than the state average of 846.

Most of the people are from Schedule Caste which constitutes 31.29% of total population in the village. The town does not have any Schedule Tribe population so far.

As per census 2011, 1473 people were engaged in work activities out of the total population of the village which includes 1086 males and 387 females. According to census survey report 2011, 51.19% workers describe their work as main work and 48.81% workers are involved in marginal activity providing the livelihood for less than 6 months.

== Transport ==
The nearest train station is located 44 kilometres (27 mi) away in Dalhousie road and Sri Guru Ram Dass Jee International Airport is 180 kilometres (110 mi) away from the village.

== See also ==
- List of villages in India
