= Tarhari =

- Village
- Location in Punjab, India Tarhari (India)
- Coordinates: 32.3724701°N 75.7043204°E
- Country: India
- State: Punjab
- District: Pathankot
- Tehsil: Dhar Kalan

Government
  - Type: Panchayat raj
  - Body: Gram panchayat

Area
  - Total: 2,821 ha (6,970 acres)
- Elevation: 524 m (1,719 ft)

Population (2011)
  - Total: 6,871
  - Density: 243.6/km^{2} (630.8/sq mi)
  - Total Households: 1,409
- Sex ratio 3564/3307 ♂/♀

Languages
  - Official: Punjabi
- Time zone: UTC+5:30 (IST)
- PIN: 145022
- Telephone: 01870
- ISO 3166 code: IN-PB
- Vehicle registration: PB-06
- Website: gurdaspur.nic.in

Tarhari is a village in Dhar Kalan in Pathankot district and previously was in Gurdaspur district of Punjab State, India. It is located 25 kilometres (16 mi) from sub district headquarter, 10 kilometres (6.2 mi) from Pathankot, 55 kilometres (34 mi) from district headquarter and 254 kilometres (158 mi) from state capital Chandigarh. The village is administrated by Sarpanch an elected representative of the village.

== Demography ==
As of 2011, the village has a total number of 1409 houses and a population of 6871, of which 3564 are males while 3307 are females, according to the report published by Census India in 2011. The literacy rate of the village is 81.89%, highest than the state average of 75.84%. The population of children under the age of 6 years is 840, which is 12.23% of total population of the village, and child sex ratio is approximately 787 lower than the state average of 846.

Most of the people are from Schedule Caste which constitutes 19.34% of total population in the village. The town does not have any Schedule Tribe population so far.

As per census 2011, 1893 people were engaged in work activities out of the total population of the village which includes 1748 males and 145 females. According to census survey report 2011, 76.76% workers describe their work as main work and 23.24% workers are involved in marginal activity providing the livelihood for less than 6 months.

== Transport ==
The nearest train station is located 13 kilometres (8.1 mi) away in Dalhousie road and Sri Guru Ram Dass Jee International Airport is 141 kilometres (88 mi) away from the village.

== See also ==
- List of villages in India
