= Phangota =

- Village
- Location in Punjab, India Phangota (India)
- Coordinates: 32.4598887°N 75.7819654°E
- Country: India
- State: Punjab
- District: Pathankot
- Tehsil: Dhar Kalan

Government
  - Type: Panchayat raj
  - Body: Gram panchayat

Area
  - Total: 1,040 ha (2,600 acres)
- Elevation: 524 m (1,719 ft)

Population (2011)
  - Total: 1,140
  - Density: 110/km^{2} (284/sq mi)
  - Total Households: 202
- Sex ratio 588/552 ♂/♀

Languages
  - Official: Punjabi
- Time zone: UTC+5:30 (IST)
- PIN: 145022
- Telephone: 01870
- ISO 3166 code: IN-PB
- Vehicle registration: PB-68
- Website: gurdaspur.nic.in

Phangota is a village in Dhar Kalan in Pathankot district of Punjab State, India. It is located 28 kilometres (17 mi) from sub district headquarter, 59 kilometres (37 mi) from Pathankot, 72 kilometres (45 mi) from district headquarter and 287 kilometres (178 mi) from state capital Chandigarh. The village is administrated by Sarpanch an elected representative of the village.

== Demography ==
As of 2011, the village has a total number of 202 houses and a population of 1140 of which 558 are males while 552 are females according to the report published by Census India in 2011. The literacy rate of the village is 71.89%, lower than the state average of 75.84%. The population of children under the age of 6 years is 158 which is 13.86% of total population of the village, and child sex ratio is approximately 10.26 highest than the state average of 846.

Most of the people are from Schedule Caste which constitutes 16.14% of total population in the village. The town does not have any Schedule Tribe population so far.

As per census 2011, 324 people were engaged in work activities out of the total population of the village which includes 205 males and 19 females. According to census survey report 2011, 63.89% workers describe their work as main work and 36.11% workers are involved in marginal activity providing the livelihood for less than 6 months.

== See also ==
- List of villages in India
