= Nalloh =

- Village
- Location in Punjab, India Nalloh (India)
- Coordinates: 32.4401238°N 75.8180704°E
- Country: India
- State: Punjab
- District: Pathankot
- Tehsil: Dhar Kalan

Government
  - Type: Panchayat raj
  - Body: Gram panchayat

Area
  - Total: 1,014 ha (2,510 acres)
- Elevation: 524 m (1,719 ft)

Population (2011)
  - Total: 2,233
  - Density: 220.2/km^{2} (570.4/sq mi)
  - Total Households: 382
- Sex ratio 1154/1179 ♂/♀

Languages
  - Official: Punjabi, Hindi
- Time zone: UTC+5:30 (IST)
- PIN: 145022
- Telephone: 01870
- ISO 3166 code: IN-PB
- Vehicle registration: PB-68
- Website: pathankot.nic.in

Nalloh is a village in Dhar Kalan tehsil in Pathankot district of Indian state of Punjab. It is located 41.5 kilometres (25.8 mi) from Pathankot City, the district headquarters and 272 kilometres (169 mi) from state capital Chandigarh. The village is administrated by Sarpanch an elected representative of the village.

== Demography ==
As of 2011, the village has a total number of 382 houses and a population of 2233 of which 1154 are males while 1179 are females according to the report published by Census India in 2011. The literacy rate of the village is 77.53%, highest than the state average of 75.84%. The population of children under the age of 6 years is 315 which is 14.11% of total population of the village, and child sex ratio is approximately 921 highest than the state average of 846.

Most of the people are from Schedule Caste which constitutes 28.53% of total population in the village. The town does not have any Schedule Tribe population so far.

As per census 2011, 574 people were engaged in work activities out of the total population of the village which includes 481 males and 93 females. According to census survey report 2011, 77.35% workers describe their work as main work and 22.65% workers are involved in marginal activity providing the livelihood for less than 6 months.

== Transport ==
The nearest train station is located 41 kilometres (25 mi) away in Pathankot and Sri Guru Ram Dass Jee International Airport is 167 kilometres (104 mi) away from the village.

== See also ==
- List of villages in India
