= Hara, Gurdaspur =

Hara
- Village
- Location in Punjab, India Hara (India)
- Coordinates: 32.3671552°N 75.7407304°E
- Country: India
- State: Punjab
- District: Pathankot
- Tehsil: Dhar Kalan

Government
  - Type: Panchayat raj
  - Body: Gram panchayat

Area
  - Total: 3,722 ha (9,200 acres)
- Elevation: 524 m (1,719 ft)

Population (2011)
  - Total: 6,800
  - Density: 180/km^{2} (470/sq mi)
  - Total Households: 1,256
- Sex ratio 3686/3114 ♂/♀

Languages
  - Official: Punjabi
- Time zone: UTC+5:30 (IST)
- PIN: 145022
- Telephone: 01870
- ISO 3166 code: IN-PB
- Vehicle registration: PB-06
- Website: gurdaspur.nic.in

Hara is a village in Dhar Kalan in Pathankot district previously was in Gurdaspur district of Punjab State, India. It is located 30 kilometres (19 mi) from sub district headquarter, 13 kilometres (8.1 mi) from Pathankot, 60 kilometres (37 mi) from district headquarter and 253 kilometres (157 mi) from state capital Chandigarh. The village is administrated by Sarpanch an elected representative of the village.

== Demography ==
As of 2011, the village has a total number of 1256 houses and a population of 6800 of which 3686 are males while 3114 are females according to the report published by Census India in 2011. The literacy rate of the village is 83.52%, highest than the state average of 75.84%. The population of children under the age of 6 years is 761 which is 11.19% of total population of the village, and child sex ratio is approximately 834 higher than the state average of 846.

Most of the people are from Schedule Caste which constitutes 14.18% of total population in the village. The town does not have any Schedule Tribe population so far.

As per census 2011, 1958 people were engaged in work activities out of the total population of the village which includes 1691 males and 267 females. According to census survey report 2011, 90.30% workers describe their work as main work and 9.70% workers are involved in marginal activity providing the livelihood for less than 6 months.

== Transport ==
The nearest train station is located 12 kilometres (7.5 mi) away in Dalhousie road and Sri Guru Ram Dass Jee International Airport is 148 kilometres (92 mi) away from the village.

== See also ==
- List of villages in India
