= Darbahn =

- Village
- Location in Punjab, India Darbahn (India)
- Coordinates: 32.4953588°N 75.8235504°E
- Country: India
- State: Punjab
- District: Pathankot
- Tehsil: Dhar Kalan

Government
  - Type: Panchayat raj
  - Body: Gram panchayat

Area
  - Total: 534 ha (1,320 acres)

Population (2011)
  - Total: 527
  - Density: 98.7/km^{2} (256/sq mi)
  - Total Households: 103
- Sex ratio 282/245 ♂/♀

Languages
  - Official: Punjabi, Hindi
- Time zone: UTC+5:30 (IST)
- ISO 3166 code: IN-PB
- Vehicle registration: PB-06
- Post office: 145022
- Website: pathankot.nic.in

Darbahn is a village in Dhar Kalan tehsil in Pathankot district of Indian state of Punjab. It is located 14 kilometres (8.7 mi) from Pathankot City, the district headquarter and 284 kilometres (176 mi) from state capital Chandigarh. The village is administrated by Sarpanch an elected representative of the village.

== Demography ==
As of 2011, the village has a total number of 103 houses and a population of 527 of which 282 are males while 245 are females according to the report published by Census India in 2011. The literacy rate of the village is 67.70%, lower than the state average of 75.84%. The population of children under the age of 6 years is 75 which is 14.23% of total population of the village, and child sex ratio is approximately 870 lower than the state average of 846.

Most of the people are from Schedule Caste which constitutes 24.10% of total population in the village. The town does not have any Schedule Tribe population so far.

As per census 2011, 322 people were engaged in work activities out of the total population of the village which includes 178 males and 124 females. According to census survey report 2011, 76.71% workers describe their work as main work and 23.29% workers are involved in marginal activity providing the livelihood for less than 6 months.

== Transport ==
The nearest train station is located 44 kilometres (27 mi) away in Dalhousie road and Sri Guru Ram Dass Jee International Airport is 179 kilometres (111 mi) away from the village.

== See also ==
- List of villages in India
