= Jalahar =

- Village
- Location in Punjab, India Jalahar (India)
- Coordinates: 32.4071687°N 75.8081554°E
- Country: India
- State: Punjab
- District: Gurdaspur
- Tehsil: Dhar Kalan

Government
  - Type: Panchayat raj
  - Body: Gram panchayat

Area
  - Total: 157 ha (390 acres)
- Elevation: 524 m (1,719 ft)

Population (2011)
  - Total: 487
  - Density: 310/km^{2} (803/sq mi)
  - Total Households: 107
- Sex ratio 256/231 ♂/♀

Languages
  - Official: Punjabi
- Time zone: UTC+5:30 (IST)
- PIN: 145022
- Telephone: 01870
- ISO 3166 code: IN-PB
- Vehicle registration: PB-06
- Website: gurdaspur.nic.in

Jalahar is a village in Dhar Kalan in Gurdaspur district of Punjab State, India. It is located 4 kilometres (2.5 mi) from sub district headquarter, 2 kilometres (1.2 mi) from Pathankot, 72 kilometres (45 mi) from district headquarter and 264 kilometres (164 mi) from state capital Chandigarh. The village is administrated by Sarpanch an elected representative of the village.

== Demography ==
As of 2011, the village has a total number of 107 houses and a population of 487 of which 256 are males while 231 are females according to the report published by Census India in 2011. The literacy rate of the village is 86.48%, highest than the state average of 75.84%. The population of children under the age of 6 years is 58 which is 11.91% of total population of the village, and child sex ratio is approximately 1231 higher than the state average of 846.

Most of the people are from Schedule Caste which constitutes 6.57% of total population in the village. The town does not have any Schedule Tribe population so far.

As per census 2011, 144 people were engaged in work activities out of the total population of the village which includes 99 males and 45 females. According to census survey report 2011, 62.50% workers describe their work as main work and 37.50% workers are involved in marginal activity providing the livelihood for less than 6 months.

== Transport ==
The nearest train station is located 23 kilometres (14 mi) away in Dalhousie road and Sri Guru Ram Dass Jee International Airport is 158 kilometres (98 mi) away from the village.

== See also ==
- List of villages in India
