= Faugli Mawa =

Coordinates: 31°11′45.96″N 76°27′48.22″E

- Village
- Interactive map of Faugli Mawa
- Country: India
- State: Punjab
- District: Gurdaspur
- Tehsil: Dhar Kalan

Government
  - Type: Panchayat raj
  - Body: Gram panchayat

Area
  - Total: 540 ha (1,300 acres)
- Elevation: 524 m (1,719 ft)

Population (2011)
  - Total: 430
  - Density: 80/km^{2} (210/sq mi)
  - Total Households: 94
- Sex ratio 221/209 ♂/♀

Languages
  - Official: Punjabi
- Time zone: UTC+5:30 (IST)
- PIN: 145022
- Telephone: 01870
- ISO 3166 code: IN-PB
- Vehicle registration: PB-06
- Website: gurdaspur.nic.in

Faugli Mawa is a village in Dhar Kalan in Gurdaspur district of Punjab State, India. It is located 5 kilometres (3.1 mi) from sub district headquarter, 5 kilometres (3.1 mi) from Pathankot and 73 kilometres (45 mi). The village is administrated by Sarpanch an elected representative of the village.

== Demography ==
As of 2011, the village has a total number of 94 houses and a population of 430 of which 221 are males while 209 are females according to the report published by Census India in 2011. The literacy rate of the village is 82.47% highest than the state average of 75.84%. The population of children under the age of 6 years is 65 which is 15.12% of total population of the village and child sex ratio is approximately 857 highest than the state average of 846.

Most of the people are from Schedule Caste which constitutes 33.49% of total population in the village. The town does not have any Schedule Tribe population so far.

As per census 2011, 117 people were engaged in work activities out of the total population of the village which includes 109 males and 8 females. According to census survey report 2011, 84.62% workers describe their work as main work and 15.38% workers are involved in marginal activity providing the livelihood for less than 6 months.

== See also ==
- List of villages in India
