= Sujanpur (disambiguation) =

Sujanpur is a city and municipal council in the Pathankot district of the Indian state of Punjab.

Sujanpur may also refer to:

- Tira Sujanpur, a town and municipal council in Hamirpur, Himachal Pradesh, India
- Sujanpur, Himachal Pradesh Assembly constituency
- Sujanpur, Punjab Assembly constituency
