= Naresh Puri =

Indian politician

Naresh Puri (born 1970) is an Indian politician from Punjab. He is an MLA from Sujanpur Assembly constituency in Pathankot District. He won the 2022 Punjab Legislative Assembly election, representing the Indian National Congress.

== Early life and education ==
Puri is from Sujanpur, Pathankot district, Punjab. He is the son of late Raghunath Sahai Puri. He completed his B.Sc. in 1989 at S.R.P.A.A.B. College, Pathankot which is affiliated with Guru Nanak Dev University, Amritsar.

== Career ==
Puri won from Sujanpur Assembly constituency representing the Indian National Congress in the 2022 Punjab Legislative Assembly election. He polled 46,916 votes and defeated his nearest rival, Dinesh Singh of the Bharatiya Janata Party, by a margin of 4,636 votes. In the 2012 Punjab Legislative Assembly election, he lost as an independent candidate to Dinesh Sigh of BJP by a margin of 23,096 votes.
