= Joginder Pal =

Indian politician from Punjab

Member of the Punjab Legislative Assembly
- In office 2017–2022
- Preceded by: Seema Kumari
- Succeeded by: Lal Chand Kataruchakk
- Constituency: Bhoa

Personal details
- Born: 2 April 1964 (age 62) Sujanpur
- Party: INC
- Profession: Politician

Joginder Pal (born 2 April 1964) is an Indian politician and a member of INC. In 2017, he was elected as the member of the Punjab Legislative Assembly from Bhoa. In 2022 assembly election, he lost to Lal Chand Kataruchakk of Aam Aadmi Party by a short voter margin.

== Constituency ==
Pal represented the Bhoa from 2017 to 2022. Pal won the Bhoa on an INC ticket beating the sitting MLA of the Punjab Legislative Assembly Seema Kumari of the BJP by over 27496 votes.

== Political party ==
Pal is from the Indian National Congress and he is the former MLA of Bhoa Assembly constituency.

== Electoral performance ==
Punjab Assembly election, 2022: Bhoa
Party	Candidate	Votes	%	±%
AAP	Lal Chand Kataruchakk	50,339	36.59	▲33.71
INC	Joginder Pal	49,135	35.72	▼14.43
BJP	Seema Kumari	29,132	21.18	▼9.72
BSP	Rakesh Kumar Majotara	5,046	3.67	▲3.14
NOTA	None of the above	749	0.54	▲0.19
Majority		1,204	0.87	
Turnout		137572		
Registered electors		182,915		
AAP gain from INC				

Punjab Assembly election, 2017: Bhoa
Party	Candidate	Votes	%	±%
INC	Joginder Pal	67,865	51.95	▲16.60
BJP	Seema Kumari	40,369	30.90	▼15.64
RMPI	Lal Chand Kataru Chak	13,353	10.22	new
AAP	Amarjeet Singh	3,767	2.88	new
NOTA	None of the above	454	0.35	−−
Majority		27,496	20.97	
Turnout		131,091	75.20	▲3.88
Registered electors		174,313		
INC gain from BJP		Swing		
