= Lohrun =

Lehroon
- Village
- Location in Punjab, India Lehroon (India)
- Coordinates: 32.4143°N 75.8879°E
- Country: India
- State: Punjab
- District: Gurdaspur
- Tehsil: Dhar Kalan

Government
  - Type: Panchayat raj
  - Body: Gram panchayat

Area
  - Total: 984 ha (2,430 acres)
- Elevation: 418 m (1,371 ft)

Population (2011)
  - Total: 2,047
  - Density: 208/km^{2} (539/sq mi)
  - Total Households: 207
- Sex ratio 980/1067 ♂/♀

Languages
  - Official: Punjabi
- Time zone: UTC+5:30 (IST)
- PIN: 145022
- Telephone: 01870
- ISO 3166 code: IN-PB
- Vehicle registration: PB-06
- Website: gurdaspur.nic.in

Lehroon is a village in Dhar Kalan in Gurdaspur district of Punjab State, India. It is located 29 kilometres (18 mi) from sub district headquarter, 11 kilometres (6.8 mi) from Pathankot, 97 kilometres (60 mi) from district headquarter and 281 kilometres (175 mi) from state capital Chandigarh. The village is administrated by Sarpanch an elected representative of the village.

== Demography ==
As of 2011, the village has a total number of 418 houses and a population of 2047 of which 980 are males while 1067 are females according to the report published by Census India in 2011. The literacy rate of the village is 79.28%, highest than the state average of 75.84%. The population of children under the age of 6 years is 281 which is 13.73% of total population of the village, and child sex ratio is approximately 873 higher than the state average of 846.

Most of the people are from Schedule Caste which constitutes 10.85% of total population in the village. The town does not have any Schedule Tribe population so far.

As per census 2011, 554 people were engaged in work activities out of the total population of the village which includes 463 males and 91 females. According to census survey report 2011, 64.98% workers describe their work as main work and 35.02% workers are involved in marginal activity providing the livelihood for less than 6 months.

== Transport ==
The nearest train station is located 38 kilometres (24 mi) away in Dalhousie road and Sri Guru Ram Dass Jee International Airport is 176 kilometres (109 mi) away from the village.

== See also ==
- List of villages in India
