= Barsudhal =

- Village
- Location in Punjab, India Barsudhal (India)
- Coordinates: 32.4600638°N 75.8297803°E
- Country: India
- State: Punjab
- District: Gurdaspur
- Tehsil: Dhar Kalan

Government
  - Type: Panchayat raj
  - Body: Gram panchayat

Area
  - Total: 647 ha (1,600 acres)
- Elevation: 524 m (1,719 ft)

Population (2011)
  - Total: 780
  - Density: 120/km^{2} (310/sq mi)
  - Total Households: 167
- Sex ratio 337/403 ♂/♀

Languages
  - Official: Punjabi
- Time zone: UTC+5:30 (IST)
- PIN: 145022
- Telephone: 01870
- ISO 3166 code: IN-PB
- Vehicle registration: PB-06
- Website: gurdaspur.nic.in

Barsudhal is a village in Dhar Kalan in Gurdaspur district of Punjab State, India. It is located 24 kilometres (15 mi) from sub district headquarter, 10 kilometres (6.2 mi) from Pathankot, 85 kilometres (53 mi) from district headquarter and 292 kilometres (181 mi) from state capital Chandigarh. The village is administrated by Sarpanch an elected representative of the village.

== Demography ==
As of 2011, the village has a total number of 167 houses and a population of 780 of which 337 are males and 403 are females according to the report published by Census India in 2011. The literacy rate of the village is 79.89%, higher than the state average of 75.84%. The population of children under the age of 6 years is 84 which is 10.77% of total population of the village, and child sex ratio is approximately 1000, higher than the state average of 846.

Most of the people are from Schedule Caste which constitutes 16.28% of total population in the village. The town does not have any Schedule Tribe population so far.

As per census 2011, 253 people were engaged in work activities out of the total population of the village which includes 198 males and 55 females. According to census survey report 2011, 65.61% workers describe their work as main work and 34.39% workers are involved in marginal activity providing the livelihood for less than 6 months.

== Transport ==
The nearest train station is located 51 kilometres (32 mi) away in Dalhousie road and Sri Guru Ram Dass Jee International Airport is 187 kilometres (116 mi) away from the village.

== See also ==
- List of villages in India
