= Dukhan Iyali =

- Village
- Location in Punjab, India Dukhan Iyali (India)
- Coordinates: 32.4756438°N 75.8376553°E
- Country: India
- State: Punjab
- District: Gurdaspur
- Tehsil: Dhar Kalan

Government
  - Type: Panchayat raj
  - Body: Gram panchayat

Area
  - Total: 416 ha (1,030 acres)
- Elevation: 524 m (1,719 ft)

Population (2011)
  - Total: 664
  - Density: 160/km^{2} (413/sq mi)
  - Total Households: 126
- Sex ratio 332/332 ♂/♀

Languages
  - Official: Punjabi
- Time zone: UTC+5:30 (IST)
- PIN: 145022
- Telephone: 01870
- ISO 3166 code: IN-PB
- Vehicle registration: PB-06
- Website: gurdaspur.nic.in

Dukhan Iyali is a village in Dhar Kalan in Gurdaspur district of Punjab State, India. It is located 24 kilometres (15 mi) from sub district headquarter, 13 kilometres (8.1 mi) from Pathankot, 92 kilometres (57 mi) from district headquarter and 280 kilometres (170 mi) from state capital Chandigarh. The village is administrated by Sarpanch an elected representative of the village.

== Demography ==
As of 2011, the village has a total number of 126 houses and a population of 664 of which 332 are males while 332 are females according to the report published by Census India in 2011. The literacy rate of the village is 77.84%, highest than the state average of 75.84%. The population of children under the age of 6 years is 100 which is 15.06% of total population of the village, and child sex ratio is approximately 724 lower than the state average of 846.

Most of the people are from Schedule Caste which constitutes 21.84% of total population in the village. The town does not have any Schedule Tribe population so far.

As per census 2011, 178 people were engaged in work activities out of the total population of the village which includes 161 males and 17 females. According to census survey report 2011, 96.63% workers describe their work as main work and 3.73% workers are involved in marginal activity providing the livelihood for less than 6 months.

== Transport ==
The nearest train station is located 37 kilometres (23 mi) away in Dalhousie road and Sri Guru Ram Dass Jee International Airport is 175 kilometres (109 mi) away from the village.

== See also ==
- List of villages in India
