= Musafir Ram Bhardwaj =

Musical artist (1930–2024)

- Born: 1930; Punjab States Agency, British India
- Died: 8 November 2024 (aged 94); Dunera, Pathankot district, Punjab, India
- Genres: Indian folk
- Occupation: Instrumentalist
- Instrument: Paun mata

Musafir Ram Bhardwaj (1930 – 8 November 2024) was an Indian paun mata musical instrument player from Himachal Pradesh. He was awarded the Padma Shri in 2014.

== Biography ==
Bhardwaj was born in 1930 to Deewana Ram at the village of Sunchai in the Bharmour area of the Chamba district, Himachal Pradesh, British India. He had no formal education. He learned to play the pauna mata from his father at the age of 13 and has played it ever since. He performed at the 2010 Commonwealth Games in Delhi.

Bhardwaj was also an agriculturist and tailor. He had four sons and two daughters. Bhardwaj died at his home in the village of Dunera, Punjab on 8 November 2024, at the age of 94.

=== Paun mata ===
Paun mata is a traditional musical instrument made of copper drums and lamb's skin. The Bhardwaj family plays the instrument, and they have been invited to social and religious ceremonies in Himachal Pradesh to play.

== Awards ==
- Padma Shri in 2014
- Lifetime Achievement Award 2013 by Divya Himachal
- Rashtrapati Award in 2009
