= Bakhatpur =

- Village
- Location in Punjab, India Bakhatpur (India)
- Coordinates: 31.9347147°N 75.3895502°E
- Country: India
- State: Punjab
- District: Gurdaspur
- Tehsil: Dhar Kalan

Government
  - Type: Panchayat raj
  - Body: Gram panchayat

Area
  - Total: 59 ha (150 acres)
- Elevation: 524 m (1,719 ft)

Population (2011)
  - Total: 101
  - Density: 170/km^{2} (440/sq mi)
  - Total Households: 21
- Sex ratio 53/48 ♂/♀

Languages
  - Official: Punjabi
- Time zone: UTC+5:30 (IST)
- PIN: 145022
- Telephone: 01870
- ISO 3166 code: IN-PB
- Vehicle registration: PB-06
- Website: gurdaspur.nic.in

Bakhatpur is a village in Dhar Kalan in Gurdaspur district of Punjab State, India. It is located 25 kilometres (16 mi) from the sub district headquarters, 10 kilometres (6.2 mi) from Pathankot, 93 kilometres (58 mi) from the district headquarters and 214 kilometres (133 mi) from the state capital Chandigarh. The village is administrated by a sarpanch, an elected representative of the village.

== Demography ==
In 2011, the village had 21 houses and a population of 101 (53 males and 48 females) according to the report published by Census India in 2011. The literacy rate was 91.11%, highest than the state average of 75.84%. The number of children under the age of 6 years was 10 (11.89% of the population) and the child sex ratio was approximately 1,200, higher than the state average of 846.

19 people were engaged in work activities, all male. According to the census, 89.47% of workers described their work as their main work and 10.53% were involved in a marginal activity providing a livelihood for less than 6 months.

== Transport ==
The nearest railway station is 63 kilometres (39 mi) away on the Dalhousie road. Sri Guru Ram Dass Jee International Airport is 78 kilometres (48 mi) from the village.

== See also ==
- List of villages in India
