= Bhamlada =

- Village
- Location in Punjab, India Bhamlada (India)
- Coordinates: 32.4436699°N 75.85139°E
- Country: India
- State: Punjab
- District: Gurdaspur
- Tehsil: Dhar Kalan

Government
  - Type: Panchayat raj
  - Body: Gram panchayat

Area
  - Total: 765 ha (1,890 acres)
- Elevation: 524 m (1,719 ft)

Population (2011)
  - Total: 1,887
  - Density: 247/km^{2} (639/sq mi)
  - Total Households: 376
- Sex ratio 1010/877 ♂/♀

Languages
  - Official: Punjabi
- Time zone: UTC+5:30 (IST)
- PIN: 145022
- Telephone: 01870
- ISO 3166 code: IN-PB
- Vehicle registration: PB-06
- Website: gurdaspur.nic.in

Bhamlada is a village in Dhar Kalan in Gurdaspur district of Punjab State, India. It is located 8 kilometres (5.0 mi) from sub district headquarter, 5 kilometres (3.1 mi) from Pathankot, 72 kilometres (45 mi) from district headquarter and 272 kilometres (169 mi) from state capital Chandigarh. The village is administrated by Sarpanch an elected representative of the village.

== Demography ==
As of 2011, the village has a total number of 376 houses and a population of 1887 of which 1010 are males while 877 are females according to the report published by Census India in 2011. The literacy rate of the village is 83.06%, highest than the state average of 75.84%. The population of children under the age of 6 years is 210 which is 11.13% of total population of the village, and child sex ratio is approximately 680 lower than the state average of 846.

Most of the people are from Schedule Caste which constitutes 12.67% of total population in the village. The town does not have any Schedule Tribe population so far.

As per census 2011, 542 people were engaged in work activities out of the total population of the village which includes 496 males and 46 females. According to census survey report 2011, 80.44% workers describe their work as main work and 19.56% workers are involved in marginal activity providing the livelihood for less than 6 months.

== Transport ==
The nearest train station is located 31 kilometres (19 mi) away in Dalhousie road and Sri Guru Ram Dass Jee International Airport is 166 kilometres (103 mi) away from the village.

== See also ==
- List of villages in India
