= Tureti =

- Village
- Location in Punjab, India Tureti (India)
- Coordinates: 32.3741047°N 75.6859049°E
- Country: India
- State: Punjab
- District: Gurdaspur
- Tehsil: Dhar Kalan

Government
  - Type: Panchayat raj
  - Body: Gram panchayat

Area
  - Total: 335 ha (830 acres)
- Elevation: 524 m (1,719 ft)

Population (2011)
  - Total: 2,543
  - Density: 759/km^{2} (1,970/sq mi)
  - Total Households: 504
- Sex ratio 1326/1217 ♂/♀

Languages
  - Official: Punjabi
- Time zone: UTC+5:30 (IST)
- PIN: 145022
- Telephone: 01870
- ISO 3166 code: IN-PB
- Vehicle registration: PB-06
- Website: gurdaspur.nic.in

Tureti is a village in Dhar Kalan in Gurdaspur district of Punjab State, India. It is located 24 kilometres (15 mi) from sub district headquarter, 12 kilometres (7.5 mi) from Pathankot, 48 kilometres (30 mi) from district headquarter and 251 kilometres (156 mi) from state capital Chandigarh. The village is administrated by Sarpanch an elected representative of the village.

== Demography ==
As of 2011, the village has a total number of 504 houses and a population of 2543 of which 1326 are males while 1217 are females according to the report published by Census India in 2011. The literacy rate of the village is 86%, highest than the state average of 75.84%. The population of children under the age of 6 years is 278 which is 10.93% of total population of the village, and child sex ratio is approximately 665 lower than the state average of 846.

Most of the people are from Schedule Caste which constitutes 29.56% of total population in the village. The town does not have any Schedule Tribe population so far.

As per census 2011, 690 people were engaged in work activities out of the total population of the village which includes 610 males and 80 females. According to census survey report 2011, 76.67% workers describe their work as main work and 23.33% workers are involved in marginal activity providing the livelihood for less than 6 months.

== Transport ==
The nearest train station is located 22 kilometres (14 mi) away in Dalhousie road and Sri Guru Ram Dass Jee International Airport is 140 kilometres (87 mi) away from the village.

== See also ==
- List of villages in India
