= Thara Uparla =

- Village
- Location in Punjab, India Thara Uparla (India)
- Coordinates: 32.4365651°N 75.7279654°E
- Country: India
- State: Punjab
- District: Gurdaspur
- Tehsil: Dhar Kalan

Government
  - Type: Panchayat raj
  - Body: Gram panchayat

Area
  - Total: 1,897 ha (4,690 acres)
- Elevation: 524 m (1,719 ft)

Population (2011)
  - Total: 3,769
  - Density: 198.7/km^{2} (514.6/sq mi)
  - Total Households: 969
- Sex ratio 2055/1714 ♂/♀

Languages
  - Official: Punjabi
- Time zone: UTC+5:30 (IST)
- PIN: 145022
- Telephone: 01870
- ISO 3166 code: IN-PB
- Vehicle registration: PB-06
- Website: gurdaspur.nic.in

Thara Uparla is a village in Dhar Kalan in Gurdaspur district of Punjab State, India. It is located 11 kilometres (6.8 mi) from sub district headquarter, 7 kilometres (4.3 mi) from Pathankot, 70 kilometres (43 mi) from district headquarter and 264 kilometres (164 mi) from state capital Chandigarh. The village is administrated by Sarpanch an elected representative of the village.

== Demography ==
As of 2011, the village has a total number of 969 houses and a population of 3769 of which 2055 are males while 1714 are females according to the report published by Census India in 2011. The literacy rate of the village is 78.60%, highest than the state average of 75.84%. The population of children under the age of 6 years is 307 which is 8.15% of total population of the village, and child sex ratio is approximately 651 lower than the state average of 846.

Most of the people are from Schedule Caste which constitutes 23.03% of total population in the village. The town does not have any Schedule Tribe population so far.

As per census 2011, 1105 people were engaged in work activities out of the total population of the village which includes 954 males and 151 females. According to census survey report 2011, 91.22% workers describe their work as main work and 8.78% workers are involved in marginal activity providing the livelihood for less than 6 months.

== Transport ==
The nearest train station is located 24 kilometres (15 mi) away in Dalhousie road and Sri Guru Ram Dass Jee International Airport is 152 kilometres (94 mi) away from the village.

== See also ==
- List of villages in India
