= Lanjera =

- Village
- Location in Punjab, India Lanjera (India)
- Coordinates: 32.4137988°N 75.8734554°E
- Country: India
- State: Punjab
- District: Gurdaspur
- Tehsil: Dhar Kalan

Government
  - Type: Panchayat raj
  - Body: Gram panchayat

Area
  - Total: 670 ha (1,700 acres)
- Elevation: 524 m (1,719 ft)

Population (2011)
  - Total: 1,025
  - Density: 150/km^{2} (400/sq mi)
  - Total Households: 207
- Sex ratio 527/498 ♂/♀

Languages
  - Official: Punjabi
- Time zone: UTC+5:30 (IST)
- PIN: 145022
- Telephone: 01870
- ISO 3166 code: IN-PB
- Vehicle registration: PB-06
- Website: gurdaspur.nic.in

Lanjera is a village in Dhar Kalan in Gurdaspur district of Punjab State, India. It is located 22 kilometres (14 mi) from sub district headquarter, 12 kilometres (7.5 mi) from Pathankot, 90 kilometres (56 mi) from district headquarter and 275 kilometres (171 mi) from state capital Chandigarh. The village is administrated by Sarpanch an elected representative of the village.

== Demography ==
As of 2011, the village has a total number of 207 houses and a population of 1025 of which 527 are males while 498 are females according to the report published by Census India in 2011. The literacy rate of the village is 83.31%, highest than the state average of 75.84%. The population of children under the age of 6 years is 138 which is 13.46% of total population of the village, and child sex ratio is approximately 747 lower than the state average of 846.

Most of the people are from Schedule Caste which constitutes 8.39% of total population in the village. The town does not have any Schedule Tribe population so far.

As per census 2011, 271 people were engaged in work activities out of the total population of the village which includes 255 males and 16 females. According to census survey report 2011, 97.5% workers describe their work as main work and 2.95% workers are involved in marginal activity providing the livelihood for less than 6 months.

== Transport ==
The nearest train station is located 31 kilometres (19 mi) away in Dalhousie road and Sri Guru Ram Dass Jee International Airport is 170 kilometres (110 mi) away from the village.

== See also ==
- List of villages in India
