= Rohg =

- Village
- Location in Punjab, India Rohg (India)
- Coordinates: 32.3985197°N 75.8625653°E
- Country: India
- State: Punjab
- District: Gurdaspur
- Tehsil: Dhar Kalan

Government
  - Type: Panchayat raj
  - Body: Gram panchayat

Area
  - Total: 397 ha (980 acres)
- Elevation: 524 m (1,719 ft)

Population (2011)
  - Total: 862
  - Density: 217/km^{2} (562/sq mi)
  - Total Households: 167
- Sex ratio 430/432 ♂/♀

Languages
  - Official: Punjabi
- Time zone: UTC+5:30 (IST)
- PIN: 145022
- Telephone: 01870
- ISO 3166 code: IN-PB
- Vehicle registration: PB-06
- Website: gurdaspur.nic.in

Rohg is a village in Dhar Kalan in Gurdaspur district of Punjab State, India. It is located 14 kilometres (8.7 mi) from sub district headquarter, 8 kilometres (5.0 mi) from Pathankot, 85 kilometres (53 mi) from district headquarter and 271 kilometres (168 mi) from state capital Chandigarh. The village is administrated by Sarpanch an elected representative of the village.

== Demography ==
As of 2011, the village has a total number of 167 houses and a population of 862 of which 430 are males while 432 are females according to the report published by Census India in 2011. The literacy rate of the village is 84.24%, highest than the state average of 75.84%. The population of children under the age of 6 years is 94 which is 10.90% of total population of the village, and child sex ratio is approximately 1238 highest than the state average of 846.

Most of the people are from Schedule Caste which constitutes 31.21% of total population in the village. The town does not have any Schedule Tribe population so far.

As per census 2011, 192 people were engaged in work activities out of the total population of the village which includes 183 males and 9 females. According to census survey report 2011, 85.42% workers describe their work as main work and 14.58% workers are involved in marginal activity providing the livelihood for less than 6 months.

== Transport ==
The nearest train station is located 28 kilometres (17 mi) away in Dalhousie road and Sri Guru Ram Dass Jee International Airport is 168 kilometres (104 mi) away from the village.

== See also ==
- List of villages in India
