= Darkua Bangla =

- Village
- Country: India
- State: Punjab
- District: Gurdaspur
- Tehsil: Dhar Kalan

Government
  - Type: Panchayat raj
  - Body: Gram panchayat

Area
  - Total: 449 ha (1,110 acres)

Population (2011)
  - Total: 422
  - Density: 94.0/km^{2} (243/sq mi)
  - Total Households: 80
- Sex ratio 222/200 ♂/♀

Languages
  - Official: Punjabi
- Time zone: UTC+5:30 (IST)
- PIN: 145022
- ISO 3166 code: IN-PB
- Vehicle registration: PB-06
- Website: gurdaspur.nic.in

Darkua Bangla is a village in Dhar Kalan in Gurdaspur district of Punjab State, India. It is located 28 kilometres (17 mi) from sub district headquarter, 13 kilometres (8.1 mi) from Pathankot and 96 kilometres (60 mi) from district headquarter. The village is administrated by Sarpanch an elected representative of the village.

== Demography ==
As of 2011, the village has a total number of 80 houses and a population of 422 of which 222 are males while 200 are females according to the report published by Census India in 2011. The literacy rate of the village is 79.18%, higher than the state average of 75.84%. The population of children under the age of 6 years is 57 which is 13.51% of total population of the village, and child sex ratio is approximately 966 higher than the state average of 846.

Most of the people are from Schedule Caste which constitutes 42.65% of total population in the village. The town does not have any Schedule Tribe population so far.

As per census 2011, 131 people were engaged in work activities out of the total population of the village which includes 122 males and 9 females. According to census survey report 2011, 53.44% workers describe their work as main work and 46.56% workers are involved in marginal activity providing the livelihood for less than 6 months.

== See also ==
- List of villages in India
