= Hardo Saran =

- Village
- Location in Punjab, India Hardo Saran (India)
- Coordinates: 32.4381797°N 75.7829252°E
- Country: India
- State: Punjab
- District: Gurdaspur
- Tehsil: Dhar Kalan

Government
  - Type: Panchayat raj
  - Body: Gram panchayat

Area
  - Total: 281 ha (690 acres)
- Elevation: 524 m (1,719 ft)

Population (2011)
  - Total: 368
  - Density: 131/km^{2} (339/sq mi)
  - Total Households: 82
- Sex ratio 188/180 ♂/♀

Languages
  - Official: Punjabi
- Time zone: UTC+5:30 (IST)
- PIN: 145022
- Telephone: 01870
- ISO 3166 code: IN-PB
- Vehicle registration: PB-06
- Website: gurdaspur.nic.in

Hardo Saran is a village in Dhar Kalan in Gurdaspur district of Punjab State, India. It is located 3 kilometres (1.9 mi) from subdistrict headquarters, 8 kilometres (5.0 mi) from Pathankot, 74 kilometres (46 mi) from district headquarters and 291 kilometres (181 mi) from state capital Chandigarh. The village is administrated by Sarpanch an elected representative of the village.

== Demography ==
As of 2011, the village has a total number of 82 houses and a population of 368 of which 188 are males while 180 are females according to the report published by Census India in 2011. The literacy rate of the village is 77.91%, higher than the state average of 75.84%. The population of children under the age of 6 years is 42 which is 11.41% of total population of the village, and child sex ratio is approximately 826 lower than the state average of 846.

Most of the people are from Schedule Caste which constitutes 8.15% of total population in the village. The town does not have any Schedule Tribe population so far.

As per census 2011, 106 people were engaged in work activities out of the total population of the village which includes 96 males and 10 females. According to census survey report 2011, 88.68% workers describe their work as main work and 11.32% workers are involved in marginal activity providing the livelihood for less than 6 months.

== Transport ==
The nearest train station is located 50 kilometres (31 mi) away in Dalhousie road and Sri Guru Ram Dass Jee International Airport is 181 kilometres (112 mi) away from the village.

== See also ==
- List of villages in India
