= Thara Jhikla =

- Village
- Location in Punjab, India Thara Jhikla (India)
- Coordinates: 32.4132802°N 75.7213904°E
- Country: India
- State: Punjab
- District: Gurdaspur
- Tehsil: Dhar Kalan

Government
  - Type: Panchayat raj
  - Body: Gram panchayat

Area
  - Total: 2,041 ha (5,040 acres)
- Elevation: 524 m (1,719 ft)

Population (2011)
  - Total: 3,624
  - Density: 177.6/km^{2} (459.9/sq mi)
  - Total Households: 667
- Sex ratio 1907/1717 ♂/♀

Languages
  - Official: Punjabi
- Time zone: UTC+5:30 (IST)
- PIN: 145022
- Telephone: 01870
- ISO 3166 code: IN-PB
- Vehicle registration: PB-06
- Website: gurdaspur.nic.in

Thara Jhikla is a village in Dhar Kalan in Gurdaspur district of Punjab State, India. It is located 11 kilometres (6.8 mi) from sub district headquarter, 8 kilometres (5.0 mi) from Pathankot, 60 kilometres (37 mi) from district headquarter and 259 kilometres (161 mi) from state capital Chandigarh. The village is administrated by Sarpanch an elected representative of the village.

== Demography ==
As of 2011, the village has a total number of 667 houses and a population of 3627 of which 1907 are males while 1717 are females according to the report published by Census India in 2011. The literacy rate of the village is 80.04%, highest than the state average of 75.84%. The population of children under the age of 6 years is 477 which is 13.16% of total population of the village, and child sex ratio is approximately 780 lower than the state average of 846.

Most of the people are from Schedule Caste which constitutes 22.54% of total population in the village. The town does not have any Schedule Tribe population so far.

As per census 2011, 1235 people were engaged in work activities out of the total population of the village which includes 1020 males and 215 females. According to census survey report 2011, 66.80% workers describe their work as main work and 33.20% workers are involved in marginal activity providing the livelihood for less than 6 months.

== Transport ==
The nearest train station is located 29 kilometres (18 mi) away in Dalhousie road and Sri Guru Ram Dass Jee International Airport is 147 kilometres (91 mi) away from the village.

== See also ==
- List of villages in India
