= Ashwani Kumar Sharma (Punjab politician) =

Indian politician

Member of the Punjab Legislative Assembly
- Incumbent
- Assumed office 10 March 2022
- Preceded by: Amit Vij
- Constituency: Pathankot
- In office 2012–2017
- Preceded by: Master Mohan Lal
- Succeeded by: Amit Vij
- Constituency: Pathankot

President of Bharatiya Janata Party, Punjab
- In office 17 January 2020 - 4 July 2023
- Preceded by: Shwait Malik
- Succeeded by: Sunil Jakhar
- In office 4 February 2010 – 16 January 2013
- Preceded by: Rajinder Bhandari
- Succeeded by: Kamal Sharma

Personal details
- Born: 23 January 1964 (age 62) Pathankot, Punjab, India
- Party: Bharatiya Janata Party
- Children: 1 Son

Ashwani Kumar Sharma (born 23 January 1964) is an Indian politician and the former Bharatiya Janta Party (BJP) Punjab president. He is a member of Punjab Legislative Assembly and currently representing Pathankot Assembly constituency.

== Early life ==
Sharma was born in a lower-middle-class Punjabi Hindu family on 23 January 1964. His family had migrated to Pathankot from Sialkot after partition.

Ashwani Kumar Sharma received his early schooling at Vivekananda Model High School, Pathankot and later received a Bachelor of Arts from Guru Nanak Dev University.

== Assets and liabilities declared during elections ==
During the 2022 Punjab Legislative Assembly election, he declared Rs. 1,40,66,533 as an overall financial asset and Rs. nil as financial liability.

== Politics ==
Sharma was involved with RSS. During his college days in Pathankot, he was a member of ABVP. After a term in office he was appointed General Secretary BJP Punjab from 2007 to 2010. Meanwhile, he became Chairman of District Planning Board Gurdaspur. He was made State President in 2010.

He was made the President B.J.Y.M. (Pb) in 2004. After a successful term he was appointed General Secretary BJP Punjab from 2007 to 2010.

As of July 7, 2025, Ashwani Kumar Sharma was appointed the working president of the Bharatiya Janata Party's (BJP) Punjab unit. Sharma is also a sitting Member of the Legislative Assembly (MLA) for the Pathankot seat in the Punjab Legislative Assembly.

The decision to appoint Sharma was made by BJP national president J.P. Nadda and was effective immediately. Sharma previously served as the state unit's president and was replaced by Sunil Jakhar in July 2023. His new appointment is a move toward eventually replacing Jakhar, who had already resigned from the post in September 2024 but was asked to continue until a replacement was named.

Sharma's new role is seen as a way to prepare the party for the 2027 Punjab Assembly polls, with organizational changes expected.

== MLA ==
He became Chairman of District Planning Board Gurdaspur. He was elected as BJP Punjab State President in 2010. Under his leadership party performed exceptionally well in 2012 legislative elections by winning all the Vidhan Sabha seats for BJP in Dist. Pathankot and contributed in building SAD-BJP alliance and was able to repeat the coalition government in Punjab after 43 years and also became member of legislative assembly in 2012.

He was elected as MLA in 2022. The Aam Aadmi Party gained a strong 79% majority in the sixteenth Punjab Legislative Assembly by winning 92 out of 117 seats in the 2022 Punjab Legislative Assembly election. MP Bhagwant Mann was sworn in as Chief Minister on 16 March 2022.

== Electoral performance ==
Punjab Assembly election, 2012: Pathankot
Party	Candidate	Votes	%	±%
BJP	Ashwani Kumar Sharma	42,218	44.56	▲2.26
INC	Raman Kumar Bhalla	24,362	25.71	▼8.33
Independent	Ashok Sharma	23,713	25.03	
Majority		17,856	18.85	▲10.59
Turnout		94,742	72.66	▼0.87
BJP hold				

Punjab Assembly election, 2017: Pathankot
Party	Candidate	Votes	%	±%
INC	Amit Vij	56,383	50.86	▲25.15
BJP	Ashwani Kumar Sharma	45,213	40.79	▼3.77
AAP	Raj Kumar	6,036	5.45	New
NOTA	None of the above	907	0.82	
Majority		11,170	10.08	▼8.77
Turnout		110,853	76.13	▲3.47
Registered electors		145,604		
INC gain from BJP				

Punjab Assembly election, 2022: Pathankot
Party	Candidate	Votes	%	±%
BJP	Ashwani Kumar Sharma	43,132	38.01	▼2.78
INC	Amit Vij	35,373	31.17	▼19.69
AAP	Vibhuti Sharma	31,451	27.72	▲22.27
NOTA	None of the above	666	0.59	▼0.23
Majority		7,759	6.84	▼3.24
Turnout		113,480	74.40	▼1.73
Registered electors		152,519		▲4.53
BJP gain from INC				
