= Tarkhanawali =

- Village
- Location in Punjab, India Tarkhanawali (India)
- Coordinates: 31.435681°N 75.261031°E
- Country: India
- State: Punjab
- District: Kapurthala

Government
  - Type: Panchayati raj (India)
  - Body: Gram panchayat

Population (2011)
  - Total: 139
- Sex ratio 72/67♂/♀

Languages
  - Official: Punjabi
  - Other spoken: Hindi
- Time zone: UTC+5:30 (IST)
- PIN: 144804
- Telephone code: 01822
- ISO 3166 code: IN-PB
- Vehicle registration: PB-09
- Website: kapurthala.gov.in

Tarkhanawali is a village in Kapurthala district of Punjab State, India. It is located 14 kilometres (8.7 mi) from Kapurthala, which is both district and sub-district headquarters of Tarkhanawali. The village is administrated by a Sarpanch who is an elected representative of village and the home of the loyal family.

== Transport ==
Dhilwan Rail Way Station, Beas Rail Way Station are the nearby railway stations to Tarkhanawali however, Jalandhar City Rail Way station is 34 km away from the village. The village is 61 km away from Sri Guru Ram Dass Jee International Airport in Amritsar, and another near airport is Pathankot Airport in Pathankot which is located 92 km away also Sahnewal Airport is a near airport which is 94 km away in Amritsar from the village.
