= Amit Vij =

Indian politician

Member of the Punjab Legislative Assembly
- In office 4 February 2017 – 10 March 2022
- Preceded by: Ashwani Sharma
- Succeeded by: Ashwani Sharma
- Constituency: Pathankot

Personal details
- Born: 9 November 1977 (age 48) Pathankot, Punjab, India
- Party: Indian National Congress
- Spouse: Geetika Vij
- Parents: Anil Vij (father); Shashi Vij (mother)
- Profession: Politician

Amit Vij (born 9 November 1977) is an Indian politician and a member of Indian National Congress. In 2017, he was elected as the member of the Punjab Legislative Assembly from Pathankot but in 2022, he lost the seat to BJP's Ashwani Sharma.

== Constituency ==
Vij represented the Pathankot. Vij won the Pathankot on an INC ticket, Vij beat the member of the Punjab Legislative Assembly Ashwani Kumar Sharma of the BJP by over 11170 votes. But in 2022 Elections, he lost the seat against Ashwani Sharma, BJP candidate.

== Political party ==
Vij is from the INC and former MLA of Pathankot.
