= Hajipur, Gurdaspur =

Village in Punjab, India

Hajipur village is located in Pathankot tehsil in Gurdaspur district, in the Indian state of Punjab. It is 45 km from the district headquarter Gurdaspur. Mirjapur is the Gram panchayat of Hijapur. The total population is 44 people, out of which 22 are male and 22 are female.

Pincode of this village is 145023.
