= Raghunath Sahai Puri =

Indian politician

MLA, Punjab
- In office 1985 - 1997
- Preceded by: Chaman Lal (politician)
- Succeeded by: Satpal Saini
- Constituency: Sujanpur
- In office 2002 - 2007
- Preceded by: Satpal Saini
- Succeeded by: Dinesh Singh
- Constituency: Sujanpur

Minister for Housing & Urban Development
- In office 2007 - 2012
- Chief Minister: Capt. Amarinder Singh
- Succeeded by: Parkash Singh Badal

Personal details
- Born: 1938 Sujanpur
- Died: 22 December 2007 (aged 68–69) Chandigarh
- Party: Indian National Congress
- Spouse: Kamini Devi
- Children: Three daughters(Surbhi Bedi, Sangeeta Kapoor and Sarita Chopra), a son Naresh Puri

Raghunath Sahai Puri was an Indian politician and a member of Indian National Congress. He was the Minister for Housing & Urban Development in Punjab Government during 2002-2007.

== Early life ==
He was born in 1938 in Sujanpur, Punjab, India. His father's name was Des Raj Puri.

== Political career ==
He was elected to the Punjab Legislative Assembly in 1985 from Sujanpur. He was re-elected from Sujanpur in 1992 and 2002. In 2002 he was made a cabinet minister in Punjab and given portfolios of Housing & Urban Development. He had held portfolios of tourism and transport also.

== Death ==
He died on 22 December 2007 in Chandigarh.
