= Jugial =

- Location in Punjab, India Jugial (India)
- Country: India
- State: Punjab
- District: Pathankot

Population
  - Total: 16,664

Languages
  - Official: Punjabi
- Time zone: UTC+5:30 (IST)
- PIN: 145029
- Telephone code: 01870
- Vehicle registration: PB-35

Jugial is a census town in Pathankot district in the Indian state of Punjab India

== Demographics ==
As of 2001 India census, Jugial had a population of 16,664. Males constitute 54% of the population and females 46%. Jugial has an average literacy rate of 79%, higher than the national average of 74.04%: male literacy is 81%, and female literacy is 76%. In Jugial, 11% of the population is under 6 years of age.

Jugial lies 13 km north of Pathankot and 6 km east of Madhopur, it lies near Shapurkandi village, which is the last town of Punjab, before entering the state of Jammu and Kashmir while traveling on Amritsar-Jammu National Highway. Jugial is situated on the road to the Ranjit Sagar Dam Project from Pathankot, Punjab. While, Ranjit Sagar Dam Project is further 15 km from Jugial, various fabrication unit & other workshops and the staff colony of the project is located in the land adjoining Jugial.

== Education ==
=== Schools ===
- Presentation Public School - nursery to higher classes
- Auckland Public School - kindergarten to 12th grade
