= Dunera, Punjab =

Dunera
- Village
- Location in Punjab, India Dunera (India)
- Coordinates: 32.4765537°N 75.8028153°E
- Country: India
- State: Punjab
- District: Pathankot
- Tehsil: Dhar Kalan

Government
  - Type: Panchayat raj
  - Body: Gram panchayat

Area
  - Total: 849 ha (2,100 acres)
- Elevation: 524 m (1,719 ft)

Population (2011)
  - Total: 2,502
  - Density: 295/km^{2} (763/sq mi)
  - Total Households: 511
- Sex ratio 1290/1212 ♂/♀

Languages
  - Official: Punjabi
- Time zone: UTC+5:30 (IST)
- PIN: 145022
- Telephone: 01870
- ISO 3166 code: IN-PB
- Vehicle registration: PB-68
- Website: pathankot.nic.in

Dunera is a village in Dhar Kalan in Pathankot district of Punjab State, India. It is located 17 kilometres (11 mi) from sub district headquarter, 8 kilometres (5.0 mi) from Pathankot, 85 kilometres (53 mi) from district headquarter and 276 kilometres (171 mi) from state capital Chandigarh. The village is administrated by Sarpanch an elected representative of the village.

== Demography ==
As of 2011, the village has a total number of 511 houses and a population of 2502 of which 1290 are males while 1937 are females according to the report published by Census India in 2011. The literacy rate of the village is 81.21%, higher than the state average of 75.84%. The population of children under the age of 6 years is 288 which is 11.51% of total population of the village, and child sex ratio is approximately 959 higher than the state average of 846.

Most of the people are from Schedule Caste which constitutes 45.12% of total population in the village. The town does not have any Schedule Tribe population so far.

As per census 2011, 723 people were engaged in work activities out of the total population of the village which includes 667 males and 56 females. According to census survey report 2011, 63.62% workers describe their work as main work and 36.38% workers are involved in marginal activity providing the livelihood for less than 6 months.

== Transport ==
The nearest train station is located 33 kilometres (21 mi) away in Dalhousie road and Sri Guru Ram Dass Jee International Airport is 170 kilometres (110 mi) away from the village.

== See also ==
- List of villages in India
