= Dunera =

Dunera may refer to:

- Dunera, Punjab
- SS Dunera, a steamship launched in 1891
- HMT Dunera, a British passenger ship launched in 1937 known for the Dunera affair and transporting the Dunera boys
- Dunera boys, a group at the Hay internment camp
  - The Dunera Boys, a 1985 miniseries
