= Amanpreet =

Amanpreet is a masculine Indian given name. Notable people with the name include:

- Amanpreet Ahluwalia (fl. 2002), Indian racing driver
- Amanpreet Gill (fl. 2025), Canadian politician
- Amanpreet Singh (born 1987), Indian sport shooter
