= Kirri Mangyal =

Kiri Mangyal is a village 16 km from the Pathankot, Punjab, India.
