= Bhoa village =

Bhoa
- Village
- Country: India
- State: Punjab
- District: Pathankot

Languages
  - Official: Punjabi
- Time zone: UTC+5:30 (IST)
- PIN: 145025

Bhoa is a town in Pathankot, Tehsil, in the Pathankot District of Punjab State, India is 13 km from Pathankot.

It is located near the border between Gurdaspur and Kangra Districts. Kangra District Indora is East towards this place. It is also near the border with Kathua district and on the border with both Himachal Pradesh and Jammu and Kashmir.

== Demography ==
The language primarily spoken in Bhoa Village is Punjabi.

== Politics ==
The city is part of the Bhoa Assembly Constituency.

== Education ==
=== Colleges near Bhoa ===
- M.g.n. College Jakholari Pathankot
- Sri Sai College Of Engineering & Technology,
- Aman Bhalla Institute Of Engg & Tech.

== Schools ==
- Gsss Bhoa
