= Pathankot Assembly constituency =

Legislative Assembly constituency in Punjab State, India

Coordinates: 32.27°N 75.65°E

Pathankot
- Constituency No. 3 for the Punjab Legislative Assembly

Constituency details
- Country: India
- State: Punjab
- District: Pathankot district
- Lok Sabha constituency: Gurdaspur
- Established: 1951
- Total electors: 152,519 (in 2022)
- Reservation: None

Member of Legislative Assembly
- 16th Punjab Legislative Assembly
- Incumbent Ashwani Kumar Sharma
- Party: BJP
- Alliance: NDA
- Elected year: 2022

Pathankot Assembly constituency is a Punjab Legislative Assembly constituency in Pathankot district, Punjab state, India. It is a segment of Gurdaspur (Lok Sabha constituency).

== Members of the Legislative Assembly ==
Most successful parties from Pathankot Vidhan Sabha
1. INC (7 Times) (43.8%)
2. BJP (5 Times) (31.2%)
3. BJS (1 Time) (6.25%)
4. IND (1 Time) (6.25%)
5. INC (I) (1 Time) (6.25%)
6. JP (1 Time) (6.25%)

Election	Name	Party
1952	Kesho Dass	Independent
1957	Bhagirath Lal	Indian National Congress
1962	Bhagirath Lal	Indian National Congress
1967	Chhajju Ram	Bharatiya Jana Sangh
1969	Ram Singh	Indian National Congress
1972	Ram Singh	Indian National Congress
1977	Om Parkash Bhardwaj	Janata Party
1980	Ram Swaroop Bagchi	Indian National Congress (Indira)
1985	Master Mohan Lal	Bharatiya Janata Party
1992	Raman Kumar Bhalla	Indian National Congress
1997	Master Mohan Lal	Bharatiya Janata Party
2002	Ashok Sharma	Indian National Congress
2007	Master Mohan Lal	Bharatiya Janata Party
2012	Ashwani Kumar Sharma	Bharatiya Janata Party
2017	Amit Vij	Indian National Congress
2022	Ashwani Kumar Sharma	Bharatiya Janata Party

== Election results ==
=== 2027 ===
Punjab Assembly election, 2027: Pathankot
Party	Candidate	Votes	%	±%
BJP				
INC				
AAP	Rohit Syal			
AD (WPD)				New entry
BSP				
SAD				New entry
NOTA	None of the above			
Majority				
Turnout				

=== 2022 ===
Punjab Assembly election, 2022: Pathankot
Party	Candidate	Votes	%	±%
BJP	Ashwani Kumar Sharma	43,132	38.01	▼2.78
INC	Amit Vij	35,373	31.17	▼19.69
AAP	Vibhuti Sharma	31,451	27.72	▲22.27
NOTA	None of the above	666	0.59	▼0.23
Majority		7,759	6.84	▼3.24
Turnout		113,480	74.40	▼1.73
Registered electors		152,519		▲4.53
BJP gain from INC				

=== 2017 ===
Punjab Assembly election, 2017: Pathankot
Party	Candidate	Votes	%	±%
INC	Amit Vij	56,383	50.86	▲25.15
BJP	Ashwani Kumar Sharma	45,213	40.79	▼3.77
AAP	Raj Kumar	6,036	5.45	New
NOTA	None of the above	907	0.82	
Majority		11,170	10.08	▼8.77
Turnout		110,853	76.13	▲3.47
Registered electors		145,604		
INC gain from BJP				

=== 2012 ===
Punjab Assembly election, 2012: Pathankot
Party	Candidate	Votes	%	±%
BJP	Ashwani Kumar Sharma	42,218	44.56	▲2.26
INC	Raman Kumar Bhalla	24,362	25.71	▼8.33
IND	Ashok Sharma	23,713	25.03	
Majority		17,856	18.85	▲10.59
Turnout		94,742	72.66	▼0.87
BJP hold				

=== 2007 ===
Punjab Assembly election, 2007: Pathankot
Party	Candidate	Votes	%	±%
BJP	Master Mohan Lal	43,717	42.30	▲7.30
INC	Ashok Sharma	35,182	34.04	▼22.89
IND	Ramesh Kumar	17,957	17.37	
Majority		8,535	8.26	
Turnout		103,360	73.53	▲9.12
BJP gain from INC				
