= Satpal Saini =

Indian politician from Punjab (died 2020)

Satpal Saini was an Indian politician and member of the Bharatiya Janata Party. Saini was a member of the Punjab Legislative Assembly from the Sujanpur constituency in Pathankot district.
