= Kataruchak =

Kataru Chak (or Kataruchak) is a village in Pathankot district of Punjab, India. The village comes under Post office Faridanagar and Tehsil as well as District Pathankot. The village is surrounded by 2 water bodies from 2 ends and has highly fertile land. The village Kataru Chack is having 4 sub-division within itself. These divisions are:

1. Kataru Chack (Main)
2. Purana Pind (Old Village)
3. Upprala Chack (Upper Side of Village having Shiv Mandir and Cultivation Fields)
4. Naya Gain (New Kataru Chak)

Important points about Kataru Chack:

- The village is having a population of around 1500.
- It has a very well known and ancient Shiv temple named Chat Pat Bani.
- It has highly fertile fields land and irrigation sources.

== Politics ==
Aam Aadmi Party leader and Punjab's Food, Civil Supplies & Consumer Affairs minister Lal Chand Kataruchak belongs to this village.His wife serves as the head of Gram Panchayat of Kataru Chak village.
