= Lal Chand Kataruchakk =

Indian politician (born 1970)

Lal Chand Kataruchak

Cabinet Minister, Government of Punjab
- Incumbent
- Assumed office 19 March 2022
- Governor: Banwarilal Purohit
- Cabinet: Mann ministry
- Chief Minister: Bhagwant Mann
- Ministry and Departments: Food & Civil Supplies; Consumer Affairs

Member of the Punjab Legislative Assembly
- Incumbent
- Assumed office 16 March 2022
- Preceded by: Joginder Pal
- Constituency: Bhoa

Personal details
- Born: Punjab, India
- Citizenship: Indian
- Party: Aam Aadmi Party
- Education: Matriculation
- Occupation: Social Workers

Lal Chand Kataruchak (born 1970) is an Indian politician from Punjab. He is an MLA from Bhoa Assembly constituency representing the Aam Aadmi Party. He had been a sarpanch of Kataruchak village for six terms.

== Early life and education ==
Kataruchak is from Kataruchak, Pathankot District, Punjab. He is the son of Labhu Ram. He passed matriculation in 2007 from Punjab School Education Board, Mohali, and later discontinued his studies.

== Assets and liabilities declared during elections ==
During the 2022 Punjab Legislative Assembly election, he declared Rs. 619,225 as an overall financial asset and Rs. nil as financial liability.

== Member of Legislative Assembly ==
Kataruchak was elected as the MLA in the 2022 Punjab Legislative Assembly election. The Aam Aadmi Party gained a strong 79% majority in the sixteenth Punjab Legislative Assembly by winning 92 out of 117 seats in the 2022 Punjab Legislative Assembly election. MP Bhagwant Mann was sworn in as Chief Minister on 16 March 2022. Kataruchak represented the Bhoa Assembly constituency in the Punjab Legislative Assembly. He took oath as a cabinet minister along with nine other MLAs on 19 March at Guru Nanak Dev auditorium of Punjab Raj Bhavan in Chandigarh. Eight ministers including Kataruchak who took oath were greenhorn (first term) MLAs.

As a cabinet minister in the Mann ministry Kataruchak was given the charge of two departments of the Punjab Government:

1. Department of Food, Civil Supplies & Consumer Affairs
2. Department of Forest and Wild Life Preservation

== Controversy ==
On 28 April 2023, a controversy surrounded Lal Chand Kataruchak when Congress sitting MLA from Bholath constituency Sukhpal Singh Khaira in a press conference at Jalandhar, accused him of allegedly appointing his son and other two relatives including son of his sister-in-law as personal staff. Lal Chand has denied these allegations while drawing flak from all opposition parties including BJP.

He has reportedly come under the radar of the Enforcement Directorate (ED) in connection with a money laundering probe linked to alleged illegal mining and unlawful transfer of shamlat land (village common land owned collectively by a community) in Pathankot.

== Electoral performance ==
Punjab Assembly election, 2017: Bhoa
| Party | Candidate | Votes | % | ±% |
|---|---|---|---|---|
| INC | Joginder Pal | 67,865 | 51.95 | ▲16.60 |
| BJP | Seema Kumari | 40,369 | 30.90 | ▼15.64 |
| RMPI | Lal Chand Kataru Chak | 13,353 | 10.22 | New entry |
| AAP | Amarjeet Singh | 3,767 | 2.88 | New entry |
| NOTA | None of the above | 454 | 0.35 | −− |
| Majority | | 27,496 | 20.97 | |
| Turnout | | 131,091 | 75.20 | ▲3.88 |
| Registered electors | | 174,313 | | |
| INC gain from BJP | | Swing | | |

Punjab Assembly election, 2022: Bhoa
| Party | Candidate | Votes | % | ±% |
|---|---|---|---|---|
| AAP | Lal Chand Kataruchakk | 50,339 | 36.59 | ▲33.71 |
| INC | Joginder Pal | 49,135 | 35.72 | ▼14.43 |
| BJP | Seema Kumari | 29,132 | 21.18 | ▼9.72 |
| BSP | Rakesh Kumar Majotara | 5,046 | 3.67 | ▲3.14 |
| NOTA | None of the above | 749 | 0.54 | ▲0.19 |
| Majority | | 1,204 | 0.87 | |
| Turnout | | 137572 | | |
| Registered electors | | 182,915 | | |
| AAP gain from INC | | | | |

Political offices
| Preceded by Bharat Bhushan Ashu | Punjab Cabinet minister for Food, Civil Supplies & Consumer Affairs; 2022–present | Incumbent |
| Preceded by Sangat Singh Gilzian | Punjab Cabinet minister for Forest and Wild Life Preservation; 2022–present | Incumbent |
State Legislative Assembly
| Preceded by Joginder Pal (INC) | Member of the Punjab Legislative Assembly from Bhoa Assembly constituency 2022 – | Incumbent |
