= Abadgarh, Gurdaspur =

Abadgarh
- Village
- Location in Punjab, India Abadgarh (India)
- Coordinates: 32°6′N 75°36′E
- Country: India
- State: Punjab
- District: Pathankot

Languages
  - Official: Punjabi
- Time zone: UTC+5:30 (IST)

Abadgarh is a village in Pathankot. Pathankot is a district in the Indian state of Punjab.
