= Ajit Singh Kohar =

Indian politician

MLA, Punjab
- In office 1997 - 4 Feb 2017
- Preceded by: Brij Bhupinder Singh
- Succeeded by: Constituency underwent Boundary delimitation
- Constituency: Shahkot
- In office 2012 - 2018
- Preceded by: New Constituency
- Constituency: Shahkot

Minister for Revenue and Rehabilitation
- In office 2007 - 2012
- Chief Minister: Parkash Singh Badal
- Preceded by: Amarjit Singh Samra
- Succeeded by: Bikram Singh Majithia

Minister for Transport
- In office 2012 - 2017
- Chief Minister: Parkash Singh Badal
- Preceded by: Master Mohan Lal

Personal details
- Party: Shiromani Akali Dal

Ajit Singh Kohar was an Indian politician and a member of Shiromani Akali Dal. He was the Minister of Transport, Legal & Legislative Affairs and Elections in the Punjab Government.

== Political career ==
Jathedar Ajit Singh Kohar was firstly elected to the Punjab Legislative Assembly in 1997 on an Akali Dal ticket from Lohian by defeating Congress candidate Chaudhary Darshan Singh by more than 27160 votes, a huge margin. Jathedar Ajit Singh Kohar was appointed and held the portfolios of Minister Of Defence Services, Agriculture, Jail in Sardar Parkash Singh Ji Badal Sahab's 3rd Ministry. Jathedar Kohar was re-elected from Lohian in 2002 by defeating former Home Minister Brij Bhupinder Singh Lally Kang by 5144 votes and in 2007 Jathedar Ajit Singh Kohar Sahab successfully contested for a 3rd win from Lohian and defeated Congress candidate Lt. Col. CD Singh Kamboj by 19000 votes, a huge margin. In 2007, he was made Minister for Revenue and Rehabilitation. In 2012, Lohian underwent boundary delimitation. Kohar successfully contested from new constituency Shahkot. Currently he is an ex cabinet minister in Punjab and holding portfolios of Transport, Legal & Legislative Affairs and Elections. In 2017 Punjab Vidhan Sabha elections Jathedar Ajit Singh Kohar successfully contested from Shahkot constituency and won for the 5th time. Shiromani Akali Dal Party President Sardar Sukubir Singh Ji Badal appointed Jathedar Kohar as Deputy Leader of opposition in Punjab Vidhan Sabha. Jathedar Ajit Singh Kohar Sahab also held the responsibility of the President of the Shiromani Akali Dal District Jalandhar (Rural). He was made President from 1987 till 2018 (31) Years. Jathedar Ajit Singh Kohar held the responsibility of the President of the Shiromani Akali Dal Jalandhar (Rural).
