= National Highway 154A (India) =

National highway in India

National Highway 154A
- Map of National Highway 154A in red

Route information
- Length: 167 km (104 mi)

Major junctions
- West end: Chakki
- East end: Bharmour

Location
- Country: India
- States: Himachal Pradesh, Punjab

Highway system
- Roads in India; Expressways; National; State; Asian
← NH 154	→ NH 154

National Highway 154A, commonly called NH 154A is a national highway in India. It is a spur road of National Highway 54. NH-154A traverses the states of Punjab and Himachal Pradesh in India.

== Route ==
Chakki, Dhar, Banikhet, Chamba, Bharmour.

== Junctions ==
Terminal with National Highway 154 near Chakki.

== See also ==
- List of national highways in India
- List of national highways in India by state
