= Dinesh Singh (Punjab politician) =

Indian politician

Thakur Dinesh Singh

Member of Punjab Legislative Assembly
- In office 2007 - 2022
- Preceded by: Raghunath Sahai Puri
- Succeeded by: Naresh Puri
- Constituency: Sujanpur

Deputy Speaker of Punjab assembly
- In office 2012 - 2017
- Preceded by: Chuni Lal Bhagat
- Succeeded by: Ajaib Singh Bhati

Personal details
- Born: 17 June 1962 (age 63)
- Party: Bharatiya Janta Party

Thakur Dinesh Singh (nickname Babbu) is an Indian politician from Punjab and a member of Bharatiya Janta Party (BJP). He is a former MLA from Sujanpur & Ex Deputy Speaker of Punjab Legislative Assembly.

== Early life ==
Thakur Dinesh Singh was born in Manwal village in Pathankot (Gurdaspur) on 17 June 1962. His father's name is Bhim Singh.His grandfather was Chaudhary Dharam Singh ex Nambardar of Manwal village.

== Political career ==
Singh was General Secretary of Akhil Bharatiya Vidyarthi Parishad (Pathankot). He was elected to the Punjab Legislative Assembly in 2007 from Sujanpur. He was re-elected in 2012. Since 20 March 2012, he has been Deputy Speaker of Punjab Legislative Assembly.
