= Amanpreet Ahluwalia =

Indian racing driver

- Nationality: Indian
- Born: Pathankot, Punjab
- Years active: 2002-present

Amanpreet Ahluwalia is an Indian racing driver and a national Go-Karting champion and national Autocross Champion. He was the National Champion two years running in the National Karting Championship in 2002–03.

== Background ==
Ahluwalia was born in Pathankot, India. He started his motorsports career at the age of 18. He subsequently moved onto other forms of competitive motorsports like Formula FISSME, sprints, autocross, raids and rallying. He remains one of the only Indians to have taken part in all forms of the sport. Aman was also part of the first Indian racing team known as Team Valvoline. He is the founder of Auto Attitudes Motorsports.

== Career ==
=== Racing career summary ===
Season	Championship	Position	ref
2002	JK Tyre Regional Go Karting Championship – Delhi Kart	1st Place	
2002	JK Tyre National Go Karting Championship – Delhi Kart		
2003	Raid de Himalaya – Great Himalayas Esteem	Fastest Esteem Driver (trophy)	
2003	JK Tyre Go Karting Championship Delhi Kart	1st Place	
2003	Jaipur Autocross 800 cc	1st Place	
2003	Desert Storm Rally– Jaipur Esteem	1st Place	
2004	Raid de Himalaya – Great Himalaya Esteem	1st Place	
2004	Cyclone Championship Go Karting– Gurgaon Kart	1st Place	
2005	Maruti Suzuki Autocross Noida Baleno	1st Place	
2006	Chandigarh Rally INRC Esteem	1st Place	
2010	Maruti Autocross Open	1st Place	
2010	Maruti Autocross Baleno	1st Place	
2010	Maruti Autocross Stock Zen	1st Place	
2010	Maruti Autocross Gypsy	1st Place	
2011	Maruti Autocross Gypsy	1st Place	
2012	Maruti Autocross Gypsy	1st Place	
2012	Raid De Himalaya	2nd Place	
2013	Maruti Suzuki Dakshin Dare	1st Place	
2013	Sjoba Rally Gypsy	1st Place	
2014	Maruti Suzuki Dakshin Dare	3rd Place	
2014	Bashaki Sprint Esteem Gypsy	1st Place	
2015	Sjoba Rally Gypsy	1st Place	
2016	Sjoba Rally Gypsy	1st Place	
2016	National Autocross Champion 4X4 Gypsy	1st Place	
2017	National Autocross Champion India Swift	1st Place	
2017	JK Tyre Arunachal Festival of Speed		
2017	BND Autocross Gypsy	1st Place	
2017	Oraz Dirt Fest Gypsy	1st Place	
2017	Northern Motorsport Autocross Gypsy	1st Place	
2018	BND Motorsports Gypsy	1st Place	
2018	Oraz Slush X Gypsy	1st Place	
2018	National Autocross Gypsy	2nd Place	
2019	Speed Springs Gypsy	1st Place	
2019	BND Tramac Fest Gypsy	1st Place	
2019	Jaipur Autocross Gypsy	1st Place	
