= Sujanpur, Punjab Assembly constituency =

Legislative Assembly constituency in Punjab, India

Coordinates: 23.7°N 76.42°E

Sujanpur
- Constituency No. 1 for the Punjab Legislative Assembly

Constituency details
- Country: India
- State: Punjab
- District: Gurdaspur
- Lok Sabha constituency: Gurdaspur
- Total electors: 167,230 (in 2022)
- Reservation: None

Member of Legislative Assembly
- 16th Punjab Legislative Assembly
- Incumbent Naresh Puri
- Party: Indian National Congress
- Elected year: 2022

Sujanpur Assembly constituency is a Punjab Legislative Assembly constituency in Pathankot district, Punjab state, India.

== Members of the Legislative Assembly ==
Most successful parties from Sujanpur, Punjab Vidhan Sabha
1. INC (6 Times) (54.5%)
2. BJP (4 Times) (36.4%)
3. INC(I) (1 Time) (9.09%)

| Year | Member | Party |
|---|---|---|
| 1952 | Partap Singh Kairon | Indian National Congress |
Constituency defunct (1957-1977)
| 1977 | Chaman Lal | Indian National Congress |
| 1980 | Chaman Lal | Indian National Congress (Indira) |
| 1985 | Raghunath Sahai Puri | Indian National Congress |
| 1992 | Raghunath Sahai Puri | Indian National Congress |
| 1997 | Satpal Saini | Bharatiya Janata Party |
| 2002 | Raghunath Sahai Puri | Indian National Congress |
| 2007 | Dinesh Singh | Bharatiya Janata Party |
| 2012 | Dinesh Singh | Bharatiya Janata Party |
| 2017 | Dinesh Singh | Bharatiya Janata Party |
| 2022 | Naresh Puri | Indian National Congress |

== Election results ==
=== 2027 ===
Punjab Assembly election, 2027: Sujanpur
| Party | Candidate | Votes | % | ±% |
|---|---|---|---|---|
| BJP | | | | New entry |
| INC | | | | |
| AAP | Swaran Salaria | | | |
| BSP | | | | |
| SAD | | | | |
| AD (WPD) | | | | |
| NOTA | None of the above | | | |
| Majority | | | | |
| Turnout | | | | |

=== 2022 ===
Punjab Assembly election, 2022: Sujanpur
| Party | Candidate | Votes | % | ±% |
|---|---|---|---|---|
| INC | Naresh Puri | 46,916 | 36.27 | ▲11.98 |
| BJP | Dinesh Singh | 42,280 | 32.69 | ▼6.64 |
| AAP | Amit Singh Manto | 29,310 | 22.66 | ▲20.38 |
| SAD | Raj Kumar Gupta Bittu | 7,999 | 6.18 | ▲6.18 |
| NOTA | None of the above | 801 | 0.62 | ▼0.19 |
| Majority | | 4,636 | 3.58 | ▼11.33 |
| Turnout | | 129,339 | 77.34 | ▼1.51 |
| Registered electors | | 167,230 | | |
| INC gain from BJP | | Swing | | |

=== 2017 ===
Punjab Assembly election, 2017: Sujanpur
| Party | Candidate | Votes | % | ±% |
|---|---|---|---|---|
| BJP | Dinesh Singh | 48,910 | 39.33 | ▼6.09 |
| INC | Nazim Saifi | 30,209 | 24.29 | ▲3.57 |
| IND | Naresh Puri | 28,675 | 23.06 | ▼1.55 |
| RMPI | Natha Singh | 10,581 | 8.51 | new |
| AAP | Shariq Ali | 2,831 | 2.28 | new |
| NOTA | None of the above | 1,008 | 0.81 | −− |
| Majority | | 18,701 | 14.91 | |
| Turnout | | 125,369 | 78.85 | ▲1.56 |
| Registered electors | | | | |
| BJP hold | | Swing | | |

=== 2012 ===
Punjab Assembly election, 2012: Sujanpur
| Party | Candidate | Votes | % | ±% |
|---|---|---|---|---|
| BJP | Dinesh Singh | 50,408 | 45.42 | ▼1.21 |
| IND | Naresh Puri | 27,312 | 24.61 | −− |
| INC | Vinay Mahajan | 22,994 | 20.72 | ▼25,61 |
| BSP | Karnail Chand | 4,287 | 3.86 | ▲1.82 |
| CPI | Loveleen Chahal | 2,272 | 2.05 | −− |
| Majority | | 23,096 | 20.81 | |
| Turnout | | 110,978 | 77.29 | ▲0.54 |
| BJP hold | | Swing | | |

=== 2007 ===
Punjab Assembly election, 2007: Sujanpur
| Party | Candidate | Votes | % | ±% |
|---|---|---|---|---|
| BJP | Dinesh Singh | 51,984 | 46.63 | ▲10.71 |
| INC | Raghunath Sahai Puri | 51,656 | 46.33 | ▼11.08 |
| Majority | | 328 | 0.30 | |
| Turnout | | 111,476 | 76.75 | ▲9.98 |
| BJP gain from INC | | Swing | | |
