= Bhoa Assembly constituency =

Legislative Assembly constituency in Punjab State, India

Coordinates: 32.25°N 75.53°E

Bhoa
- Constituency No. 2 for the Punjab Legislative Assembly

Constituency details
- Country: India
- State: Punjab
- District: Pathankot
- Lok Sabha constituency: Gurdaspur
- Total electors: 182,915 (in 2022)
- Reservation: SC

Member of Legislative Assembly
- 16th Punjab Legislative Assembly
- Incumbent Lal Chand Kataruchakk
- Party: Aam Aadmi Party
- Elected year: 2022

Bhoa is a Punjab Legislative Assembly constituency in Pathankot district, Punjab state, India. It covers Bhoa village. In 2022, it had 182,915 electors.

== Members of the Legislative Assembly ==
Most successful parties from Bhoa Vidhan Sabha
1. AAP (1 Time) (33.3%)
2. BJP (1 Time) (33.3%)
3. INC (1 Time) (33.3%)

Year	Member	Party
2012	Seema Kumari	Bharatiya Janata Party
2017	Mohd Saud	Indian National Congress
2022	Lal Chand Kataruchakk	Aam Aadmi Party

== Election results ==
=== 2027 ===
Punjab Assembly election, 2027: Bhoa
Party	Candidate	Votes	%	±%
AAP	Mohd Asif		TBD	TBD
BJP	Mohd Shad	TBD	TBD	New entry
INC	Mohd Saud	TBD	TBD	
BSP	TBD	TBD	TBD	TBD
SAD	TBD	TBD	TBD	New entry
AD (WPD)	TBD	TBD	TBD	TBD
NOTA	None of the above			
Majority				
Turnout				

=== 2022 ===
Punjab Assembly election, 2022: Bhoa
Party	Candidate	Votes	%	±%
AAP	Lal Chand Kataruchakk	50,339	36.59	▲33.71
INC	Mohd Saud	49,135	35.72	▼14.43
BJP	Mohd Shad	29,132	21.18	▼9.72
BSP	Mohd Asif	5,046	3.67	▲3.14
NOTA	None of the above	749	0.54	▲0.19
Majority		1,204	0.87	
Turnout		137572		
Registered electors		182,915		
AAP gain from INC				

=== 2017 ===
Punjab Assembly election, 2017: Bhoa
Party	Candidate	Votes	%	±%
INC	Mohd saud	67,865	51.95	▲16.60
BJP	Mohd Shad	40,369	30.90	▼15.64
RMPI	Lal Chand Kataru Chak	13,353	10.22	New entry
AAP	Mohd Asif	3,767	2.88	New entry
NOTA	None of the above	454	0.35	−−
Majority		27,496	20.97	
Turnout		131,091	75.20	▲3.88
Registered electors		174,313		
INC gain from BJP		Swing		

=== 2012 ===
Punjab Assembly election, 2012: Bhoa
Party	Candidate	Votes	%	±%
BJP	Seema Kumari	50,503	46.54	New entry
INC	Balbir Ram	38,355	35.35	New entry
Independent	Ram Lal	7,508	6.92	New entry
Independent	Lal Chand	5,624	5.18	New entry
BSP	Amarjit Singh	2,841	2.62	New entry
CPI(M)	Gurdev Singh	2,779	2.56	New entry
Majority		12,148	11.19	
Turnout		108,512	71.32	New
BJP win (new seat)				
