= Master Mohan Lal =

Indian politician

MLA, Punjab
- In office 1985 - 1990
- Preceded by: Ram Sarup
- Succeeded by: Raman Kumar
- Constituency: Pathankot
- In office 1997 -2002
- Preceded by: Raman Kumar
- Succeeded by: Ashok Sharma
- Constituency: Pathankot
- In office 2007 -2012
- Preceded by: Ashok Sharma
- Succeeded by: Ashwani Kumar Sharma
- Constituency: Pathankot

Minister for Transport
- In office 2007-2012
- Chief Minister: Parkash Singh Badal
- Preceded by: Mohinder Singh Kaypee
- Succeeded by: Ajit Singh Kohar

Personal details
- Born: 9 August 1946 (age 80) Pathankot, Punjab, British India
- Party: Bharatiya Janta Party
- Spouse: Rewa Sharma
- Children: 2

Master Mohan Lal is an Indian politician and a member of Bharatiya Janta Party (BJP). He is a former Minister for Transport in Punjab Government.

== Early life ==
His father's name is Neel Kanth.

== Political career ==
He successfully contested election from Pathankot in 1985 as a BJP candidate. He was re-elected in 1997 and 2007. In 1997 he was made Minister of Forest, Law and legal affairs and also held department of higher education later on in the same tenure. In 2007, he was made Minister for Transport.
