= Kamal Sharma =

Indian politician (1970–2019)

Kamal Sharma (17 March 1970 – 27 October 2019) was an Indian political activist for the Rashtriya Swayamsevak Sangh and former political secretary to Chief Minister Parkash Singh Badal. In 2013, he was elected head of the Bharatiya Janata Party (BJP) for Punjab. He was replaced by Vijay Sampla on 8 April 2016 after having completed the mandated three-year term in January.
