= Seema Kumari =

Indian politician

Member of Punjab Legislative Assembly
- In office 2012–2017
- Preceded by: Post Established
- Succeeded by: Joginder Pal
- Constituency: Bhoa

Personal details
- Born: Pathankot, Punjab, India
- Party: Bharatiya Janata Party
- Spouse: Vinod Kumar

Seema Kumari is an Indian politician and a member of Bharatiya Janata Party (BJP).

== Personal life ==
Kumari is married to Vinod Kumar.

== Political career ==
Kumari was elected sarpanch of Lahri village in 2008 and in 2012 was elected to the Punjab Legislative Assembly from Bhoa, a constituency then reserved for candidates from Scheduled Castes and Scheduled Tribes. Then aged 33, she was the youngest member of the assembly.

Kumari stood as a candidate in the 2017 state assembly elections but faced criticism because of suspicions regarding an increase in her income. Described as the poorest MLA in the state in 2012, based on her declared assets in an election affidavit, they had grown almost 30-fold by 2017. She lost her seat in Bhoa to Joginder Pal of the Indian National Congress.
