= Sujanpur =

City in Punjab, India

Sujanpur City of the rivers
- City
- City Location in Punjab, India Sujanpur (India)
- Coordinates: 32.312743°N 75.601172°E
- India Country: India
- State: Punjab
- District: Pathankot

Government
  - Type: Municipality (City Administration)
  - Body: Municipal Council Sujanpur
  - Rank: 2nd in district

Population (2015)
  - Total: approximate 50,000
- Demonym: sujanpuria

Languages
- Time zone: UTC+5:30 (IST)
- Area code: 0186
- Vehicle registration: PB-35
- Website: Municipal Council of Sujanpur website

Sujanpur is a city and municipal council in the Pathankot district of the Indian state of Punjab. It is 06 km from Pathankot towards Jammu on Jalandhar-Jammu-Amritsar National Highway (NH-1A). It is situated near the banks of Ravi River and surrounded by two canals: UBDC and Bias Link. Sujanpur Municipal Council area is divided into 15 wards.

Sujanpur is the second most populous and largest urban area (शहरी क्षेत्र) in the district after Pathankot. Sujanpur features a large garment market as well as numerous international schools.

== Demographics ==
According to the 2015 Indian census, Sujanpur has a population of approximately 50,000 people. Men constitute 52% of the population and women 48%. Sujanpur has an average literacy rate of 71%, higher than the national average of 59.5%: male literacy is 75%, and female literacy is 66%. 12% of the population is under 6 years of age.

== Politics ==
The city is part of the Sujanpur, Punjab Assembly constituency.

== Transport ==
Sujanpur is well connected to the rest of the country by rail and road. It has direct train links with other Indian cities. All trains going to Jammu-Pathankot pass through Sujanpur Railway Station. Sujanpur is also connected by a fast network of private and public-sector bus services to other cities in Punjab, Himachal Pradesh, Delhi, Haryana, and Jammu & Kashmir. Important destinations include Delhi, Manali Chandigarh, Jammu, Dharamshala, Dalhousie, and Amritsar.

=== Airports close to Sujanpur ===
- Pathankot Airport (14.5 km)
- Amritsar Airport (116 km)
