= Pathankot district =

- District of Punjab
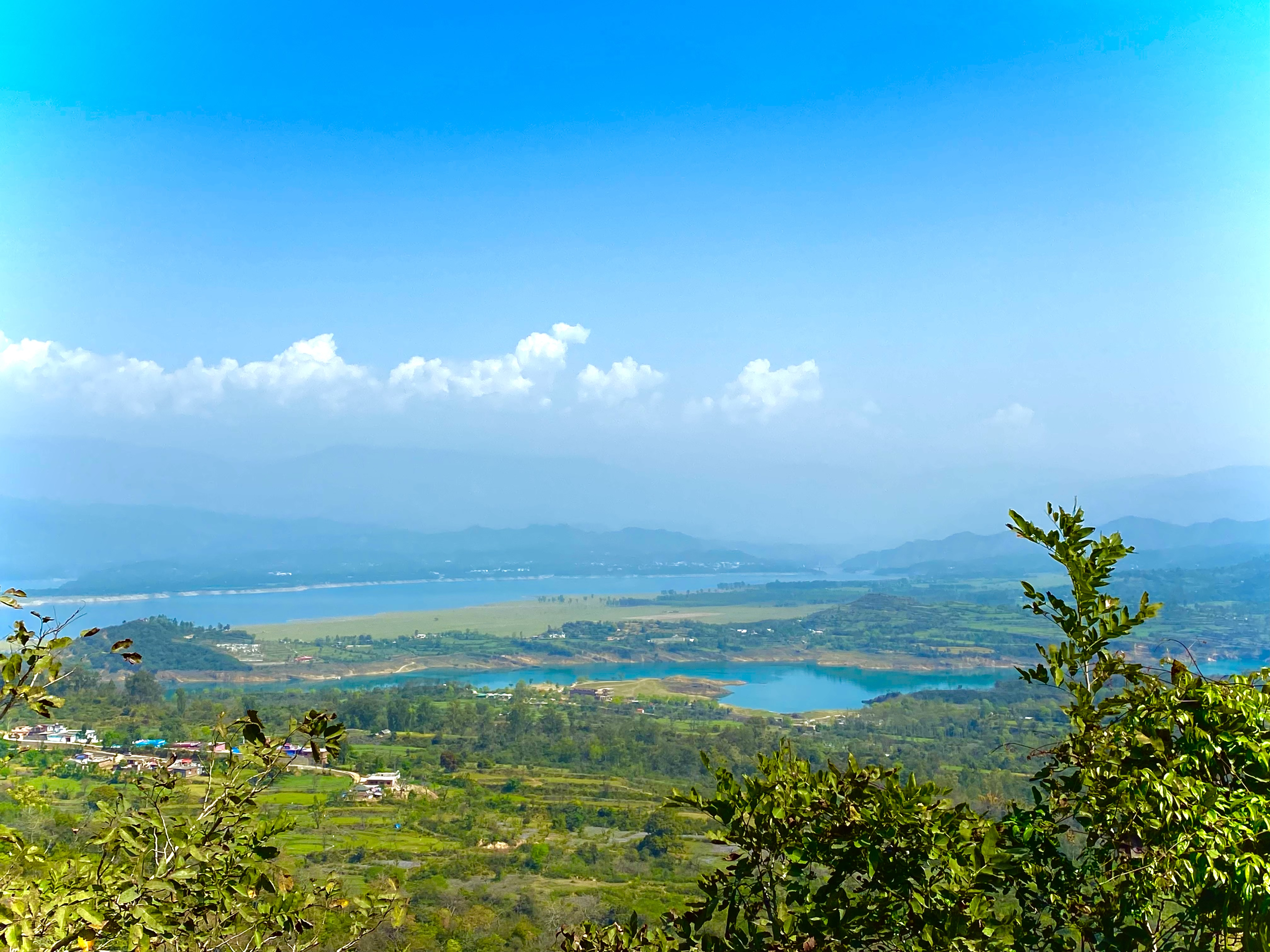

- Location in Punjab
- Coordinates: 32.266814°N 75.643444°E
- Country: India
- State: Punjab
- Named for: Pathania Rajput
- Headquarters: Pathankot

Government
  - Deputy commissioner: Sh. Ramveer
  - Senior Superintendent of Police: R.K. Bakshi (PPS)
  - Member of Parliament: Sukhjinder Singh Randhawa

Area
  - Total: 929 km^{2} (359 sq mi)

Population (2011)
  - Total: 676,598
  - Density: 728/km^{2} (1,890/sq mi)

Languages
  - Official: Punjabi
  - Other spoken: Dogri; Hindi
- Time zone: UTC+5:30 (IST)
- Vehicle registration: PB-35 / PB-68
- Largest City: Pathankot
- Website: https://pathankot.nic.in

Pathankot district, the northernmost district of Punjab, India, was formed on 27 July 2011, after being carved out from Gurdaspur district. Pathankot serves as the district headquarters. The district shares its borders with Narowal district of Punjab, Pakistan to the west and lies strategically close to the Union territory of Jammu & Kashmir, in which it shares border with Kathua district and in the state of Himachal Pradesh, shares its border with Chamba and Kangra districts, making it a vital trade and transportation hub in the region. The district is part of the Jalandhar division.

== Etymology ==
The original name of Pathankot was Paithan during Mughal times, which is in turn believed to be a derivative of Sanskrit Pratisthana. Later Paithan was retrieved again by Chandravanshi Rajput clan (Pathania “meaning No Pathans”) and named Pathankot. The suffix 'kot' stands for fort.

== Geography ==
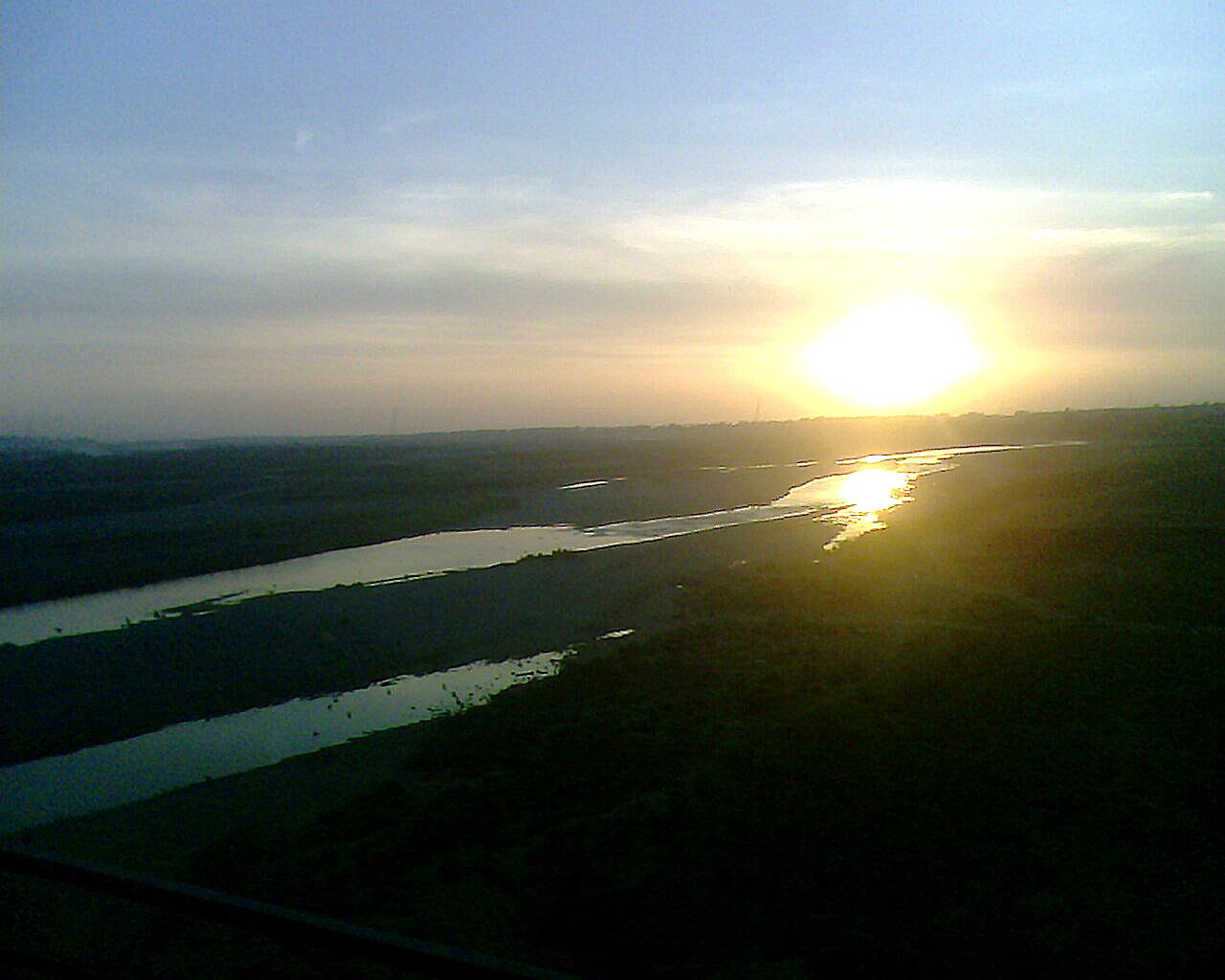
The Ravi river at Pathankot

Pathankot is located in the foothills of the Sivalik Hills. It shares international borders with the Narowal District of Pakistan's Punjab. It also shares borders with the Kathua District of Jammu and Kashmir and the Chamba and Kangra districts of Himachal Pradesh. Hoshiarpur district shares a boundary with Pathankot in Eastern Punjab. The two main rivers, – the Beas and the Ravi, pass through the district.

== Demographics ==
Religion in Pathankot district (2011)
Religion	Percent
Hinduism	88.42%
Sikhism	7.81%
Islam	2.12%
Christianity	1.08%
Other or not stated	0.57%

At the time of the 2011 census, the area that would become Pathankot district had a population of 676,598. Out of these 378,432 were rural and 298,166 urban. Pathankot has a sex ratio of 860 females per 1000 males. Scheduled Castes are 207,032 (30.60%) of the population.

Religion in Pathankot District (Note: Pathankot tehsil, which was later divided into Pathankot and Dhar Kalan tehsils)
Religion	Population (1941)	Percentage (1941)	Population (2011)	Percentage (2011)
Hinduism (Note: 1941 census: Including Ad-Dharmis)	83,330	54.42%	598,237	88.42%
Islam	59,548	38.89%	14,317	2.12%
Sikhism	7,580	4.95%	52,858	7.81%
Christianity	2,307	1.51%	7,292	1.08%
Others (Note: Including Jainism, Buddhism, Zoroastrianism, Judaism, or not stated)	369	0.24%	3,894	0.57%
Total Population	153,134	100%	676,598	100%

Languages of Pathankot (First Language) (2011)
1. Punjabi (89.9%)
2. Hindi (5.30%)
3. Dogri (1.20%)
4. Others (3.64%)

At the time of the 2011 census, 89.86% of the population spoke Punjabi, 5.30% Hindi and 1.20% Dogri as their first language.

== Governance and administration ==
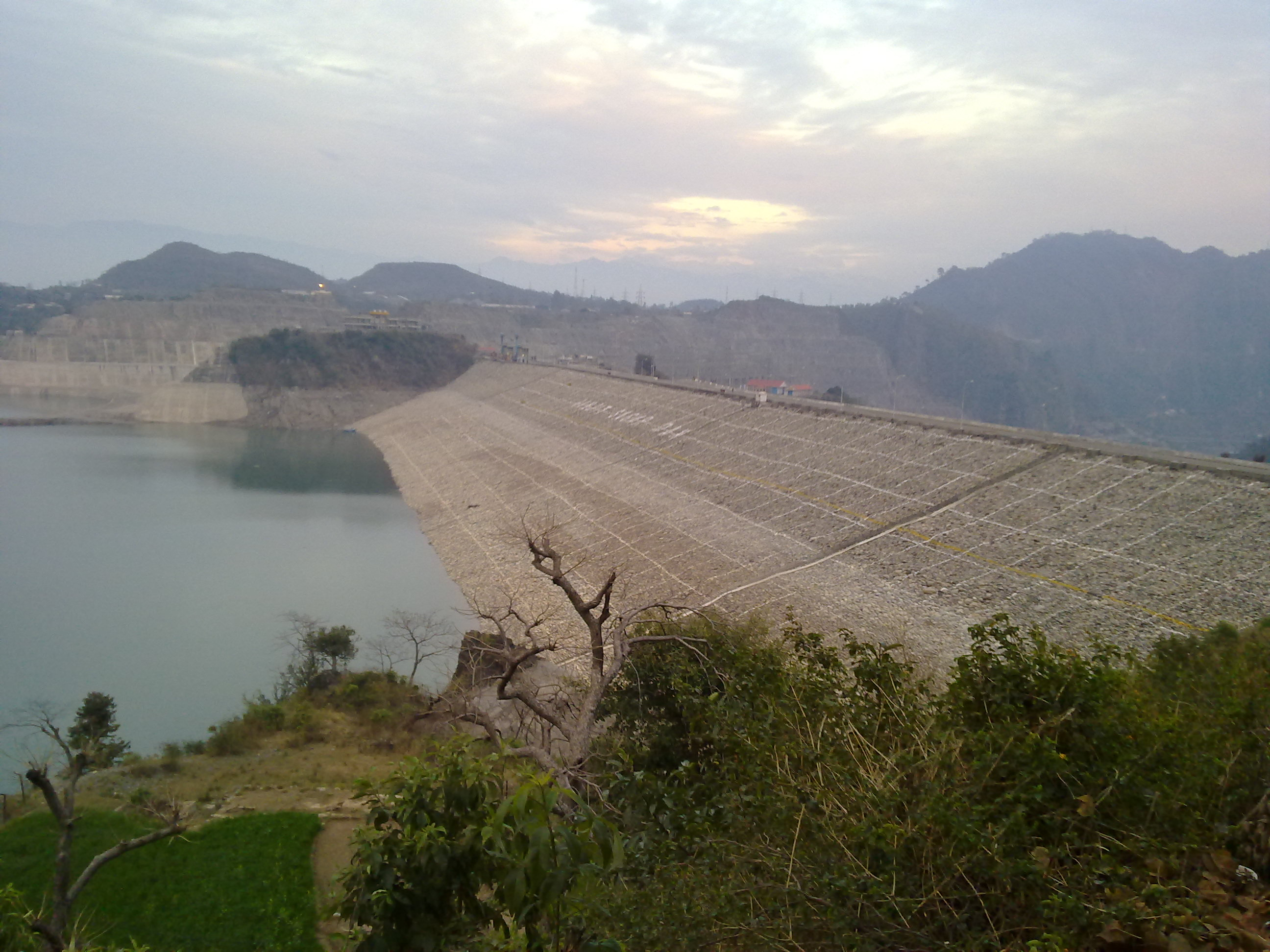
Ranjit Sagar dam over the Ravi river

In the past, It was a Tehsil of the district of Gurdaspur. The present district was formed, as the 22nd district of the state on 27 July 2011. Pathankot includes the two sub-divisions of Pathankot and Dhar Kalan and the two sub-tehsil of Narot Jaimal Singh and Bamial

=== Subdistricts of Pathankot district ===
According to the Indian government's integrated online directory, Pathankot district is divided into the following subdistricts (tehsils/subdivisions) and blocks:

- Subdistricts
  1. Dhar Kalan
  2. Pathankot
- Blocks:
  1. Bamial
  2. Dharkalan
  3. Gharota
  4. Narot Jaimal Singh
  5. Pathankot
  6. Sujanpur

=== City and towns ===
There are two statutory Cities Pathankot and Sujanpur in this district. The district also has 12 census towns, according to census 2011 which are listed below:

- Sujanpur (City Municipal Council)
- Pathankot (City Municipal Corporation)
- Jugial (Township)
- Narot Jaimal Singh (Nagar Panchayat)
- Narot Mehra (Town)
- Mamun (Pathankot Urban)
- Manwal (Town)
- Sarna (Pathankot Urban)
- Bungal (Rural Town)
- Malikpur (Pathankot Urban)
- Dunera (Town)
- Dhar Kalan (Town)
- Madhopur (Pathankot Urban)
- Gharota (Rural Town)
- Dhaki (Town)
- Daulatpur (Town)
- Jhakolari (Town)
- Kamini (Settlement)
- Mirthal (Town)
- Taragarh (Rural Town)

=== Other villages and settlements ===
- Abadgarh
- Kataruchak
- Mirthal, Near Beas river (Last town of Pathankot district)

=== Politics ===
Pathankot district is part of the Pathankot Assembly Constituency.

No.	Constituency	Name of MLA	Party	Bench
1	Sujanpur	Naresh Puri	Indian National Congress	Opposition
2	Bhoa (SC)	Lal Chand Kataruchakk	Aam Aadmi Party	Government
3	Pathankot	Ashwani Kumar Sharma	Bharatiya Janata Party	Opposition

== Healthcare ==
The table below shows the number of road accidents and people affected in Pathankot district by year.

Road accidents and people affected in Pathankot district by year
Year	Accidents	Killed	Injured	Vehicles Involved
2022	95	83	38	137
2021	131	85	46	139
2020	92	63	43	104
2019	115	97	44	112

== Notable people ==
- Ashwani Kumar Sharma (MLA)
- Seema Kumari (Ex MLA)
- Siddarth Kaul (Cricketer)

== See also ==
- Kathlaur Kushlian Wildlife Sanctuary, wildlife sanctuary in the district
