= Dhar Kalan =

- Village
- Location in Punjab, India Dhar Kalan (India)
- Coordinates: 32.4107214°N 75.7966358°E
- Country: India
- State: Punjab
- District: Pathankot
- Tehsil: Dhar Kalan

Government
  - Type: Panchayat raj
  - Body: Gram panchayat

Area
  - Total: 803 ha (1,980 acres)
- Elevation: 524 m (1,719 ft)

Population (2011)
  - Total: 1,441
  - Density: 179/km^{2} (465/sq mi)
  - Total Households: 266
- Sex ratio 721/690 ♂/♀

Languages
  - Official: Punjabi
- Time zone: UTC+5:30 (IST)
- PIN: 145022
- Telephone: 01870
- ISO 3166 code: IN-PB
- Vehicle registration: PB-68

Dhar Kalan is a village and administrative headquarter of Dhar Kalan tehsil in Pathankot district of Punjab State, India. It is located about 30 kilometres (19 mi) from district headquarter Pathankot and 260 kilometres (160 mi) from state capital Chandigarh. The village is administrated by Sarpanch an elected representative of the village.

Before formation of Pathankot district on 27 July 2011, Dhar Kalan along with Pathankot district was part of Gurdaspur district. For 2011 census it is listed under Gurdaspur district as census was completed before formation of the new district of Pathankot.

== Demography ==
As of 2011, the village had a total number of 266 houses and a population of 1441 of which 721 were males while 690 were females according to the report published by Census India in 2011. The literacy rate of the village is 82.67%, higher than the state average of 75.84%. The population of children under the age of 6 years is 159 which is 11.27% of total population of the village, and child sex ratio is approximately 1038 higher than the state average of 846.

Most of the people are from Schedule Caste which constitutes 17.43% of total population in the village. The town does not have any Schedule Tribe population so far.

As per census 2011, 425 people were engaged in work activities out of the total population of the village which includes 373 males and 52 females. According to census survey report 2011, 71.76% workers describe their work as main work and 28.24% workers are involved in marginal activity providing the livelihood for less than 6 months.

== Transport ==
The nearest train station is located 19 kilometres (12 mi) away in Dalhousie road and Sri Guru Ram Dass Jee International Airport is 155 kilometres (96 mi) away from the village. National Highway 154A passes through Dhar Kalan and provides connectivity to Punjab and Himachal Pradesh.

== See also ==
- List of villages in India
