= Pathankot =

Pathankot Paṭhānkōt Paithan
- City
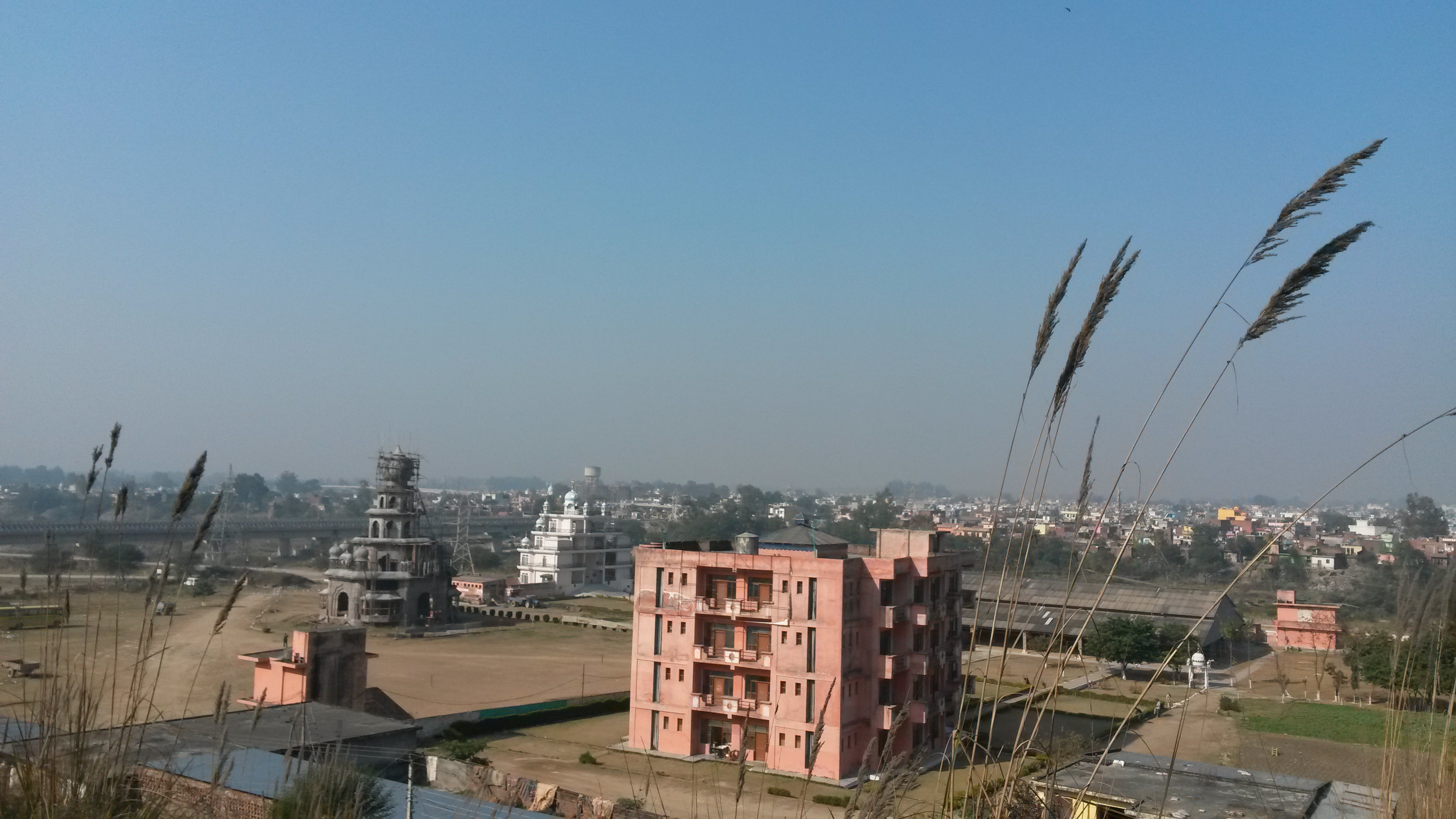
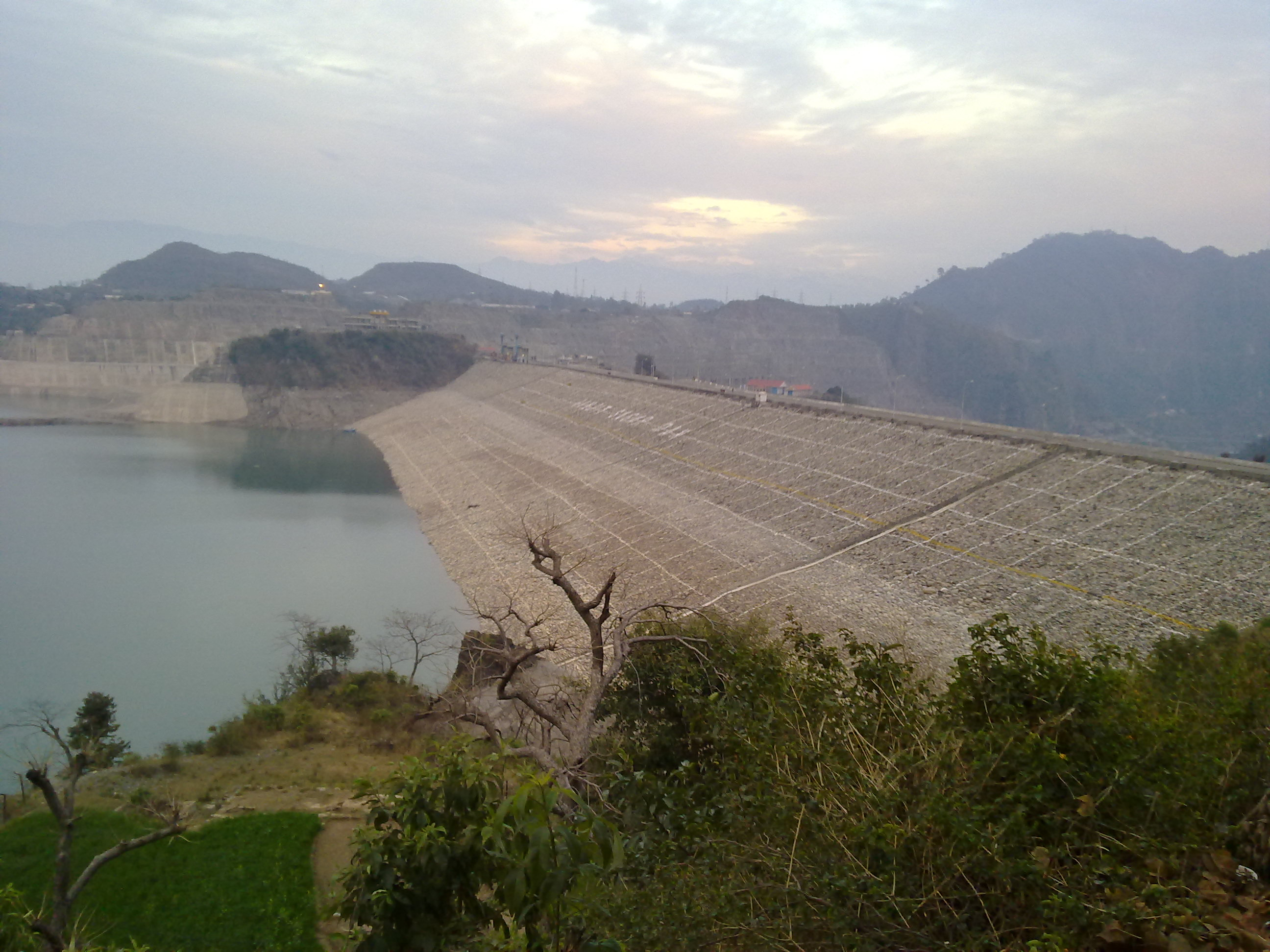
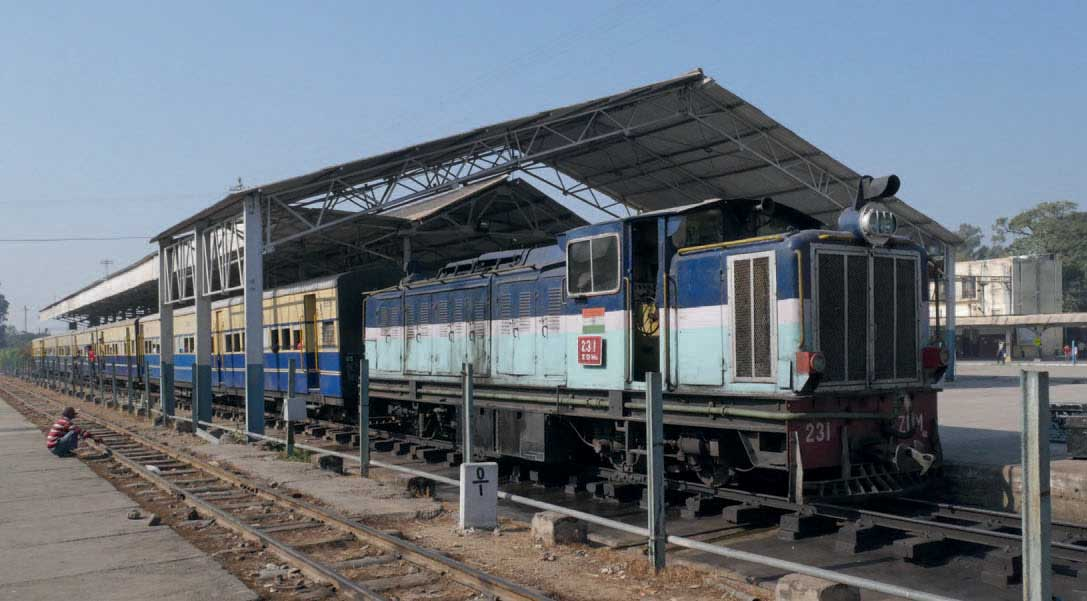
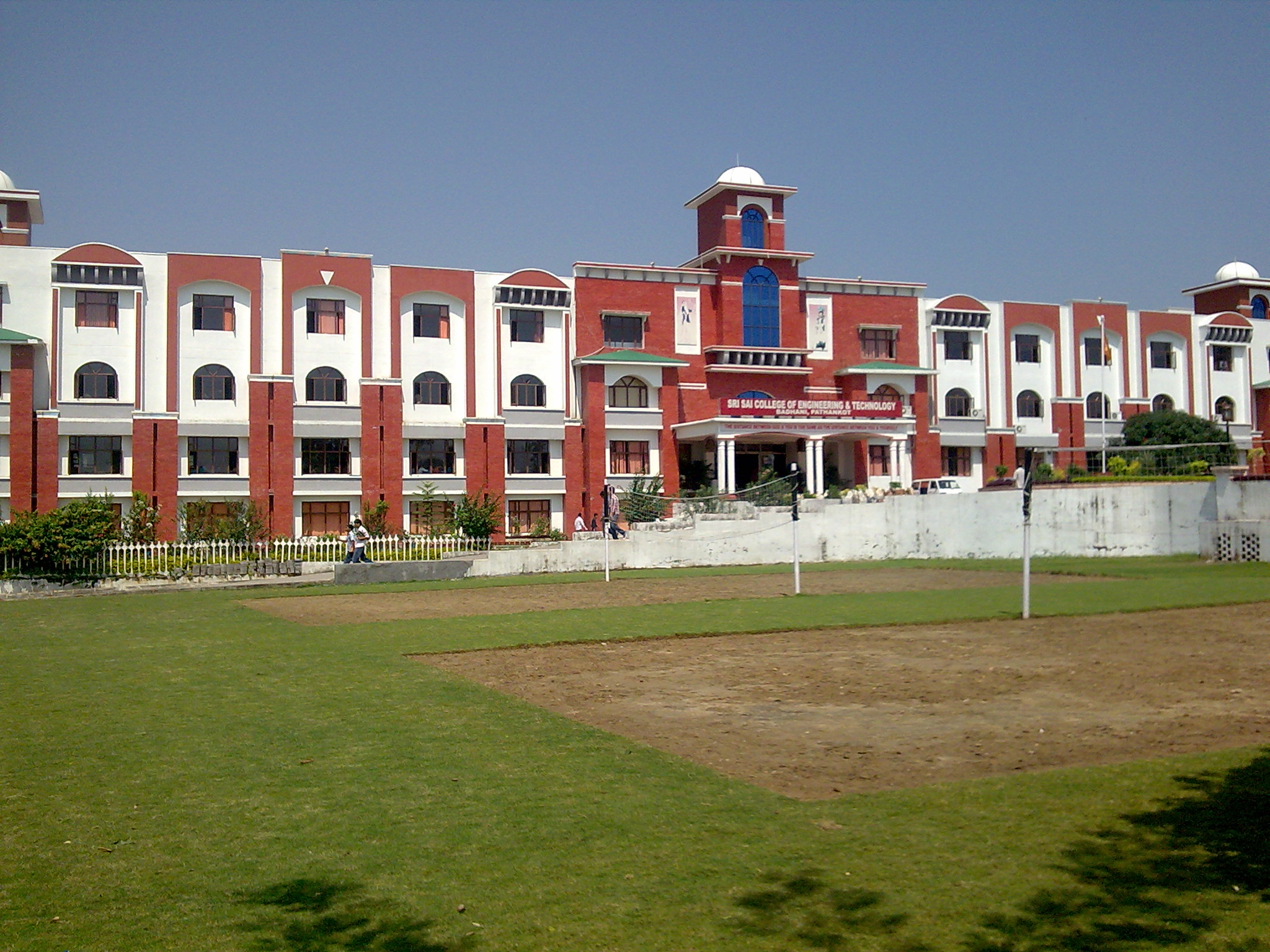
- Pathankot Skyline, Ranjit Sagar Dam, ZDM4A in Loco Shed at Pathankot Junction, Sri Sai College
- Nickname: Gateway to Himachal
- Location in Punjab, India Pathankot (India)
- Coordinates: 32°16′10″N 75°39′07″E
- Country: India
- State: Punjab
- District: Pathankot
- Established: In 16th Century
- Named for: Pathania clan

Government
  - Body: Municipal Corporation
  - Deputy Commissioner: Sh. Sanyam Aggarwal, I A S.

Area
  - Total: 19.7 km^{2} (7.6 sq mi)
  - Rank: 6th
- Elevation: 332 m (1,089 ft)

Population (2011)
  - Total: 249,000(approx250,000 include sub-urban)
- Demonym: Pathankotia

Languages
  - Official: Punjabi
  - Native: Punjabi; Pahari
- Time zone: UTC+5:30 (IST)
- Pin Code: 145001
- Telephone code: 0186
- Vehicle registration: PB-35
- Website: https://pathankot.nic.in/

Pathankot (Punjabi pronunciation: [pə.ʈʰäːn.koːʈᵊ]) is a city and the district headquarters of the Pathankot district in Punjab, India. Pathankot is the sixth most populous city of Punjab, after Ludhiana, Amritsar, Jalandhar, Patiala and Bathinda. Its local government is a municipal corporation. Pathankot is located in the northern-most part of Punjab and lies closely to the Kangra district of Himachal Pradesh. Pathankot is also known as Gateway to Himachal as it is situated with very close proximity to Himachal Pradesh.

== Etymology ==
The name of the city, Pathankot, is named after Pathanias who were the chieftains of Nurpur Kingdom, as Pathankot was the former capital of Nurpur Kingdom. The organiser of the Archaeological Survey of India, Alexander Cunningham, held that the fort of Pathankot was originally built during the ancient period of India.

== History ==
=== Ancient period ===
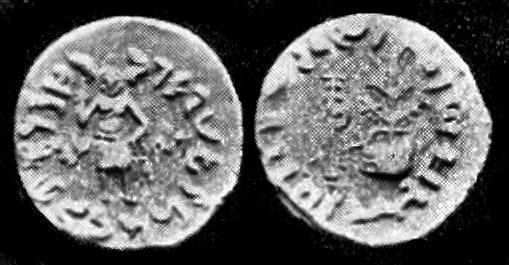
Coin of Dharaghosha, king of the Audumbaras, in the Indo-Greek style, circa 100 BCE. Obv: Standing figure, probably of Vishvamitra, Kharoshthi legend, around: Mahadevasa Dharaghoshasa/Odumbarisa "Great Lord King Dharaghosha/Prince of Audumabara", across: Viçvamitra "Vishvamitra". Rev: Trident battle-axe, tree with railing, Brahmi legend identical in content to the obverse.

In the Mahabharata and in the works of Sanskrit grammarian and linguistic scholar Panini, the region is also mentioned as Audumbara, which was classified as Ayudhajivi sangha (warrior community).

Numerous coins of great antiquity related to Ancient Audumbara Kingdom were found at various sites of Pathankot.

=== Medieval Period ===
In the medieval period from 11th century CE to the 16th century, Pathankot was the first capital of Nurpur State (present-day Himachal Pradesh), which was earlier known as Dhameri, a corruption of Audumbari.

In Mughal India, Pathankot's name was changed from Dhameri to Nurpur during Shah Jahan's reign. The Pathania clan of native Pahadi Rajputs of the region derived its name from Pathankot, which was known as Paithan.

Under the Sikh Empire in India, Pathankot was invaded by Jarnail Jai Singh Kanhaiya of Kanhaiya Misl and was annexed from the ruling Pathania Rajput clan and merged with Punjab during Maharaja Ranjit Singh's rule. Moran Sarkar, a Muslim dancing girl Ranjit Singh married, lived in a fortress in Pathankot from 1811 till her demise.

=== Colonial period ===
During the colonial era of India, Pathankot was merged with Gurdaspur district in 1853; prior to that, it was part of Kangra after British annexed the hill regions from Sikhs after the First Anglo-Sikh War in 1845.

=== After independence ===
During partition, the initial plan by the border demarcation committee was to place Pathankot (part of Gurdaspur district that time) in Pakistan and Shakargarh district in India. However, Shakargarh district was finally given to Pakistan and Gurdaspur district (along with Pathankot) was given to India.

== Geography ==
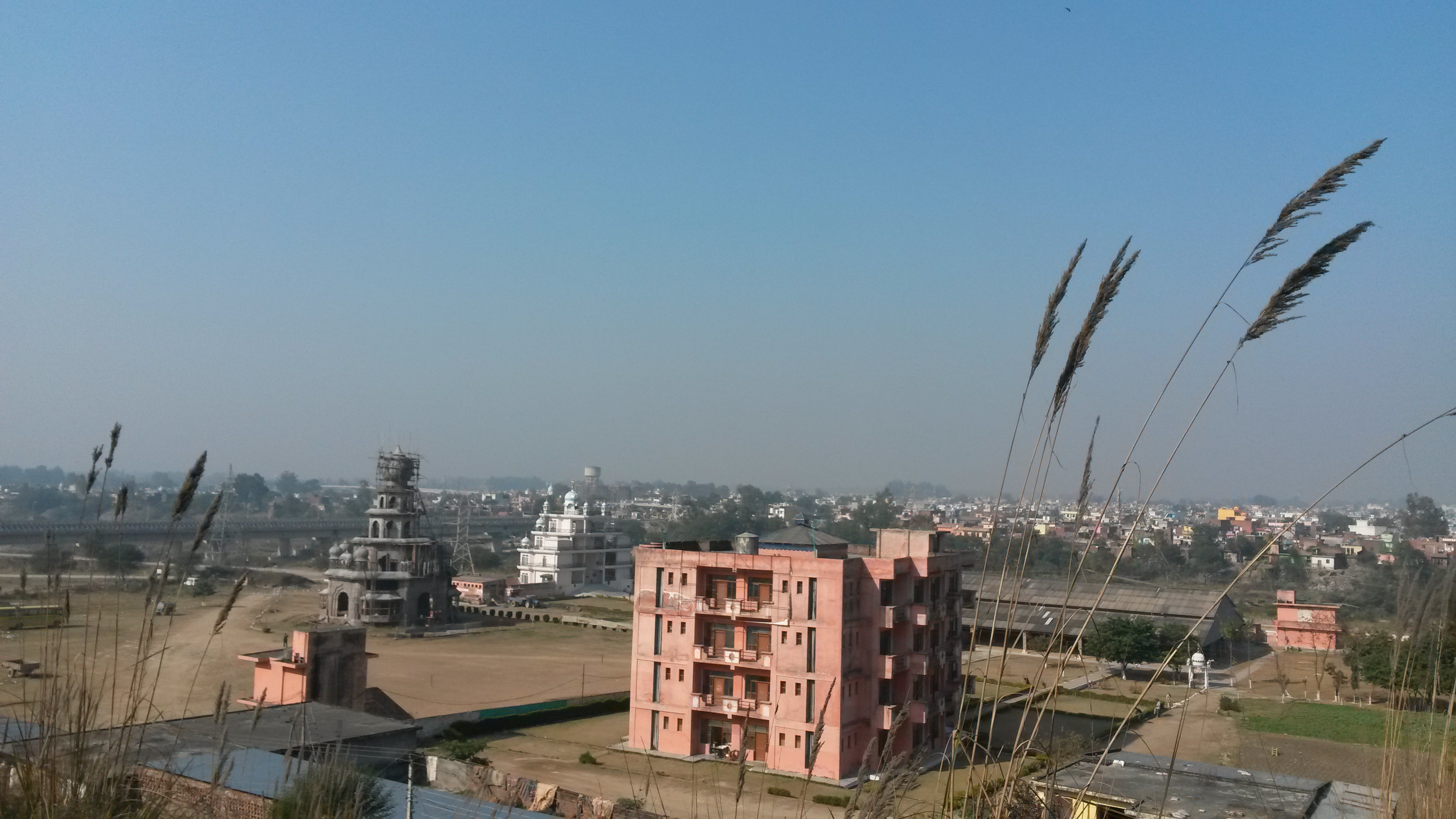
Pathankot City

Pathankot has an average elevation of 332 metres (1,089 ft). It is a green town surrounded by the Ravi and Chakki rivers. Shiwalik foothills on the south and east and snow-capped Himalayas in the back drop in north.

=== Average temperature ===
- Spring: The climate remains the most enjoyable part of the year during the spring season (from mid-February to mid-April). Temperatures vary between (max) 16 °C to 25 °C and (min) 9 °C to 18 °C.
- Autumn: In autumn (from mid-September to mid November.), the temperature may rise to a maximum of 30 °C. Temperatures usually remain between 16° and 27° in autumn. The minimum temperature is around 11 °C.
- Summer: The temperature in summer (from mid-May to mid-June) may rise to a maximum of 46 °C (rarely). Temperatures generally remain between 34 and 46 °C (93 and 115 °F).
- Monsoon: During monsoon(from mid-June to mid-September), Pathankot receives moderate to heavy rainfall and sometimes heavy to very heavy rainfall (generally during the month of August or September). Usually, the rain bearing monsoon winds blow from south-west/ south-east. Mostly, the city receives heavy rain from south (which is mainly a persistent rain) but it generally receives most of its rain during monsoon either from North-west or North-east. Maximum amount of rain received by the city of Pathankot during monsoon season is 195.5 mm in a single day.
- Winter: Winters (November to mid-March) are mild but it can sometimes get quite chilly in Pathankot. Average temperatures in the winter remain at (max) 7 °C to 15 °C and (min) 0 °C to 8 °C. Rain usually comes from the west during winters and it is usually a persistent rain for 2–3 days with sometimes hail-storms. Pathankot experienced snowfall in 2012 after almost 55 years.

Climate data for Pathankot
Month	Jan	Feb	Mar	Apr	May	Jun	Jul	Aug	Sep	Oct	Nov	Dec	Year
Record high °C (°F)	28 (82)	29 (84)	35 (95)	43 (109)	46 (115)	49 (120)	46 (115)	41 (106)	40 (104)	40 (104)	35 (95)	29 (84)	49 (120)
Mean daily maximum °C (°F)	18 (64)	21 (70)	26 (79)	33 (91)	37 (99)	39 (102)	34 (93)	33 (91)	33 (91)	31 (88)	25 (77)	19 (66)	29 (84)
Mean daily minimum °C (°F)	8 (46)	11 (52)	16 (61)	22 (72)	26 (79)	29 (84)	28 (82)	28 (82)	26 (79)	21 (70)	14 (57)	9 (48)	20 (68)
Record low °C (°F)	−4 (25)	0 (32)	4 (39)	10 (50)	15 (59)	19 (66)	19 (66)	20 (68)	19 (66)	9 (48)	4 (39)	−1 (30)	−4 (25)
Average precipitation mm (inches)	71 (2.8)	80 (3.1)	81 (3.2)	46 (1.8)	34 (1.3)	78 (3.1)	356 (14.0)	370 (14.6)	140 (5.5)	25 (1.0)	16 (0.6)	38 (1.5)	1,335 (52.5)
Average precipitation days	5	7	8	5	3	4	12	13	8	2	1	3	71

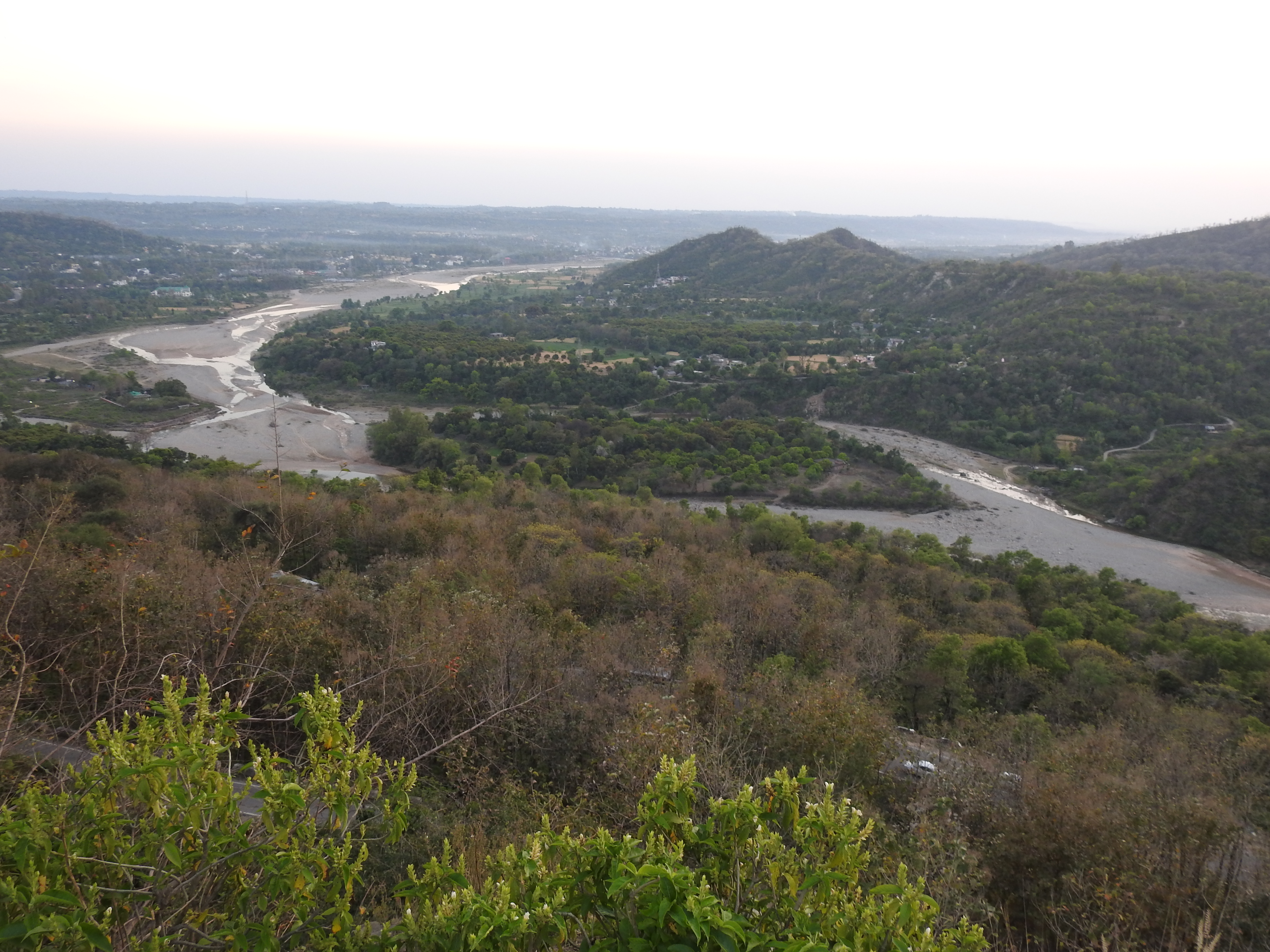
View of Ravi river (approaching Pathankot) from Nurpur fort in Himachal Pradesh

Pathankot/Dera Baba has been ranked 26th best “National Clean Air City” under (Category 3 population under 3 lakhs cities) in India.

== Politics ==
The city is part of the Pathankot Assembly Constituency.

== Facilities ==
Government of Pathankot had constructed 4 public toilets in 2018. You can find them at various places where they charge you 10/- but you can avail general conveniences in a clean environment. In 2026, there were 25 toilets installed by the local business association.

== Transport ==
Pathankot is connected by rail and road with the rest of the country. Pathankot is connected by a network of private and public-sector bus services to other cities in Punjab, Himachal Pradesh, Delhi, Haryana, Jammu and Kashmir, mainly which include Delhi, Shimla, Manali, Chandigarh, Jammu, Dharamshala, Dalhousie and Amritsar. Pathankot is used as a gateway for Chamba and Kangra Valley in Himachal Pradesh and for various locations in Jammu and Kashmir like Jammu, Mansar Lake, Surinsar Lake, Udhampur, Holy Cave at Amarnath and Mata Vaishno Devi, Katra which is about 158 km away from Pathankot.

Traffic management is poor in the city. No traffic lights exist in the city.

=== By Air ===
- Pathankot Airport is a domestic airport serving Pathankot with scheduled flight operations to/from New Delhi by Alliance Air under the UDAN Scheme. The nearest International Airport, is in Amritsar.

=== Train ===
Pathankot Railway Station under A-category. Pathankot is a major railroad junction. Lines from Amritsar (2 hrs) and Delhi (8 hrs) merge here, and all services to Jammu (2 hrs) pass through. In addition to Pathankot station itself, there is a second station called Chakki Bank renamed Pathankot Cantt 4 km away, which serves some express trains that do not stop in Pathankot station. Nowadays the majority of the Jammu trains stop only at Pathankot Cantt Railway Station and not at Pathankot Railway Station.

Pathankot has direct train links with Delhi, Jammu and other Indian cities. All trains going to Jammu pass through Pathankot Cantt Station. Trains include Rajdhani, Swaraj Express, Pooja Express, Shri Shakti Express. Super fast trains do not serve Pathankot Station. The distance from Pathankot & Pathankot Cant Railway station is 4 km.

Pathankot is also served by the narrow-gauge Kangra Valley Railway (a.k.a. Kangra Toy Train) built by the British, which travels 128 km to Joginder Nagar via Palampur and Kangra (near Dharamsala)., The luxury Kangra Queen services were terminated in 2003, leaving about six departures daily of slow, often crowded second class trains, taking over six hours. Bookings for these can only be done in-person at Pathankot station. Some of these trains run to Baijnath Paprola and a few to Joginder Nagar. The main stations on this line include Kangra and Palampur. The town is the lower terminus of the Kangra Valley Railway, thereby connecting the mountainous regions of western Himachal Pradesh to the network of Indian Railways.

=== Bus ===
Maharana Pratap Inter State Bus Terminal Pathankot is close to Pathankot railway station. Public buses to Dharamshala and Dalhousie take 3–4 hours. while buses to Amritsar take 3 hours. Dalhousie, a famous destination which is about 80 km from Pathankot. The Hindu Pilgrimage Vaishno devi is 158 km from Pathankot. Chandigarh is 4–5 hours away. It is well connected with bus services from Himachal Roadways, Punjab Roadways, Haryana Roadways, J&K Transport, and Private AC Volvo buses.

One can stop over in Pathankot en route to Gurdaspur (35 km), Mukerian (40), Joginder Nagar (149 km), Dharamshala (88 km), Dalhousie (100 km), Amritsar (108), Palampur (112 km), Chamba (100 km) & Jammu (100 km), Hoshiarpur (100 km), Kangra (86 km), Jalandhar (108 km), Shimla (296 km), Srinagar (400 km) all in different directions from Pathankot via Jalandhar-Srinagar National highway (NH-44), Dabwali-Pathankot National highway (NH-54) and Pathankot-Mandi National highway (NH-154).

== Economy ==
Pathankot’s economy is primarily driven by agriculture, trade, and transportation. The region is known for producing crops like wheat, maize, and litchi, benefiting from its fertile soil and favorable climate. Its strategic location makes it a key trading hub connecting Punjab with Jammu & Kashmir and Himachal Pradesh. Small-scale industries, local trade markets, and tourism also contribute significantly to the city’s economic activities.

Litchi Production

Pathankot is a key litchi-growing region in Punjab, with a seasonal harvest in late spring. Its litchi cultivation supports local farmers and contributes to exports. The Punjab government has taken initiatives to boost horticulture and enhance market access, addressing challenges like pests and price fluctuations to improve productivity and profitability.

== Demographics ==
As per data of 2011 census Pathankot urban agglomeration had a population of 159,909, out of which males were 84,145 and females were 75,764. The literacy rate was 88.71 per cent.

Religion in Pathankot City
Religion	Percent
Hinduism	88.89%
Sikhism	8.05%
Christianity	1.73%
Islam	0.38%
Others	0.95%

Most common language here is Punjabi, Pahari and Hindi.

== Notable sites ==
Keshopur Chhamb is home to many Migratory Birds and is only major natural wetland in the state.

- There is a fortress called the Nurpur Fort in Kangra district of Himachal Pradesh built by the Pathania Rajputs, more than 900 years ago. The temple is also built there named Brij Raj Swami devoted to Lord Krishna and Mira Bai, the only place where idols of both are worshipped. It was damaged due to the earthquake which struck in 1905 A.D., 25 km from Pathankot. It is 25 km away from Pathankot.

The Union Ministry for Forests, Environment and Climate Change has given the long-awaited signal to develop the twin islands of Kalara and Palangi, located in the midst of the Ranjit Sagar Dam Lake.

== Notable people ==
- Amanpreet Ahluwalia (racing driver)
- Dev Anand (actor)
- Sunny Deol (MP)
- Siddarth Kaul (cricketer)
- Jagmohan Kaur (singer)
- Vinod Khanna (MP)
- Master Mohan Lal (Ex. MLA)
- Rajindar Nath Rehbar (poet (Shaayar in Urdu) and lyricist)
- Rajbeer Singh (actor)
