= List of sub-districts of Punjab, India =

At a sub-district level, the fourth-level of administrative division and below, the state of Punjab, India is divided into tehsils for administrative purposes. Tehsils are further divided into sub-tehsils. Recent figures are 98 tehsils and 83 sub-tehsils. Furthermore, there are 152 blocks. The previous divisions fall under districts and ultimately, divisions. Tehsils and sub-divisions are mostly analogous to one another. Blocks comprise different territorial boundaries than tehsils.

== Overview ==
Republic of India
States and Union Territories (e.g. Punjab State)
Division (e.g. Jalandhar division)
District (e.g. Gurdaspur district)
Sub-district (e.g. Dera Baba Nanak tehsil)
Sub-sub-district (e.g. sub-tehsil, community development block, etc.)
Local governing systems (e.g. revenue village, panchayat, municipal corporation, etc.)

The districts of Punjab are subdivided into tehsils, which have fiscal and administrative powers over settlements within their borders, including maintenance of local land records comes under the administrative control of a tehsildar. Each tehsil consists of blocks which are over 150 in number total. Each block comprises a block development and panchayat office (BDPO Office/BDO) and Block Samiti, headed by a block development and panchayat officer (BDPO) and executive officer of Block Samiti. Elected politically is a chairman of the blocksamiti. These blocks consist of Revenue Villages. There are a total number of 12,278 revenue villages in the state. As per Sunita Kaler, Punjab is a state in which there is little or no difference between tehsils and sub-divisions as they share the same boundaries as one another, unlike some other Indian states where these two terms refer to distinct administrative schemes. In India, the tehsil and talukas are important for land records and land revenue. Subdivisions and tehsils are headed by Sub-divisional magistrates (SDMs, selected from the State Civil Services/Punjab Civil Services) and Tehsildars (a revenue officer), respectively. Sub-tehsils are headed by a headed by a naib tehsildar.

== List of tehsils ==
Number	NIC Tehsil Code	Subdistrict (tehsil)	District (zilla)	Division (mandal)
1	-	Adampur	Jalandhar district	Jalandhar division
2	4333	Jalandhar-I	Jalandhar district	Jalandhar division
3	4334	Jalandhar-II	Jalandhar district	Jalandhar division
4	4331	Nakodar	Jalandhar district	Jalandhar division
5	4332	Phillaur	Jalandhar district	Jalandhar division
6	4330	Shahkot	Jalandhar district	Jalandhar division
7	4317	Batala	Gurdaspur district	Jalandhar division
8	4318	Dera Baba Nanak	Gurdaspur district	Jalandhar division
9	-	Dina Nagar	Gurdaspur district	Jalandhar division
10	-	Fatehgarh Churian	Gurdaspur district	Jalandhar division
11	4316	Gurdaspur	Gurdaspur district	Jalandhar division
12		Kalanaur	Gurdaspur district	Jalandhar division
13	6050	Dhar Kalan	Pathankot district	Jalandhar division
14	6051	Pathankot	Pathankot district	Jalandhar division
15	4319	Ajnala	Amritsar district	Jalandhar division
16	4320	Amritsar-I	Amritsar district	Jalandhar division
17	4321	Amritsar-II	Amritsar district	Jalandhar division
18	4325	Baba Bakala	Amritsar district	Jalandhar division
19	-	Majitha	Amritsar district	Jalandhar division
20	-	Lopoke	Amritsar district	Jalandhar division
21	-	Bhikhiwind	Tarn Taran district	Jalandhar division
22	6055	Khadur Sahib	Tarn Taran district	Jalandhar division
23	6054	Patti	Tarn Taran district	Jalandhar division
24	6053	Tarn Taran	Tarn Taran district	Jalandhar division
25	4326	Bhulath	Kapurthala district	Jalandhar division
26	4327	Kapurthala	Kapurthala district	Jalandhar division
27	4329	Phagwara	Kapurthala district	Jalandhar division
28	4328	Sultanpur Lodhi	Kapurthala district	Jalandhar division
29	4335	Dasua	Hoshiarpur district	Jalandhar division
30	4338	Garhshankar	Hoshiarpur district	Jalandhar division
31	4337	Hoshiarpur	Hoshiarpur district	Jalandhar division
32	4336	Mukerian	Hoshiarpur district	Jalandhar division
33	-	Tanda	Hoshiarpur district	Jalandhar division
34	-	Dudhan Sadhan	Patiala district	Patiala division
35	4382	Nabha	Patiala district	Patiala division
36	4383	Patiala	Patiala district	Patiala division
37	6431	Patran	Patiala district	Patiala division
38	4384	Rajpura	Patiala district	Patiala division
39	4381	Samana	Patiala district	Patiala division
40	-	Bhawanigarh	Sangrur district	Patiala division
41	-	Dirba	Sangrur district	Patiala division
42	-	Dhuri	Sangrur district	Patiala division
43	-	Lehra	Sangrur district	Patiala division
44	4380	Moonak	Sangrur district	Patiala division
45	4378	Sangrur	Sangrur district	Patiala division
46	4379	Sunam	Sangrur district	Patiala division
47	6231	Barnala	Barnala district	Patiala division
48	-	Mehal Kalan	Barnala district	Patiala division
49	-	Tapa	Barnala district	Patiala division
50	4347	Amloh	Fatehgarh Sahib district	Patiala division
51	4345	Bassi Pathana	Fatehgarh Sahib district	Patiala division
52	4346	Fatehgarh Sahib	Fatehgarh Sahib district	Patiala division
53	4348	Khamanon	Fatehgarh Sahib district	Patiala division
54	-	Amargarh	Malerkotla district	Patiala division
55	-	Ahmedgarh	Malerkotla district	Patiala division
56	-	Malerkotla	Malerkotla district	Patiala division
57	4355	Jagraon	Ludhiana district	Patiala division
58	4350	Khanna	Ludhiana district	Patiala division
59	4352	Ludhiana (East)	Ludhiana district	Patiala division
60	4353	Ludhiana (West)	Ludhiana district	Patiala division
61	4351	Payal	Ludhiana district	Patiala division
62	4354	Raikot	Ludhiana district	Patiala division
63	4349	Samrala	Ludhiana district	Patiala division
64	4360	Firozpur	Firozpur district	Firozpur division
65	6427	Guru Harsahai	Firozpur district	Firozpur division
66	4359	Zira	Firozpur district	Firozpur division
67	4357	Bagha Purana	Moga district	Firozpur division
68	-	Dharamkot	Moga district	Firozpur division
69	4358	Moga	Moga district	Firozpur division
70	4356	Nihal Singh Wala	Moga district	Firozpur division
71	4365	Gidderbaha	Sri Muktsar Sahib district	Firozpur division
72	4364	Malout	Sri Muktsar Sahib district	Firozpur division
73	4366	Sri Muktsar Sahib	Sri Muktsar Sahib district	Firozpur division
74	6062	Abohar	Fazilka district	Firozpur division
75	6061	Fazilka	Fazilka district	Firozpur division
76	6060	Jalalabad	Fazilka district	Firozpur division
77	4367	Faridkot	Faridkot district	Faridkot division
78	4368	Jaito	Faridkot district	Faridkot division
79	-	Kot Kapura	Faridkot district	Faridkot division
80	4370	Bathinda	Bathinda district	Faridkot division
81	4369	Rampura Phul	Bathinda district	Faridkot division
82	4371	Talwandi Sabo	Bathinda district	Faridkot division
83	-	Maur	Bathinda district	Faridkot division
84	4373	Budhlada	Mansa district	Faridkot division
85	4374	Mansa	Mansa district	Faridkot division
86	4372	Sardulgarh	Mansa district	Faridkot division
87	4341	Anandpur Sahib	Rupnagar district	Rupnagar division
88	6424	Chamkaur Sahib	Rupnagar district	Rupnagar division
89	6425	Morinda	Rupnagar district	Rupnagar division
90	-	Nangal	Rupnagar district	Rupnagar division
91	6227	Rupnagar	Rupnagar district	Rupnagar division
92	6059	S.A.S. Nagar (Mohali)	Mohali district	Rupnagar division
93	6209	Dera Bassi	Mohali district	Rupnagar division
94	6058	Kharar	Mohali district	Rupnagar division
95	-	Banur	Mohali district	Rupnagar division
96	6057	Balachaur	Shaheed Bhagat Singh Nagar district	Rupnagar division
97	-	Banga	Shaheed Bhagat Singh Nagar district	Rupnagar division
98	-	Nawanshahr	Shaheed Bhagat Singh Nagar district	Rupnagar division

== List of sub-tehsils ==
Number	Sub-tehsil (up-tehsil)	District (zilla)	Division (mandal)
1	Bhogpur	Jalandhar district	Jalandhar division
2	Goraya	Jalandhar district	Jalandhar division
3	Kartarpur	Jalandhar district	Jalandhar division
4	Lohian	Jalandhar district	Jalandhar division
5	Mehatpur	Jalandhar district	Jalandhar division
6	Nurmahal	Jalandhar district	Jalandhar division
7	Dhariwal	Gurdaspur district	Jalandhar division
8	Dorangla	Gurdaspur district	Jalandhar division
9	Kahnuwan	Gurdaspur district	Jalandhar division
10	Naushehra Majha Singh	Gurdaspur district	Jalandhar division
11	Qadian	Gurdaspur district	Jalandhar division
12	Sri Hargobindpur	Gurdaspur district	Jalandhar division
13	Bamial	Pathankot district	Jalandhar division
14	Narot Jaimal Singh	Pathankot district	Jalandhar division
15	Atari	Amritsar district	Jalandhar division
16	Jandiala Guru	Amritsar district	Jalandhar division
17	Raja Sansi	Amritsar district	Jalandhar division
18	Ramdas	Amritsar district	Jalandhar division
19	Tarsika	Amritsar district	Jalandhar division
20	Bias	Amritsar district	Jalandhar division
21	Chohla Sahib	Tarn Taran district	Jalandhar division
22	Goindwal Sahib	Tarn Taran district	Jalandhar division
23	Harike	Tarn Taran district	Jalandhar division
24	Jhabal	Tarn Taran district	Jalandhar division
25	Khem Karan	Tarn Taran district	Jalandhar division
26	Naushehra Pannuan	Tarn Taran district	Jalandhar division
27	Dhilwan	Kapurthala district	Jalandhar division
28	Talwandi Chaudhrian	Kapurthala district	Jalandhar division
29	Bhunga	Hoshiarpur district	Jalandhar division
30	Garhdiwala	Hoshiarpur district	Jalandhar division
31	Hajipur	Hoshiarpur district	Jalandhar division
32	Mahalpur	Hoshiarpur district	Jalandhar division
33	Sham Chaurasi	Hoshiarpur district	Jalandhar division
34	Talwara	Hoshiarpur district	Jalandhar division
35	Hariana	Hoshiarpur district	Jalandhar division
36	Bhadson	Patiala district	Patiala division
37	Ghanaur	Patiala district	Patiala division
38	Cheema	Sangrur district	Patiala division
39	Khanauri	Sangrur district	Patiala division
40	Longowal	Sangrur district	Patiala division
41	Sherpur	Sangrur district	Patiala division
42	Bhadaur	Barnala district	Patiala division
43	Dhanaula	Barnala district	Patiala division
44	Mandi Gobindgarh	Fatehgarh Sahib district	Patiala division
45	Chanarthal Kalan	Fatehgarh Sahib district	Patiala division
–	none	Malerkotla district	Patiala division
46	Dehlon	Ludhiana district	Patiala division
47	Kum Kalan	Ludhiana district	Patiala division
48	Machhiwara	Ludhiana district	Patiala division
49	Malaud	Ludhiana district	Patiala division
50	Mullanpur Dakha	Ludhiana district	Patiala division
51	Sahnewal	Ludhiana district	Patiala division
52	Sidhwan Bet	Ludhiana district	Patiala division
53	Ludhiana (North)	Ludhiana district	Patiala division
54	Makhu	Firozpur district	Firozpur division
55	Mallanwala	Firozpur district	Firozpur division
56	Mamdot	Firozpur district	Firozpur division
57	Talwandi Bhai	Firozpur district	Firozpur division
58	Ajeetwal	Moga district	Firozpur division
59	Badhni Kalan	Moga district	Firozpur division
60	Kot Ise Khan	Moga district	Firozpur division
61	Smalsar	Moga district	Firozpur division
62	Bariwala	Muktsar district	Firozpur division
63	Doda	Muktsar district	Firozpur division
64	Lakhewali	Muktsar district	Firozpur division
65	Lambi	Muktsar district	Firozpur division
66	Arniwala Sheikh Subhan	Fazilka district	Firozpur division
67	Khuian Sarwar	Fazilka district	Firozpur division
68	Sito Guno	Fazilka district	Firozpur division
69	Sadiq	Faridkot district	Faridkot division
70	Balian Wali	Bathinda district	Faridkot division
71	Bhagta Bhaika	Bathinda district	Faridkot division
72	Goniana	Bathinda district	Faridkot division
73	Nathana	Bathinda district	Faridkot division
74	Sangat	Bathinda district	Faridkot division
75	Bareta	Mansa district	Faridkot division
76	Bhikhi	Mansa district	Faridkot division
77	Jhunir	Mansa district	Faridkot division
78	Joga	Mansa district	Faridkot division
79	Nurpur Bedi	Rupnagar district	Rupnagar division
80	Gharuan	Mohali district	Rupnagar division
81	Majri	Mohali district	Rupnagar division
82	Zirakpur	Mohali district	Rupnagar division
83	Aur	Shaheed Bhagat Singh Nagar district	Rupnagar division

== List of blocks ==
Number	Block (khaḍa)	District (zilla)	Division (mandal)
1	Adampur	Jalandhar district	Jalandhar division
2	Bhogpur	Jalandhar district	Jalandhar division
3	Jalandhar (East)	Jalandhar district	Jalandhar division
4	Jalandhar (West)	Jalandhar district	Jalandhar division
5	Lohian	Jalandhar district	Jalandhar division
6	Mehatpur	Jalandhar district	Jalandhar division
7	Nakodar	Jalandhar district	Jalandhar division
8	Nurmahal	Jalandhar district	Jalandhar division
9	Phillaur	Jalandhar district	Jalandhar division
10	Rurka Kalan	Jalandhar district	Jalandhar division
11	Shahkot	Jalandhar district	Jalandhar division
12	Batala	Gurdaspur district	Jalandhar division
13	Dera Baba Nanak	Gurdaspur district	Jalandhar division
14	Dhariwal	Gurdaspur district	Jalandhar division
15	Dina Nagar	Gurdaspur district	Jalandhar division
16	Dorangla	Gurdaspur district	Jalandhar division
17	Fatehgarh Churian	Gurdaspur district	Jalandhar division
18	Gurdaspur	Gurdaspur district	Jalandhar division
19	Kahnuwan	Gurdaspur district	Jalandhar division
20	Kalanaur	Gurdaspur district	Jalandhar division
21	Qadian	Gurdaspur district	Jalandhar division
22	Sri Hargobindpur	Gurdaspur district	Jalandhar division
23	Bamial	Pathankot district	Jalandhar division
24	Dhar Kalan	Pathankot district	Jalandhar division
25	Gharota	Pathankot district	Jalandhar division
26	Narot Jaimal Singh	Pathankot district	Jalandhar division
27	Pathankot	Pathankot district	Jalandhar division
28	Sujanpur	Pathankot district	Jalandhar division
29	Ajnala	Amritsar district	Jalandhar division
30	Atari	Amritsar district	Jalandhar division
31	Chaugawan	Amritsar district	Jalandhar division
32	Harsha Chhina	Amritsar district	Jalandhar division
33	Jandiala Guru	Amritsar district	Jalandhar division
34	Majitha	Amritsar district	Jalandhar division
35	Rayya	Amritsar district	Jalandhar division
36	Tarsika	Amritsar district	Jalandhar division
37	Verka	Amritsar district	Jalandhar division
38	Bhikhiwind	Tarn Taran district	Jalandhar division
39	Chohla Sahib	Tarn Taran district	Jalandhar division
40	Gandiwind	Tarn Taran district	Jalandhar division
41	Khadur Sahib	Tarn Taran district	Jalandhar division
42	Naushehra Pannuan	Tarn Taran district	Jalandhar division
43	Patti	Tarn Taran district	Jalandhar division
44	Tarn Taran	Tarn Taran district	Jalandhar division
45	Valtoha	Tarn Taran district	Jalandhar division
46	Dhilwan	Kapurthala district	Jalandhar division
47	Kapurthala	Kapurthala district	Jalandhar division
48	Nadala	Kapurthala district	Jalandhar division
49	Phagwara	Kapurthala district	Jalandhar division
50	Sultanpur Lodhi	Kapurthala district	Jalandhar division
51	Bhunga	Hoshiarpur district	Jalandhar division
52	Dasua	Hoshiarpur district	Jalandhar division
53	Garhshankar	Hoshiarpur district	Jalandhar division
54	Hajipur	Hoshiarpur district	Jalandhar division
55	Hoshiarpur-I	Hoshiarpur district	Jalandhar division
56	Hoshiarpur-II	Hoshiarpur district	Jalandhar division
57	Mahalpur	Hoshiarpur district	Jalandhar division
58	Mukerian	Hoshiarpur district	Jalandhar division
59	Talwara	Hoshiarpur district	Jalandhar division
60	Tanda	Hoshiarpur district	Jalandhar division
61	Bhunerheri	Patiala district	Patiala division
62	Ghanaur	Patiala district	Patiala division
63	Nabha	Patiala district	Patiala division
64	Patiala	Patiala district	Patiala division
65	Patran	Patiala district	Patiala division
66	Rajpura	Patiala district	Patiala division
67	Samana	Patiala district	Patiala division
68	Sanaur	Patiala district	Patiala division
69	Shambu Kalan	Patiala district	Patiala division
70	Andana	Sangrur district	Patiala division
71	Bhawanigarh	Sangrur district	Patiala division
72	Dhuri	Sangrur district	Patiala division
73	Dirba	Sangrur district	Patiala division
74	Lehragaga	Sangrur district	Patiala division
75	Sangrur	Sangrur district	Patiala division
76	Sherpur	Sangrur district	Patiala division
77	Sunam	Sangrur district	Patiala division
78	Barnala	Barnala district	Patiala division
79	Mehal Kalan	Barnala district	Patiala division
80	Sehna	Barnala district	Patiala division
81	Amloh	Fatehgarh Sahib district	Patiala division
82	Bassi Pathana	Fatehgarh Sahib district	Patiala division
83	Khamanon	Fatehgarh Sahib district	Patiala division
84	Khera	Fatehgarh Sahib district	Patiala division
85	Sirhind	Fatehgarh Sahib district	Patiala division
86	Ahmedgarh	Malerkotla district	Patiala division
87	Amargarh	Malerkotla district	Patiala division
88	Malerkotla	Malerkotla district	Patiala division
89	Dehlon	Ludhiana district	Patiala division
90	Doraha	Ludhiana district	Patiala division
91	Jagraon	Ludhiana district	Patiala division
92	Khanna	Ludhiana district	Patiala division
93	Ludhiana-I	Ludhiana district	Patiala division
94	Ludhiana-II	Ludhiana district	Patiala division
95	Machhiwara	Ludhiana district	Patiala division
96	Malaud	Ludhiana district	Patiala division
97	Pakhowal	Ludhiana district	Patiala division
98	Raikot	Ludhiana district	Patiala division
99	Samrala	Ludhiana district	Patiala division
100	Sidhwan Bet	Ludhiana district	Patiala division
101	Sudhar	Ludhiana district	Patiala division
102	Firozpur	Firozpur district	Firozpur division
103	Ghall Khurd	Firozpur district	Firozpur division
104	Guru Harsahai	Firozpur district	Firozpur division
105	Makhu	Firozpur district	Firozpur division
106	Mamdot	Firozpur district	Firozpur division
107	Zira	Firozpur district	Firozpur division
108	Bagha Purana	Moga district	Firozpur division
109	Dharamkot	Moga district	Firozpur division
110	Moga-I	Moga district	Firozpur division
111	Moga-II	Moga district	Firozpur division
112	Nihal Singh Wala	Moga district	Firozpur division
113	Kot Bhai	Muktsar district	Firozpur division
114	Lambi	Muktsar district	Firozpur division
115	Malout	Muktsar district	Firozpur division
116	Sri Muktsar Sahib	Muktsar district	Firozpur division
117	Abohar	Fazilka district	Firozpur division
118	Arniwala Sheikh Subhan	Fazilka district	Firozpur division
119	Fazilka	Fazilka district	Firozpur division
120	Jalalabad	Fazilka district	Firozpur division
121	Khuian Sarwar	Fazilka district	Firozpur division
122	Faridkot	Faridkot district	Faridkot division
123	Jaitu	Faridkot district	Faridkot division
124	Kot Kapura	Faridkot district	Faridkot division
125	Bathinda	Bathinda district	Faridkot division
126	Bhagta Bhaika	Bathinda district	Faridkot division
127	Goniana Mandi	Bathinda district	Faridkot division
128	Maur	Bathinda district	Faridkot division
129	Nathana	Bathinda district	Faridkot division
130	Phul	Bathinda district	Faridkot division
131	Rampura	Bathinda district	Faridkot division
132	Sangat	Bathinda district	Faridkot division
133	Talwandi Sabo	Bathinda district	Faridkot division
134	Bhikhi	Mansa district	Faridkot division
135	Budhlada	Mansa district	Faridkot division
136	Jhunir	Mansa district	Faridkot division
137	Mansa	Mansa district	Faridkot division
138	Sardulgarh	Mansa district	Faridkot division
139	Anandpur Sahib	Rupnagar district	Rupnagar division
140	Chamkaur Sahib	Rupnagar district	Rupnagar division
141	Morinda	Rupnagar district	Rupnagar division
142	Nurpur Bedi	Rupnagar district	Rupnagar division
143	Rupnagar	Rupnagar district	Rupnagar division
144	Dera Bassi	Mohali district	Rupnagar division
145	Kharar	Mohali district	Rupnagar division
146	Majri	Mohali district	Rupnagar division
147	Mohali	Mohali district	Rupnagar division
148	Aur	Shaheed Bhagat Singh Nagar district	Rupnagar division
149	Balachaur	Shaheed Bhagat Singh Nagar district	Rupnagar division
150	Banga	Shaheed Bhagat Singh Nagar district	Rupnagar division
151	Saroya	Shaheed Bhagat Singh Nagar district	Rupnagar division
152	Nawanshahr	Shaheed Bhagat Singh Nagar district	Rupnagar division

== See also ==
- Divisions of Punjab, India
- List of districts of Punjab, India
