= Government of Punjab, India =

Indian state government

Government of Punjab
- Seat of Government: Chandigarh

Legislative branch
- Assembly: Punjab Vidhan Sabha
- Speaker: Kultar Singh Sandhwan
- Deputy Speaker: Jai Krishan Singh
- Members in Assembly: 117

Executive branch
- Governor: Gulab Chand Kataria
- Chief Minister: Bhagwant Mann
- Chief Secretary: K.A.P. Sinha, IAS

Judiciary
- High Court: Punjab & Haryana High Court
- Chief Justice: Hon'ble Mr. Justice Ashwani Mishra
- Seat: Chandigarh

The Government of Punjab or locally as the State Government, is the supreme governing authority of the Indian state of Punjab, India and its 23 districts. It consists of an executive, led by the Governor of Punjab, a judiciary and a legislative branch Punjab State.

Like other states in India, the head of state of Punjab is the Punjab Governor, appointed by the President of India on the advice of the Central government. The post of governor is largely ceremonial. The Chief Minister of Punjab is the head of government and is vested with most of the executive powers. Chandigarh is the capital of Punjab, and houses the Vidhan Sabha (Legislative Assembly) and the secretariat. Chandigarh also serves as the capital of Haryana, and is a union territory of India. The Punjab & Haryana High Court, located in Chandigarh, has jurisdiction over the whole state.

The present Punjab Legislative Assembly is unicameral, consisting of 117 Member of Legislative Assembly (MLA). Its term is 5 years, unless sooner dissolved.

== Cabinet Ministers ==
=== Minister of State ===
Portfolio	Minister	Took office	Left office	Party	Ref
Chief Minister; Civil Aviation; Cooperation; General Administration; Home Affairs & Justice; Legal & Legislative Affairs; Personnel and Training; Sports and Youth Services; Science Technology & Environment; Vigilance; Other departments not allocated to any Minister	Bhagwant Mann	16 March 2022	Incumbent	AAP	
Economic & Statistical Organisation; Excise & Taxation; Finance; Planning; Programme Implementation	Harpal Singh Cheema	21 March 2022	Incumbent	AAP	
Employment Generation and Training; Governance Reforms and Public Grievances; New and Renewable Energy Sources; Printing & Stationery	Aman Arora	5 July 2022	Incumbent	AAP	
Social Justice, Empowerment & Minorities; Social Security and Development of Women and Children	Baljit Kaur	21 March 2022	Incumbent	AAP	
Elections; Health and Family Welfare; Medical Education and Research	Dr. Balbir Singh	7 January 2023	Incumbent	AAP	
Food, Civil Supplies & Consumer Affairs; Forest and Wild Life Preservation	Lal Chand Kataruchakk	21 March 2022	Incumbent	AAP	
Jails; Transport	Laljit Singh Bhullar	21 March 2022	Incumbent	AAP	
Higher Education and Languages; Information & Public Relations; School Education; Technical Education & Industrial Training	Harjot Singh Bains	21 March 2022	Incumbent	AAP	
Power; Public Works	Harbhajan Singh ETO	21 March 2022	Incumbent	AAP	
Agriculture and Farmer Welfare; Animal Husbandry, Fisheries & Dairy Development; Food Processing	Gurmeet Singh Khudian	31 May 2023	Incumbent	AAP	
Defence Services Welfare; Freedom Fighters; Horticulture	Mohinder Bhagat	23 September 2024	Incumbent	AAP	
Hospitality; Labour; Rural Development & Panchayats; Tourism & Culture Affairs	Tarunpreet Singh Sond	23 September 2024	Incumbent	AAP	
Local Government; Parliamentary Affairs	Ravjot Singh	23 September 2024	Incumbent	AAP	
Conservation of Soil and Water; Mines & Geology; Water Resources	Barinder Kumar Goyal	23 September 2024	Incumbent	AAP	
Housing and Urban Development; Revenue, Rehabilitation and Disaster Management; Water Supply & Sanitation	Hardeep Singh Mundian	23 September 2024	Incumbent	AAP	
Investment Promotion; Industries & Commerce; NRI Affairs	Sanjeev Arora (politician)	3 July 2025	Incumbent	AAP	

=== By departments ===
An alphabetical list of all the departments of Punjab Government with terms :

Portfolio	Minister	Took office	Left office
Agriculture and Farmer Welfare	Bhagwant Mann	16 March 2022	5 July 2022
Agriculture and Farmer Welfare	Kuldeep Singh Dhaliwal	5 July 2022	31 May 2023
Agriculture and Farmer Welfare	Gurmeet Singh Khudian	31 May 2023	Incumbent
Animal Husbandry, Dairy Development and Fisheries	Kuldeep Singh Dhaliwal	21 March 2022	5 July 2022
Animal Husbandry, Dairy Development and Fisheries	Laljit Singh Bhullar	5 July 2022	31 May 2023
Animal Husbandry, Dairy Development and Fisheries	Gurmeet Singh Khudian	31 May 2023	Incumbent
Civil Aviation	Bhagwant Mann	16 March 2022	Incumbent
Conservation of Soil & Water	Bhagwant Mann	16 March 2022	5 July 2022
Conservation of Soil & Water	Inderbir Singh Nijjar	5 July 2022	31 May 2023
Conservation of Soil & Water	Gurmeet Singh Meet Hayer	31 May 2023	21 November 2023
Conservation of Soil & Water	Chetan Singh Jauramajra	21 November 2023	23 September 2024
Conservation of Soil & Water	Barinder Kumar Goyal	23 September 2024	Incumbent
Cooperation	Harpal Singh Cheema	21 March 2022	5 July 2022
Cooperation	Bhagwant Mann	5 July 2022	Incumbent
Defence Services Welfare	Bhagwant Mann	16 March 2022	5 July 2022
Defence Services Welfare	Fauja Singh Sarari	5 July 2022	7 January 2023
Defence Services Welfare	Chetan Singh Jauramajra	7 January 2023	23 September 2024
Defence Services Welfare	Mohinder Bhagat	23 September 2024	Incumbent
Economic & Statistical Organisation	Harpal Singh Cheema	16 March 2022	Incumbent
Elections	Bhagwant Mann	16 March 2022	5 July 2022
Elections	Chetan Singh Jauramajra	5 July 2022	7 January 2023
Elections	Dr. Balbir Singh	7 January 2023	Incumbent
Employment Generation and Training	Bhagwant Mann	16 March 2022	16 March 2023
Employment Generation and Training	Aman Arora	16 March 2023	Incumbent
Excise and Taxation	Harpal Singh Cheema	21 March 2022	Incumbent
Finance	Harpal Singh Cheema	21 March 2022	Incumbent
Food, Civil Supplies and Consumer Affairs	Lal Chand Kataruchakk	21 March 2022	Incumbent
Food Processing	Bhagwant Mann	16 March 2022	5 July 2022
Food Processing	Fauja Singh Sarari	5 July 2022	7 January 2023
Food Processing	Chetan Singh Jauramajra	7 January 2023	16 March 2023
Food Processing	Laljit Singh Bhullar	16 March 2023	31 May 2023
Food Processing	Gurmeet Singh Khudian	31 May 2023	Incumbent
Forest and Wild Life Preservation	Lal Chand Kataruchakk	21 March 2022	Incumbent
General Administration	Bhagwant Mann	16 March 2022	Incumbent
Governance Reforms and Public Grievances	Bhagwant Mann	16 March 2022	5 July 2022
Governance Reforms and Public Grievances	Gurmeet Singh Meet Hayer	5 July 2022	16 March 2023
Governance Reforms and Public Grievances	Aman Arora	16 March 2023	Incumbent
Health & Family Welfare	Vijay Singla	21 March 2022	24 May 2022
Health & Family Welfare	Bhagwant Mann	24 May 2022	5 July 2022
Health & Family Welfare	Chetan Singh Jauramajra	5 July 2022	7 January 2023
Health & Family Welfare	Dr. Balbir Singh	7 January 2023	Incumbent
Higher Education and Languages	Gurmeet Singh Meet Hayer	21 March 2022	7 January 2023
Higher Education and Languages	Harjot Singh Bains	7 January 2023	Incumbent
Home Affairs and Justice	Bhagwant Mann	16 March 2022	Incumbent
Horticulture	Bhagwant Mann	16 March 2022	5 July 2022
Horticulture	Fauja Singh Sarari	5 July 2022	7 January 2023
Horticulture	Chetan Singh Jauramajra	7 January 2023	23 September 2024
Horticulture	Mohinder Bhagat	23 September 2024	Incumbent
Hospitality	Laljit Singh Bhullar	21 March 2022	5 July 2022
Hospitality	Bhagwant Mann	5 July 2022	7 January 2023
Hospitality	Anmol Gagan Maan	7 January 2023	23 September 2024
Hospitality	Tarunpreet Singh Sond	23 September 2024	Incumbent
Housing and Urban Development	Bhagwant Mann	16 March 2022	5 July 2022
Housing and Urban Development	Aman Arora	5 July 2022	16 March 2023
Housing and Urban Development	Bhagwant Mann	16 March 2023	23 September 2024
Housing and Urban Development	Hardeep Singh Mundian	23 September 2024	Incumbent
Industries and Commerce	Bhagwant Mann	16 March 2022	23 September 2024
Industries and Commerce	Tarunpreet Singh Sond	23 September 2024	3 July 2025
Industries and Commerce	Sanjeev Arora (politician)	3 July 2025	Incumbent
Information and Public Relation	Bhagwant Mann	16 March 2022	5 July 2022
Information and Public Relation	Aman Arora	5 July 2022	16 March 2023
Information and Public Relation	Chetan Singh Jauramajra	16 March 2023	23 September 2024
Information and Public Relation	Harjot Singh Bains	23 September 2024	Incumbent
Information Technology	Bhagwant Mann	16 March 2022	Incumbent
Investment Promotion	Bhagwant Mann	16 March 2022	5 July 2022
Investment Promotion	Anmol Gagan Maan	5 July 2022	23 September 2024
Investment Promotion	Tarunpreet Singh Sond	23 September 2024	Incumbent
Jails	Harjot Singh Bains	21 March 2022	7 January 2023
Jails	Bhagwant Mann	7 January 2023	23 September 2024
Jails	Laljit Singh Bhullar	23 September 2024	Incumbent
Labour	Bhagwant Mann	16 March 2022	5 July 2022
Labour	Anmol Gagan Maan	5 July 2022	23 September 2024
Labour	Tarunpreet Singh Sond	23 September 2024	Incumbent
Legal and Legislative Affairs	Harjot Singh Bains	21 March 2022	5 July 2022
Legal and Legislative Affairs	Bhagwant Mann	5 July 2022	Incumbent
Local Government	Bhagwant Mann	16 March 2022	5 July 2022
Local Government	Inderbir Singh Nijjar	5 July 2022	31 May 2023
Local Government	Balkar Singh	31 May 2023	23 September 2024
Local Government	Ravjot Singh	23 September 2024	Incumbent
Mines & Geology	Harjot Singh Bains	21 March 2022	7 January 2023
Mines & Geology	Gurmeet Singh Meet Hayer	7 January 2023	21 November 2023
Mines & Geology	Chetan Singh Jauramajra	21 November 2023	23 September 2024
Mines & Geology	Barinder Kumar Goyal	23 September 2024	Incumbent
Medical Education and Research	Vijay Singla	21 March 2022	24 May 2022
Medical Education and Research	Bhagwant Mann	24 May 2022	5 July 2022
Medical Education and Research	Chetan Singh Jauramajra	5 July 2022	7 January 2023
Medical Education and Research	Dr. Balbir Singh	7 January 2023	Incumbent
New & Renewable Energy Sources	Bhagwant Mann	16 March 2022	5 July 2022
New & Renewable Energy Sources	Aman Arora	5 July 2022	Incumbent
NRI Affairs	Kuldeep Singh Dhaliwal	21 March 2022	3 July 2025
NRI Affairs	Sanjeev Arora (politician)	3 July 2025	Incumbent
Parliamentary Affairs	Bhagwant Mann	16 March 2022	5 July 2022
Parliamentary Affairs	Inderbir Singh Nijjar	5 July 2022	31 May 2023
Parliamentary Affairs	Balkar Singh	31 May 2023	23 September 2024
Parliamentary Affairs	Ravjot Singh	23 September 2024	Incumbent
Personnel and Training	Bhagwant Mann	16 March 2022	Incumbent
Planning	Harpal Singh Cheema	21 March 2022	Incumbent
Power	Harbhajan Singh ETO	21 March 2022	Incumbent
Printing and Stationery	Bhagwant Mann	16 March 2022	5 July 2022
Printing and Stationery	Gurmeet Singh Meet Hayer	5 July 2022	13 January 2023
Printing and Stationery	Aman Arora	13 January 2023	Incumbent
Program Implementation	Harpal Singh Cheema	21 March 2022	Incumbent
Public Works	Harbhajan Singh ETO	21 March 2022	Incumbent
Punjab Energy Development Agency	Bhagwant Mann	16 March 2022	Incumbent
Removal of Grievances	Bhagwant Mann	21 March 2022	5 July 2022
Removal of Grievances	Anmol Gagan Maan	5 July 2022	16 March 2023
Removal of Grievances	Aman Arora	16 March 2023	Incumbent
Revenue, Rehabilitation & Disaster Management	Brahm Shankar Jimpa	21 March 2022	23 September 2024
Revenue, Rehabilitation & Disaster Management	Hardeep Singh Mundian	23 September 2024	Incumbent
Rural Development and Panchayat	Kuldeep Singh Dhaliwal	21 March 2022	31 May 2023
Rural Development and Panchayat	Laljit Singh Bhullar	31 May 2023	23 September 2024
Rural Development and Panchayat	Tarunpreet Singh Sond	23 September 2024	Incumbent
School Education	Gurmeet Singh Meet Hayer	21 March 2022	5 July 2022
School Education	Harjot Singh Bains	5 July 2022	Incumbent
Science, Technology & Environment	Bhagwant Mann	16 March 2022	5 July 2022
Science, Technology & Environment	Gurmeet Singh Meet Hayer	5 July 2022	21 November 2023
Science, Technology & Environment	Bhagwant Mann	21 November 2023	Incumbent
Social Justice, Empowerment and Minorities	Baljit Kaur	21 March 2022	Incumbent
Social Security and Development of Women and Children	Baljit Kaur	21 March 2022	Incumbent
Sports and Youth Services	Gurmeet Singh Meet Hayer	21 March 2022	25 June 2024
Sports and Youth Services	Bhagwant Mann	25 June 2024	Incumbent
Technical Education and Industrial Training	Bhagwant Mann	16 March 2022	7 January 2023
Technical Education and Industrial Training	Harjot Singh Bains	7 January 2023	Incumbent
Tourism and Cultural Affairs	Harjot Singh Bains	21 March 2022	5 July 2022
Tourism and Cultural Affairs	Anmol Gagan Maan	5 July 2022	23 September 2024
Tourism and Cultural Affairs	Tarunpreet Singh Sond	23 September 2024	Incumbent
Transport	Laljit Singh Bhullar	21 March 2022	Incumbent
Vigilance	Bhagwant Mann	16 March 2022	Incumbent
Water Resources	Brahm Shankar Jimpa	21 March 2022	5 July 2022
Water Resources	Harjot Singh Bains	5 July 2022	7 January 2023
Water Resources	Gurmeet Singh Meet Hayer	7 January 2023	21 November 2023
Water Resources	Chetan Singh Jauramajra	21 November 2023	23 September 2024
Water Resources	Barinder Kumar Goyal	23 September 2024	Incumbent
Water Supply and Sanitation	Brahm Shankar Jimpa	21 March 2022	23 September 2024
Water Supply and Sanitation	Hardeep Singh Mundian	23 September 2024	Incumbent
Welfare of Freedom Fighters	Bhagwant Mann	16 March 2022	5 July 2022
Welfare of Freedom Fighters	Fauja Singh Sarari	5 July 2022	7 January 2023
Welfare of Freedom Fighters	Chetan Singh Jauramajra	7 January 2023	23 September 2024
Welfare of Freedom Fighters	Mohinder Bhagat	23 September 2024	Incumbent

== History ==
In April 1952, the Punjab State Legislature consisted was bicameral, divided into a Vidhan Sabha (lower house) and Vidhan Parishad (upper house). In 1956, the Vidhan Parishad was expanded from forty to forty-six seats, further being expanded to fifty-one seats in 1957. After Punjab underwent trifurcation in 1966, its Vidhan Parishad was reduced to forty seats while its Vidhan Sabha was increased to 104 seats. On 1 January 1970, the state's legislature became unicameral with the abolishment of the Vidhan Parishad. The present legislature consists of 117 members whom are elected from 117 single-seat constituencies. The term for every legislative assembly in Punjab is five years unless the legislature dissolved earlier.

== Legislative branch ==
The legislature comprises the governor and the Punjab Legislative Assembly, which is the highest political organ in the state. The governor has the power to summon the assembly or to close the same. All members of the legislative assembly are directly elected, normally once in every five years by the eligible voters who are above 18 years of age. The current assembly consists of 117 elected members. The elected members select one of its own members as its chairperson who is called the speaker of the assembly. The speaker is assisted by the deputy speaker who is also elected by the members. The conduct of a meeting in the house is the responsibility of the speaker.

The main function of the assembly is to pass laws and rules. Every bill passed by the house has to be finally approved by the governor before it becomes applicable.

The normal term of the legislative assembly is five years from the date appointed for its first meeting. In the Sixteenth Punjab Legislative Assembly, 94 members of the ruling Aam Aadmi Party form the treasury benches. The main opposition party in the assembly is Indian National Congress with 14 seats. The other parties which are in opposition are the Shiromani Akali Dal, the Bharatiya Janata Party, the Bahujan Samaj Party and independents. AAP MLA, Kultar Singh Sandhwan was announced as the speaker of the assembly.

Incumbent Chief Minister Bhagwant Mann took the oath of office on 16 March at Khatkar Kalan, the ancestral village of Bhagat Singh. Inderbir Singh Nijjar took the oath as pro tem Speaker. On 17 March Nijjar administered the oath of office to all the 117 legislators of the Sixteenth Punjab Legislative assembly. Other 10 cabinet ministers of the Mann ministry, took oath on 19 March.

On 22 June 2022, Speaker Kultar Singh Sandhwan announced that the legislators will get answers on all issues that they raise during the Assembly debates. The answers would be provided during the Zero Hour. This was done for the first time in the history of Punjab Assembly.

== Leaders ==
Title	Name	Portrait	Since
Constitutional Posts
Governor	Gulab Chand Kataria		30 July 2024
Speaker	Kultar Singh Sandhwan		21 March 2022
Deputy speaker	Jai Krishan Singh		30 June 2022
Leader of the House (Chief Minister)	Bhagwant Mann		16 March 2022
Leader of Opposition	Pratap Singh Bajwa		9 April 2022
Political posts
Leader of AAP legislature party	Bhagwant Mann		16 March 2022
Leader of INC legislature party	Pratap Singh Bajwa		9 April 2022
Leader of SAD legislature party	Ganieve Kaur Majithia		June 2026
Leader of AD (WPD) legislature party	Manpreet Singh Ayali		April 2022
Leader of BJP legislature party	Ashwani Kumar Sharma		April 2022
Leader of BSP legislature party	Nachhatar Pal		April 2022

== Judiciary ==
Punjab and Haryana High Court is the common High Court for the Indian states of Punjab and Haryana and the Union Territory of Chandigarh based in Chandigarh, India. Sanctioned strength of judges of this High Court is 85, consisting of 64 Permanent Judges, including the Chief Justice, and 21 Additional Judges. As of 21 August 2026, there are 64 Judges working in the High Court, comprising 41 Permanent and 23 Additional Judges.

The court building is known as the Palace of Justice. Designed by Le Corbusier, it and several of his other works were inscribed as UNESCO World Heritage Sites in July 2016.

== Departments and Agencies ==
- Departments of Government of Punjab, India
- Punjab Police

=== List of State Public Sector Undertakings ===
1. Punjab State Power Corporation Limited

== Divisional administration ==
Republic of India
States and Union Territories (e.g. Punjab State)
Division (e.g. Jalandhar division)
District (e.g. Gurdaspur district)
Sub-district (e.g. Dera Baba Nanak tehsil)
Sub-sub-district (e.g. sub-tehsil, community development block, etc.)
Local governing systems (e.g. revenue village, panchayat, municipal corporation), etc.

The state of Punjab has the following civil administrative set-up regarding subdivisional levels of governance:

1. Divisions (5) - headed by a Divisional Commissioner
2. Districts (23) - headed by a Deputy Commissioner or District Magistrate
3. Sub-district level
  - Sub-divisions (93) - headed by a Sub Divisional Magistrate
  - Tehsils (93) - headed by a Tehsildar
  - Sub-tehsils (87) - headed by a Naib Tehsildar
  - Development blocks (150) - headed by a block development and panchayat officer (BDPO), an executive officer of Block Samiti, and chairman of the blocksamiti
4. Settlements, comprising of villages (12,581), towns, and cities, managed by panchayats (Panchayat samiti and Gram panchayat), improvement trusts, municipal corporations, etc.

Districts are officially divided among five administrative divisions: Faridkot, Ferozepur, Jalandhar, Patiala, and Ropar. There are currently twenty-three districts in Punjab. Each district is under the administrative control of a Deputy Commissioner (DC), an IAS officer. The DC functions as the Collector for land revenue administration and as the District Magistrate (DM) for maintaining law and order in the district. The DC is assisted by Additional Deputy Commissioners (ADCs) at collectorate. The district magistrate or the deputy commissioner are also assisted by officers of the Punjab Civil Service and other state services. Policing for each district is the responsibility of a Senior Superintendent of Police who belongs to the Indian Police Service. Furthermore, each district has a division forest officer who is appointed from the Indian Forest Service to manage forests, wildlife, and the environment of the district, being assisted by officers belonging to the Punjab Forest Service and other environment-related officials. Also at the district level are district heads of the respective branch of the Public Works Department, Agriculture, Health, Education, and Animal Husbandry departments. These departments consist of officers who belong to various state services. The districts are subdivided into subdivisions and tehsils, headed by Sub-divisional magistrates (SDMs, selected from the State Civil Services/Punjab Civil Services) and Tehsildars (a revenue officer). As per Sunita Kaler, Punjab is a state in which there is little or no difference between tehsils and sub-divisions as they share the same boundaries as one another, unlike some other Indian states where these two terms refer to distinct administrative schemes. In India, the tehsil and talukas are important for land records and land revenue. The districts are subdivided into 93 tehsils, which have fiscal and administrative powers over settlements within their borders, including maintenance of local land records comes under the administrative control of a Tehsildar. Each Tehsil consists of blocks which are total 150 in number. Each block comprises of a block development and panchayat office (BDPO Office/BDO) and Block Samiti, headed by a block development and panchayat officer (BDPO) and executive officer of Block Samiti. Elected politically is a chairman of the blocksamiti. These blocks consist of Revenue Villages. There are total number of revenue villages in the state is 12,278.

There are 23 Zila Parishads, 136 Municipal Committees and 22 Improvement Trusts looking after 143 towns and 14 cities of Punjab. The local government institutions such as Panchayats looking after the governance of rural areas and municipalities looking after the governance of urban areas.

== See also ==
- Emblem of Punjab
- List of ministers in the Government of Punjab, India
- Punjab Remote Sensing Centre
- Punjab State Human Rights Commission
