= Divisions of Punjab, India =

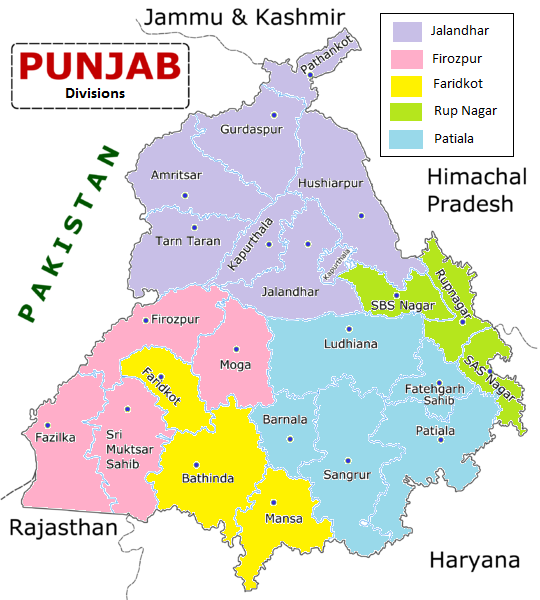
Administrative divisions of Punjab, 2016

Divisions are the second-level (below states) administrative-division for Punjab, India, consisting of a cluster of districts. Below the division level, the districts (23) are further subdivided by tehsil (82) and then sub-tehsil (87) or development blocks (147) in rural areas. Each division is headed by a Divisional Commissioner, with this person being an appointed officer of the Indian Administrative Services. Punjab comprises five divisions.

== Overview ==
Republic of India
States and Union Territories (e.g. Punjab State)
Division (e.g. Jalandhar division)
District (e.g. Gurdaspur district)
Sub-district (e.g. Dera Baba Nanak tehsil)
Sub-sub-district (e.g. sub-tehsil, community development block, etc.)
Local governing systems (e.g. revenue village, panchayat, municipal corporation, etc.)

== List of divisions ==
The state of Punjab, India is divided into five divisions which comprise the following districts:

Divisions of Punjab, India
No.	Name	Map	Districts comprised	Number of districts
1.	Jalandhar division		Jalandhar, Gurdaspur, Pathankot, Amritsar, Tarn Taran, Kapurthala, and Hoshiarpur	Seven
2.	Patiala division		Patiala, Sangrur, Barnala, Fatehgarh Sahib, Malerkotla, and Ludhiana	Six
3.	Firozpur division		Firozpur, Moga, Muktsar, and Fazilka	Four
4.	Faridkot division		Faridkot, Bathinda, and Mansa	Three
5.	Ropar division (Note: Also known as Rupnagar division.)		Ropar (Rupnagar), Ajitgarh (Mohali), and Shaheed Bhagat Singh Nagar (Nawan Shahr)	Three

== History ==
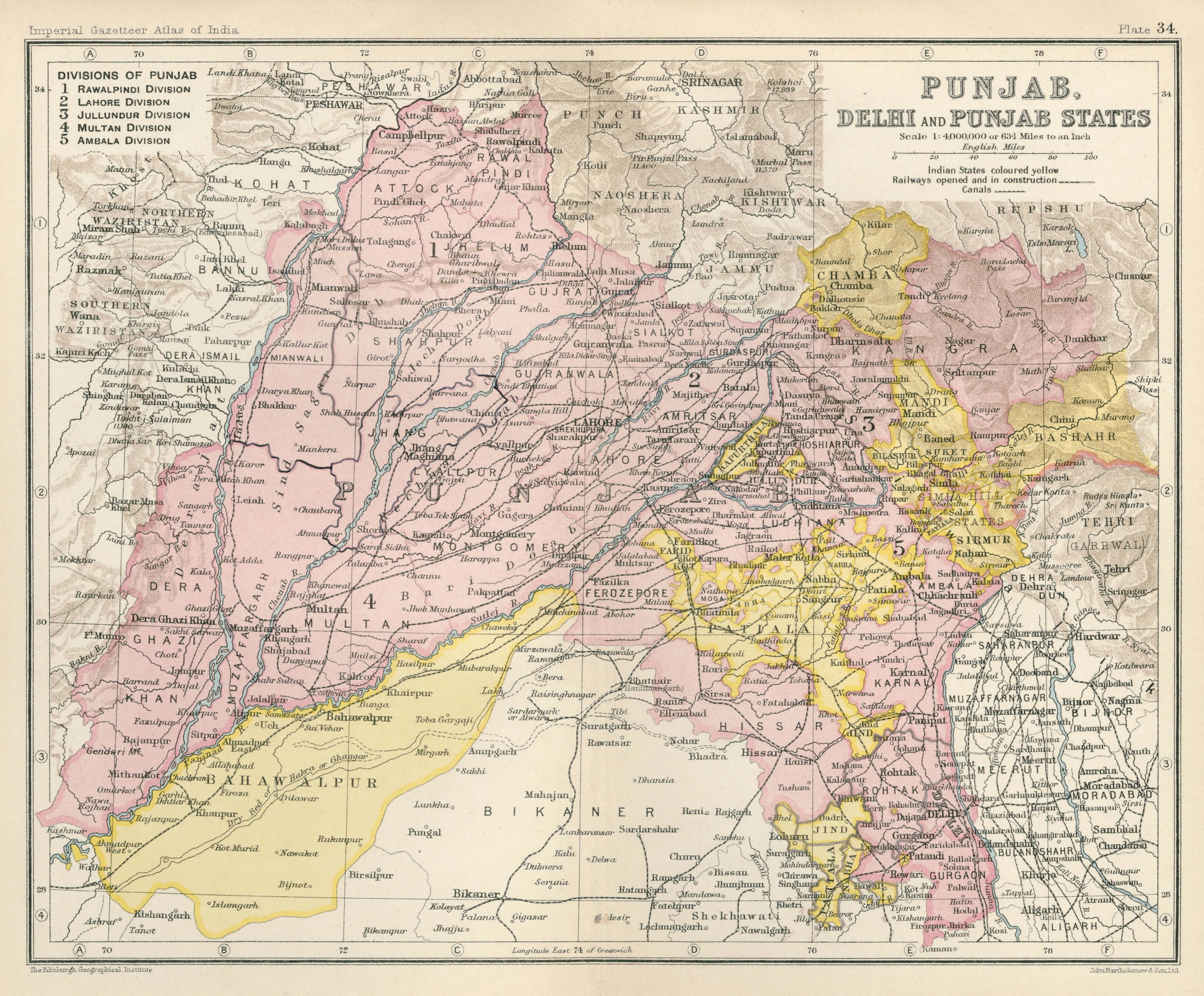
Map of Punjab, Delhi, and the Punjab States of British India, published in the 'Imperial Gazetteer of India' (Vol. XXVI, Atlas; 1931 revised edition; plate no. 34)

In 1916, British Punjab comprised five divisions under direct British-rule, namely the divisions of Ambala, Jalandhar, Lahore, Multan, and Rawalpindi, along with Delhi Enclave. Territory under the princely states was under the Punjab States Agency. In 1966, after the reorganisation of Punjab, there were only two divisions existing in the area constituting the modern state of Punjab, Jalandhar and Patiala. New divisions were formulated for better administration and for political purposes.

== See also ==
- List of districts of Punjab, India
- List of sub-districts of Punjab, India
