= Bal Kalan =

Bal Kalan is a village in Amritsar district, of Punjab state with total population of 728 households. The village divisions and sub-divisions are located in the city of Amritsar This village includes different castes mostly jats or jutts but the prominent ones are Baljutts and most of them migrated during the separation in 1947.
