= Chande, Punjab =

Village in Punjab, India

Chande ਚੰਦੇ
- Village
- Location of Chande within Punjab Chande (India)
- Coordinates: 31.763853°N 74.99560°E
- Country: India
- State: Punjab

Population (2011)
  - Total: 2,390
- Time zone: UTC+5:30 (India Standard Time)

Chande is a village located in Amritsar district in Punjab. As of 2011, it had a population of 2,390 people, with 1,245 men and 1,145 women.
