= E-governance in Punjab =

Digital governance in Indian state

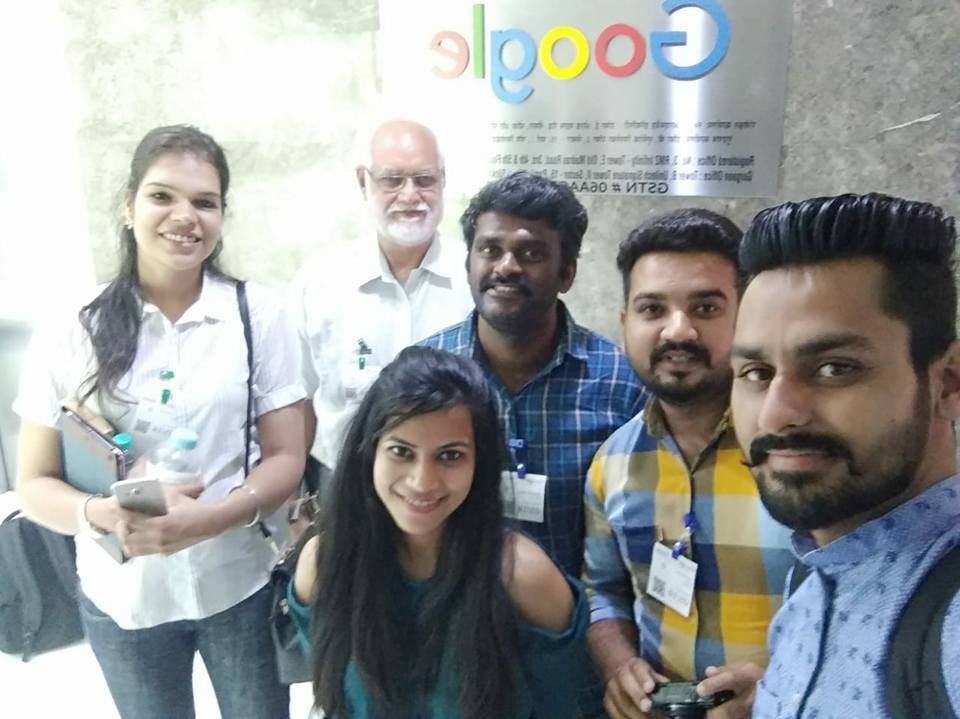
Google project in Punjab

E-governance in Punjab is implemented by Department of Governance Reforms and Public Grievances, Government of Punjab, India.

== Taxation ==
=== Background ===
The state Government of Punjab, India has embarked on reform program to modernise its tax administration. The key focus is on improving operational efficiency, enabling voluntary compliance and enhancing tax payer's convenience. The Department has already implemented the project on computerisation of VAT Information System (COVIS) which included designing of a statewide I.T. infrastructure with the central server at Patiala. All Excise and Taxation district offices are linked with the Central Server through leased-lines and V-Sat and formulation of centralised data base. The Department has engaged Ernst & Young as I.T. auditors and CORBUS as Application Software Developer for the Department. The Department has a separate agency known as Excise & Taxation Technical Services Agency (ETTSA) to look after the technical and other modernisation related issued of the department. Current auditor for ETTSA is PWC, but CORBUS is working for ETTSA from 2000 to till date as an application software developer.

=== Goals ===
There has been a strong demand for streamlining VAT administration through citizen-centric, service-oriented processes, and establishing a certain degree of standardisation with respect to Commercial Tax (CT) administration. Since the CT departments mainly interface with businesses and often account for 60−70 per cent of the total revenue of the States and Union Territories (UTs), their functioning can directly affect the attractiveness of a State or UT as a business destination. It is against this backdrop that the Commercial Taxes MMP was conceived. The initiative is spearheaded by the Department of Revenue (DoR), Ministry of Finance, with strategic consultancy provided by the National Institute for Smart Government (NISG) and Ernst & Young (E &Y).

Under this MMP, various recommendations have been made to facilitate simplification of administrative procedures and reduction of processing timelines. Some of the key recommendations are noted below:

- Electronic filing of returns
- Electronic clearance of refunds
- Electronic payment of tax
- Online dealer ledger
- Online issuance of CST statutory forms through Tax Information Exchange System (TINXSYS)
- Facility to dealer to obtain various online information services

=== Computerisation wing ===
ETTSA (Excise and Taxation Technical Services Agency) government of Punjab is an autonomous body working primarily towards computerisation and automation of the Excise and Taxation Department of the Punjab State Government. ETTSA works at 99 locations spanning the length and breadth of Punjab. These 99 locations house about 2500 users who are connected through a hybrid WAN network consisting of Leased Lines and VSATs. The central server is a UNIX RISC Central Server and there are 25 other Intel-based Application Servers. All the ETTSA users are on Thin Clients and to support them the organisation has got 15 Citrix Servers. There are 36 nodal Information Collection Centres (ICC) situated at the interstate borders which collect information on interstate trade. Information about any transaction made from the state of Punjab to other states and vice versa is collected online. When a Truck reaches the interstate border, the information about it is given to the ICC. Then ETTSA generates a statutory form — a Pass for the truck — to enter Punjab.

== Land records digitization ==
Punjab Remote Sensing Centre, Ludhiana is making land records of Punjab online available and helping in online registration of land registry.
