= Raj Lali Gill =

Indian politician

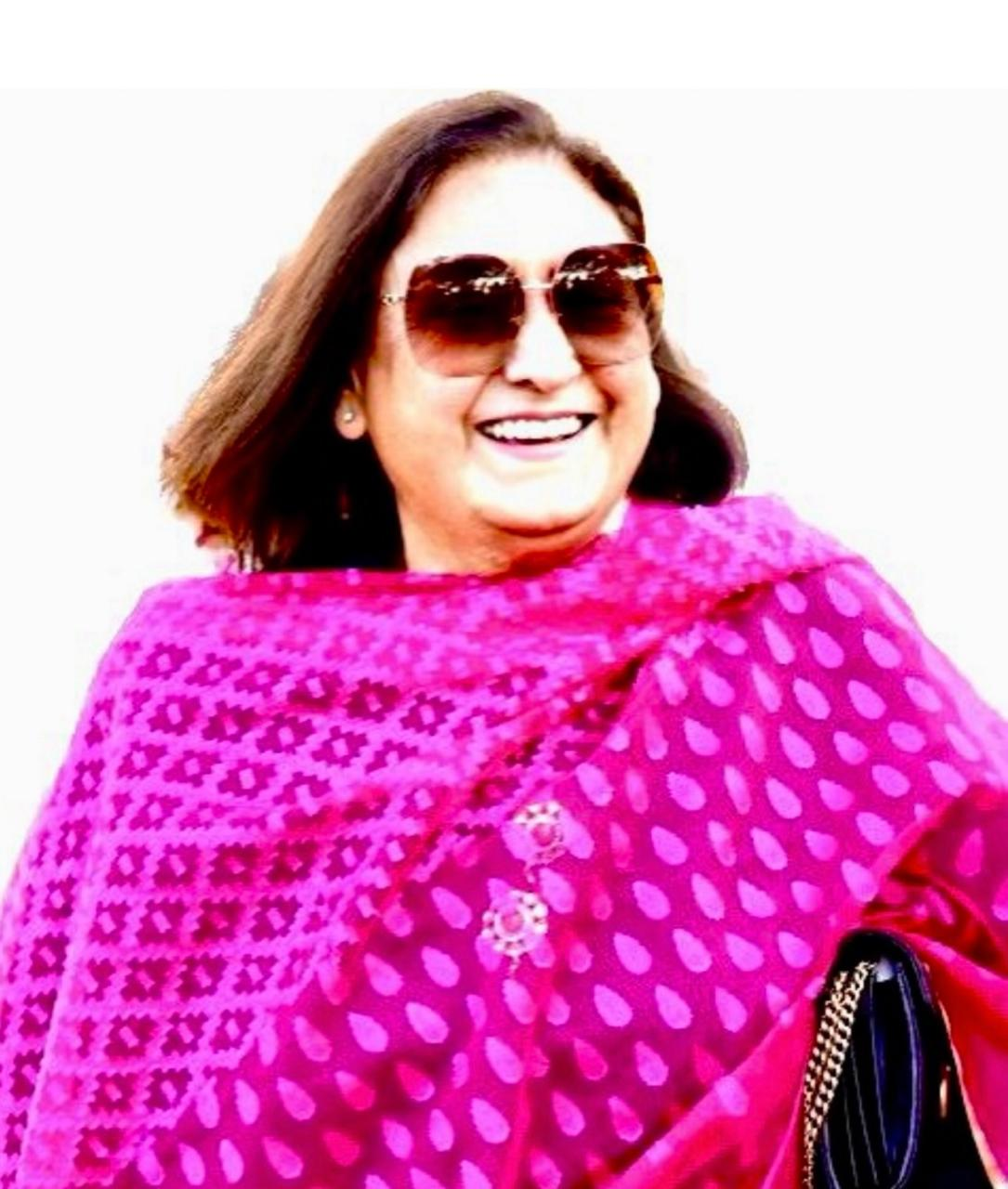

Chairperson of Punjab State Commission For Women
- Incumbent
- Assumed office 15 March 2024
- Preceded by: Smt. Manisha Gulati

President Punjab Women’s Wing
- In office 7 July 2018 – 2021
- Preceded by: Baljinder Kaur

Personal details
- Born: 17 September
- Party: Aam Aadmi Party
- Spouse: Lalinderjit Singh Gill
- Children: 1
- Occupation: Politician, Venture Capitalist

Raj Lali Gill is an Indian politician and Venture Capitalist. She is the serving Chairperson of the Punjab State Commission For Women (PSCW) and a member of the Aam Aadmi Party.

== Political career ==
Raj Lali Gill joined the Aam Aadmi Party in 2014 after being inspired by the work of Anna Hazare and Arvind Kejriwal. As the head of Aam Aadmi Party’s women wing, she has worked on issues affecting women in the state of Punjab and has been a strong advocate of women's rights.

On 7 July 2018, Gill became the President of the Punjab Women’s Wing.

On 15 March 2024, Raj Lali Gill was appointed as the Chairperson of the Punjab State Commission For Women, a statutory quasi-institutional body of the Government of Punjab which is generally concerned with advising the government on all policy matters affecting women and to advance the status of women in Punjab as well as enquire into unfair practices affecting women. In her present role, Gill has quasi-judicial powers to protect women rights and crimes against them.

=== Statutory Standing ===
The Chairperson is part of a Commission that also includes non-official members, plus ex-officio senior officials (including the Director General of Police, Punjab) and a Member-Secretary (a senior civil service officer). The Chairperson are deemed public servants for legal purposes.

== Work ==
During her tenure as chairperson, the commission has implemented several programs aimed at promoting women's rights and welfare. Gill has taken multiple initiatives to address the difficulties faced by women, particularly those in distress. Through her statements, she has emphasized the importance of providing assistance to women, who face legal, medical, and educational challenges as well as women who are incarcerated.

Gill has worked closely with various stakeholders—including government officials, NGOs, and community leaders—to strengthen coordination between the government and organisations focused on women’s welfare. She is committed to ensuring the effective implementation of policies aimed at women’s safety and empowerment.

Gill launched a campaign 'Sanjh Rahat Project' for supporting women who face domestic violence. Two women police officials have been assigned to provide support and counselling to domestic violence victims.

She arranged legal, emotional and rehabilitative assistance to the victims of sexual violence in April 2025.

Gill also took strict action on a Live-in relationship in June 2025. In August 2025, she had summoned two singers, Yo Yo Honey Singh and Karan Aujla, for vulgar lyrics in their latest songs.

== Personal life ==
Before she went back to India, Raj Lali Gill lived in Washington, DC, for many years and grew up there. She is married to Lalinderjit Singh Gill and has a daughter named Gurpreet (Blu) Gill Maag. Gurpreet is a famous venture capitalist and former model and now lives in Singapore.
