= Hoshiar Nagar =

Village in Punjab, India

Coordinates: 31°35′01″N 74°40′49″E

Hoshiar Nagar is situated in Amritsar I tehsil in Amritsar district, in the Indian state of Punjab. It is 22 km from district headquarter Amritsar. The total population of this village is 1,820 out which male population is 921 and female population is 899.

Pin code of this village is 143107.
