= Tehsils of Punjab =

Tehsils of Punjab may refer to:

- List of tehsils of Punjab, Pakistan
- List of sub-districts of Punjab, India
