= List of districts of Punjab =

List of districts of Punjab may refer to:

- List of districts of Punjab, India
- List of districts of Punjab, Pakistan
