= Kaler, Amritsar =

Kaler is a village in Amritsar district, Punjab, India. In the 2011 census its population was measured at 3577.
