= Padri, Punjab =

Village in Punjab, India

Coordinates: 31°38′04″N 74°39′59″E

Padri village is located in Amritsar tehsil in Amritsar district in Punjab, India. The village is 25 kilometers from the district headquarters in Amritsar. Padri village is also a Gram Panchayat.

Its population is 2,779 of which 1,440 are males and 1,339 are females. Its pin code is 143107.
