= Punjab State Commission For Women =

Statutory body for women's rights, India

Punjab State Commission for Women
Commission overview
- Formed: 15 October 2004
- Jurisdiction: Government of Punjab
- Headquarters: Punjab State Commission for Women, SCO No. -57, 58, 59 Sector-17-C (Top floor in front of Neelam Cinema) Chandigarh.
- Commission executive: Raj Lali Gill, Chairperson
- Website: Official Website Official website

Punjab State Commission for Women is a statutory body constituted in the year 1993 to deal with the issues relating to crime against women in the state of Punjab. The commission for the welfare of women in the state was set up by Punjab Government as a quasi-judicial body.

== History and objectives ==
Punjab State Commission for Women was formed to investigate specific problems relating to women and apart from studying women-related issues in the state. The Commission is equipped with powers to safeguard rights of women and ensure their protection and equality against any form of harassment and issues faced in the family and community.

The commission was created with the following objectives:

- Ensuring the protection and welfare of women.
- Handle gender-based issues through timely intervention in case of any violation of relevant laws or opportunity denial or depriving the women of any rights.
- Recommending to the state government on women-based issues.
- The commission occasionally takes steps to create public awareness regarding the state's women-based legislation.

Chairperson of Punjab State Commission for Women, Manisha Gulati, made her number 88659-00064 public to facilitate distressed women to lodge immediate complaints.

== Composition ==
Punjab State Commission for Women was formed with a chairperson and other members. The social welfare department of the state makes modalities for appointing the Chairman of the State Commission for Women. Their salary and other emoluments are fixed by the state government and revised from time to time.

Smt. Raj Lali Gill is the Chairperson of the Punjab State Commission for Women.

== Activities ==
Punjab State Commission for Women was formed in 2006 to perform below activities:

- Commission should ensure that it adheres to the provision and protection guaranteed for women under the Constitution of India and women-related legislations.
- In case any agency in the state fails to implement protective measures against women, getting the same to the notice of the Government.
- Making recommendations for the amendments in any law if it fails on the provision of justice to the women of the state.
- Taking up with concerned authorities any issue of violation of women's rights and recommending follow-up action to them.
- Women who have complaints of violation of their rights and non-implementation of their protective measures guaranteed under the Constitution of India can directly approach Women Commission for redressal.
- Counselling and assisting women who are victims of atrocities and discrimination in the state.
- Financing litigation expenses for any issues involving mass groups of women and occasionally making reports to the state government relating to them.
- Inspecting any premises, jail or other remand homes where women prisoners are lodged or any other case and bringing them to the notice of respective authorities, in case of need.
- Enquire, study and investigate any specific women-based issues.
- Initiate educational research or undertake any promotional method and recommend ways for ensuring women's representation in all areas and identifying reasons for depriving them of their rights.
- To enquire suo-moto or any complaints of any issue which deprives women of their rights or women protection laws not being implemented or noncompliance of any policies relating to them or failure of following instructions relating to women welfare and relief associated with them.

== See also ==
- National Commission for Women
