= List of districts of Punjab, India =

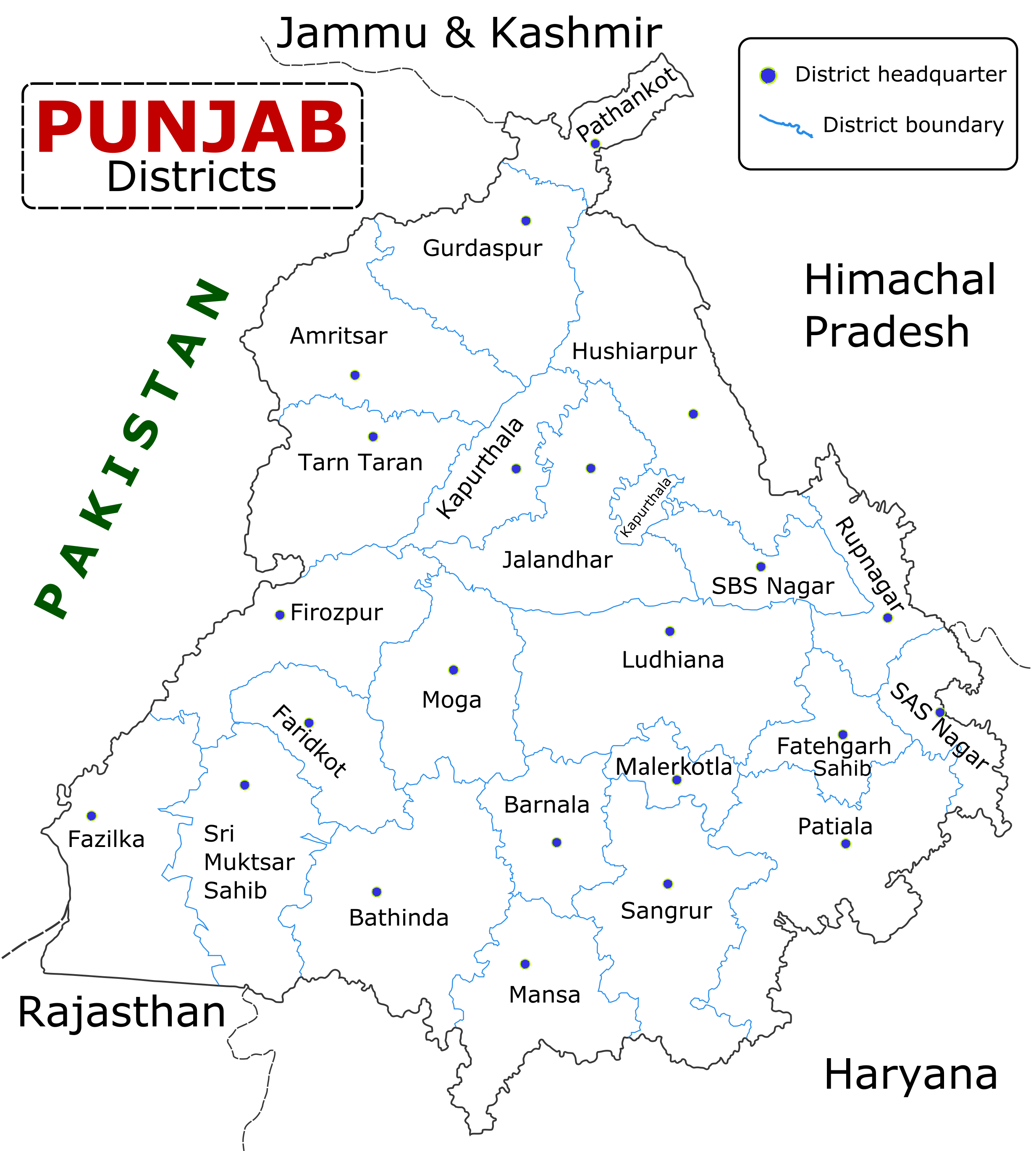
23 districts of Punjab along with their headquarters as of 2023.

A district of the Punjab state of India is the third-level administrative geographical unit, headed by a District Magistrate or Deputy Commissioner, an officer belonging to the Indian Administrative Service. The District Magistrate or the Deputy Commissioner is assisted by a number of officers belonging to Punjab Civil Service and other state services. There are 23 Districts in Punjab, after Malerkotla district bifurcated from Sangrur district as the 23rd district on 14 May 2021.

== Overview ==
Republic of India
States and Union Territories (e.g. Punjab State)
Division (e.g. Jalandhar division)
District (e.g. Gurdaspur district)
Sub-district (e.g. Dera Baba Nanak tehsil)
Sub-sub-district (e.g. sub-tehsil, community development block, etc.)
Local governing systems (e.g. revenue village, panchayat, municipal corporation, etc.)

Districts are officially divided among 5 administrative divisions: Faridkot, Ferozepur, Jalandhar, Patiala, and Ropar. Senior Superintendent of Police, an officer of the Indian Police Service is entrusted with the responsibility of maintaining law and order and related issues in the districts of the state. They are assisted by the officers of the Punjab Police and other services. Division Forest Officer, an officer belonging to the Indian Forest Service is responsible for managing the forests, environment and wildlife related issues of the districts. They are assisted by the officers of the Department of Forest and Wildlife. Sectoral development is looked after by the district head of each development sector such as Irrigation, PwD (Public works department), Agriculture, Health, Education, Animal husbandry, etc. These offices belong to various state services.

== History ==
After the independence of India in 1947 that partitioned British Punjab into two halves, Indian Punjab (which consisted of present-day Punjab, Haryana, and Himachal Pradesh) consisted of thirteen districts that had been under direct British-rule: Ambala, Hisar, Rohtak, Gurgaon, Karnal, Jullundur (now Jalandhar), Hoshiarpur, Ludhiana, Ferozepur, Amritsar, Gurdaspur, Simla (now Shimla), and Kangra. Regarding territory of the princely-states, the Patiala and East Punjab States Union (PEPSU) was formed in 15 July 1948 out of the former princely-states of Patiala, Nabha, Jind, Kapurthala, Faridkot, Malerkotla, Kalsia, and Nalagarh. Yadvinder Singh of Patiala served as the Rajpramukh of PEPSU but the short-lived entity was absorbed into Punjab in 1 November 1956 under the States Reorganisation Act, 1956.

Before the 1966 split, Punjab consisted of 18 district, with 7 districts being predominantly Hindi-speaking, parts of Ambala, Sangrur, Karnal, Gurgaon, Rohtak, Hisar, and Mahendragarh districts. The Punjab Reorganisation Act, 1966 trifucated the Punjab state based upon linguistic and geographical divides, where Hindi-speaking areas were separated to form Haryana and mountaine areas in the Pahari region were separated to form Himachal Pradesh. This left Punjab with eleven districts: Amritsar, Gurdaspur (some areas transferred to Himachal Pradesh), Ferozepur, Jalandhar, Hoshiarpur (some areas transferred to Himachal Pradesh, specifically Una tehsil), Ludhiana, Bathinda, Kapurthala, Sangrur (some areas transferred to Haryana), Patiala, and Ropar (carved out of the former Ambala district). Chandigarh became the joint capital of Punjab and Haryana as a Union Territory (UT). The seven mostly Hindi-speaking districts and hill districts were transferred to Haryana and Himachal Pradesh, respectively.

In 1972, Faridkot district was formed as the 12th district by carving out areas from Bathinda and Ferozepur districts. Mansa became the 13th district when it was carved-out of Bathinda district in 1992. Also in 1992, Fatehgarh Sahib district was created by carving-out areas of Patiala and Ropar districts. Muktsar Sahib district was created by carving out areas of Faridkot district. Nawanshahr district was created by carving-out areas of Hoshiarpur district (such as Balachaur tehsil). Moga became the 17th district by carving-out areas from Faridkot and Ferozpur districts. Mohali district formed in 2006. Tarn Taran district was formed out of Amritsar district to coincide with the 400th anniversary of Guru Arjan. In 2011, three new districts were formed, Pathankot district from Gurdaspur district, Barnala district from Sangrur district, and Fazilka district from Ferozepur district, leaving the total number of districts as twenty-two. In 2021, Malerkotla district was formed out of Sangrur district. Despite its formation, adequate infrastructure befitting of a district is yet to be provided fully to Malerkotla district. As of today, there are presently 23 districts in Punjab, India.

In late 2025, an Anandpur Sahib district was proposed to be formed out of Ropar district and Hoshiarpur district.

== Nomenclature ==
The names of nearly all the districts of Punjab are eponymous with their district headquarters. Some district have been renamed to commemorate historical figures, such as Nawanshahr district being renamed to Shaheed Bhagat Singh Nagar (in 2008) and Mohali district being renamed to Sahibzada Ajit Singh Nagar.

== List ==
S. No.	Code	District	Headquarters	Population (2011)	Area (km^{2})	Density (/km^{2})	Highlighted Map
1	AM	Amritsar	Amritsar	2,490,891	2,647	932	
2	BNL	Barnala	Barnala	596,294	1,410	419	
3	BA	Bathinda	Bathinda	1,388,859	3,385	414	
4	FR	Faridkot	Faridkot	618,008	1,469	424	
5	FT	Fatehgarh Sahib	Fatehgarh Sahib	599,814	1,180	508	
6	FI	Firozpur	Firozpur	965,337	2,190	440	
7	FA	Fazilka	Fazilka	1,180,483	3,113	379	
8	GU	Gurdaspur	Gurdaspur	2,299,026	2,635	872	
9	HO	Hoshiarpur	Hoshiarpur	1,582,793	3,365	466	
10	JA	Jalandhar	Jalandhar	2,181,753	2,632	831	
11	KA	Kapurthala	Kapurthala	817,668	1,632	501	
12	LU	Ludhiana	Ludhiana	3,487,882	3,767	975	
13	ML	Malerkotla	Malerkotla	452,016	837	540	
14	MA	Mansa	Mansa	768,808	2,171	350	
15	MO	Moga	Moga	992,289	2,216	444	
16	MU	Sri Muktsar Sahib	Sri Muktsar Sahib	902,702	2,615	348	
17	PA	Pathankot	Pathankot	676,598	929	728	
18	PA	Patiala	Patiala	1,892,282	3,218	596	
19	RU	Rupnagar	Rupnagar	683,349	1,369	488	
20	SAS	Sahibzada Ajit Singh Nagar	Mohali	986,147	1,093	830	
21	SA	Sangrur	Sangrur	1,203,153	2,848	422	
22	NS	Shaheed Bhagat Singh Nagar	Nawanshahr	614,362	1,267	478	
23	TT	Tarn Taran	Tarn Taran Sahib	1,120,070	2,449	464	

== Proposals for new districts ==
Demands for new districts
From time to time, several ministers and elected representatives, such as MLAs and MPs, have proposed the following new districts:

Proposed District	Proposed Headquarters	Current District
Anandpur Sahib district	Nangal	Ropar district
Ajnala district	Ajnala	Amritsar district
Batala district	Batala	Gurdaspur district
Jagraon district	Jagraon	Ludhiana district
Samrala district	Samrala	Ludhiana district
Malerkotla district(extended)	Malerkotla	Malerkotla district and parts of Sangrur district
Phagwara district	Phagwara	Kapurthala district
Nakodar district	Nakodar	Jalandhar district
Phillaur district	Phillaur	Jalandhar district
Dasuya district	Dasuya	Hoshiarpur district
Garhshankar district	Garhshankar	Hoshiarpur district
Patti district	Patti	Tarn Taran district
Zira district	Zira	Ferozepur district & Moga district
Rajpura district	Rajpura	Patiala district
Nabha district	Nabha	Patiala district

== See also ==
- Divisions of Punjab, India
- List of sub-districts of Punjab, India
