= Punjab Remote Sensing Centre =

Government agency

- Founder: Government of Punjab
- Established: 1987
- Mission: Remote sensing, GIS, satellite navigation
- Chair: Brijendra Pateriya
- Location: Punjab Agricultural University campus, Ludhiana, Punjab, India
- Website: prsc.gov.in

Punjab Remote Sensing Centre (PRSC) is an autonomous organization under the Department of Agriculture, Government of Punjab state in India. PRSC has MoUs with Panjab University, Chandigarh, Guru Nanak Dev Engineering College, Ludhiana and Lovely Professional University.

== Projects ==
- e-Pehal, an android Mobile app for monitoring tree plantation.
- i-Khet Machine, e-PeHaL and e-Prevent apps for informers to make the government aware regarding stubble burning incidents around them.
- Online property information by geospatial technology in revenue and property mapping.

== See also ==
- E-governance in Punjab
