= Anandpur Sahib district =

Proposed district in Punjab, India

Anandpur Sahib district is a proposed district for Punjab, India, to unite the Anandpur Sahib region currently split between Ropar and Hoshiarpur districts under one administrative district. The proposed district will be carved-out from the existing Ropar district with Anandpur Sahib and Nangal as its headquarters. The idea arose in late 2025 co-inciding with the 350th martyrdom day of Guru Tegh Bahadur. It the proposal is successful, the district will become the 24th district of Punjab and its newest, after the formation of Malerkotla district in 2021. To help form the district, Garhshankar tehsil from Hoshiarpur district may be added to it, which drew protests there. The proposal was criticized in the existing Ropar district for being politically motivated and that it would cost Rs 500–560 crore to create the new district. The proposal was also criticized as Malerkotla was formed as a district in 2021 yet still has not been provided the infrastructure it needs to function as a district. The proposal was opposed by the Congress. The current status of the proposal is uncertain as its expected announcement on 24 November 2025 did not occur. An alternative proposal is to rename the existing Ropar (Rupnagar) district as Anandpur Sahib district.
