= Patiala division =

Administrative division of Punjab, India

- Division
- Location of Patiala division in Punjab
- Country: India
- State: Punjab

Patiala division is one of the five administrative divisions of Punjab, India. It consists of six districts, namely Patiala, Sangrur, Barnala, Fatehgarh Sahib, Malerkotla, and Ludhiana. The current Divisional Commissioner is Vinay Bublani. The head office of the division is located at District Administrative complex, Block A Mini sectt, Patiala, Punjab.
