= Harpinder Singh Chawla =

Indian dental surgeon and researcher

- Born: 15 March 1950 (age 76); Amritsar, Punjab, India
- Occupation: Dental surgeon
- Known for: Pediatric dentistry
- Spouse: Kiran Chaudhary
- Children: One son and a daughter
- Parent(s): Sukhdev Singh Chawla; Iqbal Kaur Chawla
- Awards: Padma Shri Punjab Ratan
- Website: Persona blog

Harpinder Singh Chawla is an Indian dental surgeon, medical researcher and writer, known for his work in pediatric dentistry. Born on 15 March 1945 to Sukhdev Singh and Iqbal Kaur Chawla in Amritsar, the temple town in the Indian state of Punjab, he graduated in Dentistry from the Government Dental College and Hospital, Amritsar in 1967. He did his post graduation in the speciality of pedodontics and preventive dentistry from the same college in 1970. He is the incumbent Head of the Oral Health Science Center of PGIMER.

Chawla is known to have been involved in medical research and has published his research findings as several articles in peer reviewed journals. He is a former president of the Asian Academy of Preventive Dentistry and a member and elected Fellow of the National Academy of Medical Sciences (NAMS) as well as the Indian Society Pedodontics and Preventive Dentistry. The Government of India awarded him the fourth highest civilian honour of the Padma Shri, in 2007, for his contributions to Indian medicine. He was also bestowed with the Punjab Ratan in 2006.
