= Faridkot division =

Administrative division of Punjab, India

Faridkot Division
- Division of Punjab
- Location of Faridkot division in Punjab
- Country: India
- State: Punjab
- Established: 1995
- Headquarters: Faridkot
- Districts: Faridkot, Bathinda, Mansa

Government
  - Divisional Commissioner: Manjit Singh Brar (IAS)

Area
  - Total: 7,017 km^{2} (2,709 sq mi)

Population (2011) (Note: Population data obtained from the sum of the populations of the districts.)
  - Total: 2,775,784

Faridkot division is one of the five administrative divisions of Punjab, India. It consists of three districts, namely Faridkot, Bathinda, and Mansa. The current Divisional Commissioner is Manjit Singh Brar. The head office of the division is located at Office of Commissioner Faridkot Division, Faridkot, Circuit House, Faridkot 151203- Punjab.
