= Firozpur division =

Administrative division of Punjab, India

- Division
- Location of Firozpur division in Punjab
- Country: India
- State: Punjab

Firozpur division is one of the five administrative divisions of Punjab, India. It consists of four districts, namely Firozpur, Moga, Muktsar, and Fazilka. (Note: There are various archaic and modern spellings of the division, such as Ferozepore, Ferozepur, Ferozpore, Ferozepur, Ferozpur, Firozpore, Firozpur, and others. The official spelling presently used by the government of the state of Punjab (India) is 'Firozpur'.) The current Divisional Commissioner is Daljit Singh Mangat. The head office of the division is located at Office of Divisional Commissioner Ferozepur, Ferozepur Cantt, Punjab.
