= Ropar division =

Administrative division of Punjab, India

- Division
- Location of Ropar division in Punjab
- Country: India
- State: Punjab

Ropar division, also known as Rupnagar division, is one of the five administrative divisions of Punjab, India. It consists of three districts, namely Ropar (Rupnagar), Ajitgarh (Mohali), and Shaheed Bhagat Singh Nagar (Nawan Shahr). The current Divisional Commissioner is Manvesh Singh Sidhu. The head office of the division is located at Commissioner Rupnagar Division Mini Secretariat Rupnagar 140001, Punjab.
