= Jalandhar division =

Administrative division of Punjab, India

- Division
- Location of Jalandhar division in Punjab
- Country: India
- State: Punjab

Jalandhar division is one of the five administrative divisions of Punjab, India. It consists of seven districts, namely Jalandhar, Gurdaspur, Pathankot, Amritsar, Tarn Taran, Kapurthala, and Hoshiarpur. The current Divisional Commissioner is Sh. Ramvir, IAS. The head office of the division is located at Office of Commissioner Jalandhar Division, Jalandhar, New Court Road, Adjoining NRI Sabha Punjab, Jalandhar 144001- Punjab.
