= Dera Baba Nanak tehsil =

Tehsil of Majha region in Punjab, India

Dera Baba Nanak is a sub-district (tehsil) in Gurdaspur district in Punjab, India. Its headquarters is in Dera Baba Nanak city. It is situated in the western part of the district, along the Indo-Pakistani border. It was created in 1995. The Kartarpur corridor is situated there, that connects Gurdwara Kartarpur Sahib on the other side of the international border.

== History ==
During the 1971 Indo-Pakistan war, some military action was seen in the area around Kasowal, near Dera Baba Nanak city. This battle was won by Indian army. In this battle, 32 soldiers were killed and 3 wounded on the Indian side. On the Pakistani side, 34 soldiers were killed, 1 wounded and 26 were missing or captured. Three soldiers who participated in this battle were awarded Maha Vir Chakras (MVCs).

== Demographics ==
According to the 2011 census, Dera Baba Nanak sub-district has a total population of 124,295. Of these, 65,662 were males and 58,633 were females. The population of children below the age of 6 was 15,064, of which 8,338 were males and 6,716 were females. The population of Scheduled castes was 16,761, of which 8,775 were males and 7,986 were females. The number of persons who were literate were 80,449, of which 45,133 were males and 35,316 were females.

=== Religion ===
The table below shows the population by religion of Dera Baba Nanak sub-district and their gender ratio, as of 2011 census.

Population by religion of Dera Baba Nanak sub-district, census 2011
Religion	Total	Male	Female	Gender ratio
Sikh	85,046	44,647	40,399	904
Christian	22,846	11,961	10,885	910
Hindu	15,159	8,371	6,788	810
Muslim	433	257	176	684
Jain	32	13	19	1461
Buddhist	26	18	8	444
Other religions	28	16	12	750
Not stated	725	379	346	912
Total	1,24,295	65,662	58,633	892

The table below shows the absolute number of religious communities by urban and rural areas.

Religious groups by urban and rural areas, 2011 census
Religion	Urban	Rural
Sikh	4,829	80,217
Hindu	4,531	10,628
Christian	911	21,935
Muslim	74	359
Buddhist	6	20
Jain	0	32
Other religions	3	25
Not stated	41	684
Total	10,395	113,900

== Notable places ==
- Gurudwara Chola Sahib, Dera Baba Nanak
- Kartarpur corridor
- Shri Bawa Lal Dayal temple, Dhianpur

== Notable people ==
- Guru Randhawa, a Punjabi singer, songwriter and composer
- Sujan Singh, a Punjabi story writer
