= Community development block =

Rural area earmarked for administration and development in India

Administrative structure of India

In India, a community development block (CD block) or simply a block is a sub-division of a district, administratively earmarked for planning and development. In tribal areas, similar sub-divisions are called tribal development blocks (TD blocks). The area is administered by a block development officer (BDO), supported by several technical specialists and village-level workers. A community development block covers several gram panchayats, the local administrative units at the village level. A block is a rural subdivision and typically smaller than a tehsil. A tehsil is purely for revenue administration, whereas a block is for rural development purposes. In most states, a block is coterminous with the panchayat samiti area.

== Nomenclature ==
The nomenclature varies from state to state, such as common terms like "block" and others including community development block, panchayat union block, panchayat block, panchayat samiti block, development block, etc. All denote a CD Block, which is a subdivision of a district, exclusively for rural development.

== History ==
The concept of the community development block was first suggested by Grow More Food (GMF) Enquiry Committee in 1952 to address the challenge of multiple rural development agencies working without a sense of common objectives. Based on the committee's recommendations, the community development programme was launched on a pilot basis in 1952 to provide for a substantial increase in the country's agricultural programme, and for improvements in systems of communication, in rural health and hygiene, and in rural education and also to initiate and direct a process of integrated culture change aimed at transforming the social and economic life of villagers. The community development programme was rapidly implemented. In 1956, by the end of the first five-year plan period, there were 248 blocks, covering around a fifth of the population in the country. By the end the second five-year plan period, there were 3,000 blocks covering 70 per cent of the rural population. By 1964, the entire country was covered.

== Block Development Officer ==
A Block Development Officer (BDO) is an administrative officer in India responsible for the overall development of a Community Development Block (CD Block), a sub-division of a district. They are appointed by the state government and report to the Chief Development Officer (CDO) or District Development Commissioner or the similar position.

They typically fall under the purview of the Rural Development Department or Department of Panchayats of the respective state government. The BDO is responsible for overall supervision of all the antipoverty schemes and execution of the Developmental works.

The BDO functions as the Secretary of the Panchayat Samiti/Block Panchayat and exercises supervision and control over the extension officers and other employees of the Panchayat Samiti and the staff borne on transferred schemes.

== Blocks statewise ==
The following table lists the number of Development Blocks across the States and Union Territories of India. The administrative data is as of 1 February 2024:

State/ Union territory	No. of Blocks
Andaman and Nicobar Islands	9
Andhra Pradesh	668
Arunachal Pradesh	129
Assam	230
Bihar	534
Chandigarh	1
Chhattisgarh	145
Delhi	0
Goa	12
Gujarat	250
Haryana	143
Himachal Pradesh	88
Jammu and Kashmir	287
Jharkhand	264
Karnataka	235
Kerala	152
Ladakh	31
Lakshadweep	10
Madhya Pradesh	313
Maharashtra	352
Manipur	70
Meghalaya	54
Mizoram	28
Nagaland	74
Odisha	314
Puducherry	6
Punjab	153
Rajasthan	362
Sikkim	33
Tamil Nadu	388
Telangana	594
Dadra and Nagar Haveli and Daman and Diu	3
Tripura	58
Uttar Pradesh	826
Uttarakhand	95
West Bengal	345
Total	7256
