= Amritsar district =

District in Punjab, India

- District
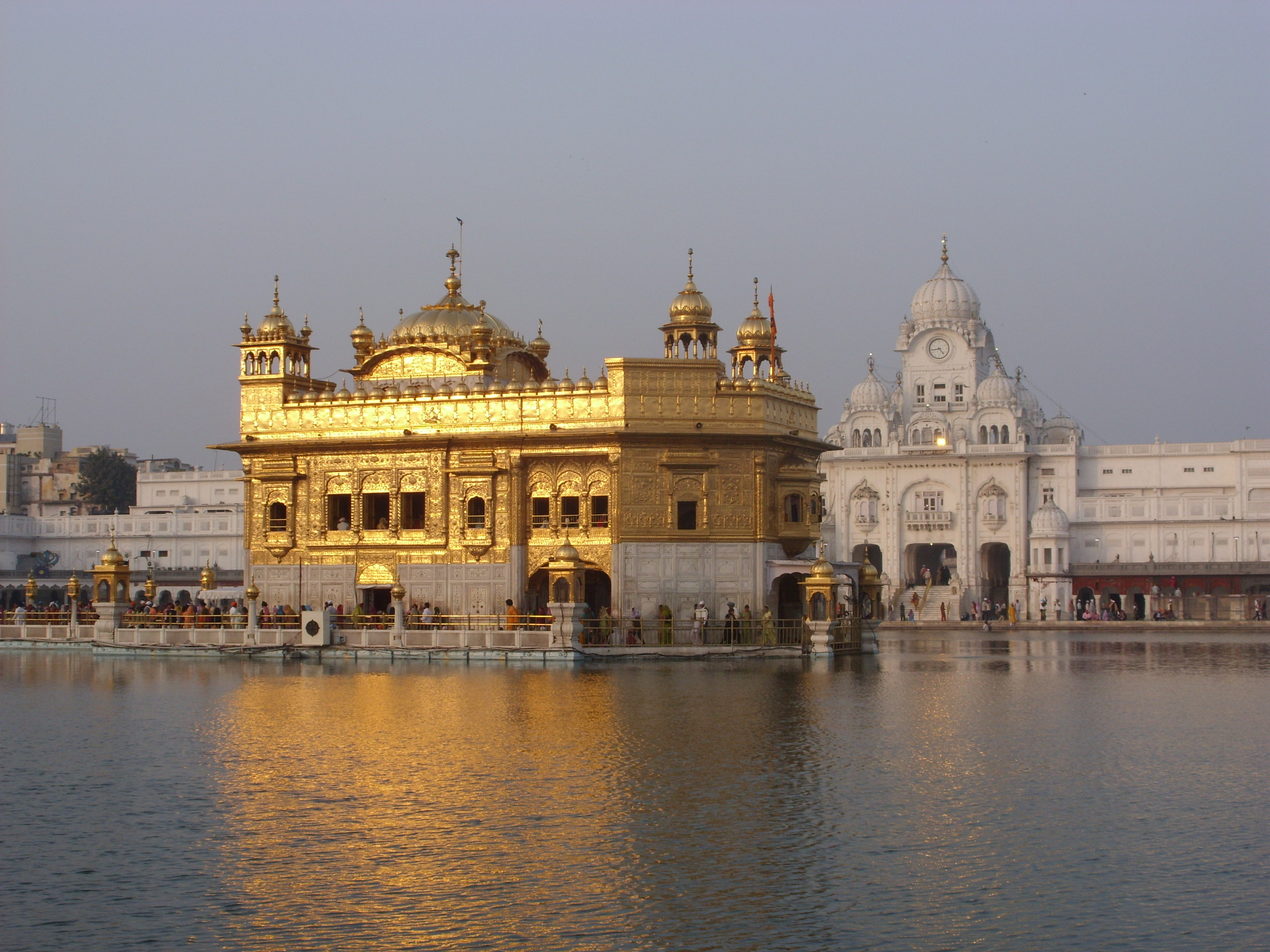
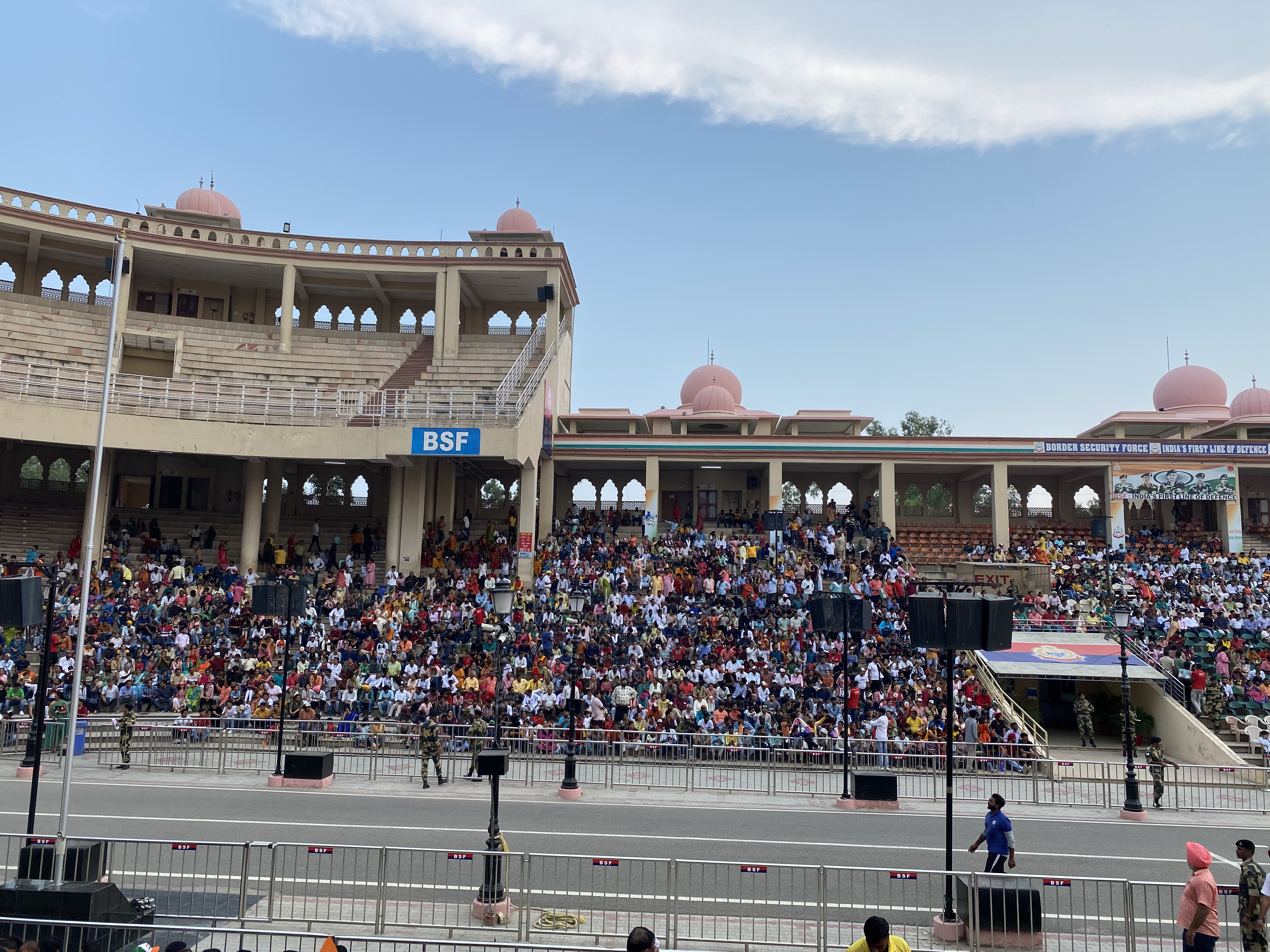
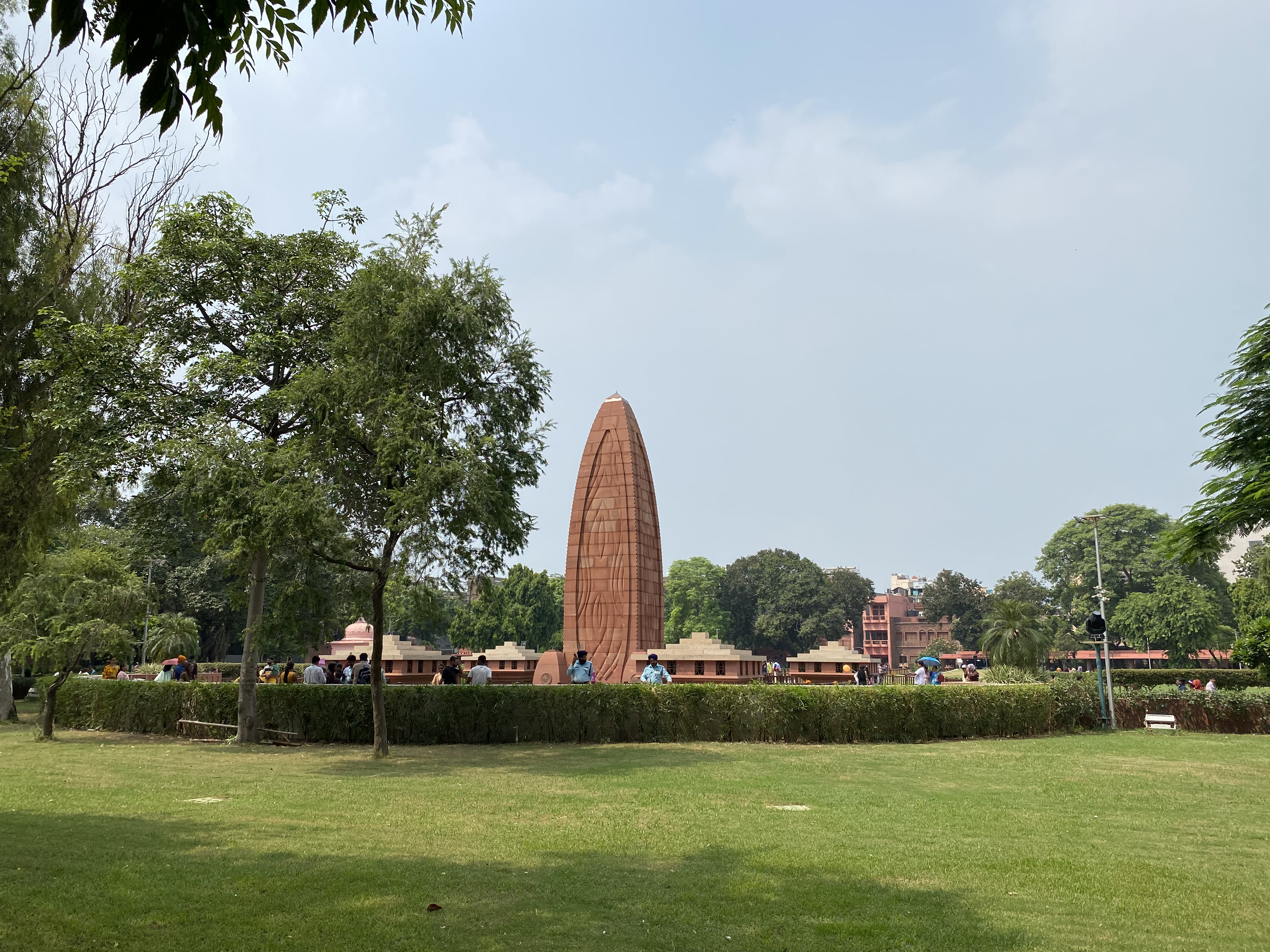
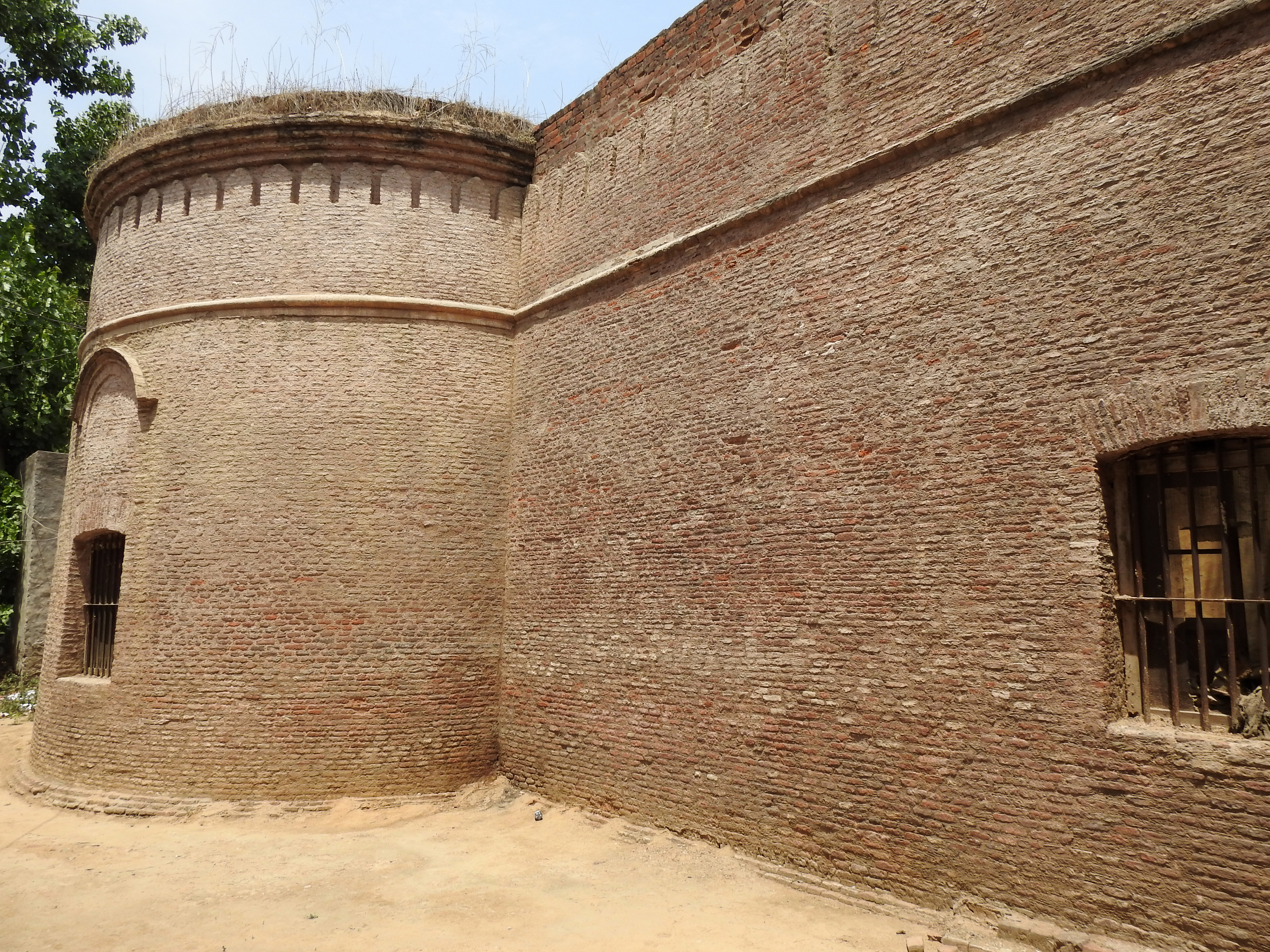
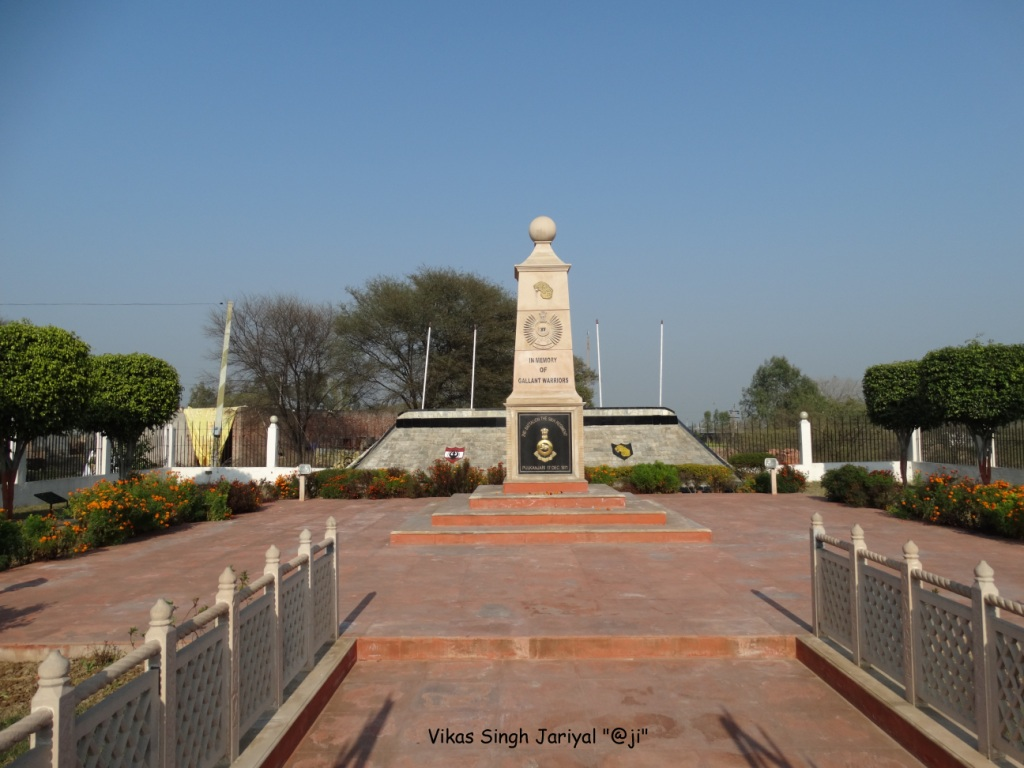
- Clockwise from top-left: Harmandir Sahib, Attari-Wagah Border Crossing, Ajnala Fort, 1971 War memorial at Pul Kanjri

- Location in Punjab
- Coordinates: 31°35′N 74°59′E
- Country: India
- State: Punjab
- Headquarters: Amritsar

Government
  - Commissioner of Police: Arun Pal Singh

Area
  - Total: 2,683 km^{2} (1,036 sq mi)

Population (2011)
  - Total: 2,490,656
  - Density: 928.3/km^{2} (2,404/sq mi)

Languages
  - Official: Punjabi
- Time zone: UTC+5:30 (IST)
- Vehicle registration: PB-01(commercial) PB-02, PB-14, PB-17, PB-18, PB-81, PB-89
- Literacy (7+): 76.27%
- Website: amritsar.nic.in

Amritsar district is one of the twenty three districts that make up the Indian state of Punjab. It is located in the Majha region of Punjab, the city of Amritsar is the headquarters of this district. The district is part of the Jalandhar division.

As of 2011, it is the second most populous district of Punjab (out of 23), after Ludhiana. It is a border district of Punjab and lies along the India-Pakistan border. Amritsar district borders the Pakistani Punjab districts of Lahore, Kasur, Shiekhupura along the Ravi river, Tarn Taran district to the south along the Sutlej river, Kapurthala district along the Beas river, and Gurdaspur District to the north.

== History ==
=== Sur Empire (1540 - 1554) ===
Sher Shah Suri, an Afghan monarch, defeated Kamran in 1540 and conquered Punjab, including Amritsar, which remained part of the Sur Empire until 1554.

=== Sikh Empire ===
The control of Amritsar was fully taken by Maharaja Ranjit Singh by 1802, after bringing all the Misls under his control. He also fortified Gobindgarh Fort along modern lines.

=== British ===
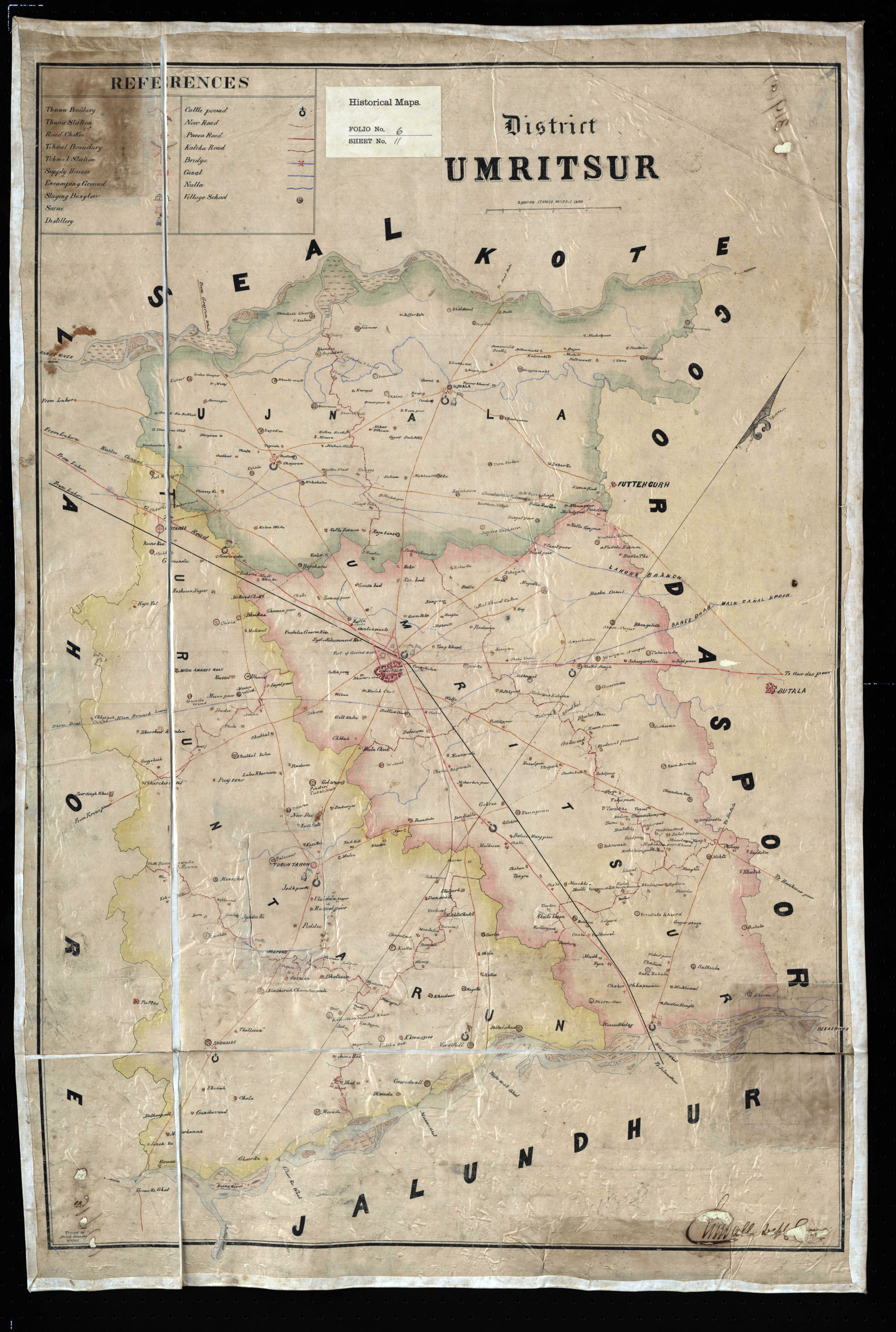
Map of Amritsar District, traced by Abdool Quadir in August 1875

Amritsar district was annexed by the British from its former Sikh rulers after the Second Anglo-Sikh War of 1848–1849. During British Rule Amritsar District was part of Lahore Division and was administratively subdivided into 3 tehsils namely - Amritsar, Ajnala and Tarn Taran. However, as part of the partition of India in 1947, Amritsar district was separated from the rest of the division and awarded to India. Some areas 186 villages, Patti and Khem Karan falling in the Lahore District (Kasur Tahsil) became part of Amritsar District at partition. During the partition period, the Muslim population of the district, some 46%, left for Pakistan while Hindus and Sikhs from West Punjab in newly created Pakistan migrated in the opposite direction. The Sikhs and Hindus (37% and 15.38%) were a majority in the Amritsar district jointly constituting about 52% of the total population before the partition of 1947.

== Climate ==
Amritsar has a humid subtropical climate (Koppen: Cwa), typical of Northwestern India and experiences four seasons primarily: winter season (December to March, when temperatures can drop to −1 °C (30 °F), summer season (April to June) where temperatures can reach 45 °C (113 °F), monsoon season (July to September) and post-monsoon season (October to November). Annual rainfall is about 703.4 millimetres (27.7 in). The lowest recorded temperature is −3.6 °C (25.5 °F), was recorded on 9 December 1996 and the highest temperature, 47.8 °C (118.0 °F), was recorded on 9 June 1995. The official weather station for the city is the civil aerodrome at Rajasansi. Weather records here date back to 15 November 1947.

Climate data for Amritsar Airport
Month	Jan	Feb	Mar	Apr	May	Jun	Jul	Aug	Sep	Oct	Nov	Dec	Year
Record high °C (°F)	26.8 (80.2)	32.2 (90.0)	36.2 (97.2)	44.1 (111.4)	47.7 (117.9)	47.8 (118.0)	45.6 (114.1)	40.7 (105.3)	40.6 (105.1)	38.3 (100.9)	34.2 (93.6)	28.5 (83.3)	47.8 (118.0)
Mean maximum °C (°F)	23 (73)	26.1 (79.0)	32 (90)	40.5 (104.9)	44 (111)	44.1 (111.4)	39.8 (103.6)	37.1 (98.8)	36.8 (98.2)	35.5 (95.9)	30.5 (86.9)	24.9 (76.8)	45.2 (113.4)
Mean daily maximum °C (°F)	18.4 (65.1)	21.7 (71.1)	26.8 (80.2)	34.2 (93.6)	39 (102)	39 (102)	35 (95)	34.2 (93.6)	34.1 (93.4)	32 (90)	27.1 (80.8)	21.1 (70.0)	30.2 (86.4)
Mean daily minimum °C (°F)	3.4 (38.1)	6.3 (43.3)	10.9 (51.6)	16.1 (61.0)	21.3 (70.3)	24.3 (75.7)	25.3 (77.5)	24.9 (76.8)	22.1 (71.8)	15.4 (59.7)	8.7 (47.7)	4.1 (39.4)	15.2 (59.4)
Mean minimum °C (°F)	−0.5 (31.1)	1.7 (35.1)	5.6 (42.1)	10.2 (50.4)	15.8 (60.4)	19.6 (67.3)	21.7 (71.1)	21.4 (70.5)	17.8 (64.0)	10.7 (51.3)	4.2 (39.6)	0.1 (32.2)	−1.2 (29.8)
Record low °C (°F)	−2.9 (26.8)	−2.6 (27.3)	2 (36)	6.4 (43.5)	9.6 (49.3)	15.6 (60.1)	18.2 (64.8)	18.8 (65.8)	13 (55)	7.3 (45.1)	−0.6 (30.9)	−3.6 (25.5)	−3.6 (25.5)
Average rainfall mm (inches)	26.2 (1.03)	38.6 (1.52)	38.4 (1.51)	21.4 (0.84)	26.7 (1.05)	61.2 (2.41)	210.1 (8.27)	197.4 (7.77)	77.5 (3.05)	16.1 (0.63)	6.3 (0.25)	13.6 (0.54)	733.4 (28.87)
Average rainy days (≥ 1.0 mm)	2.1	3.3	3.2	2	2.4	3.8	8.6	6.9	3.5	1.1	0.6	1.4	38.9
Average relative humidity (%)	74	70	64	47	38	48	72	77	69	67	73	76	65
Mean monthly sunshine hours	181.7	192.7	219.4	265.0	294.7	269.0	215.5	227.7	240.8	253.2	220.1	182.2	2,762

== Demographics ==
Historical population
Year	Pop.	±% p.a.
1901	764,821	—
1911	657,936	−1.49%
1921	694,261	+0.54%
1931	834,497	+1.86%
1941	1,044,457	+2.27%
1951	880,667	−1.69%
1961	1,010,093	+1.38%
1971	1,209,374	+1.82%
1981	1,460,497	+1.90%
1991	1,698,090	+1.52%
2001	2,157,020	+2.42%
2011	2,490,656	+1.45%

According to the 2011 census Amritsar district has a population of 2,490,656, roughly equal to the nation of Kuwait or the US state of Nevada. The number of literates in Amritsar district is 1,684,770 (67.6%), with 932,981 (70.8%) male literates and 751,789 (64.1%) female literates. The effective 7+ literacy of the district is 76.27%. The sex ratio of 889 females for every 1,000 males. The total Scheduled Caste population is 770,864 (30.95%) of the population. There were 488,898 households in the district in 2011.

=== Gender ===
The table below shows the sex ratio of Amritsar district in various census years.

Decadal sex ratio of Amritsar district by census years
Year (Census)	Sex Ratio
2011	889
2001	871
1991	873
1981	871
1971	856
1961	854
1951	841
1941	841
1931	803
1921	796
1911	781
1901	829

=== Religion ===
Religion in Amritsar district (2011)
Religion	Percent
Sikhism	68.94%
Hinduism	27.74%
Christianity	2.18%
Islam	0.50%
Other or not stated	0.64%

According to the 2011 census, Sikhs make up about 69% of the population while Hindus 28%, with a small minority of Christians (2%) and Muslims. Sikhs predominate in rural areas (over 90%), while Hindus and Sikhs are in nearly-equal numbers in urban areas. Christianity is growing rapidly especially among Dalits, while Islam, once the major religion in the district, is now insignificant.

Religion	2011 Census	
Religion	Number	%
Sikh	1,716,935	68.94%
Hindu	690,939	27.74%
Christian	54,344	2.18%
Muslim	12,502	0.50%
Others/NA	15,936	0.64%
Total	2,490,656	100.00%

Religion by tehsil	Sikh		Hindu		Christian		Muslim	
Religion by tehsil	Pop	%	Pop	%	Pop	%	Pop	%
Baba Bakala	293,743	91.65%	22,345	6.97%	1,734	0.54%	1,795	0.56%
Ajnala	384,497	86.85%	26,409	5.97%	29,742	6.72%	942	0.21%
Amritsar - I	258,259	82.71%	42,786	13.70%	6,060	1.94%	2,743	0.88%
Amritsar - II	780,436	55.15%	599,399	42.35%	16,808	1.19%	7,022	0.50%

The table below shows the population of different religions in absolute numbers in the urban and rural areas of Amritsar district.

Absolute numbers of different religious groups in Amritsar district
Religion	Urban (2011)	Rural (2011)	Urban (2001)	Rural (2001)	Urban (1991)	Rural (1991)
Sikh	6,63,145	10,53,790	6,28,207	17,55,368	3,14,947	13,40,258
Hindu	6,32,944	57,995	5,70,327	77,957	3,96,215	95,937
Christian	19,396	34,948	17,038	34,910	6,752	29,175
Muslim	7,451	5,051	3,690	3,481	940	1,303
Other religions	11,675	4,261	4,013	1,086	2,775	188

Religious groups in Amritsar District (British Punjab province era)
Religious group	1881		1891		1901		1911		1921		1931		1941	
Religious group	Pop.	%	Pop.	%	Pop.	%	Pop.	%	Pop.	%	Pop.	%	Pop.	%
Islam	413,207	46.26%	452,237	45.56%	474,976	46.39%	408,882	46.43%	423,724	45.59%	524,676	46.97%	657,695	46.52%
Hinduism (Note: 1931-1941: Including Ad-Dharmis)	262,531	29.39%	276,675	27.87%	280,985	27.44%	211,708	24.04%	204,435	22%	174,556	15.63%	217,431	15.38%
Sikhism	216,337	24.22%	261,452	26.34%	264,329	25.82%	253,941	28.83%	287,004	30.88%	399,951	35.8%	510,845	36.13%
Christianity	869	0.1%	1,609	0.16%	2,078	0.2%	4,763	0.54%	12,773	1.37%	16,619	1.49%	25,973	1.84%
Jainism	312	0.03%	718	0.07%	1,439	0.14%	1,386	0.16%	1,375	0.15%	1,272	0.11%	1,911	0.14%
Zoroastrianism	9	0%	5	0%	19	0%	48	0.01%	58	0.01%	42	0%	21	0%
Buddhism	0	0%	0	0%	0	0%	0	0%	5	0%	0	0%	0	0%
Judaism	—N/a	—N/a	0	0%	2	0%	0	0%	0	0%	4	0%	0	0%
Others	1	0%	1	0%	0	0%	0	0%	0	0%	0	0%	0	0%
Total population	893,266	100%	992,697	100%	1,023,828	100%	880,728	100%	929,374	100%	1,117,120	100%	1,413,876	100%
Note: British Punjab province era district borders are not an exact match in the present-day due to various bifurcations to district borders — which since created new districts — throughout the historic Punjab Province region during the post-independence era that have taken into account population increases.

Religion in the Tehsils of Amritsar District (1921)
Tehsil	Hinduism		Islam		Sikhism		Christianity		Jainism		Others (Note: Including Buddhism, Zoroastrianism, Judaism, Tribals, others, or not stated)		Total	
Tehsil	Pop.	%	Pop.	%	Pop.	%	Pop.	%	Pop.	%	Pop.	%	Pop.	%
Amritsar Tehsil	126,586	28.08%	195,255	43.32%	124,577	27.64%	2,961	0.66%	1,318	0.29%	63	0.01%	450,760	100%
Taran Taran Tehsil	52,332	17.77%	119,232	40.49%	120,227	40.83%	2,626	0.89%	48	0.02%	0	0%	294,465	100%
Ajnala Tehsil	25,517	13.86%	109,237	59.32%	42,200	22.92%	7,186	3.9%	9	0%	0	0%	184,149	100%
Note: British Punjab province era tehsil borders are not an exact match in the present-day due to various bifurcations to tehsil borders — which since created new tehsils — throughout the historic Punjab Province region during the post-independence era that have taken into account population increases.

Religion in the Tehsils of Amritsar District (1941)
Tehsil	Hinduism		Islam		Sikhism		Christianity		Jainism		Others (Note: Including Anglo-Indian Christians, British Christians, Buddhism, Zoroastrianism, Judaism, Tribals, others, or not stated)		Total	
Tehsil	Pop.	%	Pop.	%	Pop.	%	Pop.	%	Pop.	%	Pop.	%	Pop.	%
Amritsar Tehsil	175,771	22.27%	359,025	45.49%	243,297	30.83%	8,968	1.14%	1,901	0.24%	197	0.02%	789,159	100%
Taran Taran Tehsil	26,245	6.77%	157,731	40.69%	199,562	51.48%	3,654	0.94%	10	0%	466	0.12%	387,668	100%
Ajnala Tehsil	15,415	6.5%	140,939	59.46%	67,986	28.68%	12,708	5.36%	0	0%	1	0%	237,049	100%
Note1: British Punjab province era tehsil borders are not an exact match in the present-day due to various bifurcations to tehsil borders — which since created new tehsils — throughout the historic Punjab Province region during the post-independence era that have taken into account population increases. Note2: Tehsil religious breakdown figures for Christianity only includes local Christians, labelled as "Indian Christians" on census. Does not include Anglo-Indian Christians or British Christians, who were classified under "Other" category.

=== Language ===
Languages of Amritsar district (First Language) (2011)
1. Punjabi (94.3%)
2. Hindi (4.80%)
3. Others (0.91%)

At the time of the 2011 census, 94.29% of the population spoke Punjabi and 4.80% Hindi as their first language. Hindi-speakers almost all lived in urban areas.

== Health ==
The table below shows the data from the district nutrition profile of children below the age of 5 years, in Amritsar, as of year 2020.

District nutrition profile of children under 5 years of age in Amritsar, year 2020
Indicators	Number of children (<5 years)	Percent (2020)	Percent (2016)
Stunted	37,510	19%	22%
Wasted	23,052	12%	11%
Severely wasted	12,174	6%	3%
Underweight	21,716	11%	13%
Overweight/obesity	12,116	6%	3%
Anemia	127,880	74%	45%
Total children	193,551		

The table below shows the district nutrition profile of Amritsar of women between the ages of 15 and 49 years, as of year 2020.

District nutritional profile of Amritsar of women of 15–49 years, in 2020
Indicators	Number of women (15–49 years)	Percent (2020)	Percent (2016)
Underweight (BMI <18.5 kg/m^2)	77,308	10%	11%
Overweight/obesity	339,578	42%	30%
Hypertension	288,120	36%	16%
Diabetes	108,135	13%	NA
Anemia (non-preg)	422,426	53%	53%
Anemia (preg)	13,454	35%	58%
Total women (preg)	38,331		
Total women	802,785		

The table below shows the current use of family planning methods by currently married women between the age of 15 and 49 years, in Amritsar district.

Family planning methods used by women between the ages of 15 and 49 years, in Amritsar district
Method	Total (2015–16)	Urban (2015–16)	Rural (2015–16)
Female sterilisation	36.9%	33.1%	41.5%
Male sterilisation	1.2%	0.3%	2.3%
IUD/PPIUD	9.3%	10.6%	7.6%
Pill	2.2%	2.6%	1.7%
Condom	22.1%	26.3%	17.0%
Any modern method	71.6%	72.9%	70.1%
Any method	81.0%	84.5%	76.6%
Total unmet need	4.0%	3.6%	4.6%
Unmet need for spacing	1.7%	1.1%	2.5%

The table below shows the number of road accidents and people affected in Amritsar district by year.

Road accidents and people affected in Amritsar district by year
Year	Accidents	Killed	Injured	Vehicles Involved
2022	285	343	137	350
2021	280	231	120	296
2020	243	190	120	315
2019	372	299	188	401

== Economy ==
The table below shows the number of registered working factories and workers employed by selected manufacturing industries in Amritsar district as of 2017.

Number of registered working factories and workers employed by selected manufacturing industries in Amritsar district in 2017
Industry	Factories	Workers
Basic metals	1	2
Computers, Electronics and Optical products	11	147
Chemicals and chemical products	6	75
Transport equipment	1	20
Furniture	2	11
Non-metallic mineral products	3	69
Beverages	21	189
Food products and Beverages products	14	134

== District administration ==
- The Deputy Commissioner, an officer belonging to the Indian Administrative Service, is in charge of general administration of the district. He is generally a middle-level IAS officer of Punjab Cadre. As the District Magistrate, he also effectively heads the police force. The Deputy Commissioner of Amritsar is Harpreet Singh Sudan, appointed in 2022.
- Administration of departments such as public works, health, education, agriculture, animal husbandry, etc. is headed by district officers who belong to various Punjab state services.
- The Commissioner of Police, an officer belonging to the Indian Police Service is responsible for maintaining law and order in the district. He is assisted by officers of the Punjab Police Service and other Punjab Police officials.
- The Divisional Forest Officer, an officer belonging to the Indian Forest Service is responsible for the management of forests and wildlife in the district. He is assisted by officers of the Punjab Forest Service, other Punjab Forest officials, and Punjab Wildlife officials.
- A Municipal corporation is responsible for the management of public works and health systems in the city of Amritsar. The municipal corporation is a democratic body of councillors and is presided over by the Mayor, who is elected by the councillors. At present, there are more than 70 councillors.

=== Subdistricts in Amritsar district ===
There are four tehsils in Amritsar district as per 2011 census.

#	Tehsil	District
1	Amritsar- II	Amritsar
2	Ajnala	Amritsar
3	Baba Bakala	Amritsar
4	Amritsar -I	Amritsar
5	Majitha	Amritsar
6	Lopoke	Amritsar

According to the Indian government's integrated online directory, Amritsar district is divided into the following subdistricts (tehsils/subdivisions) and blocks:

- Subdistricts
  1. Ajnala
  2. Amritsar -I
  3. Amritsar- II
  4. Baba Bakala
  5. Lopoke
  6. Majitha
- Blocks:
  1. Ajnala
  2. Attari
  3. Chogawan
  4. Harshe Chhina
  5. Jandiala Guru
  6. Majitha-1
  7. Majitha-2
  8. Ramdas
  9. Rayya
  10. Tarsikka
  11. Verka

== Politics ==
Constituency number	Constituency name	Reserved for (SC/None)	Electors (2017)	District
15	Amritsar North	None	175,908	Amritsar
16	Amritsar West	SC	179,766	Amritsar
17	Amritsar Central	None	135,954	Amritsar
18	Amritsar East	None	153,629	Amritsar
19	Amritsar South	None	148,809	Amritsar
20	Attari	SC	173,543	Amritsar

=== MLA ===
No.	Constituency	Name of MLA	Party	Bench
11	Ajnala	Kuldip Singh Dhaliwal	Aam Aadmi Party	Government
12	Rajasansi	Sukhbinder Singh Sarkaria	Indian National Congress	Opposition
13	Majitha	Ganieve Kaur Majithia	Shiromani Akali Dal	Opposition
14	Jandiala (SC)	Harbhajan Singh E.T.O.	Aam Aadmi Party	Government
15	Amritsar North	Kunwar Vijay Pratap Singh	Aam Aadmi Party	Government
16	Amritsar West (SC)	Jasbir Singh Sandhu	Aam Aadmi Party	Government
17	Amritsar Central	Ajay Gupta	Aam Aadmi Party	Government
18	Amritsar East	Jeevan Jyot Kaur	Aam Aadmi Party	Government
19	Amritsar South	Inderbir Singh Nijjar	Aam Aadmi Party	Government
20	Attari (SC)	Jaswinder Singh	Aam Aadmi Party	Government
25	Baba Bakala (SC)	Dalbir Singh Tong	Aam Aadmi Party	Government

== List of DC ==
#	Name	Assumed office	Left office
1	L. Saunders	20 April 1849	31 December 1852
2	J. Dennison	1 January 1853	31 July 1853
3	T.H. Copper	1 August 1853	24 April 1860
4	A.J. Farrington	25 April 1860	31 May 1866
5	G. Lewin	1 June 1866	13 June 1867
6	T.W. Smyth	14 June 1867	24 July 1867
7	G. Lewin	25 July 1867	14 August 1867
8	D.G. Barkley	15 August 1867	3 October 1867
9	G. Lewin	24 October 1867	8 December 1867
10	Major H.B. Urmston	9 December 1867	31 July 1868
11	L. Griffin	1 August 1868	13 January 1869
12	D. Fitzpatrick	14 January 1869	14 March 1869
13	W. Coldstream	15 March 1869	15 March 1869
14	F.M. Birch	16 March 1869	31 July 1869
15	J.W. Gardiner	1 August 1869	1 September 1870
16	F.M. Birch	2 September 1870	31 July 1871
17	C.H. Hall	1 August 1871	16 January 1872
18	C.H. Marshall	17 January 1872	12 April 1872
19	C.H. Hall	13 April 1872	27 May 1872
20	J.A. Montgomery	28 May 1872	29 May 1872
21	J.W. Smyth	30 May 1872	10 September 1872
22	C.H. Hall	11 September 1872	2 March 1873
23	W. Coldstream	30 March 1873	21 October 1873
24	C.H. Hall	22 October 1873	16 April 1874
25	T.W. Smyth	17 April 1874	30 August 1874
26	C. Mcheile	31 August 1874	30 September 1874
27	T.W. Smyth	1 October 1874	1 November 1874
28	C.H. Hall	2 November 1874	7 June 1876
29	C.R. Hawkins	8 June 1876	20 October 1876
30	C.H. Hall	21 October 1876	13 March 1877
31	J.D. Tremlett	14 March 1877	17 July 1877
32	W.P. Woodward	18 July 1877	19 July 1877
33	J.W. Gardner	20 July 1877	2 January 1878
34	W. Young	3 January 1878	31 January 1878
35	J.W. Gardiner	1 February 1878	1 September 1878
36	C.R. Hawkins	2 September 1878	14 November 1878
37	J.D. Tremlett	15 November 1878	2 February 1879
38	C.R. Hawkings	3 February 1879	1 August 1881
39	R. Clarke	2 August 1881	3 January 1882
40	J.W. Gardiner	4 January 1882	1 March 1882
41	G.R. Hawkins	2 March 1882	21 March 1883
42	G. Knox	22 March 1883	9 June 1884
43	C.F. Massy	10 June 1884	1 October 1884
44	C.R. Hawkins	2 October 1884	11 November 1884
45	R. Udny	12 November 1884	13 January 1885
46	R.M. Lang	14 January 1885	4 September 1886
47	J. Ronnie	5 September 1886	4 October 1886
48	R.M. Lang	5 October 1886	2 September 1888
49	J.A. Grant	3 September 1888	17 October 1888
50	R.M. Lang	18 October 1888	15 September 1889
51	J.A. Grant	16 September 1889	18 October 1890
52	R.M. Lang	19-10- 1889	2 September 1890
53	F.P. Joung	1 April 1891	14 October 1892
54	C.F. Massy	15 October 1892	6 March 1893
55	J.A. Grant	7 March 1893	7 March 1893
56	A. Harrison	8 March 1893	2 April 1893
57	R.M. Lang	0304-1893	25 March 1895
58	E.R. Abbott, Esqurie	27 March 1895	5 April 1895
59	A. Kensington, Esouire	5 April 1895	4 March 1896
60	Captain C.M. Dallas	4 April 1896	9 December 1896
61	Captain Burlton	09-10 1896	26 December 1896
62	Captain C.M. Dallas	26 December 1896	16 July 1897
63	Captain H.Fox Strangways	16 July 1897	17 July 1897
64	A.E. Martineau, Esquire	17 July 1897	20 November 1897
65	Captain C.M. Dallas	20 November 1897	31 March 1898
66	W. Chevis, Esquire	31-03- 1898	25 August 1898
67	M.L. Waring, Esquire	25-08- 1898	25 October 1898
68	W. Chevis, Esquire	25 October 1898	30 July 1899
69	A. Calvert, Esquire	30-07- 1899	3 August 1899
70	L. French, Esquire	3 August 1899	23 September 1899
71	W. Chevis, Esquire	23-09- 1899	5 November 1899
72	A.M. Stow, Esquire	5 November 1899	14 July 1900
73	A. Langley, Esquire	14 April 1900	14 May 1900
74	A.M. Stow, Esquire	14 May 1900	13 June 1900
75	W.Le. Malan, Esquire	13 June 1900	14 November 1900
76	J.F. Connqlly, Esquire	14 November 1900	20 April 1902
77	E.D. Maclagan, Esquire	20 April 1902	6 August 1902
78	B.H. Bird, Esquire	6 August 1902	18 October 1902
79	E.D. Maclagan, Esquire	18 October 1902	29 June 1903
80	H.A. Sama, Esquire	30 June 1903	15 October 1903
81	E.D. Maclagan, Esquire	16 October 1903	20 April 1904
82	H.A. Sama, Esquire	21 April 1904	18-12- 1904
83	O.M. King, Esquire	20 December 1904	21 July 1905
84	H.S. Williamson, Esquire	22 July 1905	1 September 1905
85	O.M. King, Esquire	2 September 1905	28 March 1906
86	H.A. Casson, Esquire	29 March 1906	27 March 1907
87	B.H. Bird, Esquire	28 March 1907	18 April 1907
88	Miles Irvingh, Esquire	19 April 1907	3 March 1908
89	H.A. Casson, Esquire	3 March 1908	13 April 1909
90	O.F. Lumsden, Esquire	14 April 1909	27 July 1911
91	R.B. Whitehead, Esquire	28 July 1911	22 October 1911
92	O.F. Lumsden, Esquire	23 October 1911	12 October 1911
93	Lt.Col. C.D. Egerton, I.A.	13 October 1911	18 February 1912
94	P.L. Barker, Esquire	19 February 1912	26 April 1912
95	H.D. Cralk, Esquire	27 April 1912	18 May 1912
96	J. Addison, Esquire	19 May 1912	3 October 1912
97	Lt. Col. C.R. Egerton	4 October 1912	1913
98	C.M. King	1913	1916
99	Miles Irving	24 February 1919	5 August 1919
100	Henry Duffield Craik	2 February 1921	26 May 1921
101	J..M. Dunnett	27 May 1921	14 November 1923
102	F.H. Puckle	15 November 1923	20 April 1928
103	R.H. Crump	17 April 1928	1929
104	W.G. Bradford	1929	14 June 1930
105	R.H. Crump	14 June 1930	1 December 1930
106	A.V. Askinth	1 December 1930	1 September 1931
107	G.M. Jenkins	1 September 1931	4 November 1931
108	J.D. Penny	4 November 1931	2 January 1932
109	A. Macfar Quhar	28 February 1933	18 July 1934
110	Rai Sahib Izzet Rai	18 July 1934	31 August 1934
111	A. Macfar Quhar	31 January 1934	1 July 1936
112	I.E. Jones	1 July 1936	2 September 1936
113	A.A. Macdonald	2 September 1936	28 November 1938
114	I.E. Jones	28 November 1938	2 October 1939
115	A.A. Macdonald	2 October 1939	22 August 1941
116	Sh. Sundar Das	22 August 1941	25 September 1941
117	E.D. Moon	25 September 1941	9 July 1943
118	Sh. Rosham Lal	9 July 1943	16 July 1943
119	L.D. Addison	16 July 1943	22 April 1946
120	J.D. Frazer	22 April 1946	22 May 1947
121	Mr. G.M. Brander.I.G.S.	24 May 1947	22 August 1947
122	Sh. Nukul Sen.I.C.S.	23 August 1947	6 October 1947
123	Sh. Devinder Singh P.C.S.	7 October 1947	10 October 1947
124	Sh. B.S. Narinder Singh I.A.S.	11 October 1947	11 July 1952
125	Sh. N.N. Kashyap I.C.S.	12 July 1952	14 October 1953
126	Sh. R.N. Chopra I.C.S.	15 October 1953	22 September 1954
127	Sh. S.K. Shhibber I.A.S.	23 September 1954	27 May 1956
128	Sh. H.B. Lal I.A.S.	28 May 1956	2 December 1957
129	Sh. A.N. Kashyap I.A.S.	3 December 1957	8 June 1958
130	Sh. Balwant Singh I.A.S.	9 June 1958	31 May 1960
131	Sh. H.S. Ach Reja I.A.S.	1 June 1960	8 May 1961
132	Sh. Sunder Singh P.C.S.	9 May 1961	18 November 1962
133	Sh. P.N. Bhalla I.A.S.	19 November 1962	16 May 1964
134	Sh. Lall Singh Aujla P.S.S.	17 May 1964	30 June 1964
135	Sh. Iqbal Singh I.A.S.	1 July 1964	8 July 1965
136	Sh. S.S. Bedi I.A.S.	9 July 1965	15 December 1966
137	Sh. Kulwant Singh I.A.S.	16 December 1966	9 May 1969
138	Sh. K.S.Bains I.A.S.	10 May 1969	26 August 1971
139	Sh. Sukhbir Singh I.A.S.	27 August 1971	15 October 1975
140	Sh. J.D.Khanna I.A.S.	16 October 1975	21 April 1977
141	Sh. K.S. Janjua I.A.S.	22 April 1977	16 April 1978
142	Sh. Jai Singh Gill I.A.S.	16 April 1978	24 April 1980
143	Sh. Bikramjit Singh I.A.S.	25 April 1980	27 August 1980
144	Sh. S.M.S. Chahal I.A.S.	28 August 1980	27 August 1981
145	Sh. Sardar Singh I.A.S.	27 August 1981	15 July 1983
146	Sh. Gurdev Singh I.A.S.	16 July 1983	3 June 1984
147	Sh. Ramesh Inder Singh Mandher I.A.S.	4 June 1984	6 July 1987
148	Sh. Sarabjit Singh I.A.S.	7 July 1987	10 May 1992
149	Sh. Karanbir Singh Sidhu I.A.S.	11 May 1992	11 August 1996
150	Sh. A.S. Chhatwal I.A.S.	12 August 1996	29 August 1996
151	Sh. Amarjit Singh I.A.S.	30 August 1996	13 July 1998
152	Sh. Narinderjit Singh I.A.S.	13 July 1998	10 January 2002
153	Sh. Swinder Singh Puri I.A.S.	10 January 2002	7 November 2002
154	Sh. Iqbal Singh Sidhu I.A.S.	7 November 2002	20 May 2003
155	Sh. Raminder Singh I.A.S.	20 May 2003	23 December 2004
156	Sh. Kirandeep Singh Bhullar I.A.S	23 December 2004	19 March 2007
157	Sh. Kahan Singh Pannu I.A.S	19 March 2007	18 May 2008
158	Sh. Tejveer Singh I.A.S	18 May 2008	29 May 2008
159	Sh. Kahan Singh Pannu I.A.S	2 June 2008	10 September 2008
160	Sh. Khushi Ram I.A.S	13 September 2008	1 October 2008
161	Sh. Kahan Singh Pannu I.A.S	2 October 2008	10 February 2009
162	Sh. Bhagwant Singh, I.A.S	10 February 2009	25 May 2009
163	Sh. Kahan Singh Pannu I.A.S	25 May 2009	16 June 2011
164	Sh. Rajat Agarwal I.A.S	16 June 2011	2 July 2012
165	Sh. Priyank Bharti I.A.S	2 July 2012	27 August 2012
166	Sh. Rajat Agarwal I.A.S	27 August 2012	14 September 2013
167	Sh. Ravi Bhagat I.A.S	19 September 2013	31 May 2015
168	Sh. Pardeep Kumar Sabharwal I.A.S	1 June 2015	17 July 2015
169	Sh. Ravi Bhagat I.A.S	20 July 2015	1 February 2016
170	Sh. Varun Roojam I.A.S	2 February 2016	9 November 2016
171	Sh. Basant Garg I.A.S	14 November 2016	17 March 2017
172	Sh. Kamaldeep Singh Sangha I.A.S	17 March 2017	18 February 2019
173	Sh. Shivdular Singh Dhillon I.A.S	18 February 2019	31 July 2020
174	Sh. Gurpreet Singh Khaira, IAS	31 July 2020	5 April 2022
175	Sh. Harpreet Singh Sudan, IAS	5 April 2022	24 May 2023
176	Sh. Amit Talwar, IAS	24 May 2023	16 October 2023
177	Sh. Ghanshyam Thori, IAS	17 October 2023	till date

== Notable people ==
- Jaspal Bhatti, a comedian and television personality
- Harpinder Singh Chawla, a dental surgeon, medical researcher and writer, known for his work in paediatric dentistry, and receiver of Padma Shri and Punjab Rattan awards
- Baldev Singh Dhillon, an agricultural scientist and vice-chancellor of Punjab Agricultural University from 2011 to 2021
- Jawahir Singh Kapur, Sikh reformer, civil servant, author, poet, publicist, editor, leader and founder of Khalsa College.
- Khushbir Kaur, a racewalk athlete and receiver of Arjun award
- Kapil Sharma, a comedian, television host and Bollywood actor
- Arpinder Singh, a triple jump athlete
- Daljit Singh, an influential ophthalmologist, who did pioneer work and important research in his field
- Janak Raj Talwar, cardiothoracic surgeon
- Surinder Vasal, a geneticist and plant breeder, known for his contributions in developing a maize variety with higher content of usable protein
- Gurpreet Singh Wander, an influential cardiologist and academic
