= Golden Temple =

Sikh religious site in Punjab, India

- Harmandir Sāhib; Darbār Sāhib
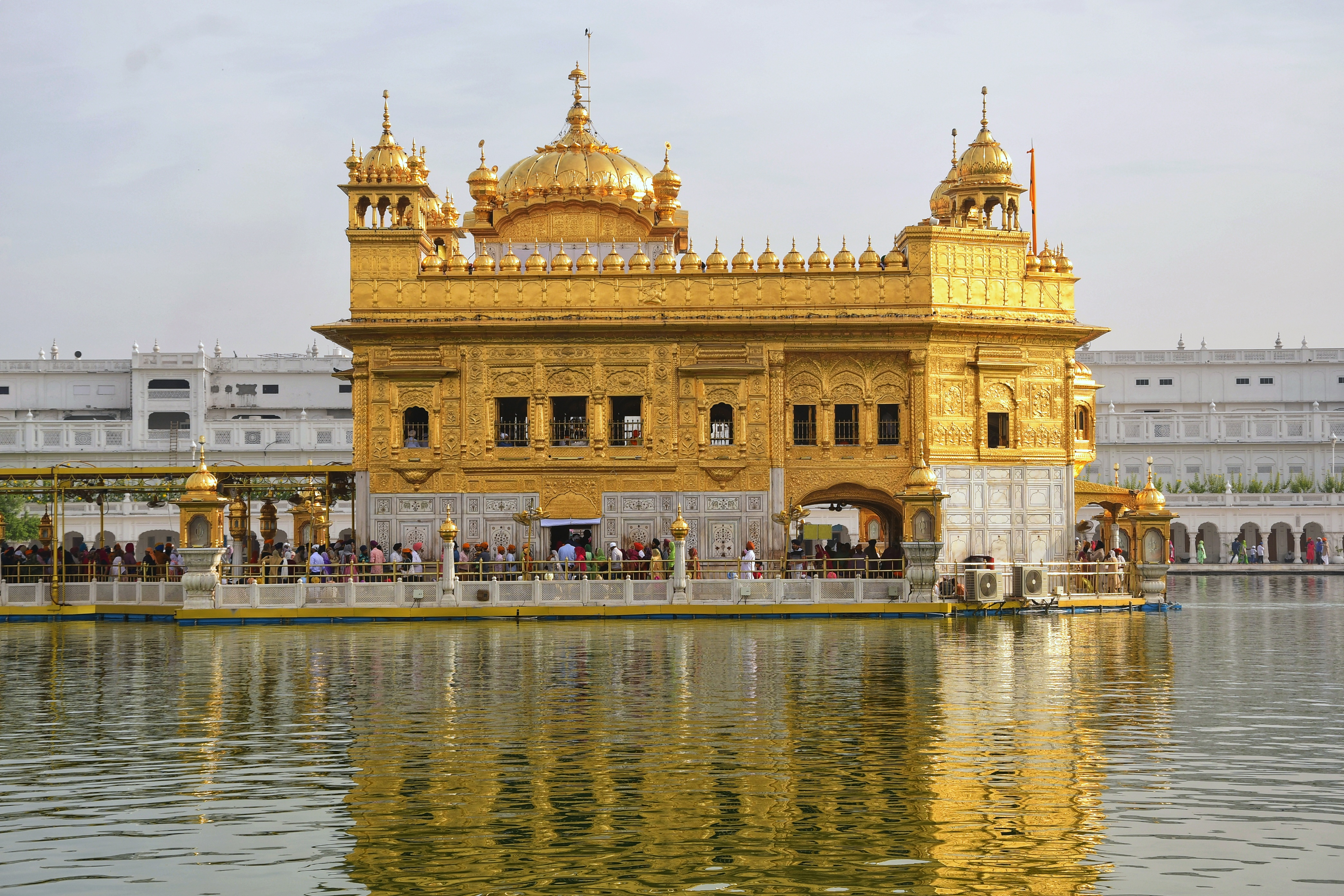

- Location within Punjab Location within India Location within Asia

Religion
- Affiliation: Sikhism

Location
- Location: Amritsar
- State: Punjab
- Country: India
- Coordinates: 31°37′12″N 74°52′35″E

Architecture
- Style: Sikh architecture
- Founder: Guru Arjan
- Groundbreaking: December 1581; 444 years ago
- Completed: 1589 (temple); 16 August 1604 (with Adi Granth)

Website
- sgpc.net/sri-harmandir-sahib/

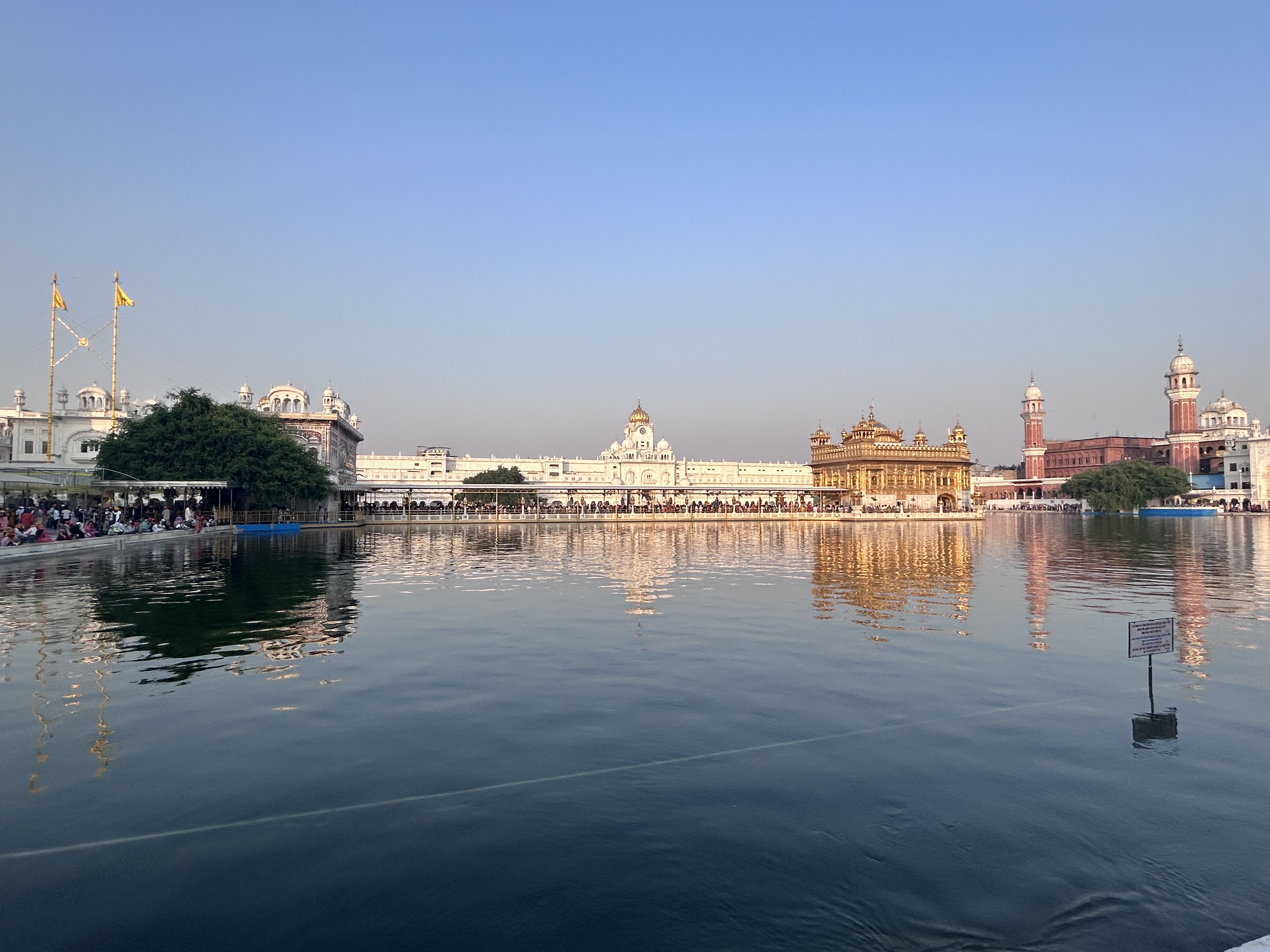
Complete view of Golden Temple complex

The Golden Temple (Note: also known as the Harmandir Sāhib lit. 'House of God', Panjabi: harimandara sāhiba, pronounced [ɦəɾᵊmən̪d̪əɾᵊ saːɦ(ɪ)bᵊ], or the Darbār Sāhib, lit. ''exalted court'', Punjabi pronunciation: [d̪əɾᵊbaːɾᵊ saːɦ(ɪ)bᵊ]) is a gurdwara located in Amritsar, Punjab, India. It is the pre-eminent spiritual site of Sikhism and its holiest site. The gurdwara complex is a collection of buildings around the sanctum sanctorum and the sarovar (holy pool), known as the Amrit Sarovar. One of these is Akal Takht, part of the Panj Takht (five seats of authority in Sikhism) and the chief centre of religious authority of Sikhism. Additional buildings include a clock tower, the offices of the Shiromani Gurdwara Parbandhak Committee, a museum and a langar—a free Sikh community-run kitchen that offers a vegetarian meal to all visitors without discrimination. Over 150,000 people visit the shrine every day for worship, being one of the most visited religious sites in the world. The gurdwara complex has been nominated as a UNESCO World Heritage Site, and its application is pending on the tentative list of UNESCO.

The pool on the site of the gurdwara was completed by the fourth Sikh Guru, Guru Ram Das, in 1577. Guru Arjan finalised the constructions at the site. In 1604, Guru Arjan, the fifth Sikh Guru, placed a copy of the Adi Granth in the Golden Temple and played a prominent role in its development. The gurdwara was repeatedly rebuilt by the Sikhs after they became a target of persecution and was destroyed several times by the Mughal and invading Afghan armies. Maharaja Ranjit Singh, after founding the Sikh Empire, rebuilt it in marble and copper in 1809, and overlaid the sanctum with gold leaf in 1830. This has led to the name the Golden Temple.

The Golden Temple is spiritually the most significant shrine in Sikhism. It became a centre of the Singh Sabha Movement between 1883 and the 1920s, and the Punjabi Suba Movement between 1947 and 1966. In the early 1980s, the gurdwara became a centre of conflict between the Indian government and a radical movement led by Jarnail Singh Bhindranwale. In 1984, Prime Minister Indira Gandhi sent in the Indian Army as part of Operation Blue Star, leading to the deaths of thousands of soldiers, militants and civilians, as well as causing significant damage to the gurdwara and the destruction of the nearby Akal Takht—the prime seat of authority for the Sikhs. The gurdwara complex was again rebuilt after the 1984 attack.

The Golden Temple is an open house of worship for all people, from all walks of life and faiths. It has a square plan with four entrances, and a circumambulation path around the pool. The four entrances of the gurdwara symbolise the Sikh belief in equality and the Sikh view that people from all groups, castes and ethnicities are welcome at their holy place.

== Nomenclature ==
The Harmandir Sahib is also spelled as Harimandar or Harimandir Sahib. It is also called the Durbār Sahib, which means "sacred audience", as well as the Golden Temple for its gold leaf-covered sanctum centre. The word "Harmandir" is composed of two words: "Hari", which scholars translate as "God ", and "mandir", which means "house". "Sahib" is further appended to the shrine's name, the term often used within Sikh tradition to denote respect for places of religious significance. The Sikh tradition has several gurdwaras named "Harmandir Sahib", such as those in Kiratpur and Patna. Of these, the one in Amritsar is most revered.

== History ==
=== Background ===
It is difficult to reconstruct the history of the complex due to a lack of records. The few Persian sources which exist tend to be biased, thus most of the early history of the site is reconstructed from what is found in hagiographical Sikh literature, especially the sakhi, mahima, gurbilas, and panth prakash genres. However, historical Sikh sources are semi-historical and generally reverential toward the site, being written by poets rather than historians, focusing more on theological aspects rather than objective history.

==== Mythology ====
Sikh sources claim that the site was chosen as it had long been a site associated with religion but fell into obscurity before being rediscovered by the Sikh gurus. There are myths regarding the antecedents of the site, with a Puranic-style one declaring the site as an amrit kund ("reservoir of nectar"). Another claim linked to the Ramayana asserts that the site was named Iksvakusar, named after the figure Iksvaku who supposedly performed yajnas at it. Furthermore, there is a legend that Rama was injured by his sons Lava and Kush at the spot that the Dukh Bhanjani Beri now exists. The sons brought amrit to their father to heal him, with the excess believed to have been poured into a closeby pond, which now is known as the Amrit Sarovar. However, the importance of the site fell out of favour during the Buddhist era as per these beliefs, although some Sikh writers, such as Gurnam Singh, have attempted to link the site to Buddha and his bhikshus, or with Padmasambhava.

==== Discovery by the Sikh gurus ====
According to Madanjit Kaur, the low-lying location was likely originally a jungle, comprising a pond with the Dukh Bhanjani Beri tree (associated with healing properties) and a number of other trees. The pond was located near a caravan route headed northwest. There were hamlets located nearby, such as Sultanwind, Tung, Gumtala, and Gilwali. According to Giani Gian Singh's Tawarikh Guru Khalsa, Guru Nanak visited the site in 1502 during one of his udasis (travel itineraries). An early Sikh story involving the site claims that Amar Das discovered it while looking for medicinal herbs to heal a skin ailment of Guru Angad, finding a healing plant on the bank of the pool. Another legend involves Rajani, daughter of Rai Duni Chand (the kardar [revenue collector] of Patti) and wife of a leper, who brought her husband to the pool near the Dukh Bhanjani Beri which cured him. When Ram Das (not yet the guru) heard the tale of Rajani, he was inspired and would visit the area alongside a sangat from Goindwal.

According to the Sikh historical records, the land that became Amritsar and houses the Harimandir Sahib was chosen by Guru Amar Das, the third Guru of the Sikh tradition. It was then called Guru Da Chakk, after he had asked his disciple Ram Das to find land to start a new town with a man-made pool as its central point. After Guru Ram Das succeeded Guru Amar Das in 1574, and in the face of hostile opposition from the sons of Amar Das, Ram Das founded the town that came to be known as "Ramdaspur". He started by completing the pool with the help of Baba Buddha (not to be confused with the Buddha of Buddhism). Ram Das built his new official centre and home next to it. He invited merchants and artisans from other parts of India to settle in the new town with him.

Ramdaspur town expanded during the time of Guru Arjan financed by donations and constructed by voluntary work. The town grew to become the city of Amritsar, and the area grew into the temple complex). The construction activity between 1574 and 1604 is described in Mahima Prakash Vartak, a semi-historical Sikh hagiography text likely composed in 1741, and the earliest known document dealing with the lives of all the ten Gurus. Guru Arjan installed the scripture of Sikhism inside the new gurdwara in 1604. Continuing the efforts of Ram Das, Guru Arjan established Amritsar as a primary Sikh pilgrimage destination. He wrote a voluminous amount of Sikh scripture including the popular Sukhmani Sahib.

=== Construction ===
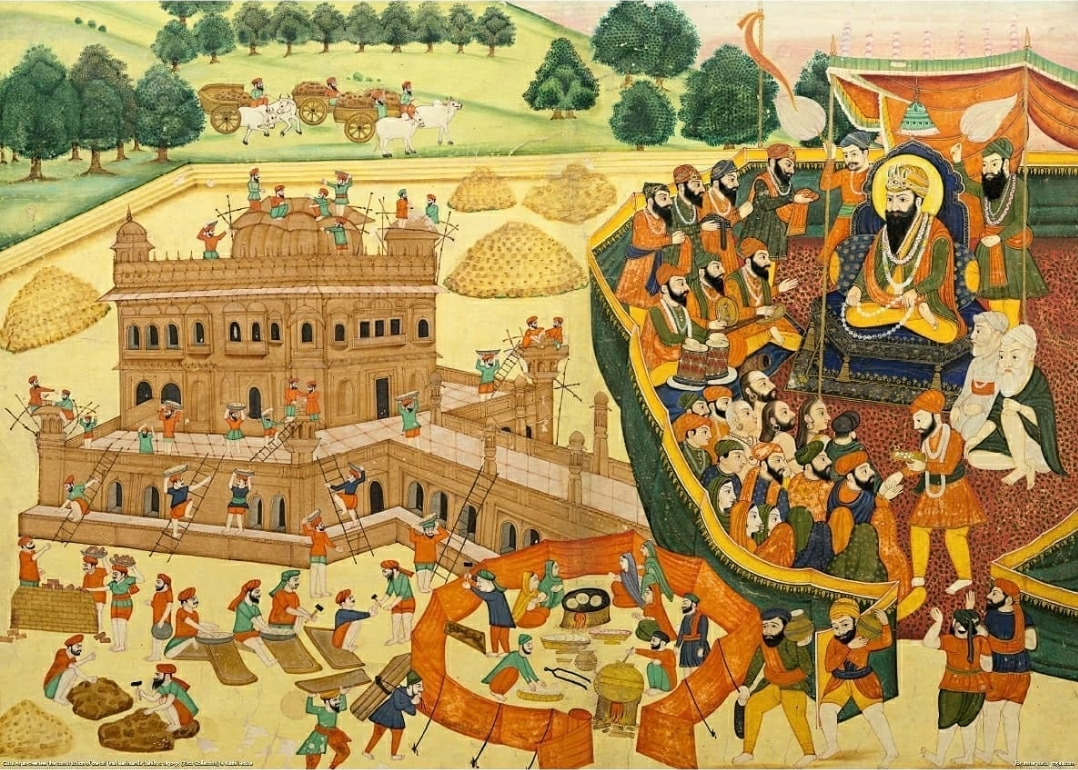
Guru Arjan overseeing the construction of the original Golden Temple (Harmandir Sahib), painting from c. 1890–95

Guru Ram Das acquired the land for the site. Two versions of stories exist on how he acquired this land. In one, based on a Gazetteer record, the land was purchased with Sikh donations of 700 rupees from the people and owners of the village of Tung. In another version, Emperor Akbar is stated to have donated the land to the wife of Ram Das.

In 1581, Guru Arjan initiated construction. During the construction the pool was kept empty and dry. It took eight years to complete the first version of the Harmandir Sahib. Guru Arjan planned a gurdwara at a level lower than the city to emphasise humility and the need to efface one's ego before entering the premises to meet the Guru. He also demanded that the gurdwara compound be open on all sides to emphasise that it was open to all. The sanctum inside the pool where his Guru seat was, had only one bridge to emphasise that the end goal was one, states Arvind-Pal Singh Mandair. In 1589, the gurdwara made with bricks was complete. Guru Arjan is believed by some later sources to have invited the Sufi saint Mian Mir of Lahore to lay its foundation stone, signalling pluralism and that the Sikh tradition welcomed all. This belief is however unsubstantiated. According to Sikh traditional sources such as Sri Gur Suraj Parkash Granth it was laid by Guru Arjan himself. After the inauguration, the pool was filled with water. On 16 August 1604, Guru Arjan completed expanding and compiling the first version of the Sikh scripture and placed a copy of the Adi Granth in the gurdwara. He appointed Baba Buddha as the first Granthi.

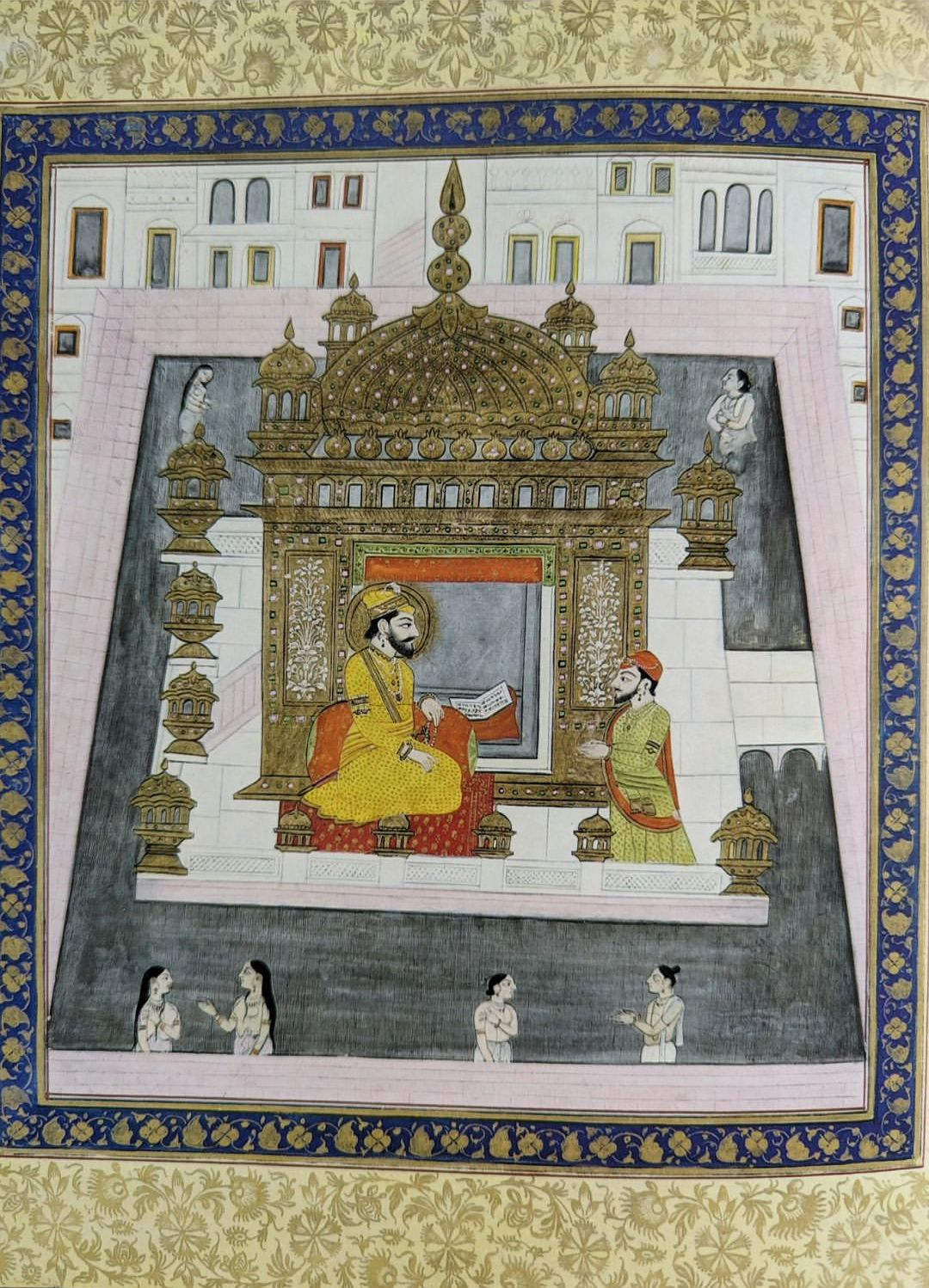
A Sikh guru (perhaps Guru Arjan) seated in the Golden Temple at Amritsar in the late 16th or early 17th century, c. 1830 Guler painting

Ath Sath Tirath ("shrine of 68 pilgrimages"), is a raised canopy on the parkarma (circumambulation marble path around the pool). The name, as stated by W. Owen Cole and other scholars, reflects the belief that visiting this temple is equivalent to 68 Hindu pilgrimage sites in the Indian subcontinent, or that a Tirath to the Golden Temple has the efficacy of all 68 Tiraths combined. The completion of the first version of the Golden Temple was a major milestone for Sikhism, states Arvind-Pal Singh Mandair, because it provided a central pilgrimage place and a rallying point for the Sikh community, set within a hub of trade and activity.

=== Mughal Empire era destruction and rebuilding ===
The growing influence and success of Guru Arjan drew the attention of the Mughal Empire. Guru Arjan was arrested under the orders of the Mughal Emperor Jahangir and asked to convert to Islam. He refused, was tortured and executed in 1606. Arjan's son and successor Guru Hargobind fought a Battle at Amritsar and later left Amritsar and its surrounding areas in 1635 for Kiratpur. For about a century after the Golden Temple was occupied by the Minas. In the 18th century, Guru Gobind Singh after creating the Khalsa sent Bhai Mani Singh to take back the temple. After the death of Mughal emperor Farrukhsiyar in 1719, anti-Sikh persecution decreased in intensity and the Sikhs began congregating at Amritsar again periodically.

The Golden Temple was viewed by the Mughal rulers and Afghan Sultans as the centre of Sikh faith and it remained the main target of persecution. After the original temple was destroyed by hostile forces, the shrine was reconstructed in 1764 (a date which H.H. Cole affirms in his monograph on the temple), however most of the elaborate decorations and additions were added to the shrine in the early 19th century. However, according to Giani Gian Singh's Tawarikh Sri Amritsar (1889), a slightly later date of 1776 is given for the construction of the temple tank (sarovar), the temple edifice proper, the causeway, and the entry gateway or archway (Darshani Deori). Another source states that the principal shrine itself (sanctum sanctorum) was reconstructed in 1765 by Jassa Singh Ahluwalia, the Darshani Deori (main entrance pathway) was built in 1776, while the parkarma (encircling walkway) was finished in 1784.

The Golden Temple was the centre of historic events in Sikh history:

- In 1709, the governor of the Subah of Lahore deployed his army to suppress and prevent the Sikhs from gathering for their festivals of Vaisakhi and Diwali. The Sikhs defied by gathering in the Golden Temple. In 1716, Banda Singh and numerous Sikhs were arrested and executed.
- In 1737, the Mughal governor of Lahore Zakariya Khan Bahadur ordered the capture of the custodian of the Golden Temple named Mani Singh and had him executed. Zakriya Khan appointed Masse Khan as the police commissioner, who then occupied the Temple and converted it into his entertainment centre with dancing girls. He befouled the pool. Sikhs avenged the sacrilege of the Golden Temple by assassinating Masse Khan inside the Temple in August 1740.
- In 1746 Lakhpat Rai, the Dewan of Lahore under Zakriya Khan's successor Yahya Khan, had the pool filled with sand as an act of revenge for the death of his brother Jaspat Rai. In 1749, Sikhs restored the pool when the Mughal governor Moin-ul-Mulk slackened Mughal operations against Sikhs and sought their help during his operations in Multan.
- In 1757, the Afghan ruler Ahmad Shah Durrani, also known as Ahmad Shah Abdali, attacked Amritsar and desecrated the Golden Temple. He had waste poured into the pool along with entrails of slaughtered cows, before departing for Afghanistan. The Sikhs restored it again.
- In 1762, Ahmad Shah Durrani returned and had the Golden Temple blown up with gunpowder. Sikhs returned and celebrated Diwali in its ruins. In 1764, Jassa Singh Ahluwalia collected donations to rebuild the Golden Temple. A new main gateway (Darshan Deorhi), causeway and sanctum were completed in 1776, while the floor around the pool was completed in 1784. The Sikhs also completed a canal to bring in fresh water from the Ravi River for the pool.
- The Golden Temple was attacked by Afghan forces under Ahmed Shah Durrani on 1 December 1764. Baba Gurbaksh Singh along with 29 other Sikhs led a last stand against the much larger Afghan forces and were killed in the skirmish. Abdali then destroyed the Golden Temple for the 3rd time.

=== Ranjit Singh era reconstruction ===
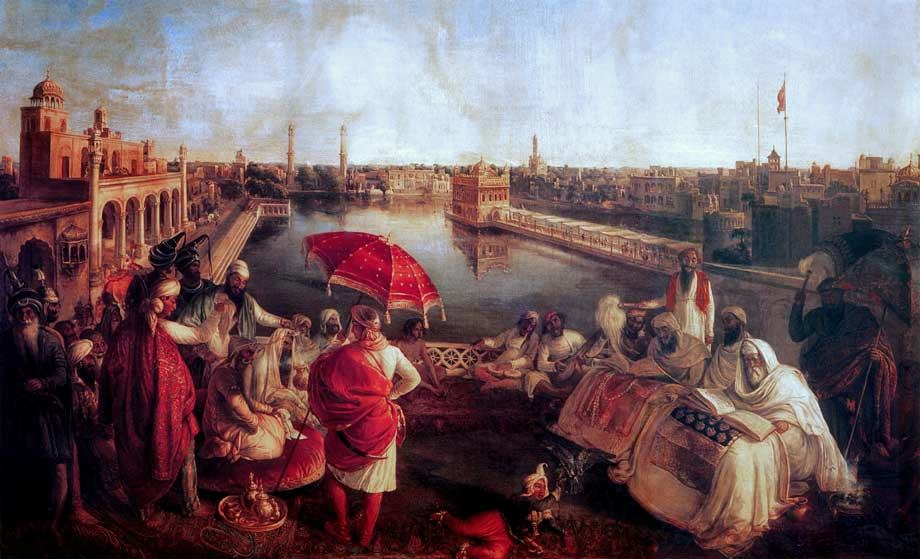
Maharaja Ranjit Singh listening to Guru Granth Sahib being recited near the Akal Takht and Golden Temple, Amritsar, Punjab, India.

Ranjit Singh founded the nucleus of the Sikh Empire at the age of 36 with help of Sukerchakia Misl forces he inherited and those of his mother-in-law Rani Sada Kaur. In 1802, at age 22, he took Amritsar from the Bhangi misl, paid homage at the Golden Temple and announced that he would renovate and rebuild it with marble and gold. The Sikh ruler donated the gilded copper panels for the roof, worth 500,000 rupees in the erstwhile currency. He entrusted Mistri Yar Muhammad Khan to carry-out the roofing work, who himself was supervised by Bhai Sand Singh. The first gilded copper panel was placed on the shrine in 1803.

Various personalities helped decorate and embellish the ceiling of the first floor, with names of some contributors to the cause being Tara Singh Gheba, Partap Singh, Jodh Singh, and Ganda Singh Peshawari. Ganda Singh Peshawari sent his donation in the year 1823. For the decoration and gilding with copper of the main entryway and archway to the causeway leading to the temple proper, known as the Darshani Deori, the prime personality who helped assist with this work was Raja Sangat Singh of Jind State. Due to the central and paramount importance of the shrine in Sikhism, essentially every Sikh sardar of the era had contributed or donated in some manner to assist with the architectural and artistic renovations of the shrine. Owing to the large number of people helping with the renovation work back then, it is difficult to account for when certain parts of the temple were constructed or decorated and by whom (aside from instances where the work has a date inscribed to it) and a chronological record of how the temple evolved over time (in-regards to its murals, decorations, and other aspects) is near-impossible to complete.

The Temple was renovated in marble and copper in 1809, and in 1830 Ranjit Singh donated gold to overlay the sanctum with gold leaf. There is an inscription on embossed metal located at the entrance to the temple proper which commemorates the renovations of the temple undertaken by Ranjit Singh and done through Giani Sant Singh, of the Giani Samparda.

"The Great Guru in His wisdom looked upon Maharaja Ranjit Singh as his chief servitor and Sikh and, in his benevolence, bestowed on him the privilege of serving the temple."

— English translation of a Gurmukhi inscription on embossed metal located at the entrance way to the temple, translated in 'Punjab Art and Culture' (1988), page 59, by Kanwarjit Singh Kang

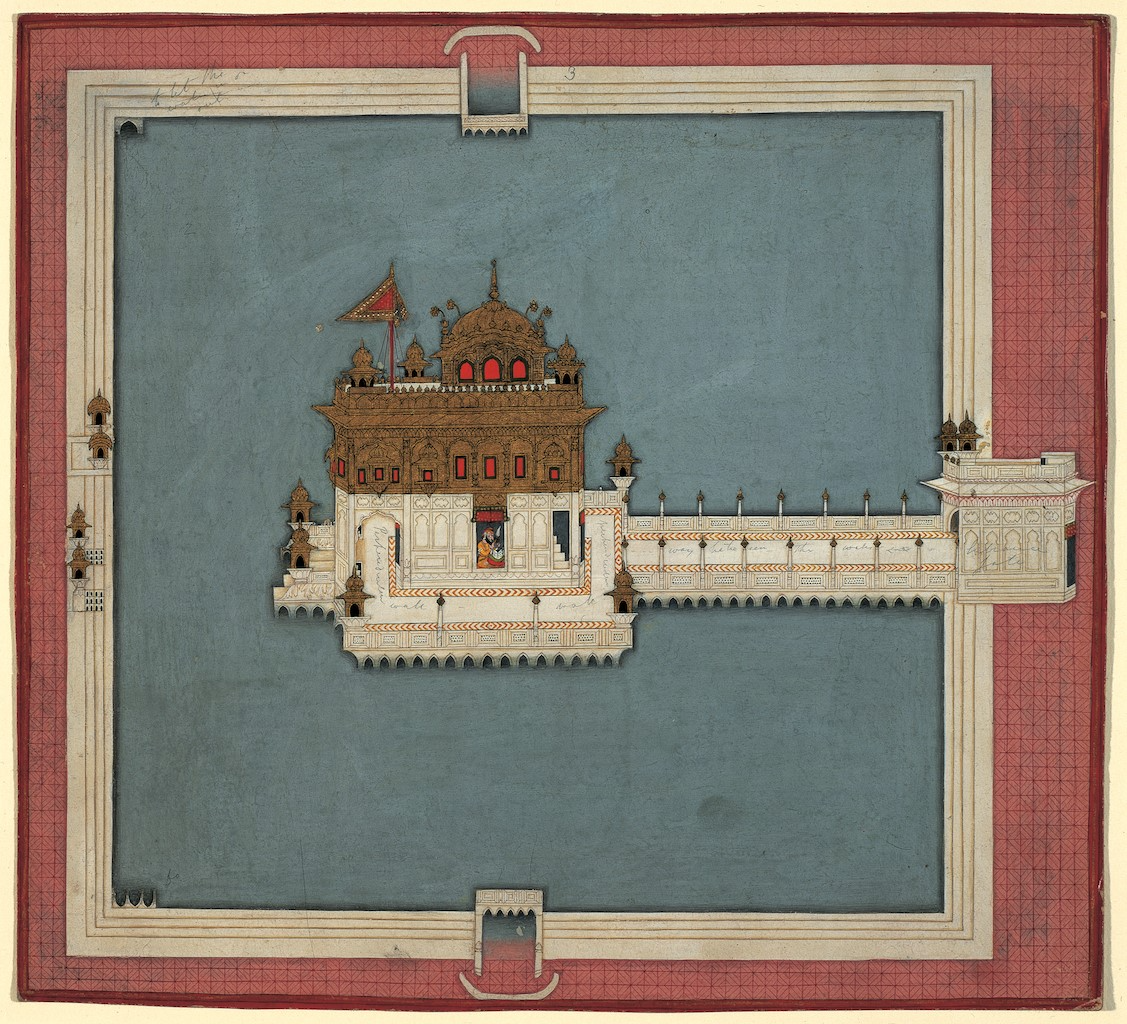
The Golden Temple, Amritsar, c. 1840

After learning of the gurdwara through Ranjit Singh, the 7th Nizam of Hyderabad, Mir Osman Ali Khan started giving yearly grants towards it. The management and operation of Durbar Sahib – a term that refers to the entire Golden Temple complex of buildings, was taken over by Ranjit Singh. He appointed Sardar Desa Singh Majithia (1768–1832) to manage it and made land grants whose collected revenue was assigned to pay for the Temple's maintenance and operation. Hari Singh Nalwa, a general of Maharaja Ranjit Singh, decorated the Akal Takht with gold and is responsible for adding the golden dome at the top of the edifice.

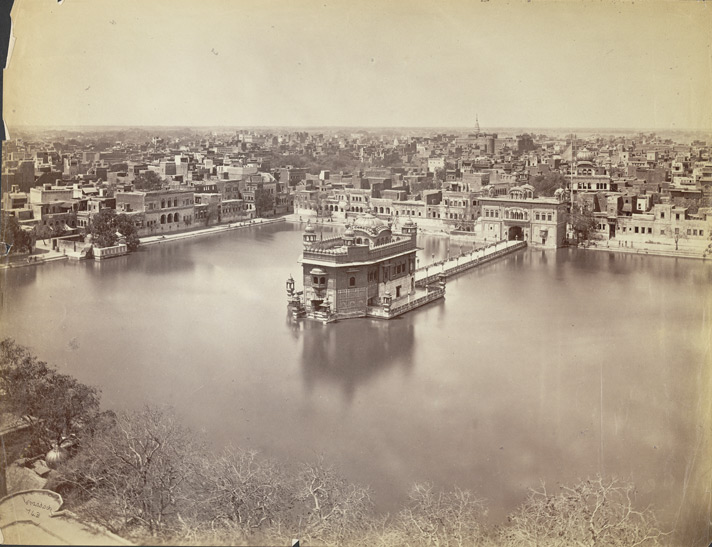
An 1880 photograph of the Golden Temple, the sarovar (sacred pool) and the nearby buildings. The walled courtyard and entrances were added later.

Ranjit Singh also made the position of Temple officials hereditary. The Giani family was the only family allowed to do Katha in the Golden Temple, they served the Sikh community till 1921, when the Shiromani Gurdwara Parbandhak Committee came into power, they were the only family allowed to do Katha since 1788 and were also he heads of the Giani Samparda, they had built all the Bungas around the Golden Temple and helped in construction work including overlaying the temple with Gold and Marble. One of the main Bungas that was destroyed in 1988 was the Burj Gianian. The other family were the Kapurs, who were made as the Head Granthis, this included the ancestors of Bhai Jawahir Singh Kapur who also did try to become the Head Granthi in the late 1800s, but was not allowed (his father Bhai Atma Singh, grandfather Bhai Mohar Singh and their ancestors were also Head Granthis).

=== Colonial period ===
Between 1862–74, a Gothic clock tower was erected near the complex by the British administrators, however the structure was unpopular with the Sikhs and was eventually demolished in late 1945. On 30 April 1877, it is claimed in a popular folk-legend that the shrine was planned to be auctioned by the British but the appearance of ball lightning within the precincts of the shrine complex during amritvela that was witnessed by 400 Sikhs ended the plan. This event is believed by Sikhs to be a miracle attributed to Guru Ram Das to end the auction while the British thought the ball lightning's appearance was a good omen for the rule of Queen Victoria.

=== Post-independence ===
==== Destruction and reconstruction after Indian independence ====
The destruction of the temple complex occurred during Operation Blue Star. It was the codename of an Indian military action carried out between 1 and 8 June 1984 to remove militant Sikh Jarnail Singh Bhindranwale and his followers from the buildings of the Golden Temple complex. The decision to launch the attack rested with Prime Minister Indira Gandhi. In July 1982, Harchand Singh Longowal, the President of the Sikh political party Akali Dal, had invited Bhindranwale to take up residence in the Golden Temple Complex to evade arrest. The government claimed Bhindranwale later made the sacred temple complex an armoury and headquarters.

On 1 June 1984, after negotiations with the militants failed, Indira Gandhi ordered the army to launch Operation Blue Star, simultaneously attacking scores of gurudwaras across Punjab. A variety of army units and paramilitary forces surrounded the Golden Temple complex on 3 June 1984. The fighting started on 5 June with skirmishes and the battle went on for three days, ending on 8 June. A clean-up operation codenamed Operation Woodrose was also initiated throughout Punjab.

The army had underestimated the firepower possessed by the militants, whose armament included Chinese-made rocket-propelled grenade launchers with armour piercing capabilities. Tanks and heavy artillery were used to attack the militants, who responded with anti-tank and machine-gun fire from the heavily fortified Akal Takht. After a 24-hour firefight, the army gained control of the temple complex. Casualty figures for the army were 83 dead and 249 injured. According to the official estimates, 1,592 militants were apprehended and there were 493 combined militant and civilian casualties. According to the government claims, high civilian casualties were attributed to militants using pilgrims trapped inside the temple as human shields.

Brahma Chellaney, the Associated Press's South Asia correspondent, was the only foreign reporter who managed to stay on in Amritsar despite the media blackout. His dispatches, filed by telex, provided the first non-governmental news reports on the bloody operation in Amritsar. His first dispatch, which appeared on the front pages of The New York Times, The Times and The Guardian, reported a death toll about twice of what authorities had admitted. According to the dispatch, about 780 militants and civilians and 400 troops had perished in fierce gun-battles. Chellaney reported that about "eight to ten" men suspected of being Sikh militants had been shot with their hands tied. In that dispatch, Chellaney recounted an interview with a doctor who said he had been picked up by the army and forced to conduct postmortems despite the fact he had never done any postmortem examination before. In reaction to the dispatch, the Indian government charged Chellaney with violating Punjab press censorship, two counts of fanning sectarian hatred and trouble, and later with sedition, calling his report baseless and disputing his casualty figures.

The military action in the temple complex was criticised by Sikhs worldwide, who interpreted it as an assault on the Sikh religion. Many Sikh soldiers deserted their units; several Sikhs resigned from civil administrative office and returned awards received from the Indian government. Four months after the operation, on 31 October 1984, Indira Gandhi was assassinated in an act of revenge by her two Sikh bodyguards, Satwant Singh and Beant Singh. Public outcry over Gandhi's death led to the killings of more than 3,000 Sikhs in Delhi alone in the ensuing 1984 anti-Sikh riots. A few months after the government operation of 1984, major kar seva renovations were undertaken at the shrine complex, including a complete draining and then cleaning of the temple tank (sarovar) by volunteers.

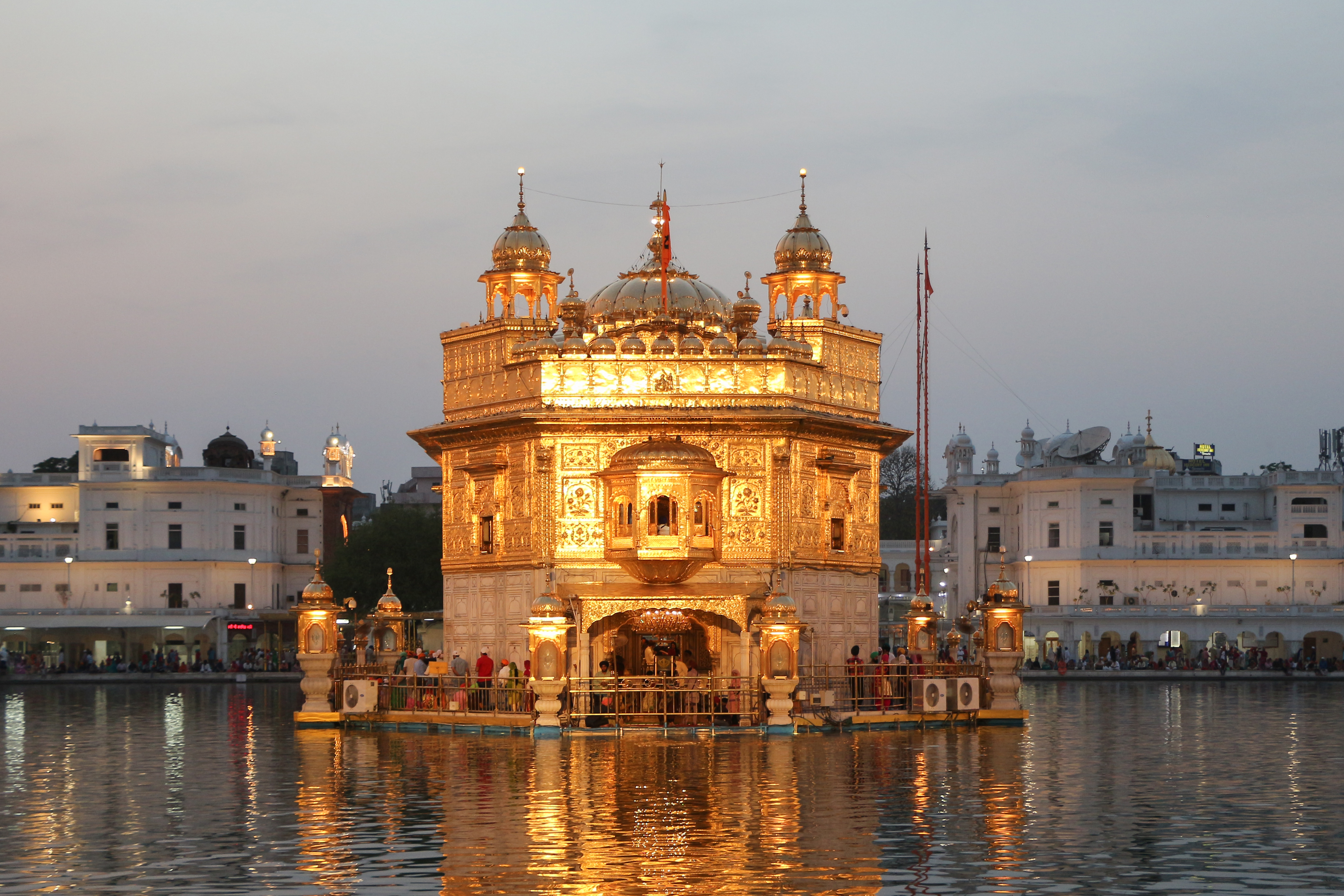
The Golden Temple at twilight

Following the operation the central government demolished hundreds of houses and created an open area around the compound called "Galliara" (also spelled Galiara or Galyara) for security reasons. This was made into a public park and opened in June 1988.

==== Recent ====
In December 2021, a young man was allegedly beaten to death after disrupting the Rehras Sahib (evening prayer) at the sanctum of the temple. He reportedly jumped over a railing and picked up the sword lying before the temple's copy of the Guru Granth Sahib, before attempting to touch the Guru Granth Sahib itself. He was subsequently overpowered by the pilgrims and received fatal injuries to the head.

The 2023 Golden Temple blasts occurred on 7 May and 9 May 2023.

== Architecture ==
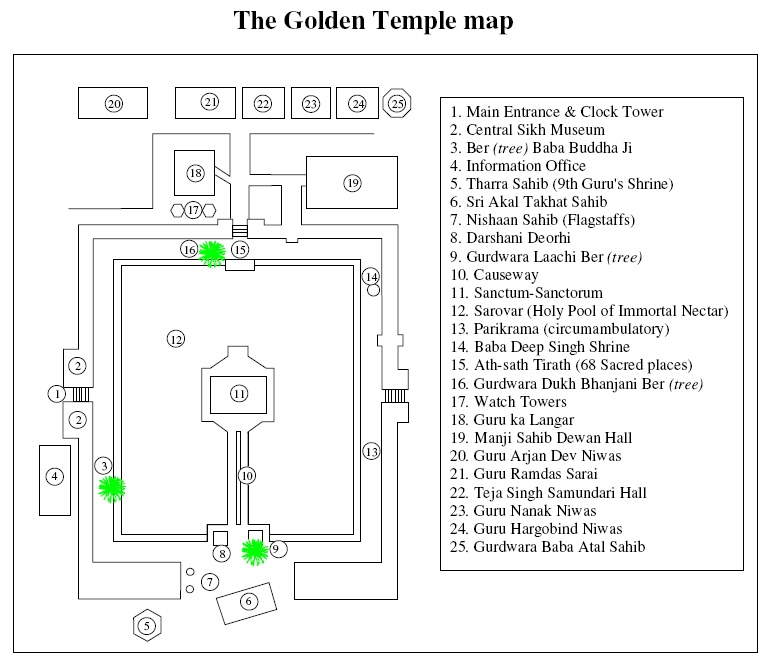
The Golden temple complex map

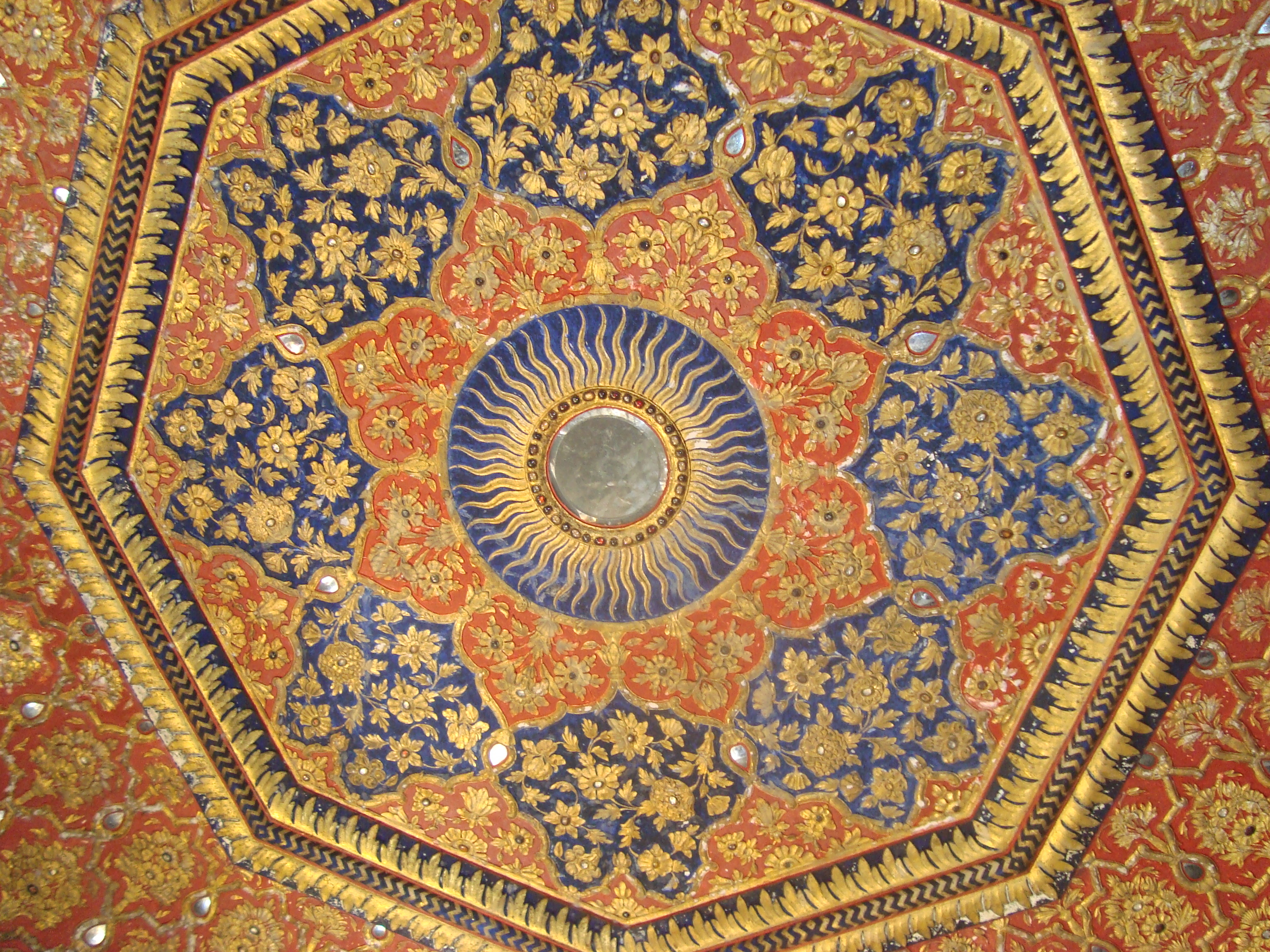
The ceiling of Harmandir Sahib is made with gold and precious stones.

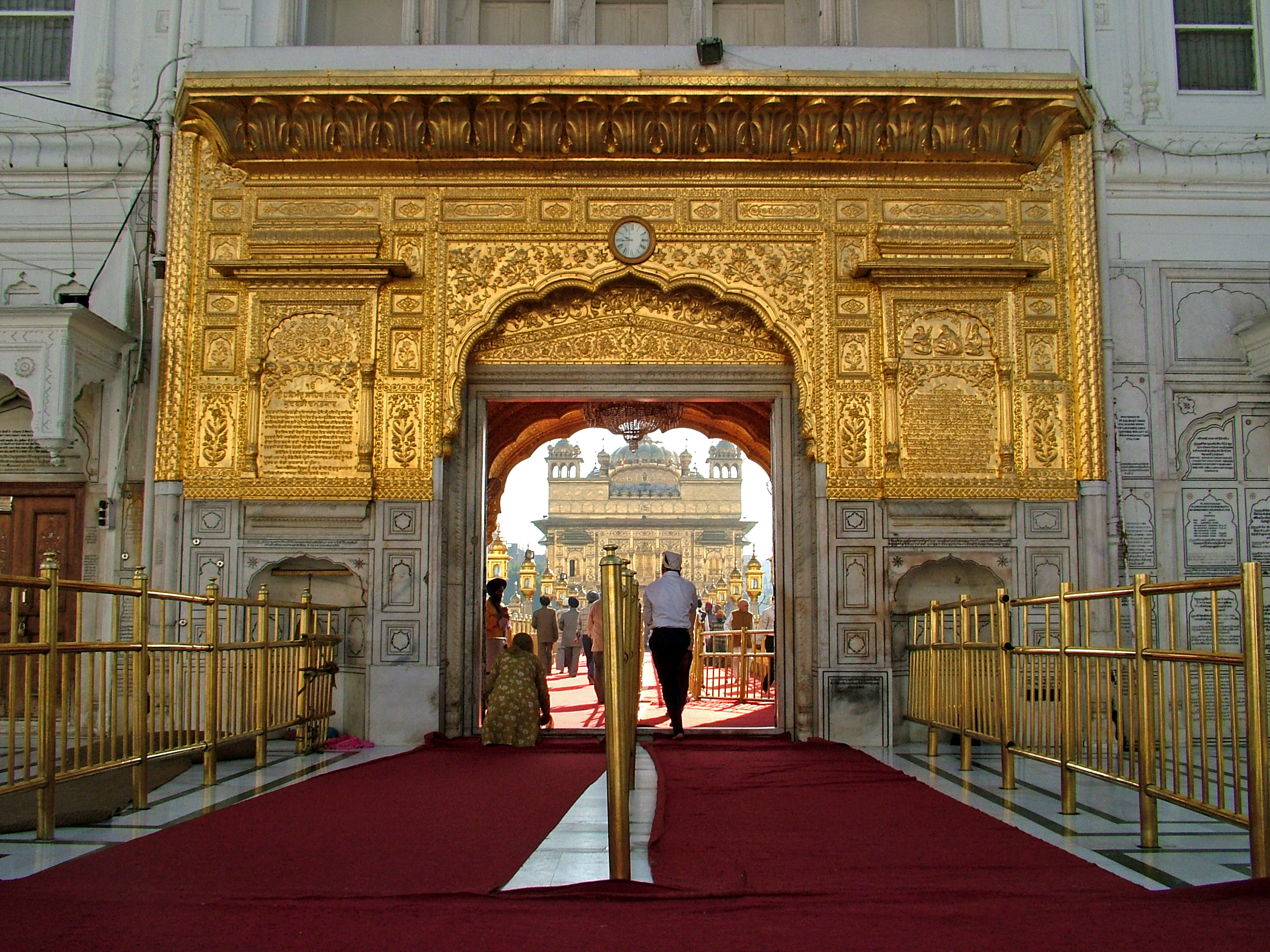
The Darshani Deorhi Arch, entrance to the Harmandir Sahib complex

=== Original structure ===
The Golden Temple's architecture reflects different architectural practices prevalent in the Indian subcontinent, as various iterations of temple were rebuilt and restored. It bears both Hindu and Islamic architectural influences. However, unique architectural aspects of the time it was originally erected include it being accessed via descending rather than ascending and the central scripture being enthroned within the temple proper (sanctum sanctorum), that is open to all with no restrictions.

The first structure of the Harmandir Sahib constructed under the purview of Guru Arjan combined the concepts of dharamsaals and the holy water tanks (sarovar). Rather than copying the traditional method of Hindu temple construction by building the shrine on a high plinth, Guru Arjan rather decided to build the shrine lower than the surroundings so that devotees would have to walk downwards to reach it. The four entrances represented that the Sikh faith was equally open to all four of the traditional Indian caste classifications (varnas).

No surviving account, depiction, or record is extant or known of the proto-type, pre-1764 Harmandir Sahib that was built by the Sikh gurus themselves. However, Kanwarjit Singh Kang believes the original, Guru-constructed structure was mostly comparable and similar to the present-day structure said to have been constructed in 1764. Meanwhile, other writers believe the current, rebuilt structure must bear little in similarity with the original shrine constructed by the Sikh gurus and only indirect references to its function exist in surviving literature.

=== Rebuilt structure ===
The most unique aspect of its later architecture is the gold plating, consisting of a 400 kilogram gold dome and 750 kilograms of gold on the upper level, with the gilding being first added under renovations by Ranjit Singh, who also added marble flooring. Some sections of the gold are inscribed, usually with gurbani verses.

James Fergusson considered the Golden Temple as a specimen of one of the forms that the architecture of Hindu temples developed into in the 19th century. When a list of structures of interest was prepared and published by the colonial government of Punjab in 1875, it was claimed that the architectural design of the Golden Temple, in the form it was constructed as by Ranjit Singh, was based ultimately on the shrine of the Sufi saint Mian Mir. Louis Rousselet stated in 1882 that the shrine was a "handsome style of Jat architecture." Major Henry Hardy Cole described the architecture of the edifice as being primarily drawn from Islamic sources with a significant input from Hindu styles. Percy Brown also classified the temple as being a synthesis of Islamic and Hindu architectural styles, but also observed that the structure has its own unique characteristics and inventions. Hermann Goetz believed that the temple's architecture was a "Kangra transformation of Oudh architecture" that the Sikhs adopted for their own constructions, which he praises, however he also critiqued the temple for having "gaudy" elements commonly found in Indian gurdwaras, an example being the rococo-styled art. The Temple is described by Ian Kerr, and other scholars, as a mixture of the Indo-Islamic Mughal and the Hindu Rajput architecture.

The sanctum sanctorum is located in the middle of a temple-tank. The sanctum is a 12.25 x 12.25 metre square with two storeys and a gold leaf dome. This sanctum has a marble platform that is a 19.7 x 19.7 metre square. It sits inside an almost square (154.5 x 148.5 m^{2}) pool called amritsar or amritsarovar (amrit means nectar, sar is short form of sarovar and means pool). The pool is 5.1 metres deep and is surrounded by a 3.7 metre wide circumambulatory marble passage that is circled clockwise. The sanctum is connected to the platform by a causeway and the gateway into the causeway is called the Darshani Ḍeorhi (from Darshana Dvara). For those who wish to take a dip in the pool, the temple provides a half hexagonal shelter and holy steps to Har ki Pauri. Bathing in the pool is believed by many Sikhs to have restorative powers, purifying one's karma. Some carry bottles of the pool water home particularly for sick friends and relatives. The pool is maintained by volunteers who perform kar seva (community service) by draining and desilting it periodically. Alternative measures for the pool's diameter is 158.50 x 159.30 m^{2} with a parallelogram shape, angled at 86 and 94 degrees. The principal shrine is accessed via a causeway (decorated with lanterns, balustrades, and marble latticework and columns, with an entrance archway) located on the northwestern side of the tank.

There is a section of the shrine known as the Har-Ki-Pauri, located on the backside of the temple proper, where pilgrims and worshippers can take a sip of the water from the holy temple tank. The water used for the daily ritual cleaning of the temple premises is also sourced from this section. The water is mixed with milk to dilute the milk content, with the combined solution used to clean the temple's surfaces on a daily basis.

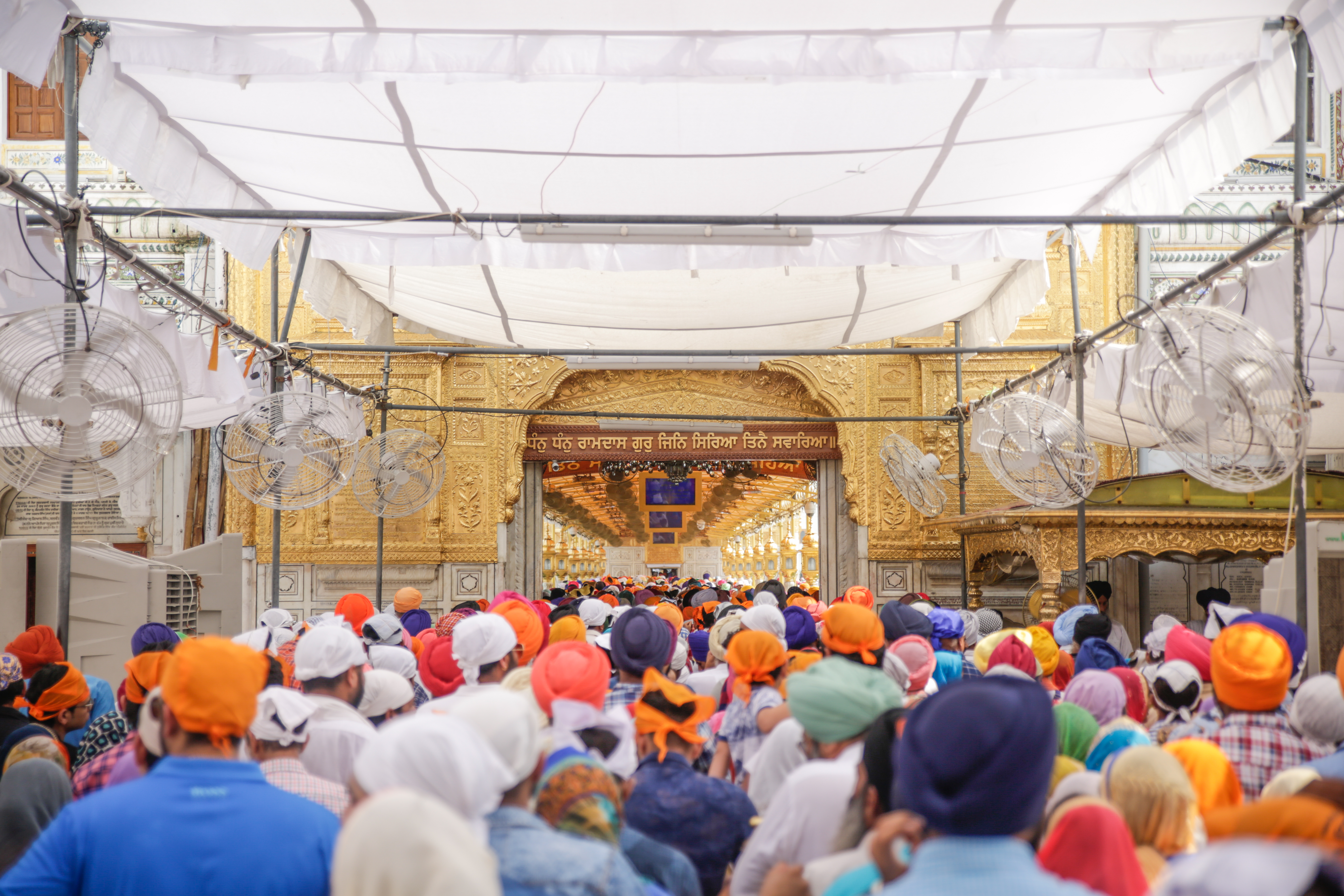
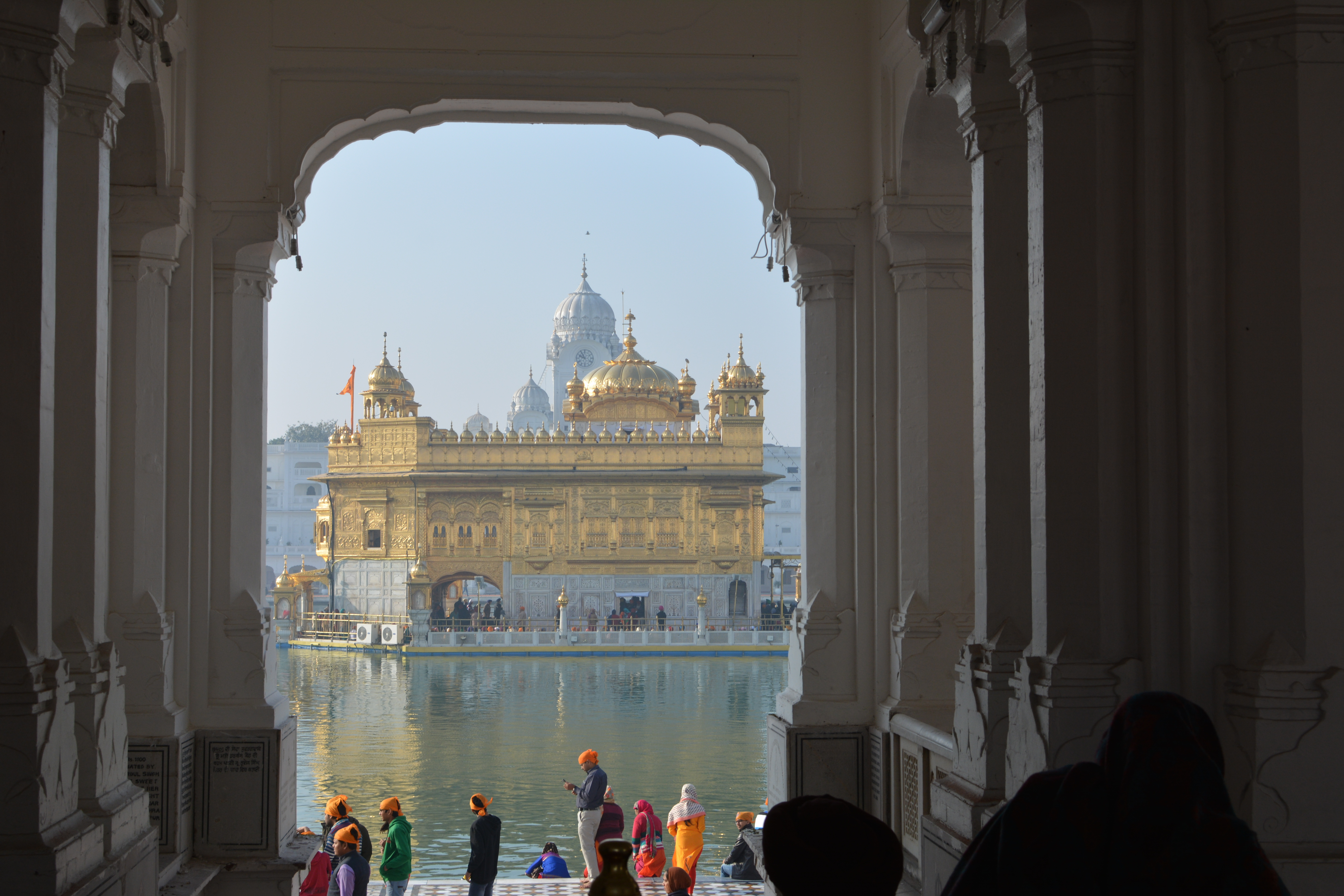
Left: Causeway to the sanctum with people, behind the pool is Ath Sath Tirath; Right: Entrance view

The main building has two main aspects: the Prakash Asthan, a central area where the Guru Granth Sahib is installed and the second aspect is the enclosing chamber that surrounds it. A section built on top of the Prakash Asthan is the Sheesh Mahal. The three levels of the principal shrine symbolise the three aspects of the divine representing the Unvierse found in the Mul Mantar, namely Urdham for above, Adham for below, and Madham for in-between. The sanctum has two floors (or one and a half floors), which is not in agreement with traditional Hindu temple architectural practices. The Sikh scripture Guru Granth Sahib is seated on the lower square floor for about 20 hours every day, and for 4 hours it is taken to its bedroom inside Akal Takht with elaborate ceremonies in a palki, for sukhasana and Prakash. The floor with the seated scripture is raised a few steps above the entrance causeway level. The upper floor in the sanctum is a gallery and connected by stairs. The ground floor is lined with white marble, as is the path surrounding the sanctum. The sanctum's exterior has gilded copper plates. The doors are gold leaf-covered copper sheets with nature motifs such as birds and flowers. The ceiling of the upper floor is gilded, embossed and decorated with jewels. The sanctum dome is semi-spherical with a pinnacle ornament. The sides are embellished with arched copings and small solid domes, the corners adorning cupolas, all of which are covered with gold leaf-covered gilded copper. There is a pavilion located on the second-floor called the Shish Mahal (mirror room).

The floral designs on the marble panels of the walls around the sanctum are Arabesque. The arches include verses from the Sikh scripture in gold letters. The frescoes follow the Indian tradition and include animal, bird and nature motifs rather than being purely geometrical. The stair walls have murals of Sikh Gurus such as the falcon carrying Guru Gobind Singh riding a horse.

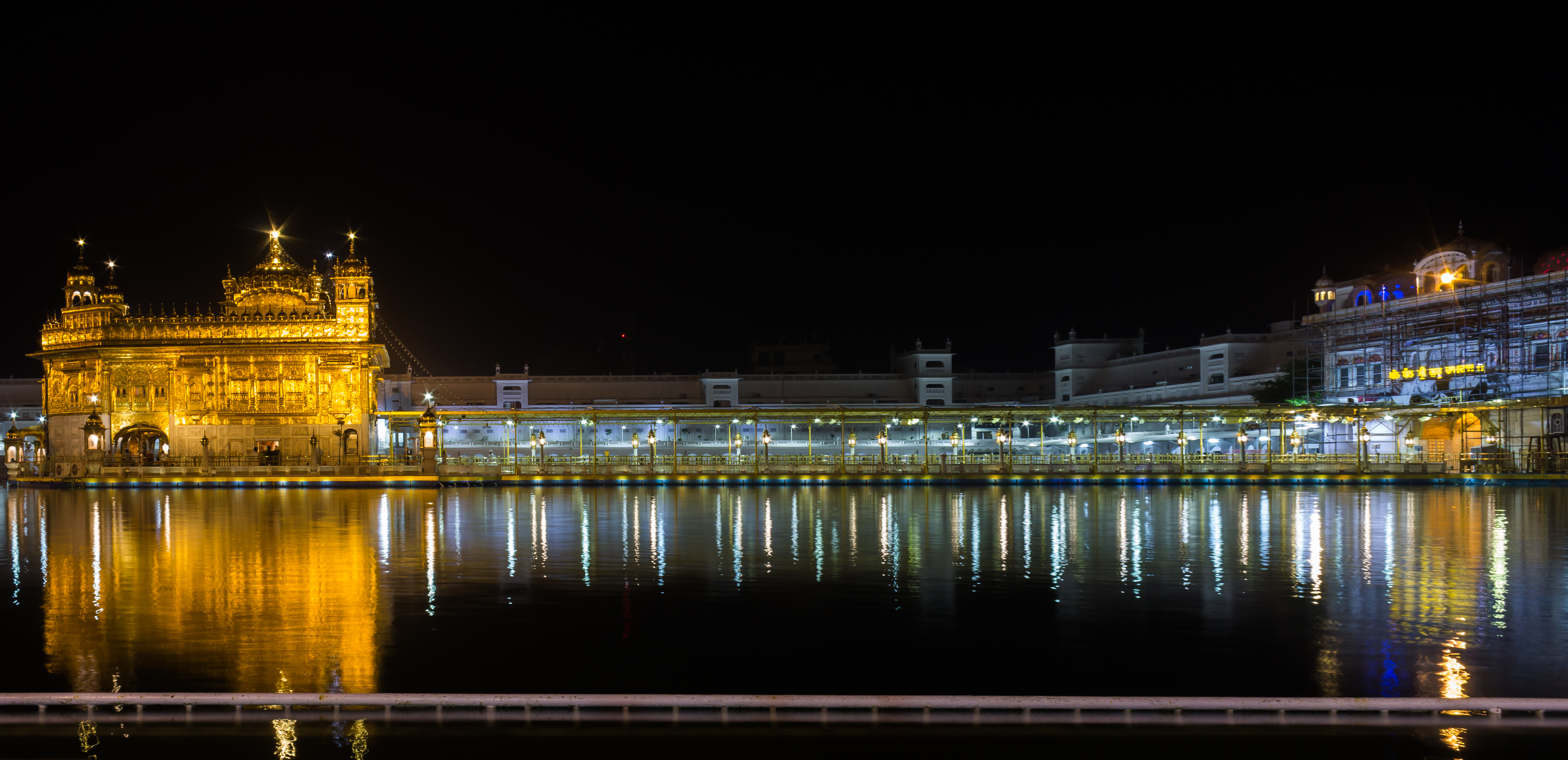
Side view of the causeway leading from the Darshani Deorhi (right) to the sanctum (left)

The Darshani Deorhi is a two-storey structure that houses the temple management offices and treasury. At the exit of the path leading away from the sanctum is the Prasada facility, where volunteers serve a flour-based sweet offering called Karah prasad. Typically, the pilgrims to the Golden Temple enter and make a clockwise circumambulation around the pool before entering the sanctum. There are four entrances to the gurdwara complex signifying the openness to all sides, but a single entrance to the sanctum of the temple through a causeway.

== Auxiliary sites ==
=== Akal Takht ===
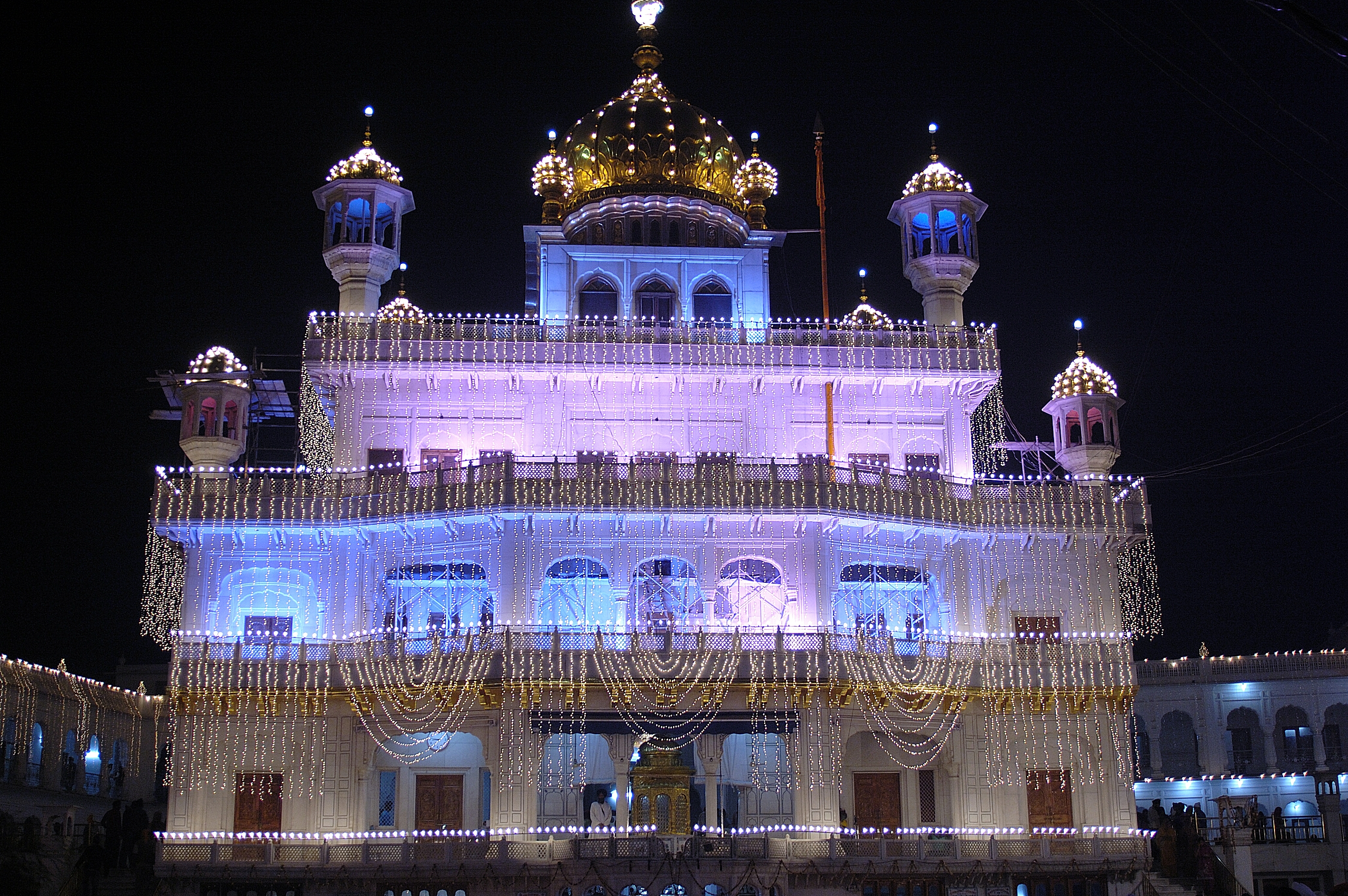
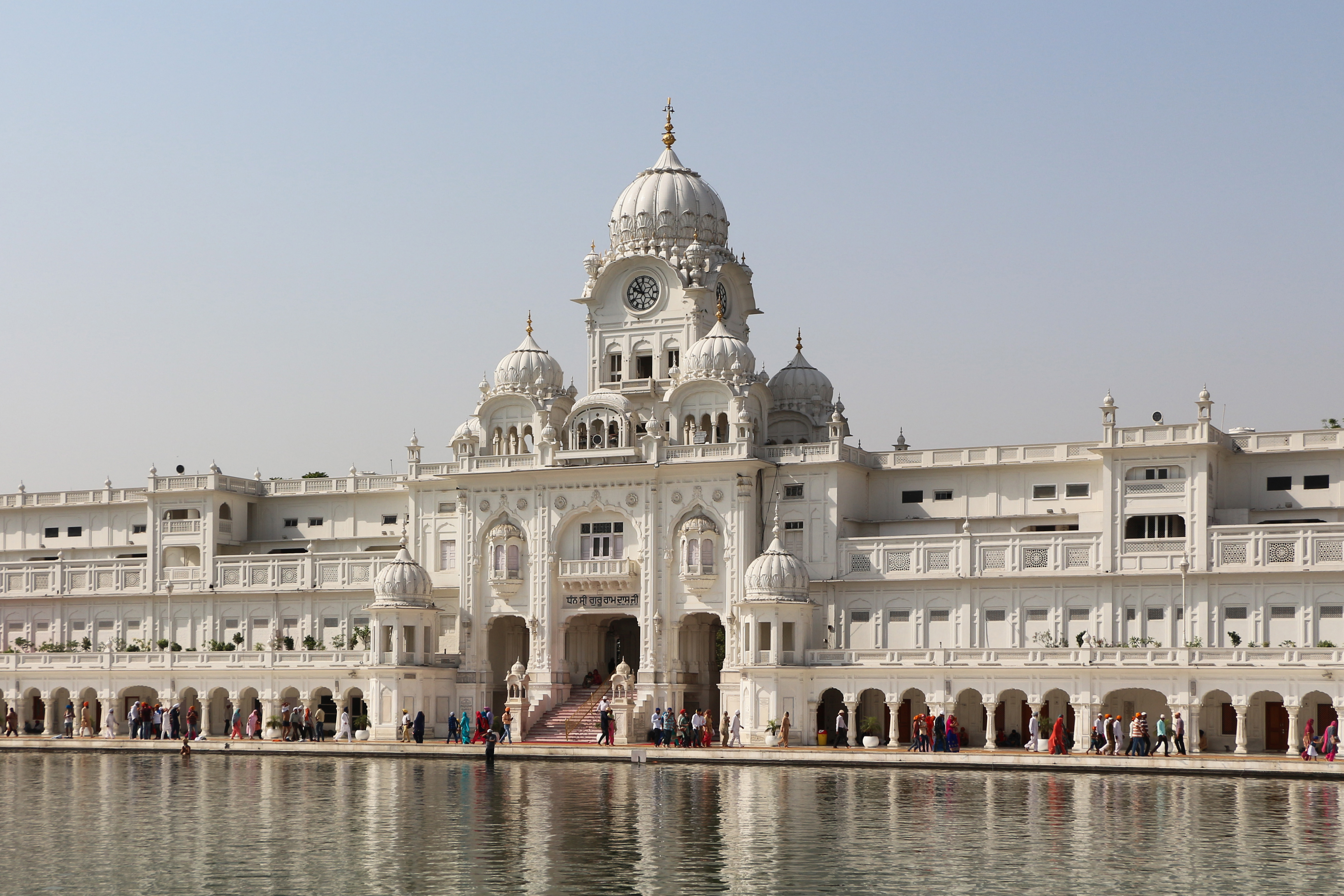
Left: Akal Takht illuminated; Right: One of the entrance gates

In front of the sanctum and the causeway is the Akal Takht building. It is the chief Takht, a centre of authority in Sikhism. Its name Akal Takht means "throne of the Timeless (God)". The institution was established by Guru Hargobind after the martyrdom of his father Guru Arjan, as a place to conduct ceremonial, spiritual and secular affairs, issuing binding writs on Sikh gurdwaras far from his own location. A building was later constructed over the Takht founded by Guru Hargobind, and this came to be known as Akal Bunga. The Akal Takht is also known as Takht Sri Akal Bunga. The Sikh tradition has five Takhts, all of which are major pilgrimage sites in Sikhism. These are in Anandpur, Patna, Nanded, Talwandi Sabo and Amritsar. The Akal Takht in the Golden Temple complex is the primary seat and chief. It is also the headquarters of the main political party of the Indian state of Punjab, Shiromani Akali Dal (Supreme Akali Party). The Akal Takht issues edicts or writs (hukam) on matters related to Sikhism and the solidarity of the Sikh community.

=== Teja Singh Samundri Hall ===
The Teja Singh Samundri Hall is the office of the Shiromani Gurdwara Parbandhak Committee (Supreme Committee of Temple Management). It is located in a building near the Langar-kitchen and Assembly Hall. This office coordinates and oversees the operations of major Sikh temples.

=== Ramgarhia Bunga ===
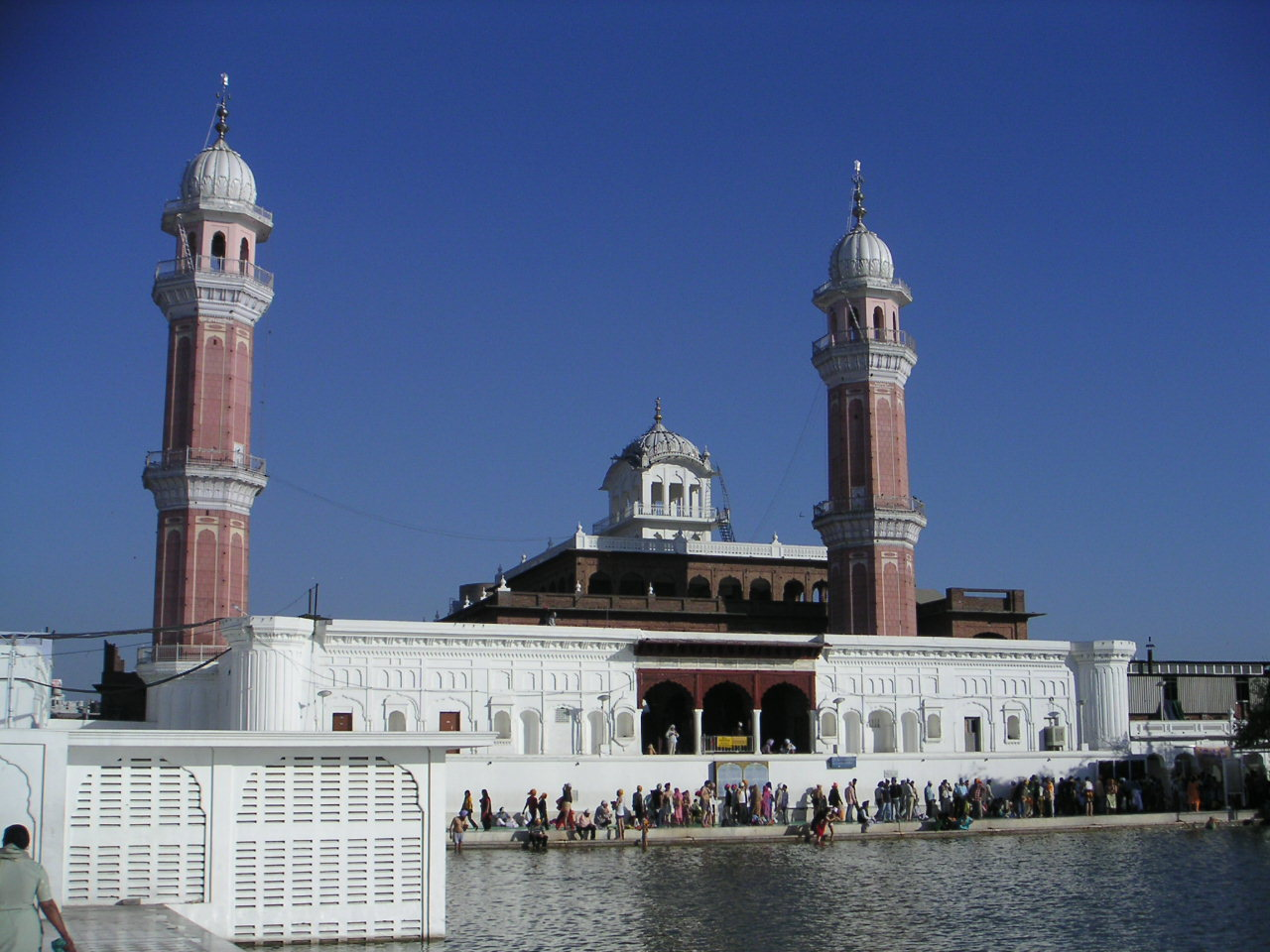
Ramgarhia Bunga watchtowers to protect the Golden temple

The Ramgarhia Bunga – the two high towers visible from the parikrama (circumambulation) walkway around the tank, is named after a Sikh subgroup. The red sandstone minaret-style Bunga (buêgā) towers were built in the 18th century, a period of Afghan attacks and temple demolitions. It is named after the Sikh warrior and Ramgarhia misl chief Jassa Singh Ramgarhia. It was constructed as the temple watchtowers for sentinels to watch for any military raid approaching the temple and the surrounding area, help rapidly gather a defence to protect the Golden Temple complex. According to Fenech and McLeod, during the 18th century, Sikh misl chiefs and rich communities built over 70 such Bungas of different shapes and forms around the temple to watch the area, house soldiers and defend the temple. These served defensive purposes, provided accommodation for Sikh pilgrims and served as centres of learning in the 19th century. Most of the Bungas were demolished during the British colonial era. The Ramgarhia Bunga remains a symbol of the Ramgarhia Sikh community's identity, their historic sacrifices and contribution to defending the Golden Temple over the centuries.

=== Clock tower ===
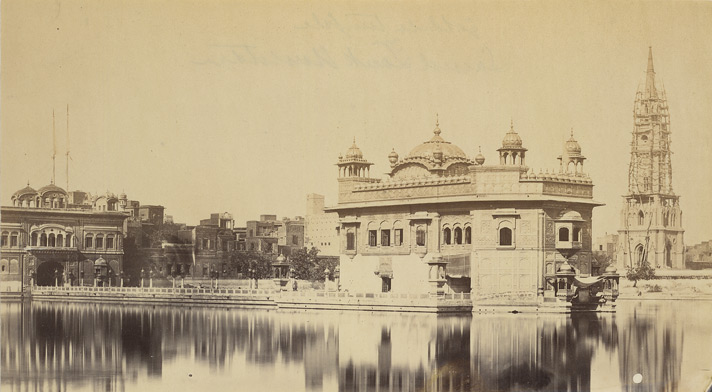
An 1860s photo of the Golden Temple during the colonial British era with the under-construction Gothic clock tower (which was later demolished) on extreme right-side.

The Clock Tower did not exist in the original version of the temple. In its location was a building, now called the "lost palace". The officials of the British India wanted to demolish the building after the Second Anglo-Sikh war and once they had annexed the Sikh Empire. The Sikhs opposed the demolition, but this opposition was ignored. In its place, the clock tower was added. The clock tower was designed by John Gordon in a Gothic cathedral style with red bricks. The clock tower construction started in 1862 and was completed in 1874. The tower was demolished by the Sikh community about 70 years later. In its place, a new entrance was constructed with a design more harmonious with the Temple. This entrance on the north side has a clock, houses a museum on its upper floor, and it continues to be called ghanta ghar deori.

=== Ber trees ===
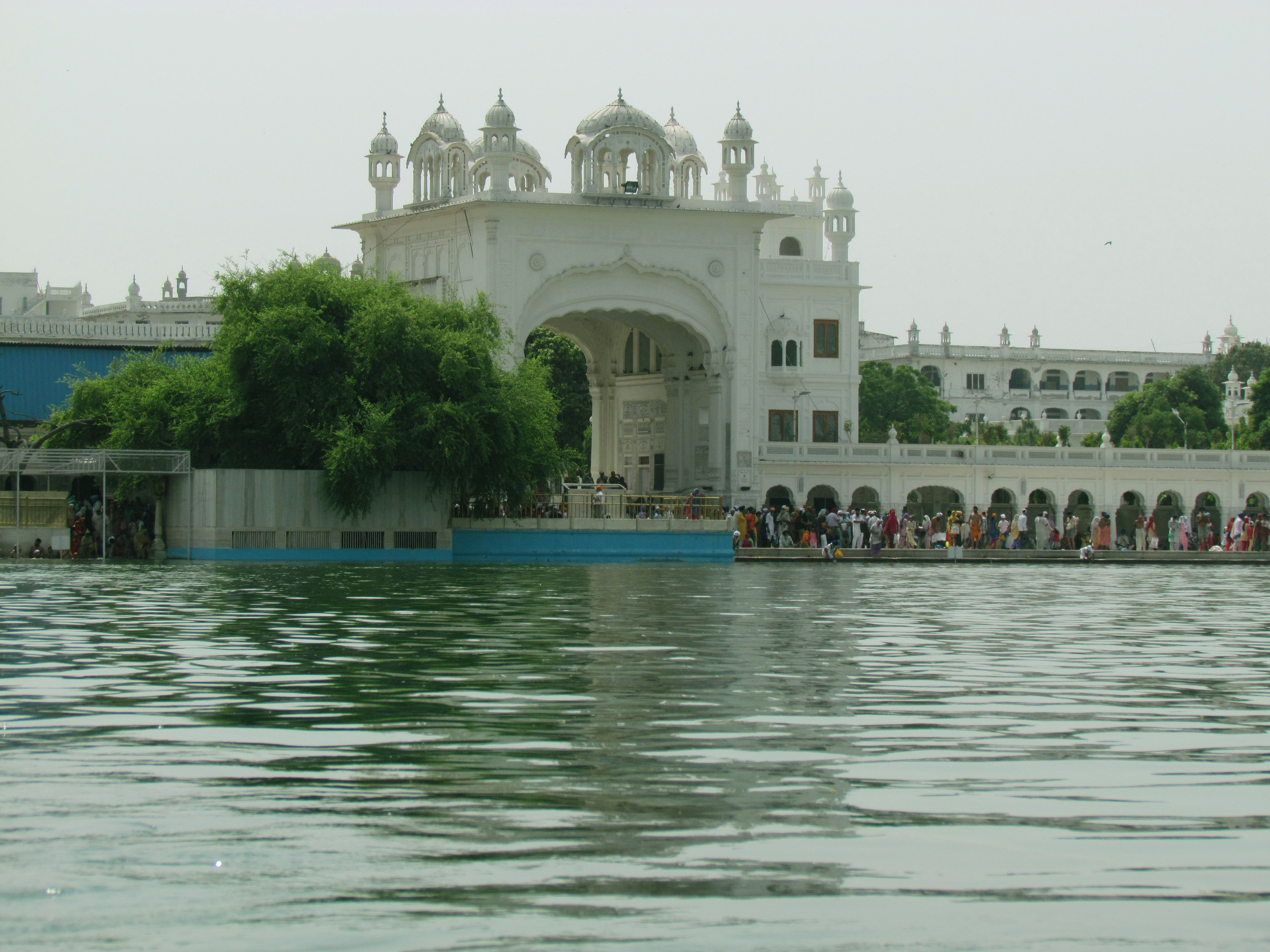
The historic Dukh Bhanjani Ber tree inside the courtyard, next to Ath Sath Tirath.

The Golden Temple complex originally was open and had numerous trees around the pool. It is now a walled, two-storey courtyard with four entrances, that preserve three Ber trees (jujube). One of them is to the right of the main ghanta ghar deori entrance with the clock, and it is called the Ber Baba Buddha. It is believed in the Sikh tradition to be the tree where Baba Buddha sat to supervise the construction of the pool and first temple.

A second tree is called Laachi Ber, believed to the one under which Guru Arjan rested while the temple was being built. The third one is called Dukh Bhanjani Ber, located on the other side of the sanctum, across the pool. It is believed in the Sikh tradition that this tree was the location where a Sikh was cured of his leprosy after taking a dip in the pool, giving the tree the epithet of "suffering remover". There is a small gurdwara underneath the tree. The Ath Sath Tirath, or the spot equivalent to 68 pilgrimages, is in the shade underneath the Dukh Bhanjani Ber tree. Sikh devotees, states Charles Townsend, believe that bathing in the pool near this spot delivers the same fruits as a visit to 68 pilgrimage places in India.

=== Sikh history museums ===
The complex hosts museums. The main ghanta ghari deori north entrance has a Sikh history museum on the first floor, according to the Sikh tradition. The display shows various paintings of gurus and martyrs, many narrating the persecution of Sikhs over their history, and historical items such as swords, kartar, comb, chakkars. A new underground museum near the clock tower, but outside the temple courtyard also shows Sikh history. According to Louis E. Fenech, the display does not present the parallel traditions of Sikhism and is partly ahistorical such as a headless body continuing to fight, but a significant artwork and reflects the general trend in Sikhism of presenting their history to be one of persecution, martyrdoms and bravery in wars.

The main entrance to the gurdwara has many memorial plaques that commemorate past Sikh historical events, saints and martyrs, contributions of Ranjit Singh, as well as commemorative inscriptions of all the Sikh soldiers who died fighting in the two World Wars and the various Indo-Pakistan wars.

=== Amrit Sarovar ===
The Amrit Sarovar (meaning "pool of nectar") is the name of the main temple-tank (sarovar) of the complex. It is a large, rectangular water-tank that measures approximately 150 meters by 150 meters with the principal shrine edifice in the middle of it, with it being surrounded on its sides by the marble walkway of the complex (parikarma). Its construction was first started via digging by Guru Amar Das in November 1573, with the main bulk of the work being attributed to the successor Guru Ram Das, and a later expansion by Guru Arjan. The Udasis of Brahm Buta Akhara also were responsible for digging a hansli (water channel) to feed water into the Amrit Sarovar of the Darbar Sahib complex in 1783. Later, the hansli was made redundant through the construction of a Amritsar-Lahore branch and Kasur-Sabraon branch. Since 1866, the Amrit Sarovar of the Golden Temple complex has been fed water from the Jethuwal distributory of the Upper Bari Doab of the region between the Beas and Ravi, via a connection between the Kaulsar Sarovar and Amrit Sarovar. The canal was originally kachcha but later was lined and covered. Since the 1900s, the sarovar has been regularly, periodically cleaned in the form of communal Kar Seva projects, with the first modern one being held on 17 June 1923. Aside from the Amrit Sarovar, other prominent sarovars of the city of Amritsar are the Santokhsar Sarovar, Ramsar Sarovar, Kaulsar Sarovar, and Bibeksar Sarovar. The waters of the sarovar are believed to have healing properties.

=== Guru Ram Das Langar ===
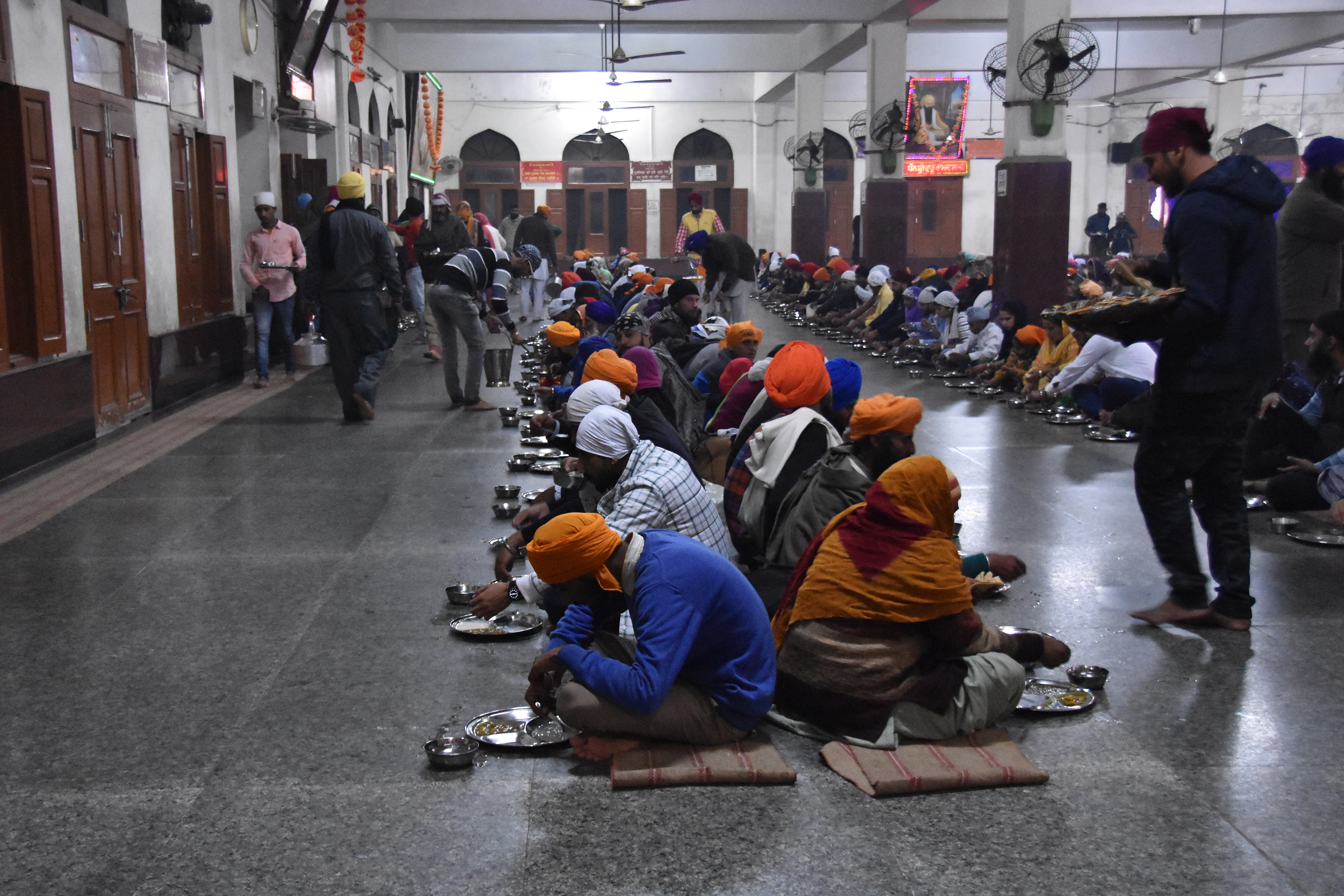
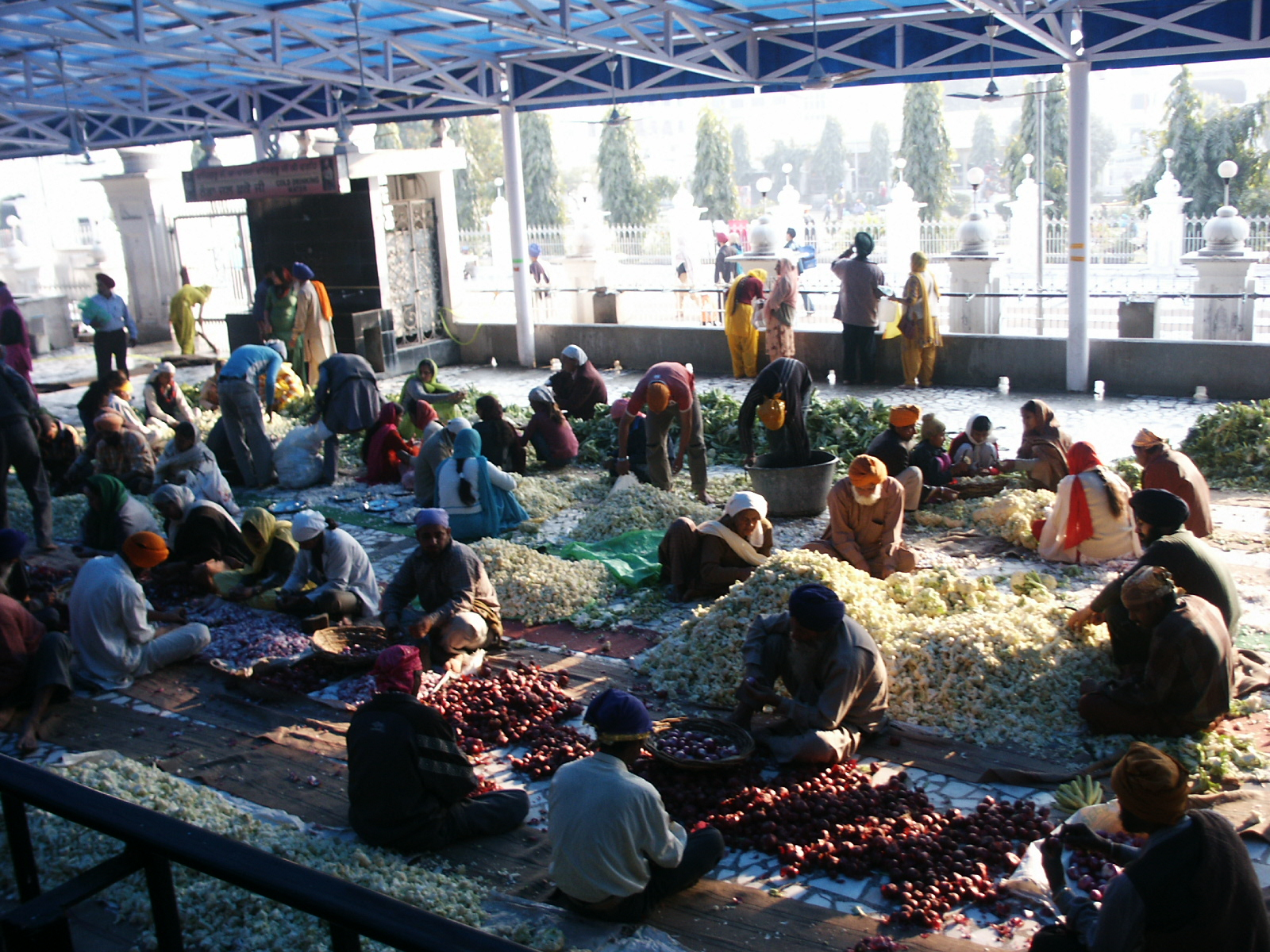
Left: Langar hall from inside, Right: Volunteers helping prepare the food at the langar

Harmandir Sahib complex has a langar, a community-run free kitchen and dining hall. It is attached to the east side of the courtyard near the Dukh Bhanjani Ber, outside of the entrance. Food is served here to all visitors who want it, regardless of faith, gender or economic background. Vegetarian food is served and all people eat together as equals. Everyone sits on the floor in rows, which is called sangat. The meal is served by volunteers as part of their kar seva ethos. Over 100,000 vegetarian meals are served at the langar every day.

== Ceremonies ==
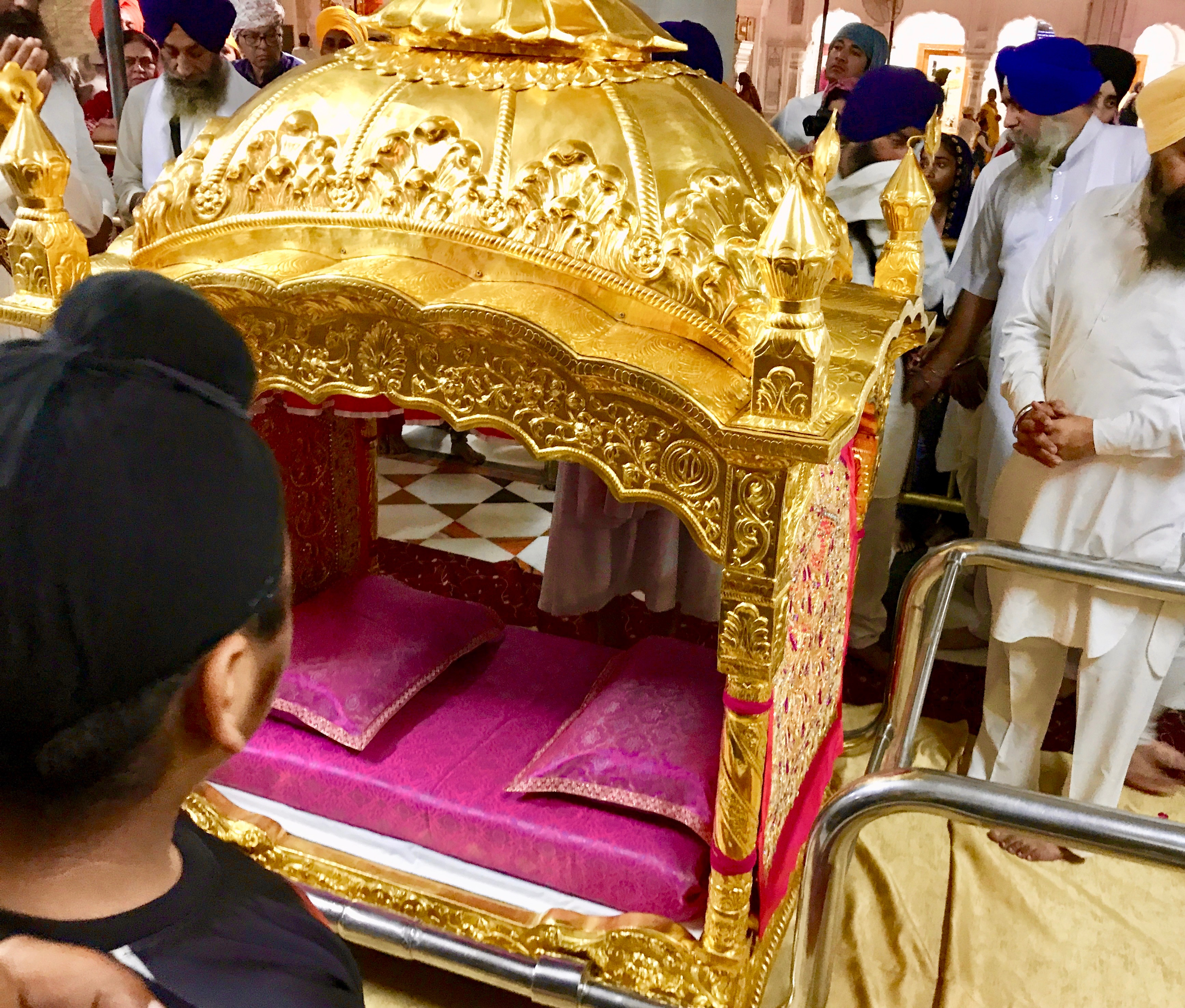
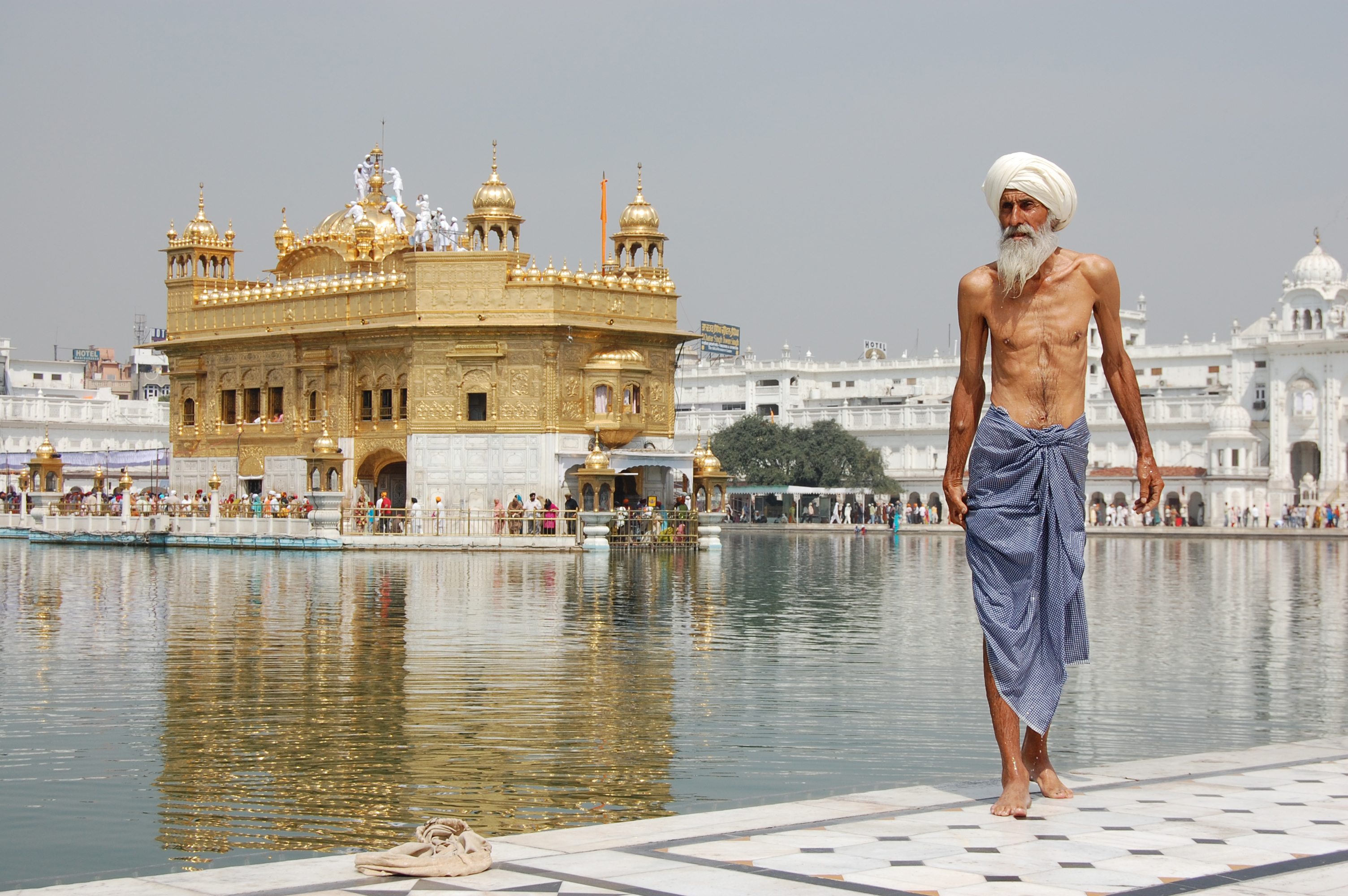
Left: A palanquin being prepared for the daily sukhasan ritual to carry the scripture to a bedroom; Right: A Sikh pilgrim. Some Sikhs take a dip in the pool.

Within the sanctum sanctorum, the only acceptable activities are paying respect to the scripture and praying. There are several rites performed every day in the Golden Temple as per the historic Sikh tradition. These rites treat the scripture as a living person, a Guru out of respect. They include:

- Closing rite called sukhasan (sukh means "comfort or rest", asan means "position"). At night, after a series of devotional kirtans and three part ardās, the Guru Granth Sahib is closed, carried on the head, placed into and then carried in a flower decorated, pillow-bed palki (palanquin), with chanting. Its bedroom is in the Akal Takht, on the first floor. Once it arrives there, the scripture is tucked into a bed.
- Opening rite called prakash which means "light". At about dawn every day, the Guru Granth Sahib is taken out its bedroom, carried on the head, placed and carried in a flower-decorated palki with chanting and bugle sounding across the causeway. It is brought to the sanctum. Then after ritual singing of a series of Var Asa kirtans and ardas, a random page is opened. This is the mukhwak of the day, it is read out loud, and then written out for the pilgrims to read over that day.

Aside from daily events, there are also religious and seasonal observances, such as the gurpurabs of Guru Nanak and Guru Ram Das, the Shaheedi Diwas of Guru Tegh Bahadur, Baisakhi and Diwali, that are celebrated at the site.

== Art ==
Earliest known painting depicting the shrine is a miniature dating to c. 1825 while the first photograph of the shrine was taken in c. 1856. The art of the Golden Temple has rarely been analysed or studied in a serious manner. Within the Shish Mahal on the second-story of the building, there are mirror-work art designs which consist of small pieces of mirror which are inlaid into the walls and ceilings, highlighted with decorations of floral designs. The ceilings, walls and arches of the structure are embellished by intricate mural artwork. The pietra dura (inlaid stone design) artwork of the shrine, which features avian and other animalistic designs using semi-precious stones, was mostly inspired by the Mughal tradition. The temple premises is also decorated with embossed copper, gach, tukri, jaratkari, and ivory inlay artwork. The external portions of the upper story's walls of the temple have been affixed with beaten copper plates that feature raised designs depicting usually florals and abstracts but there are some depictions of human figures as well. An example of embossed metal designs depicting humans are two raised copper panels located on the front-side of the temple prior, the first which depicts Guru Nanak surrounded by his companions, Bhai Mardana and Bhai Bala, on each side. The second embossed panel features an equestrian portrayal of Guru Gobind Singh.

Gach can be described as a kind of stone or gypsum. Gach was transformed into a paste and used on the walls, similar in nature to lime-plaster. Once applied to the wall, it was decorated into shape with steel cutters and other tools. Sometimes the gach had coloured glass pieces placed on it, which is known as tukri. The Shish Mahal features a lot of examples of tukri work. On the other hand, jaratkari was an art form and method which involved placing inlaid and cut stones of varying colours and types into marble. Surviving exemplars of jaratkari art from the temple can be found on the bottom-section of the exterior walls which are encased with marble panels featuring jaratkari artwork. The jaratkari marble panels in this lower exterior section is classified as pietra dura and semi-precious stones, like lapis lazuli and onyx, were utilised. While the Mughals also decorated their edifices using jaratkari and pietra dura art, what sets apart the Sikh form of the art technique from the Mughal one is that the Sikh jaratkari art form also depicts human and animal figuratives with it, something that is not found in Mughal jaratkari art.

Inlaid ivory work can be witnessed on the doors of the Darshani Deori structure of the complex. The structure of the Darshani Deori was made out of shisham wood, the front of the edifice is overlaid with silverwork, including ornamated silver panels. The back of the structure is decorated with panels consisting of floral and geometric designs but also animal figuratives, such as deer, tigers, lions, and birds. Portions of the inlaid ivory had been coloured red or green, an aspect of the artwork that was praised by H.H. Cole for its harmoniousness.

The oldest extant murals in the complex date back to the 1830s. Most of the vast array of murals that once coated the walls of the complex were destroyed in subsequent renovation works conducted under the guise of kar seva, such as by being covered by marble slabs affixed to the walls. A prominent artist who painted many of the murals in the complex was Gian Singh Naqqash. The mural artwork of the temple consists primarily of floral designs with scattered examples of animal designs and themes. There are over 300 different design patterns dispersed all over the walls of the edifice. These wall paintings were created by Naqqashi artists, who had developed their own lingo to differentiate their various themes and designs. The most prominent design category was referred to as Dehin, which is described as "a medium of expression of the imaginative study of the artist's own creation of idealised forms". The base of dehin is known as Gharwanjh. Gharwanjh is a "decorative device involving knotted grapples between animals". The gharwanjh designs of the Golden Temple features cobras, lions, and elephants holding one another or carrying floral vases which feature fruit and fairies as decoration. The decorative border of the dehin is known as Patta, usually utilising creepers for its design. Some feature designs incorporating aquatic creatures.

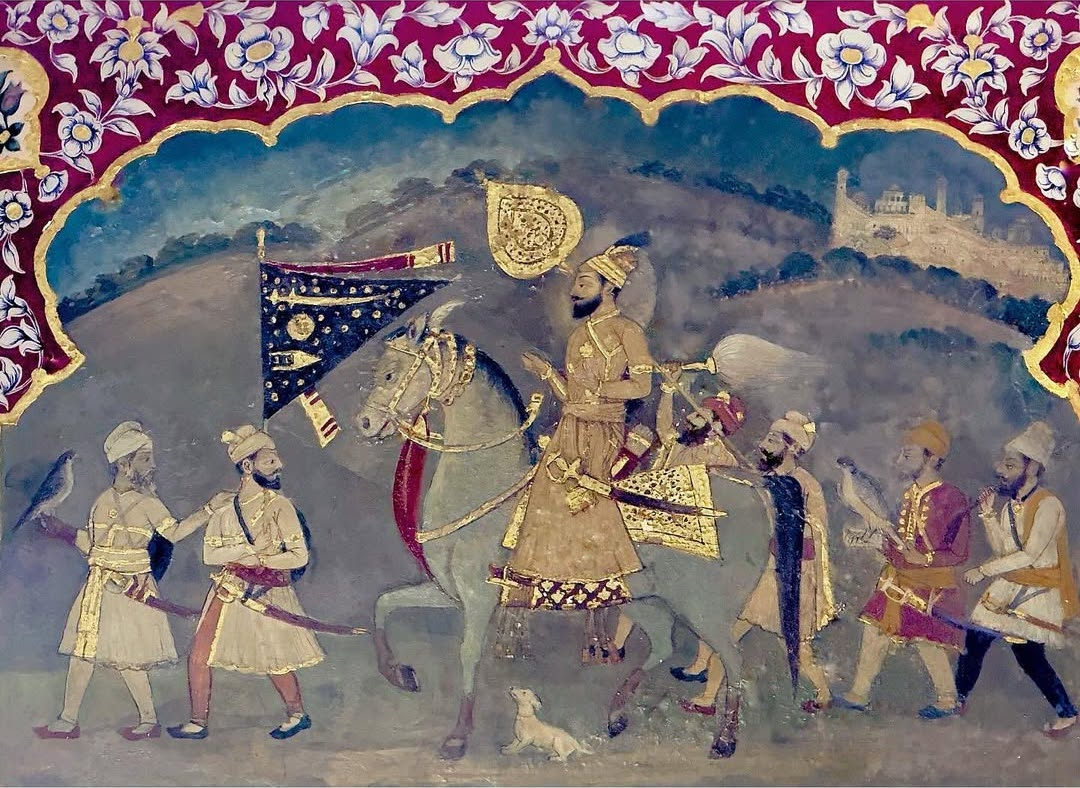
Fresco depicting Guru Gobind Singh on horseback with his retinue leaving Anandpur Fort, Kangra School, from within the Golden Temple shrine, Amritsar, ca.1820's–1830's

The only mural depicting human figures within the temple proper is located on the wall behind the northern narrow staircase leading to the top of the shrine. It depicts Guru Gobind Singh on horseback alongside his retinue leaving the fort of Anandpur - a mural adaptation of what was originally a Kangra miniature painting. When H.H. Cole wrote about the murals of the Golden Temple, he witnessed many murals depicting Indic mythological scenes but these murals have since been lost.

While W. Wakefield had recorded that he observed murals depicting erotic scenes painted on the Golden Temple's walls in a work published in 1875, Kanwarjit Singh Kang finds this to be a spurious account which is likely false because there is no corroborative accounts to support this.

The various artists and craftsmen who worked on creating the mural artwork and other accessory art of the temple are mostly unknown and it is nearly impossible to link any particular art piece with a specific name, aside from a very few. A traditional Sikh artist who had worked at the Golden Temple, named Hari Singh, had prepared a list of all the names of the artists, painters (naqqashis), and craftsmen he could recount that had also worked at some point in time at the Golden Temple, the names are as follows: Kishan Singh, Bishan Singh, Kapur Singh, Kehar Singh, Mahant Ishar Singh, Sardul Singh, Jawahar Singh, Mehtab Singh, Mistri Jaimal Singh, Harnam Singh, Ishar Singh (not to be confused with Mahant Ishar Singh), Gian Singh, Lal Singh Tarn Taran, Mangal Singh, Mistri Narain Singh, Mistri Jit Singh, Atma Singh, Darja Mal, and Vir Singh.

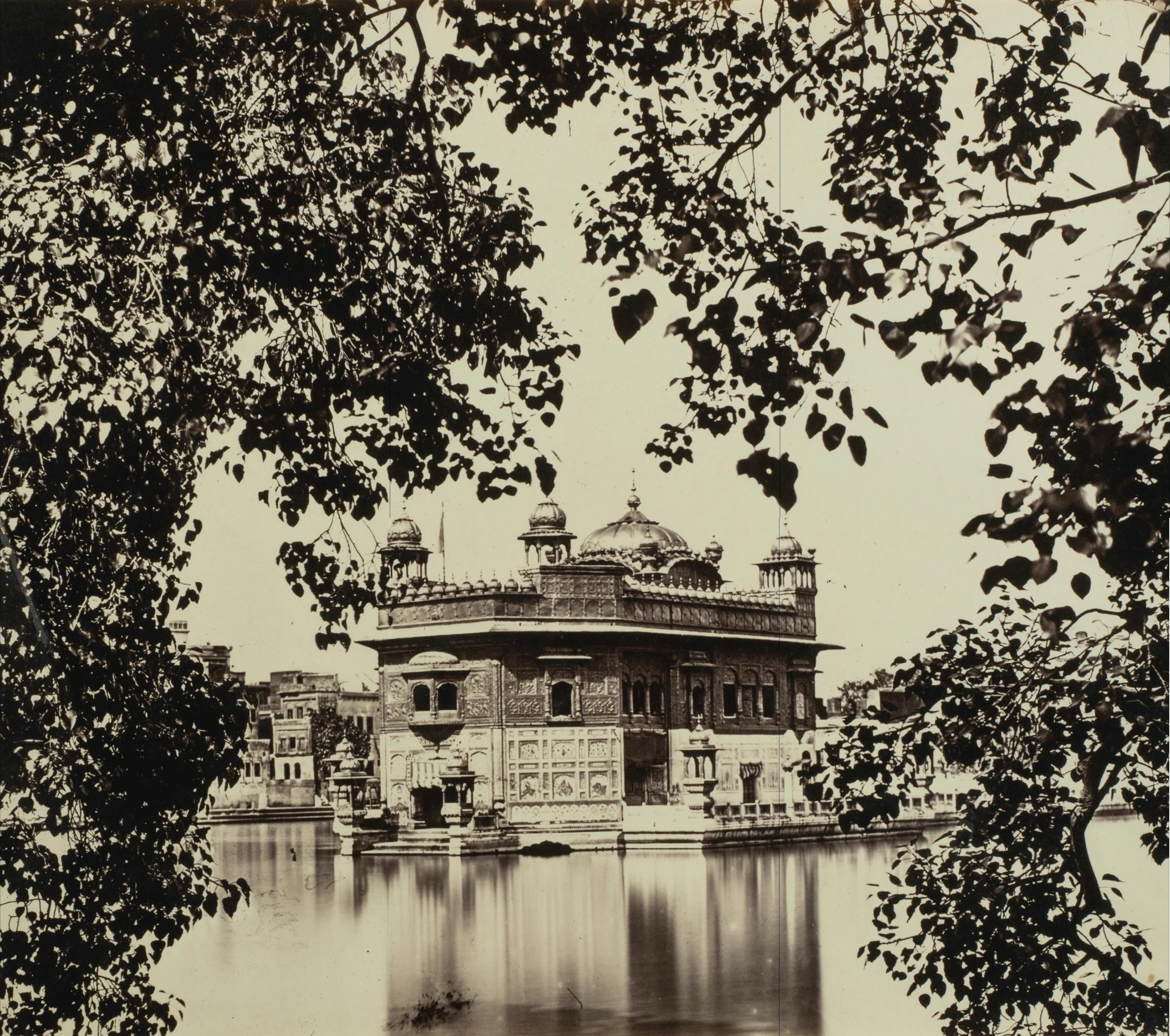
Photograph of the Golden Temple in Amritsar, Punjab, by Felice Beato, circa October 1859. Many frescoes can be seen adorning the exterior wall panels of the central edifice. These murals are no longer extant.

Most of the artwork lost over the years, throughout the various changes and renovations to the temple, were murals. Murals started being lost in the temple around the last years of the 19th century, when devotees were allowed to start donating inlaid marble panels to affix to the walls of the shrine. The walls that were covered by these marble panels usually were painted with murals and thus the murals were either hidden under the marble panels or destroyed. The Golden Temple used to have many traditional buildings, known as bungas, surrounding it. These bungas were a great source and collection of murals and thus their artwork was lost when the vast majority of the bungas were demolished over the years under the guise of modernising the religious site and expanding its parikrama. When the Darshani Deori was covered with marble panels, many wall paintings that had been executed by Mahant Ishar Singh were covered up and lost due to them.

== Influence on contemporary era Sikhism ==
The complex has come to be understood as the headquarters and principal shrine of the Sikh religion. Despite Sikhism officially admonishing the practice of pilgrimage, an exception has been made for the Golden Temple, owing to the practice of singing religious hymns within its premises on a constant basis. It is visited for both sightseeing and religious reasons.

=== Singh Sabha and Akali movements ===
The Singh Sabha movement was a late-19th century movement within the Sikh community to rejuvenate and reform Sikhism at a time when Christian, Hindu and Muslim proselytisers were actively campaigning to convert Sikhs to their religion. The movement was triggered by the conversion of Ranjit Singh's son Duleep Singh and other well-known people to Christianity. Started in 1870s, the Singh Sabha movement's aims were to propagate the true Sikh religion, restore and reform Sikhism to bring back into the Sikh fold the apostates who had left Sikhism. There were three main groups with different viewpoints and approaches, of which the Tat Khalsa group had become dominant by the early 1880s. Before 1905, the Golden Temple had Brahmin priests, idols and images for at least a century, attracting pious Sikhs and Hindus. In 1890s, these idols and practices came under attack from reformist Sikhs. In 1905, with the campaign of the Tat Khalsa, these idols and images were removed from the Golden Temple. The Singh Sabha movement brought the Khalsa back to the fore of gurdwara administration over the mahants (priests) class, who had taken over control of the main gurdwaras and other institutions vacated by the Khalsa in their fight for survival against the Mughals during the 18th century and had been most prominent during the 19th century.

=== Jallianwala Bagh massacre ===
As per tradition, the Sikhs gathered in the Golden Temple to celebrate the festival of Baisakhi in 1919. After their visit, many walked over to the Jallianwala Bagh next to it to listen to speakers protesting the Rowlatt Act and other policies implemented by the British colonial government. A large crowd had gathered, when Colonel Reginald Edward Harry Dyer ordered a detachment of ninety soldiers (drawn from the 9th Gorkha Rifles and the 59th Scinde Rifles) under his command to surround the Jallianwala Bagh, and then open fire into the crowd. 379 were killed and thousands were wounded in the massacre. The massacre strengthened the opposition to colonial rule throughout India, particularly that from Sikhs. It triggered massive non-violent protests. The protests pressured the British colonial government to transfer the control over the management and treasury of the Golden Temple to an elected organisation called Shiromani Gurudwara Prabandhak Committee (SGPC). The SGPC continues to manage the Golden Temple.

=== Punjabi Suba movement ===
The Punjabi Suba movement was a long-drawn political agitation, launched by the Sikhs, demanding the creation of a Punjabi Suba, or Punjabi-speaking state, in the post-independence state of East Punjab. It was first presented as a policy position in April 1948 by the Shiromani Akali Dal, after the States Reorganisation Commission set up after independence was not effective in the north of the country during its work to delineate states on a linguistic basis. The Golden Temple complex was the main centre of operations of the movement, and important events during the movement that occurred at the gurdwara included the 1955 raid by the government to quash the movement, and the subsequent Amritsar Convention in 1955 to convey Sikh sentiments to the central government. The complex was also the site of speeches, demonstrations, and mass arrests, and where leaders of the movement domiciled in huts during hunger strikes. The borders of the modern state of Punjab, along with the official status of the state's native language of Punjabi in the Gurmukhi script, are the result of the movement, which culminated in the setting of the current borders in 1966.

=== Operation Blue Star ===
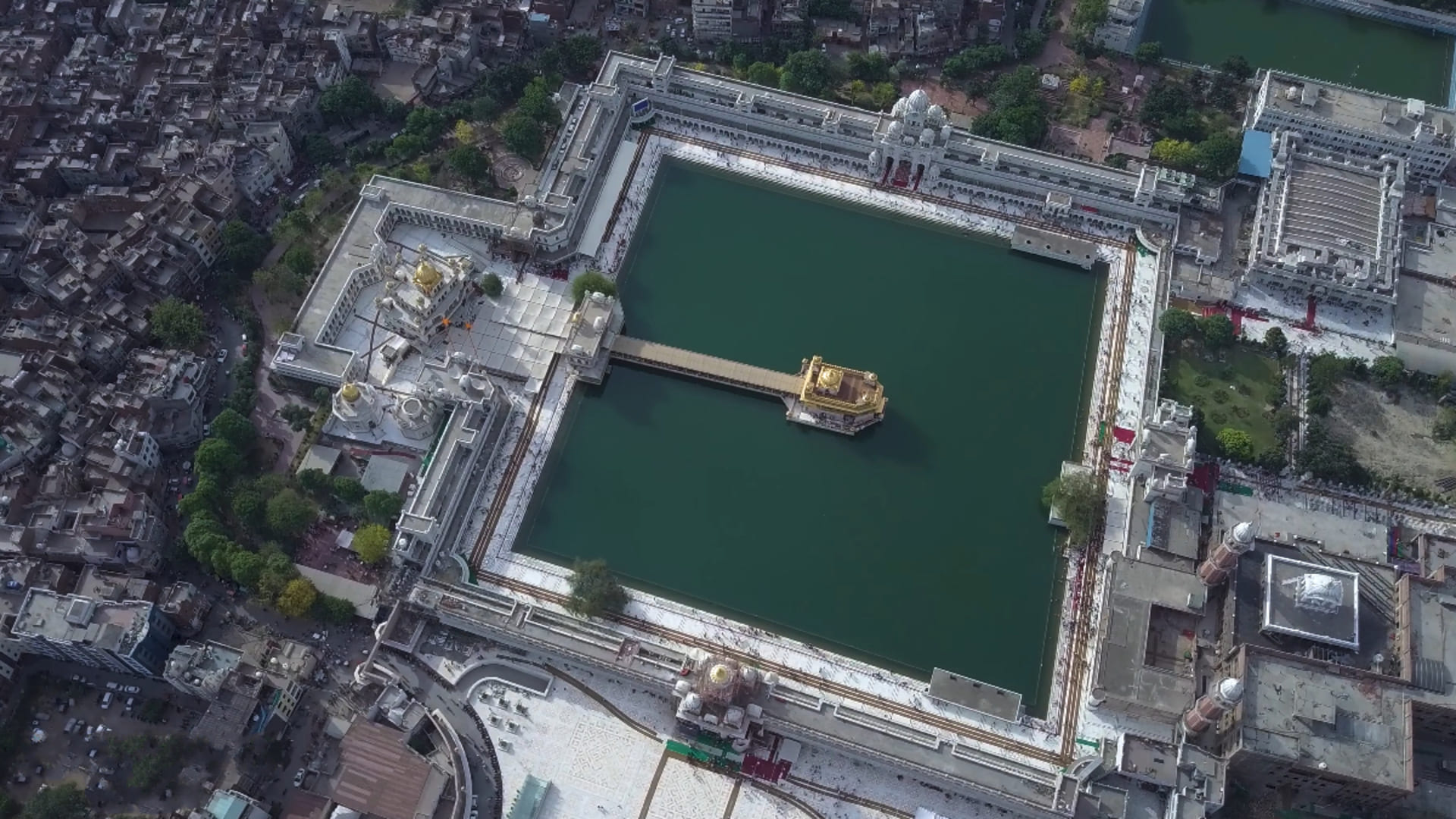
Aerial view of the Galliara park around the complex

The Golden Temple and Akal Takht were occupied by various militant groups in the early 1980s. These included the Dharam Yudh Morcha led by Sikh fundamentalist Jarnail Singh Bhindranwale, the Babbar Khalsa, the AISSF and the National Council of Khalistan. In December 1983, the Sikh political party Akali Dal's President Harchand Singh Longowal had invited Jarnail Singh Bhindranwale to take up residence in Golden Temple Complex. The Bhindranwale-led group under the military leadership of General Shabeg Singh had begun to build bunkers and observations posts in and around the Golden Temple. They organised the armed militants present at the Harmandir Sahib in Amritsar in June 1984. The Golden Temple became a place for weapons training for the militants. Shabeg Singh's military expertise is credited with the creation of effective defences of the Gurdwara Complex that made the possibility of a commando operation on foot impossible. Supporters of this militant movement circulated maps showing parts of northwest India, north Pakistan and eastern Afghanistan as historic and future boundaries of the Khalsa Sikhs, with varying claims in different maps.

In June 1984, Prime Minister Indira Gandhi ordered the Indian Army to begin Operation Blue Star against the militants. The operation caused severe damage and destroyed the Akal Takht. Numerous soldiers, militants and civilians died in the crossfire, with official estimates of death of 492 civilians and 83 Indian army men. Within days of the Operation Bluestar, some 2,000 Sikh soldiers in India mutinied and attempted to reach Amritsar to liberate the Golden Temple. Within six months, on 31 October 1984, Indira Gandhi's Sikh bodyguards assassinated her.

In 1986, Indira Gandhi's son and the next Prime Minister of India Rajiv Gandhi ordered repairs to the Akal Takht Sahib. These repairs were removed and Sikhs rebuilt the Akal Takht Sahib in 1999.

== Administration ==
The early administrative structure of the complex involved four general categories of posts:

- Granthis – responsible for taking care of the Guru Granth Sahib and keeping it in prakash
- Pujaris
- Musicians (ragis and rababis)
- Employees (mulazam)

During the earliest era, the position of head granthi was not a hereditary one but rather based on merit with caste playing no role in the selection. In late August 1604 when the Adi Granth was installed at the complex by Guru Arjan, he appointed Baba Buddha as the first granthi of the site. The Adi Granth at that time was kept at Guru ke Mahal, which was where the Sikh guru resided. During amritvela (early morning), it was brought to the Darbar Sahib proper and installed on a daily basis. After the death of Guru Gobind Singh in 1708, administration over the site was contested over by the two main Sikh factions, the Tatt Khalsa versus the Bandai Khalsa. After 1719, Mata Sundari sent Bhai Mani Singh and six other Sikhs to administer the Darbar Sahib. In 1721, conflict between the Tatt Khalsa and Bandais almost led to violence but Mani Singh brokered a peace between the two sides.

These former practices were followed until c. 1740 CE. Reformations of the site's administration followed in the result of the Persian and Afghan invasions and desecrations of the site. After the reconstruction of the site and reorgnaization of the Khalsa, an Udasi named Baba Gopal Das Udasin was established as both the site's granthi and pujari. However, due to corruption he was removed from the site administration, being succeeded by Bhai Chanchal Singh, who was in turn succeeded by Atma Singh. After Atma Singh, the next granthi Sham Singh introduced additional granthis to assist with the administration of the complex, serving in rotational turns. During the Sikh Empire, Ranjit Singh abolished the system of collective manegement of the site by the sardars of the Sikh Confederacy. He further entrusted general management of the site as the responsibility of Desa Singh Majithia, with his role being inherited by his son Lehna Singh Majithia.

Starting in 1846 after the first Anglo-Sikh war, the British Resident in Lahore began engaging with the management of the complex. The British used the past example of Ranjit Singh's interference in the management of the site to justify their own interventions. While Lehna Singh maintained his post nominally, real power now laid with the British Resident of Lahore. In November 1847, Henry Lawrence signed an order regarding monetary allowances for the site and granted a jagir to one of the granthis of the site, Makhan Singh. In 1848, Lehna Singh Majithia shifted to Benaras and thus the British later appointed a loyalist named Jodh Singh to serve as the temple's manager. The general committee was formed with Raja Teja Singh as president and Jodh Singh both being the extra assistant commissioner (executive officer) and manager (sarbarah). The extra assistant commissioner role oversaw the temple and while the manager had the power to fine and temporarily banish pujaris for wrongdoing, with Jodh Singh having both roles, including financial oversight over the complex. The British after annexing Punjab did not cease state financial support to the religious site, with 4,000 rupees per year being given for maintenance and nearly 30,000 rupees to support granthis, pujaris, rababis, and other employees and auxiliary structures (including the bungas). The British financially supported the site to increase their influence and goodwill amongst the Sikhs for their rule.

In the period after annexation in 1849 until 1859, the Golden Temple complex was managed by a series of mahants under British-control, with this period being described by Ian Kerr as the British government maintaining direct control through proxy of a judicial officer. The Extra-Assistant Commissioner, under the Chief Commissioner of Punjab, held the power to fine persons for misconduct and also the ability to bar their entry into the complex. After the Indian Mutiny, the pujari caretakers of the shrines of the Golden Temple, the Akal Takht, and auxiliary shrines started bickering over management of funds from daily offerings and the Sikh sardars supposed to manage the shrines failed to fulfill their duties. By the end of the 1850s, British direct management over the Sikh site became more controversial after a decree issued by John Lawrence in August 1858 regarding British involvement in native religious sites (limiting them to judicial affairs only and leaving internal management to the religious groups), with Robert Needham Cust (Comissioner of the Amritsar Division) in early 1859 pushing the directive to hold true with regards to the Golden Temple, with his hasty action creating further controversy. Thus means of indirect management over the Sikh site were to be devised, finalising by autumn of 1859. The Lieutenant-Governor decided to hold a meeting, arranged by Frederick Cooper (Deputy Commissioner of Amritsar), to delimitate what the future arrangements regarding the temple's management should be. The meeting was held in 1859 headed by Raja Teja Singh of Sheikhupura at his residence. The meeting was to resolve any disputes over the management of shrine and set-out the framework for managing them, with the meeting being attended also by Deputy Commissioner Cooper. Being attended by prominent chiefs, officials, and other notable figures, the meeting had two objects: define the roles and responsibilities of a new management system and determine what extent the British government would play in such a system, with the group coming to an agreement on 12 September 1859. A Sikh who played a large role in its formulation was Rai Mul Singh. A new document, entitled Dastur ul-Amal ("administration paper"), was formulated in 1859 to restructure the administration of the complex, with this document's outline being followed until the Gurdwara Reform movement of the 1920s.

Thus through the dastur of 1859, the pujaris became servants of the Golden Temple and any parties that had rights over the shrine and its institutions, but the pujaris could still enjoy the temple's property and income. The position of sarbarah was created as the main manager of the complex. Furthermore, in 1860 there was rivalry between Jodh Singh and Pardaman Singh over who should be appointed as the sarbarah. After the administrative regulations (dastur-ul-amal) were created by Sikh delegates, a committee (that the British had direct-control over) was created that could appoint a manager for the complex. The committee consisted of nine trustees (sardars), who worked regularly regarding the finances, administration, and discipline regarding the complex whilst the sarbarah carried out the instructions of the nine sardars. The committee of trustees also acted as the Municipal Committee of the town of Amritsar.

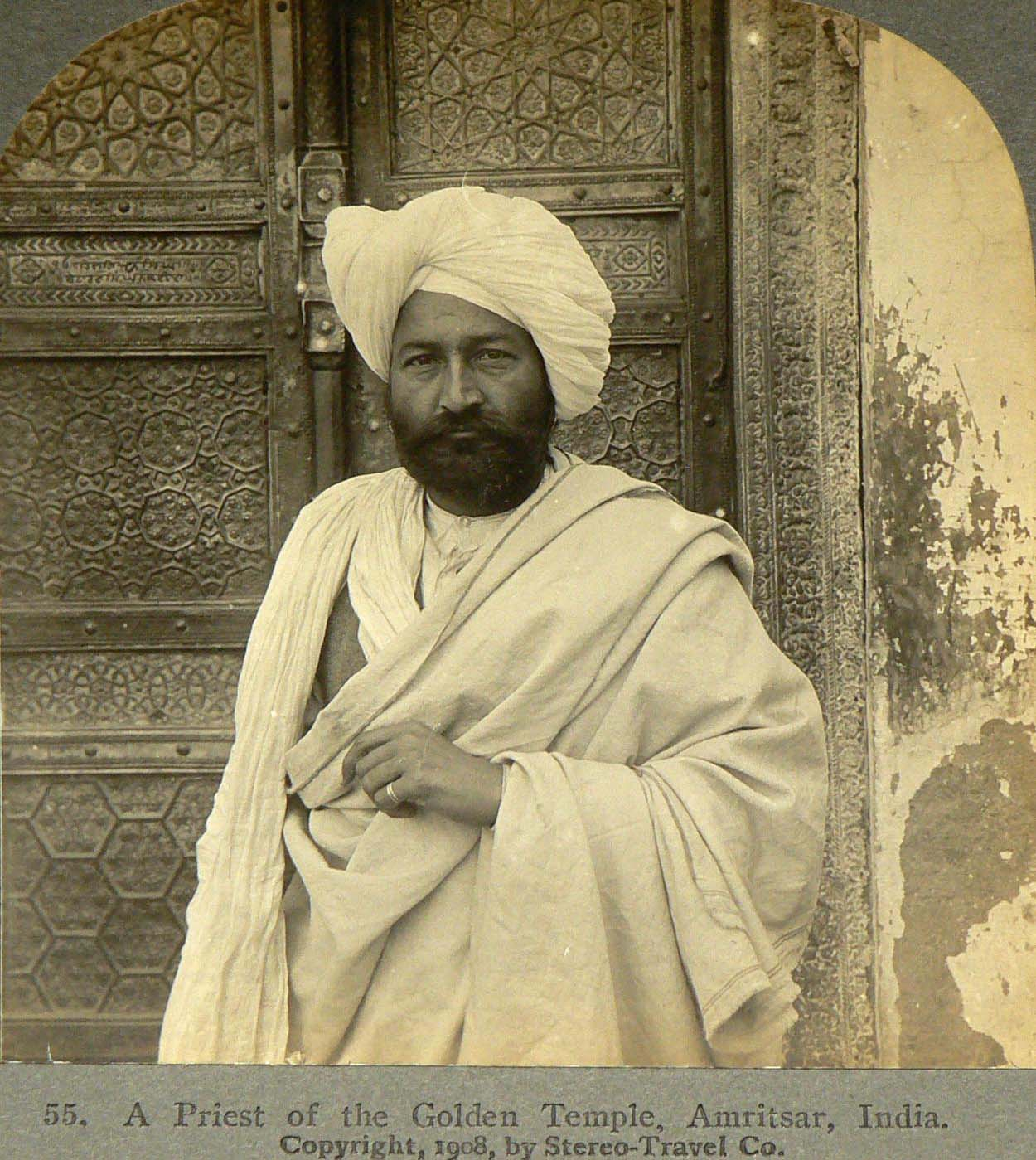
"A Priest of the Golden Temple," from a stereoscopic viewing set, 1908

Just prior to the finalisation of the Akali movement with the handover of authority to the SGPC, the head granthi of the site was Fateh Singh, assisted by Gurbachan Singh and Partap Singh. Partap Singh refused to recognise the authority of the SGPC, tied a black turban to signal dissent and departed from the administration of the site. Fateh Singh would later resign from his position in the management of the complex.

=== List of managers ===
The list of managers of the complex during Sikh and colonial periods is as follows:

No.	Name of manager (sarbarah)
1.	Desa Singh Majithia
2.	Lehna Singh Majithia
3.	Jodh Singh
4.	Mangal Singh Ramgarhia
5.	Man Singh Waraich
6.	Arjan Singh Chahal
7.	Jawala Singh
8.	Arur Singh Shergill
9.	Bahadur Singh
10.	Sundar Singh Ramgarhia

=== List of granthis ===
A granthi is a person of the Sikh religion who is a ceremonial reader of the Guru Granth Sahib. Here is list of granthis of the complex:

List of head and assistant granthis of the Golden Temple (1604–1983)
No.	Name of Head Granthi	Assistant Granthi (second grade)	Assistant Granthi (third grade)	Assistant Granthi (fourth grade)
1.	Baba Buddha			
2.	Bhai Mani Singh			
3.	Gopal Das Udasin			
4.	Chanchal Singh Nai			
5.	Atma Singh			
6.	Sham Singh	Makhan Singh Arora (Note: Makhan Singh died in September 1863.)	Gopal Singh Brahman	
7.	Jassa Singh Arora	Ghaniya Singh Arora	Diwan Singh Brahman	
8.	Jawahar Singh Saini	Bhagat Singh Arora	Hira Singh Brahman	
9.	Harnam Singh Saini	Sunder Singh Arora	Partap Singh Brahman	
10.	Fateh Singh Arora	Sant Singh Arora	Partap Singh Brahman	
10.	Fateh Singh Arora	Gurbachan Singh Arora	Partap Singh Brahman	
Shiromani Gurdwara Parbandhak Committee takes control of the complex (1925)
11.	Fateh Singh	Gurdit Singh	Kartar Singh	Labh Singh
11.	Fateh Singh	Thakur Singh	Kartar Singh	Labh Singh
11.	Fateh Singh	Bhupinder Singh	Kartar Singh	Labh Singh
11.	Fateh Singh	Chet Singh	Kirpal Singh	Labh Singh
12.	Kirpal Singh	Sohan Singh	Giani Mani Singh	Sahib Singh
13.	Sahib Singh	Sohan Singh	Mohan Singh	Sampuran Singh

== Gallery ==
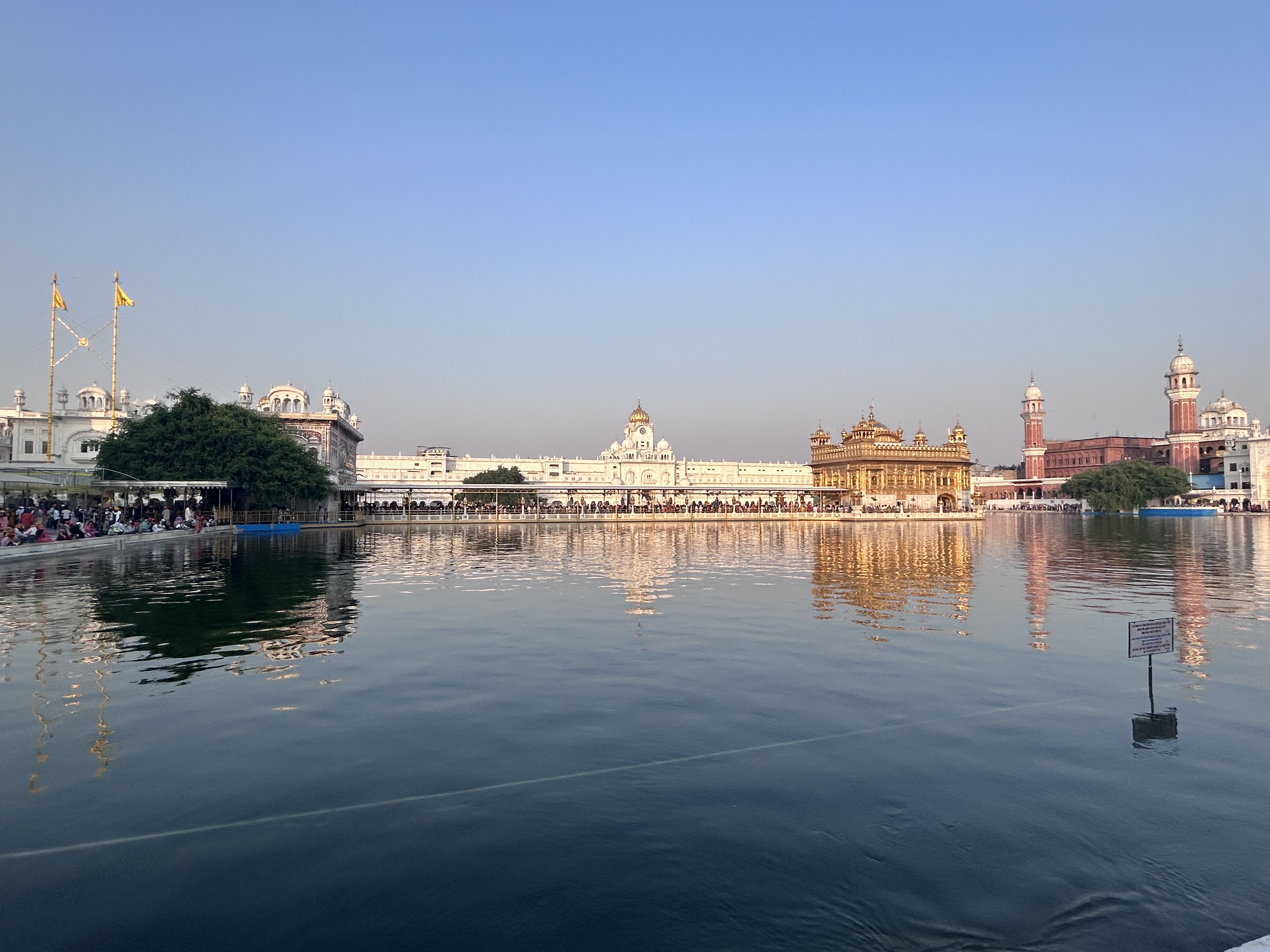
Day time complete view of Golden Temple complex

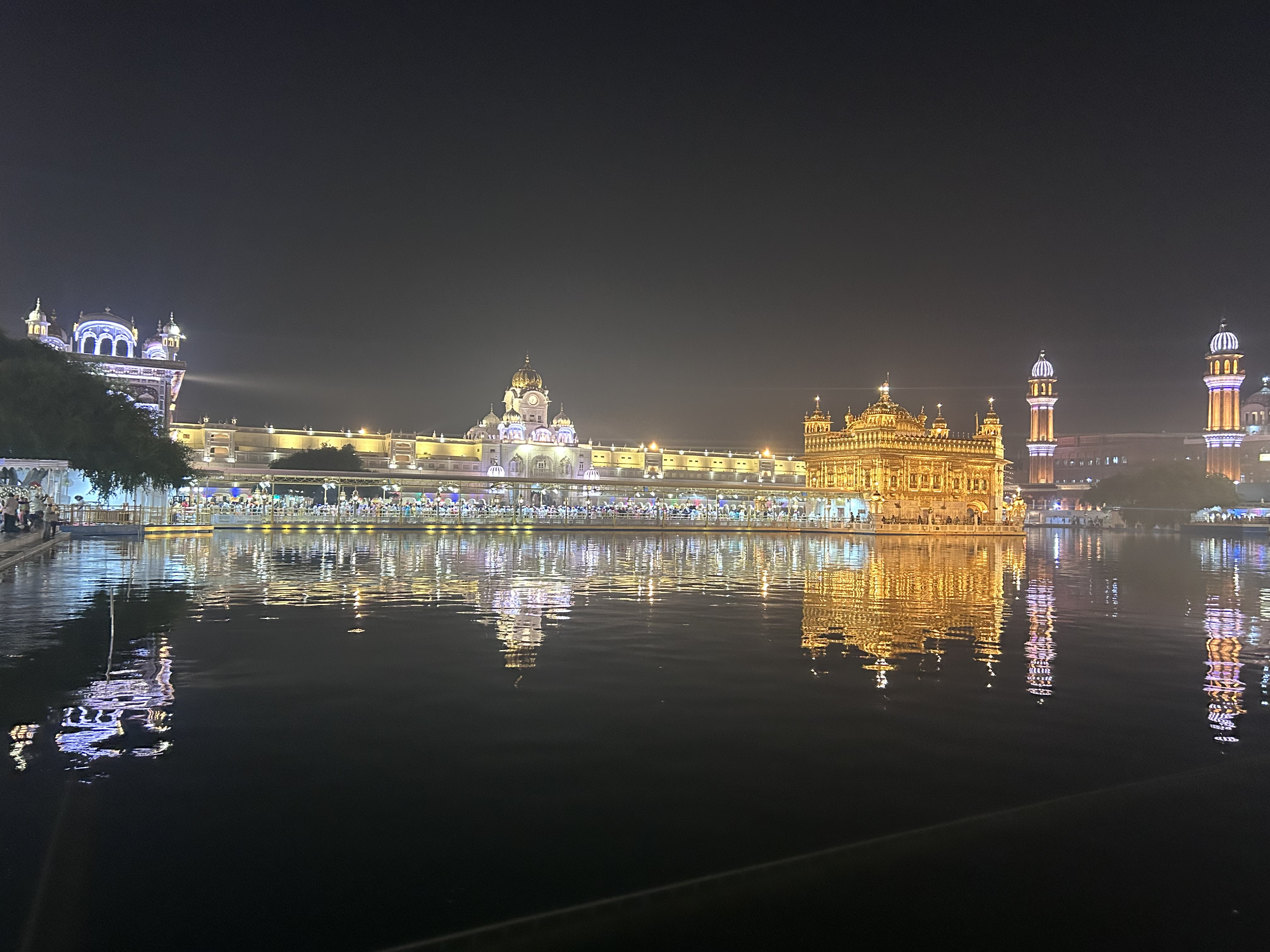
Complete view of Golden Temple complex at night

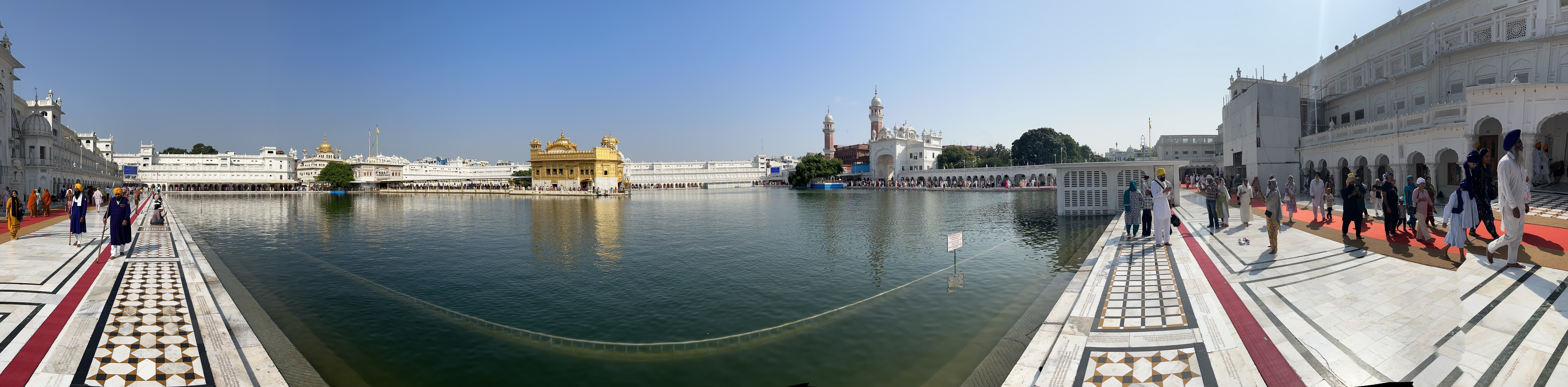
Panoramic view of Golden Temple complex

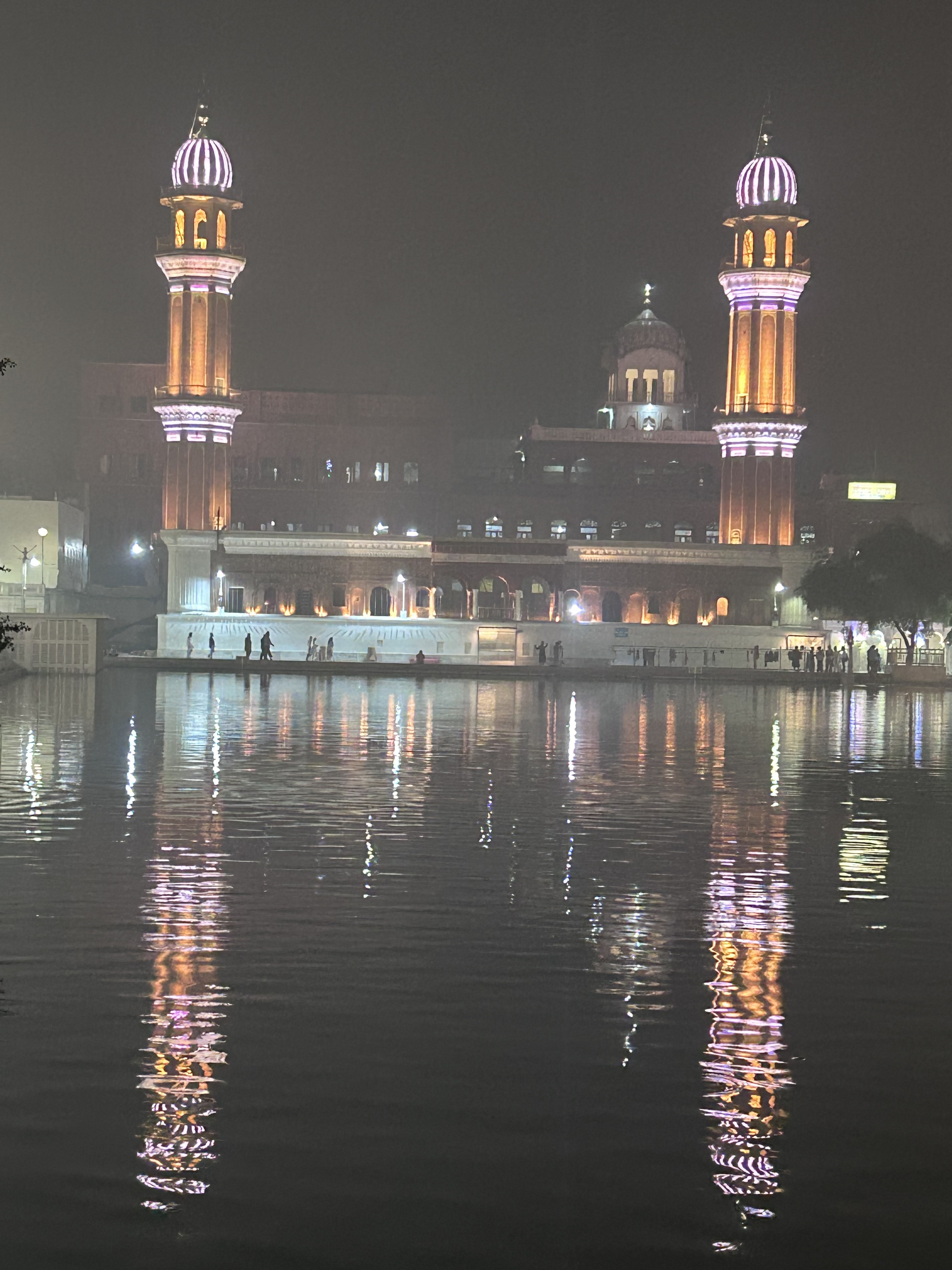
Ramgarhia Bunga, Golden Temple (night view)

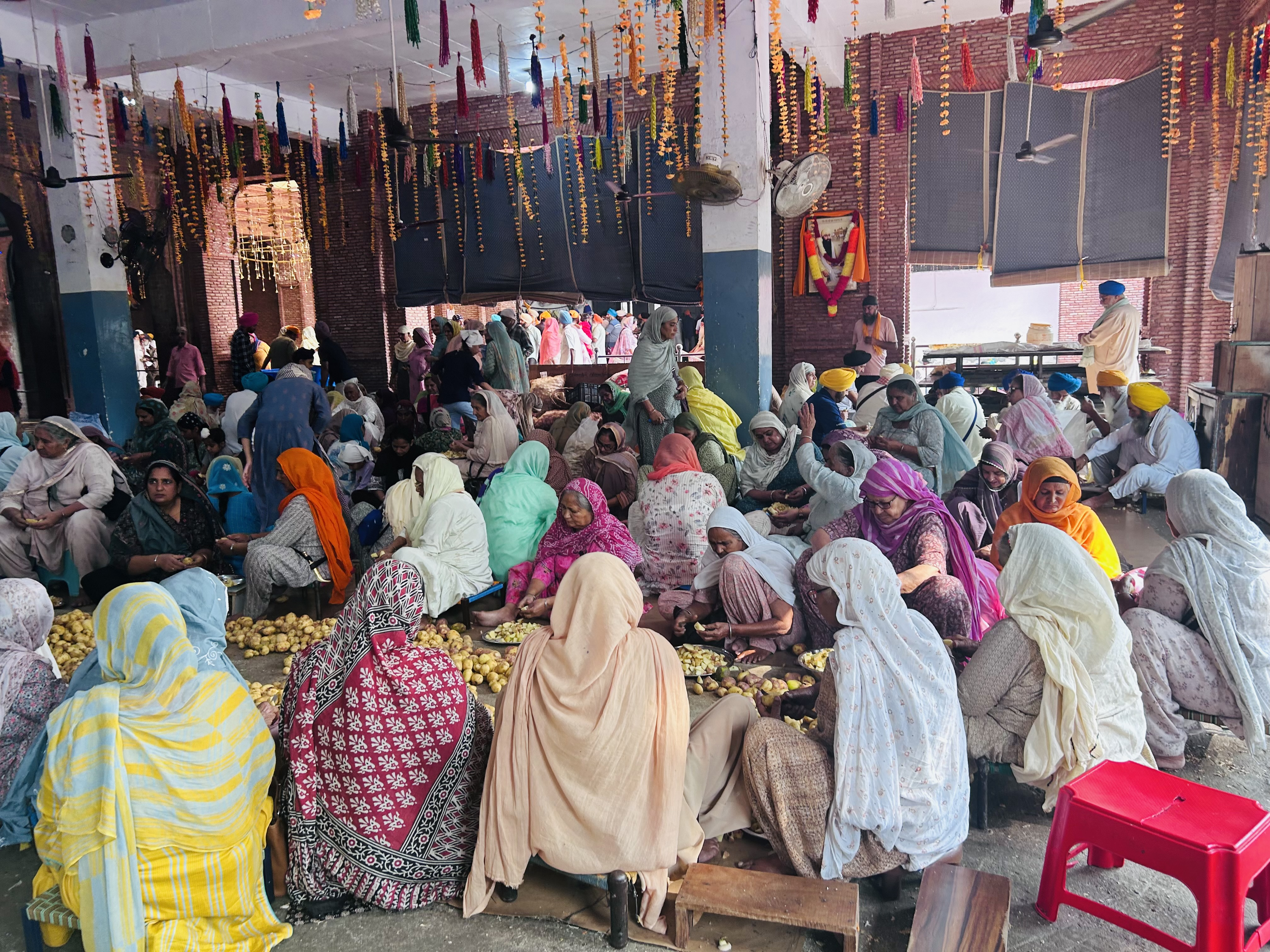
Langar (participatory kitchen), Golden Temple

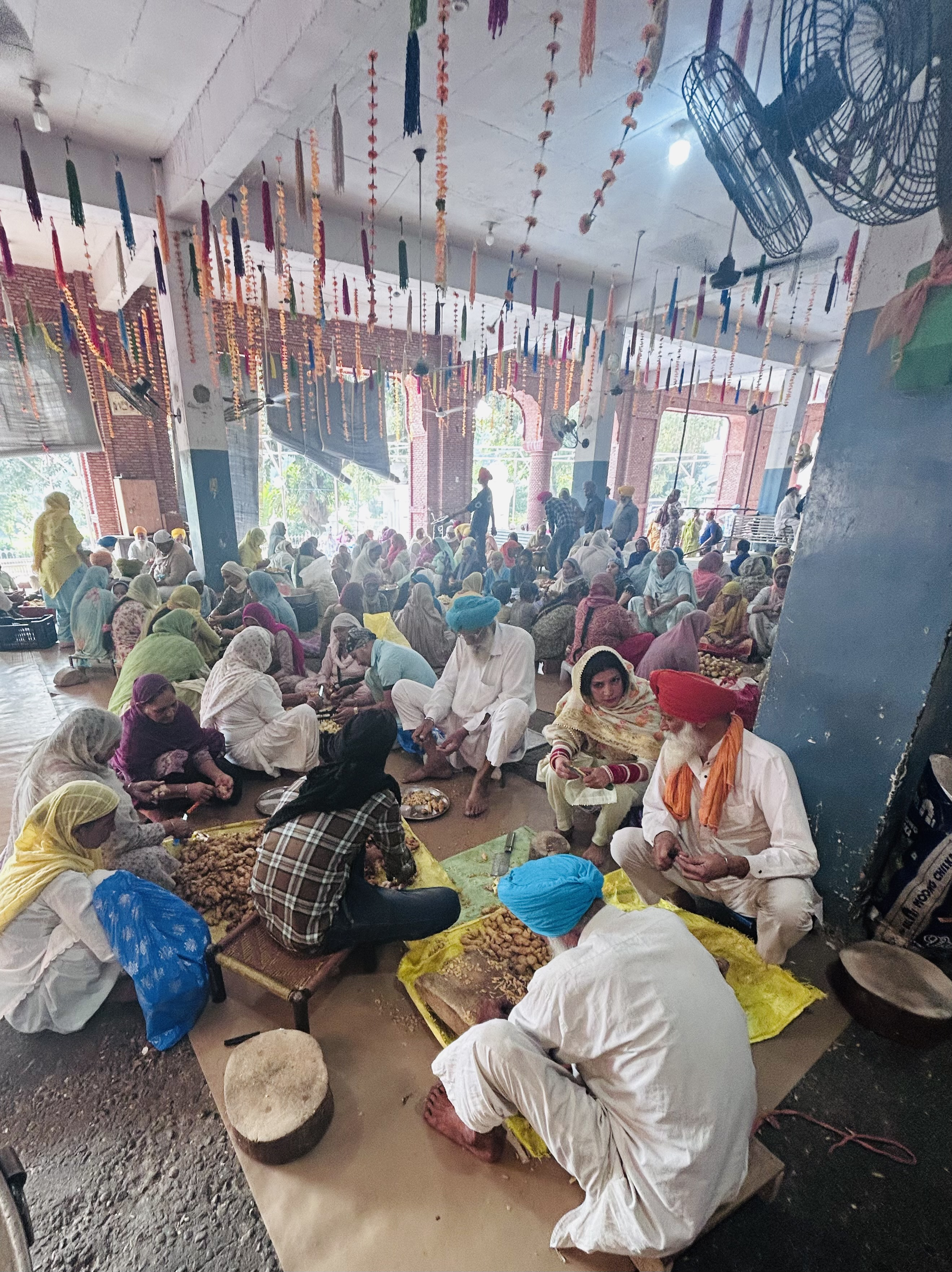
Gender neutral langar, Golden Temple

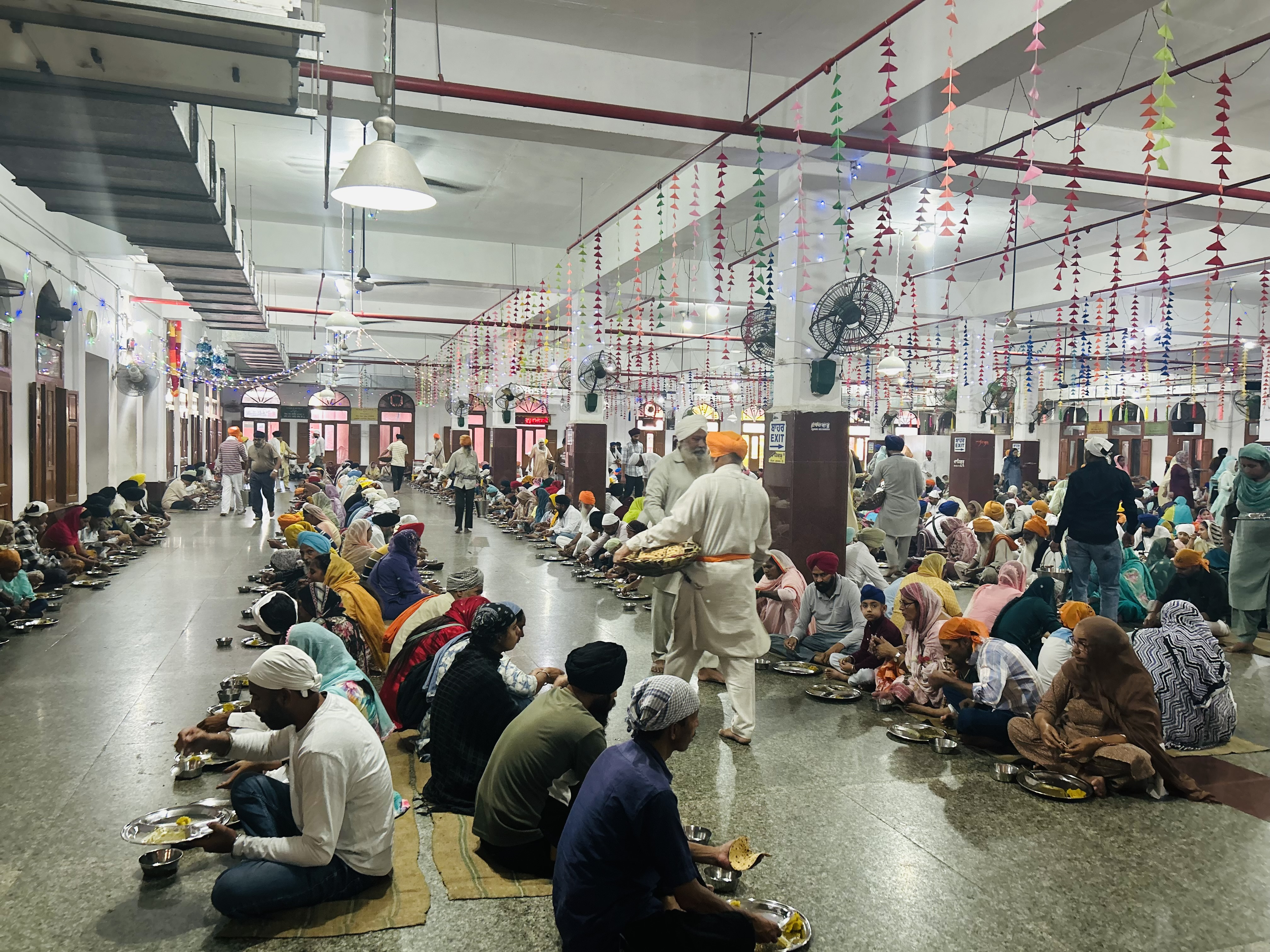
Serving of langar, Golden Temple

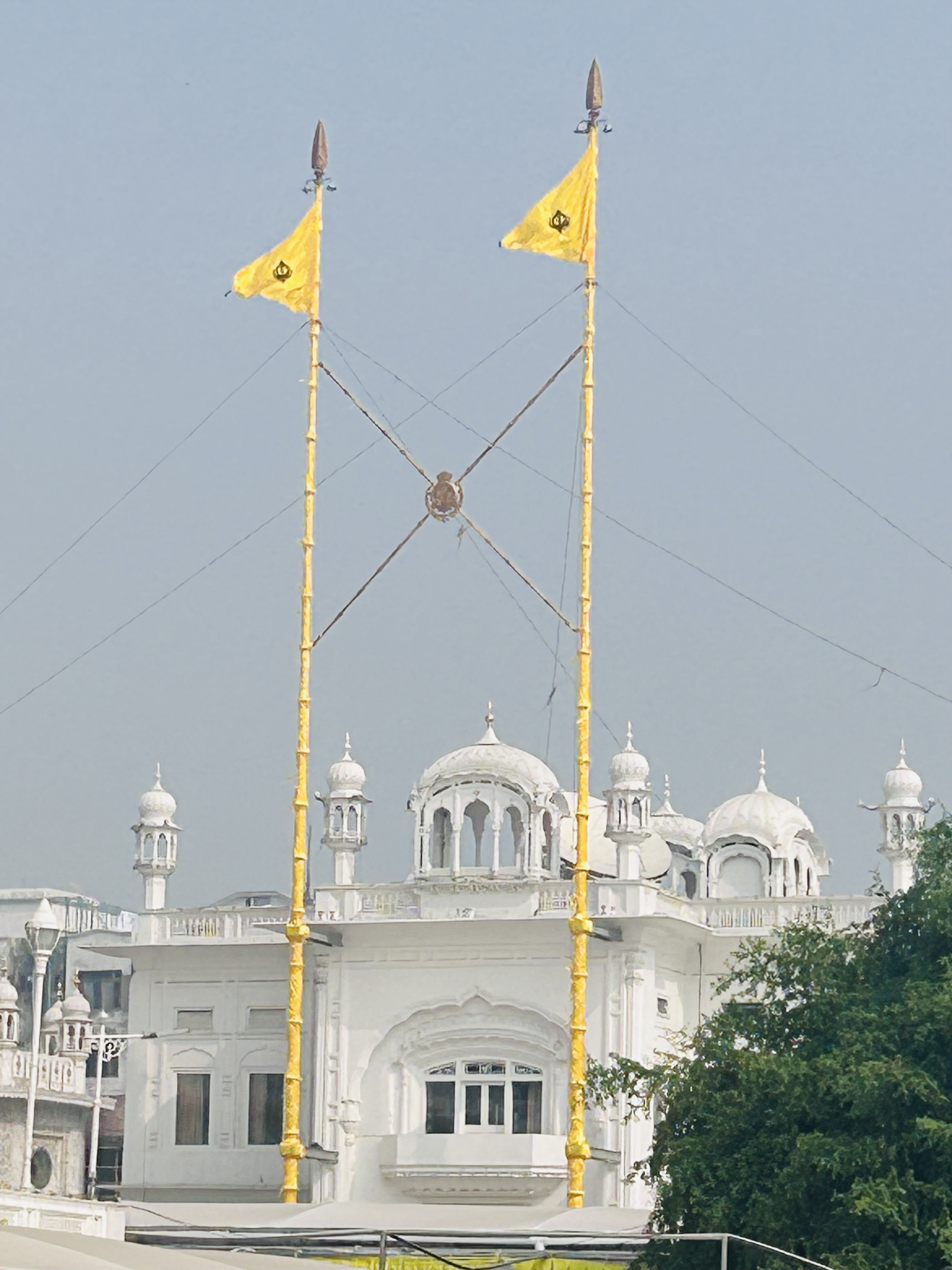
Miri-Piri, the twin Nishan Sahib flags, Golden Temple

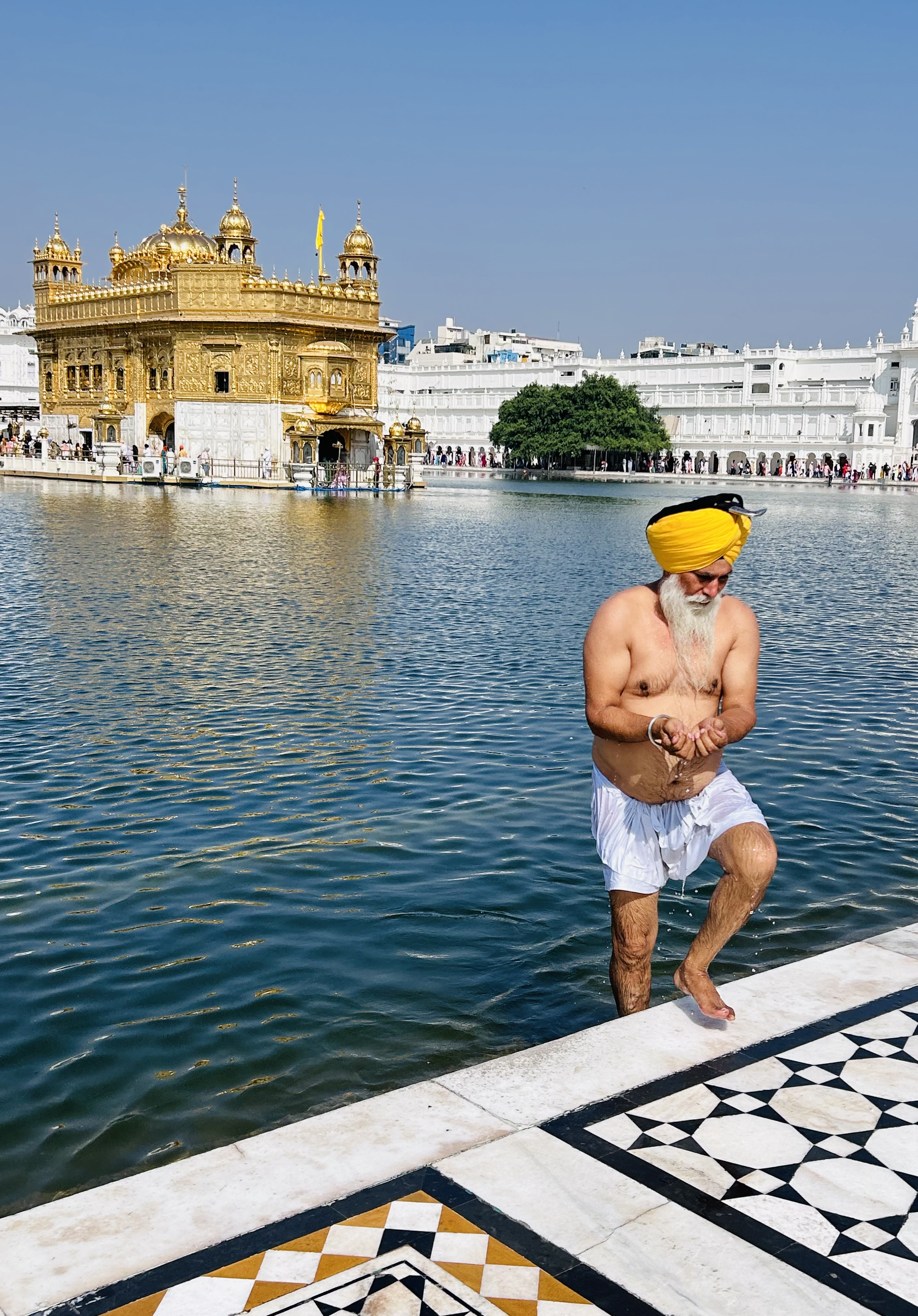
A baptised Sikh devotee at Golden Temple after taking holy bath in Sarovar (sacred lake)

== See also ==
- Golden Temple, Vellore
- Amritsar Jamnagar Expressway
- Amritsar Ring Road
- Delhi Amritsar Katra Expressway
- Gurudwara Sis Ganj Sahib
- Hazur Sahib Nanded
- List of Gurudwaras
- Takht Sri Patna Sahib
