= Gaganjit Singh Barnala =

Indian politician

Member Punjab Legislative Assembly
- In office 2002–2007

Personal details
- Party: Shiromani Akali Dal (Punar Surjit)
- Other political affiliations: Shiromani Akali Dal (Longowal); Shiromani Akali Dal
- Parent(s): Surjit Singh Barnala (father); Surjit Kaur Barnala (mother)
- Occupation: Politician

Gaganjit Singh Barnala is an Indian Politician from the state of Punjab.

== Political career ==
Barnala represented the Dhuri Assembly Constituency and was a member of the Punjab Legislative Assembly from 2002 to 2007.

Barnala is a member of Shiromani Akali Dal (Punar Surjit), previously being a member of Shiromani Akali Dal (Longowal) and the Shiromani Akali Dal.

== Personal life ==
Barnala's father Surjit Singh Barnala was the former Chief Minister of Punjab and former Governor of Tamil Nadu, Uttarakhand, Andhra Pradesh he was also a Union Minister in the Government of India.

Barnala was named as an accused in a rape case in 2006 but was acquitted of all charges in 2009.

== Electoral performance ==
2002 Punjab Legislative Assembly election : Dhuri
Party	Candidate	Votes	%	±%
SAD	Gaganjit Singh	25,538	26.57	▼0.71
SAD(M)	Iqbal Singh	23,979	24.95	New entry
Independent	Dhanwant Singh	22,030	22.92	▼8.34
CPI	Achhra Singh	9,686	10.08	▼1.08
BSP	Sultan Begum	8,368	8.71	▼2.95
NCP	Rajwant Singh	4,722	4.91	New entry
LBP	Baldev Singh	1,363	1.42	New entry
Independent	Jaswinder Singh	425	0.44	New entry
Margin of victory		1,559	1.62	
Total valid votes		96,111		
Rejected ballots		0		
Turnout		96,111	72.38	
Registered electors		1,32,793		
SAD gain from Independent		Swing		

2007 Punjab Legislative Assembly election : Dhuri
Party	Candidate	Votes	%	±%
Independent	Iqbal Singh Jhundan	36,469	31.87	New entry
INC	Mai Roop Kaur	33,290	29.09	New entry
SAD	Gaganjit Singh Barnala	24,887	21.75	▼4.82
BSP	Dhanwant Singh	13,150	11.49	▲2.78
CPI	Maninder Singh	2,627	2.30	▼7.78
SAD(M)	Karnail Singh	1,112	0.97	▼23.98
Independent	Lachhaman Singh	714	0.62	New entry
LJP	Amar Singh	549	0.48	New entry
Independent	Mohd. Samsad	415	0.36	New entry
Independent	Iqbal Singh	361	0.32	New entry
Independent	Rajinder Singh	326	0.28	New entry
Independent	Baljeet Singh	324	0.28	New entry
Independent	Manjinder Singh	205	0.18	New entry
Margin of victory		3,179	2.78	
Total valid votes		1,14,429		
Rejected ballots		35		
Turnout		1,14,464		
Registered electors		1,38,315		
Independent gain from SAD		Swing		
