= Simranjit Singh Mann =

Indian politician (born 1955)

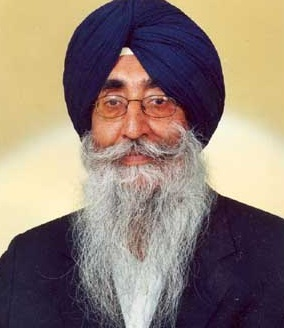

Member of Parliament, Lok Sabha
- In office 26 June 2022 – 4 June 2024
- Preceded by: Bhagwant Mann
- Succeeded by: Gurmeet Singh Meet Hayer
- Constituency: Sangrur
- In office 6 October 1999 – 13 May 2004
- Preceded by: Surjit Singh Barnala
- Succeeded by: Sukhdev Singh Dhindsa
- Constituency: Sangrur
- In office 2 December 1989 – 13 March 1991
- Preceded by: Tarlochan Singh Tur
- Succeeded by: Surinder Singh Kairon
- Constituency: Tarn Taran

President of Shiromani Akali Dal (Amritsar)
- Incumbent
- Assumed office 1 May 1994

Member of Shiromani Gurdwara Parbandhak Committee
- In office 1996–2011
- Constituency: Bassi Pathana

Personal details
- Born: 20 May 1945 (age 81) Shimla, Punjab, British India (present-day Himachal Pradesh, India)
- Party: Shiromani Akali Dal (Amritsar)
- Other political affiliations: Shiromani Akali Dal (until 1991)
- Spouse: Geetinder Kaur Mann
- Children: 3 (Including Emaan Singh Mann)
- Parent(s): Sardar Joginder Singh Mann and Sardarni Gurbachan Kaur
- Education: B.A. (honours) (gold medalist)
- Alma mater: Govt. College, Chandigarh
- Occupation: Politician
- Profession: Agriculturist & Police Officer

Simranjit Singh Mann (born 20 May 1945) is a former Indian Police Service officer and a former Member of the Parliament in the Lok Sabha, the lower house of the Parliament of India, representing the constituency of Sangrur from 2022 till 2024. He lost elections in 2024 to Gurmeet Singh Meet Hayer. He is the president of the political party Shiromani Akali Dal (Amritsar). Mann has served three-times as an MP; once from Taran Tarn between 1989 and 1991, and twice from Sangrur between 1999-2004 and between 2022 and 2024.

== Early life ==
Simranjit Singh Mann was born in Shimla on 20 May 1945. His maternal grandfather was Arur Singh, former sarbarah of the Golden Temple complex during British-rule. His father, Joginder Singh Mann, was a speaker of the Punjab Vidhan Sabha in 1967.

Mann was educated at the Bishop Cotton School, Shimla and Government College Chandigarh. He was a gold medalist in history.

== Indian Police Service ==
Mann joined the Indian Police Service in 1967, and served in the Punjab Cadre of the Service.

He served as Aide-de-camp (ADC) to the Governor of Punjab. He was also posted as a police officer in several districts. He served in several positions, including ASP Ludhiana City, Addl. SP Ferozepur, SP Hoshiarpur, SSP Faridkot, AIG GRP Punjab-Patiala division, Deputy Director of Vigilance Bureau Chandigarh, Deputy Inspector General of Punjab Armed Police, and DIG (Group Commandant) of CISF, Bombay.

He resigned from Indian Police Service on 18 June 1984 in protest of Operation Blue Star. In July 1984 he was dismissed from IPS.

== Political career ==
He was charged with the conspiracy to assassinate Indira Gandhi. He was arrested on 29 November 1984 and spent five years in Bhagalpur prison.

He was elected as the president of the new party United Shiromani Akali Dal.

Due to his 1984 Political involvements he won 1989 Lok sabha elections from Tarn Taran (Lok Sabha constituency) in absentia with their 6 other candidates on Shiromani Akali Dal (Amritsar) ticket and 3 other candidates also won backed by them. Afterwards he won 1999 Lok Sabha elections from Sangrur Lok Sabha constituency. He also won 1996, 2004 SGPC elections from Bassi Pathana.

=== Member of Parliament in Lok Sabha ===
==== 1989–1991 ====
He was elected in absentia to the Lok Sabha representing the constituency of Tarn Taran by an overwhelming majority, and unconditionally released "in the interests of the State" in November 1989, with all charges dropped. By this time he had spent five years in prison.

In 1990, Mann insisted on bearing his Kirpan (small sword) into the Parliament session, a religious rite in the Sikh Faith. The security regulations of the Parliament did not allow arms into the house. Accordingly, was denied entry into the Sansad Bhavan (Parliament house) with the weapon. Mann decided to not attend the Parliament. He subsequently resigned his seat in protest.

==== 1999-2004 ====
On 3 November 1999, after Mann was elected to the Lok Sabha by winning in the Sangrur Lok Sabha constituency, the Punjab and Haryana High Court ordered the Government of India and the Passport Office in Chandigarh to issue a passport to him.

On 23 March 2004, Prakash Singh Badal accused Mann of running derogatory ads against him and indulging in character assassination.

He contested re-election in the 2004 Indian general election from Sangrur constituency but lost the election and came in third position.

He remained the president of the SAD (Amritsar) party for eighteen years. In the 2007 Punjab Legislative Assembly election SAD (Amritsar) contested on 60 seats. Radical organization Dal Khalsa (International) had supported candidates of SAD (Amritsar). Mann had contested from Dhanaula Assembly constituency and his son Emaan Singh Mann contested from Sirhind. All the 60 candidates including Mann lost the election with big margins. Most candidates of SAD (Amritsar) had lost their security deposit in the election. Mann offered to resign after his party's poor performance.

==== 2022-2024 ====
In the 2022 Punjab Legislative Assembly election, he lost to Jaswant Singh Gajjanmajra of the Aam Aadmi Party in the Amargarh Assembly Constituency.

In June 2022, he won the by-poll for the Sangrur Lok Sabha constituency vacated by then MP, Bhagwant Mann, who went to become Chief Minister of Punjab, Mann won the election by a margin of 5,822 votes. During the election he campaigned for the release of Sikh prisoners. His grandson was in-charge of his election campaign.

In August 2022, he objected to President Droupadi Murmu being referred to as the name "Rashtrapati". He said, "I strongly believe Rashtrapati word is an insult to a woman President." His comments were expunged from the records of the parliament. He asked for elections in the Shiromani Gurdwara Parbandhak Committee (SGPC), the apex religious body of Sikhs.

He lost the Sangrur seat in 2024 General elections to Meet Hayer of Aam Aadmi Party.

== Political positions ==
=== Khalistan ===
Mann is a proponent of Sikh nation state Khalistan. Under his leadership, his party SAD (A) continued its position of creating Khalistan as a buffer state between India and Pakistan. Under him, SAD (A) continued spreading the ideology of Jarnail Singh Bhindranwale.

Every year his supporters gather in the sacred Golden Temple and raise pro-Khalistan slogans. He dedicated his 2022 Lok Sabha election victory to the Khalistan separatist leader Jarnail Singh Bhindranwale.

On 20 March 2023, Mann's Twitter account was blocked in India. Mann had tweeted condemning the Punjab Police's operation against separatist leader Amritpal Singh and the arrest of his supporters.

=== Bhagat Singh ===
In 2007, Mann had called freedom fighter Bhagat Singh, a "petty terrorist". A lawsuit was filed against him, but the prosecution failed to prove its case and he was acquitted by the civil court in 2013. After his release, Mann said, "My acquittal has vindicated my words that Bhagat Singh was a terrorist and not a martyr."

In 2015, he objected to naming the Chandigarh airport after Bhagat Singh and called him a terrorist. He had said, "Bhagat Singh is neither a martyr nor a national hero. He is a terrorist. We are against the naming of Chandigarh International airport as Shaheed-E-Azam Sardar Bhagat Singh Airport."

In 2022, he called Bhagat Singh "a terrorist" involved in "terror activities in pre-Independent India". AAP leaders condemned the statement and asked him to apologize. Residents of Khatkar Kalan, Bhagat Singh's native village protested near the Bhagat Singh Museum, shouted slogans of "Death to Simranjit Singh Mann", hit his effigy with shoes and burnt it.

=== General Reginald Dyer ===
In 1919, after General Reginald Dyer's Jallianwala Bagh massacre, Mann's maternal grandfather Arur Singh, then sarbarah (in-charge) of the Golden Temple had honoured General Dyer with a "siropa" at Akal Takht. Singh was a British government appointee. Arur Singh's act hurt Sikh psyche and is considered a "Black chapter" in Sikh history. In July 2022, Mann defended the act of his grandfather saying he did it to pacify Dyer's anger.

== Family ==
Mann is married to Geetinder Kaur, who is a sister of Preneet Kaur, the wife of former Punjab CM Amarinder Singh. The couple have a son and two daughters.

== Electoral performance ==
1989 Indian general election: Tarn Taran
| Party | Candidate | Votes | % | ±% |
|---|---|---|---|---|
| SAD(A) | Simranjit Singh Mann | 527,707 | 88.1 | |
| INC | Ajit Singh Mann | 47,290 | 7.9 | |
| Independent | Jaltar Singh Mehlanwala | 5,234 | 0.9 | |
| Majority | | 480,417 | 80.2 | |
| Turnout | | 599,322 | 63.6% | |
| Registered electors | | 942,162 | | |
| SAD(A) gain from SAD | | Swing | | |

General Election 1996: Sangrur
| Party | Candidate | Votes | % | ±% |
|---|---|---|---|---|
| SAD | Surjit Singh Barnala | 238,131 | 31.4 | |
| SAD(A) | Simranjit Singh Mann | 162,479 | 21.4 | |
| CPI(M) | Chand Singh Chopra | 156,770 | 20.7 | |
| INC | Gurcharan Singh Dadhaboor | 140,877 | 18.6 | |
| Majority | | 75,652 | 10.0 | |
| Turnout | | 757,827 | 71.6 | |
| SAD gain from INC | | Swing | | |

Punjab Assembly election, 1997: Qila Raipur
| Party | Candidate | Votes | % | ±% |
|---|---|---|---|---|
| SAD | Parkash Singh Badal | 38,532 | 44.74 | New entry |
| CPI(M) | Tarsem Jodhan | 27,500 | 31.93 | ▼14.61 |
| SAD(A) | Simranjit Singh Mann | 15,377 | 17.85 | |
| INC | Jagdev Singh Jassowal | 4,716 | 5.48 | ▼22.24 |
| Majority | | 11,032 | 12.81 | ▼6.01 |
| Turnout | | 86,125 | 71.54 | ▲67.70 |
| Registered electors | | 120,385 | | |
| SAD gain from CPI(M) | | Swing | 13.41 | |

General Election 1998: Sangrur
| Party | Candidate | Votes | % | ±% |
|---|---|---|---|---|
| SAD | Surjit Singh Barnala | 297,393 | 39.8 | ▼8.40 |
| SAD(A) | Simranjit Singh Mann | 215,228 | 28.8 | ▲7.40 |
| INC | Gurcharan Singh Dadhaboor | 187,711 | 25.1 | ▲6.10 |
| CPI(M) | Chand Singh Chopra | 35,380 | 4.7 | ▼16.00 |
| Majority | | 82,165 | 11.0 | ▲1.00 |
| Turnout | | 7,47,116 | 66.4 | ▼5.20 |
| SAD hold | | | | |

General Election 1999: Sangrur
| Party | Candidate | Votes | % | ±% |
|---|---|---|---|---|
| SAD(A) | Simranjit Singh Mann | 298,846 | 41.7 | ▲12.90 |
| SAD | Surjit Singh Barnala | 212,529 | 29.7 | ▲0.90 |
| CPI(M) | Ajit Singh | 190,824 | 26.6 | ▲21.90 |
| Independent | Nirmal singh | 5,738 | 0.80 | N/A |
| Majority | | 86,317 | 12.1 | ▲1.10 |
| Turnout | | 7,16,182 | 62.5 | ▼3.90 |
| SAD(A) gain from SAD | | Swing | | |

General Election 2004: Sangrur
| Party | Candidate | Votes | % | ±% |
|---|---|---|---|---|
| SAD | Sukhdev Singh Dhindsa | 286,828 | 34.2 | ▲4.50 |
| INC | Arvind Khanna | 259,551 | 31.0 | N/A |
| SAD(A) | Simranjit Singh Mann | 216,898 | 25.9 | ▼ |
| BSP | Mangat Rai Bansal | 38,215 | 4.6 | N/A |
| Independent | Sukhdev Singh Bari | 14,289 | 1.7 | N/A |
| Independent | Mohamad Shamshad | 8,872 | 1.1 | N/A |
| Majority | | | | |
| Turnout | | | | = |
| SAD gain from SAD(A) | | Swing | | |

Assembly election, 2007: Dhanaula
| Party | Candidate | Votes | % | ±% |
|---|---|---|---|---|
| INC | Kuldip Singh Bhathal | 42,105 | | |
| SAD | Gobind Singh Longowal | 38581 | | |
| SAD(A) | Simranjit Singh Mann | 16303 | | |
| Independent | Rajwinder Kaur Rozzy Bhathal | 5869 | | |
| BSP | Karnail Singh Dulet | 3411 | | |
| CPI(ML)L | Labh Singh Aklia | 1569 | | |
| Turnout | | 107838 | | |

General Election 2009: Sangrur
| Party | Candidate | Votes | % | ±% |
|---|---|---|---|---|
| INC | Vijay Inder Singla | 358,670 | 38.52 | |
| SAD | Sukhdev Singh Dhindsa | 3,17,798 | 34.13 | |
| LBP | Balwant Singh Ramoowalia | 115,012 | 12.35 | |
| BSP | Mohmad. Jamil-Ur-Rehman | 69,943 | 7.51 | |
| SAD(A) | Simranjit Singh Mann | 33,714 | 3.62 | |
| Majority | | 40,872 | 4.39 | |
| Turnout | | 931,200 | 74.41 | |
| INC gain from SAD | | Swing | -14.06 | |

Punjab Assembly election, 2012: Fatehgarh Sahib
| Party | Candidate | Votes | % | ±% |
|---|---|---|---|---|
| INC | Kuljit Singh Nagra | 36,573 | 32.79 | New entry |
| SAD | Prem Singh Chandumajra | 33,035 | 29.62 | New entry |
| PPoP | Didar Singh Bhatti | 32,065 | 28.75 | New entry |
| SAD(A) | Simranjit Singh Mann | 3,234 | 2.9 | New entry |
| Independent | Harbans Lal | 2,163 | 1.94 | New entry |
| BSP | Tarlochan Singh | 1,748 | 1.57 | New entry |
| Majority | | 3,538 | 3.17 | |
| Turnout | | 111,529 | 84.45 | |
| Registered electors | | 149,715 | | |
| INC win (new seat) | | | | |

General Election 2014: Khadoor Sahib
| Party | Candidate | Votes | % | ±% |
|---|---|---|---|---|
| SAD | Ranjit Singh Brahmpura | 467,332 | 43.40 | ▼6.03 |
| INC | Harminder Singh Gill | 366,763 | 35.20 | New |
| AAP | Baldeep Singh | 166,763 | 12.25 | New |
| SAD(A) | Simranjit Singh Mann | 13,990 | | New |
| Margin of victory | | 100,569 | | ▼0.22 |
| Turnout | | 1,040,622 | 66.56 | ▼4.08 |
| SAD hold | | Swing | | |

Assembly election, 2017: Barnala
| Party | Candidate | Votes | % | ±% |
|---|---|---|---|---|
| AAP | Gurmeet Singh Meet Hayer | 47,606 | 35.49 | |
| INC | Kewal Singh Dhillon | 45,174 | 33.67 | |
| SAD | Surinder Pal Singh Sibia | 31,111 | 23.19 | |
| SAD(A) | Simranjit Singh Mann | 5,061 | 3.77 | |
| BSP | Paramjit Kaur | 2,369 | 1.77 | |
| NOTA | None of the above | 889 | 0.66 | |
| Registered electors | | 171,962 | | |
| AAP gain from INC | | | | |

General Election 2019: Sangrur
| Party | Candidate | Votes | % | ±% |
|---|---|---|---|---|
| AAP | Bhagwant Mann | 413,561 | 37.40 | ▼11.07 |
| INC | Kewal Singh Dhillon | 303,350 | 27.43 | ▲9.93 |
| SAD | Parminder Singh Dhindsa | 263,498 | 23.83 | ▼5.40 |
| SAD(A) | Simranjit Singh Mann | 48,365 | 4.37 | |
| LIP | Jasraj Singh Longia | 20,087 | 1.82 | |
| NOTA | None of the Above | 6,490 | 0.59 | ▲0.39 |
| Majority | | 110,211 | 9.97 | ▼10.46 |
| Turnout | | 1,107,256 | 72.40 | |
| AAP hold | | Swing | ▼10.5 | |

2022 Punjab Legislative Assembly election: Amargarh
| Party | Candidate | Votes | % | ±% |
|---|---|---|---|---|
| AAP | Jaswant Singh Gajjanmajra | 44,523 | 34.28 | ▲6.67 |
| SAD(A) | Simranjit Singh Mann | 38,480 | 29.63 | ▲29.17 |
| SAD | Iqbal Singh Jhundan | 26,068 | 20.07 | ▼9.88 |
| INC | Smit Singh | 16,923 | 13.03 | ▼26.01 |
| PLC | Sardar Ali | 1,342 | 1.03 | New entry |
| NOTA | None of the above | 595 | 0.46 | ▼ |
| Majority | | 6,043 | 4.65 | ▼ |
| Turnout | | 129,868 | 77.95 | |
| Registered electors | | 165,909 | | |
| AAP gain from INC | | | | |

2022 By-election: Sangrur
| Party | Candidate | Votes | % | ±% |
|---|---|---|---|---|
| SAD(A) | Simranjit Singh Mann | 253,154 | 35.61 | ▲31.24 |
| AAP | Gurmail Singh | 247,332 | 34.79 | ▼2.61 |
| INC | Dalvir Singh Goldy | 79,668 | 11.21 | ▼16.22 |
| BJP | Kewal Singh Dhillon | 66,298 | 9.33 | New |
| SAD | Bibi Kamaldeep Kaur Rajoana | 44,428 | 6.25 | ▼17.58 |
| NOTA | None of the Above | 2471 | 0.35 | |
| Majority | | 6,245 | 0.88 | |
| Turnout | | 7,10,919 | 45.3% | ▼27.1 |
| Registered electors | | 15,69,240 | | |
| SAD(A) gain from AAP | | Swing | ▲16.92 | |

General Election 2024: Sangrur
| Party | Candidate | Votes | % | ±% |
|---|---|---|---|---|
| AAP | Gurmeet Singh Meet Hayer | 364,085 | 36.06 | ▲1.27 |
| INC | Sukhpal Singh Khaira | 1,91,525 | 18.97 | ▲7.76 |
| SAD(A) | Simranjit Singh Mann | 1,87,246 | 18.55 | ▼17.06 |
| BJP | Arvind Khanna | 1,28,253 | 12.70 | ▲3.37 |
| SAD | Iqbal Singh Jhundan | 62,488 | 6.19 | ▼0.06 |
| NOTA | None of the Above | 3,820 | 0.38 | ▲0.03 |
| Majority | | 1,72,560 | ▲17.09 | ▲16.21 |
| Turnout | | 10,09,665 | | |
| Registered electors | | 15,56,601 | | |
| AAP gain from SAD(A) | | Swing | ▲1.27 | |

== See also ==
1. Parkash Singh Badal
2. Captain Amarinder Singh

Lok Sabha
| Preceded by Tarlochan Singh Tur | Member of Parliament for Tarn Taran; 1989 – 1991 | Succeeded by Surinder Singh Kairon |
| Preceded by Surjit Singh Barnala | Member of Parliament for Sangrur; 1999 – 2004 | Succeeded by Sukhdev Singh Dhindsa |
| Preceded by Bhagwant Mann | Member of Parliament for Sangrur; 2022 – 2024 | Succeeded by Gurmeet Singh Meet Hayer |
