= Gyani Labh Singh Bhikhi =

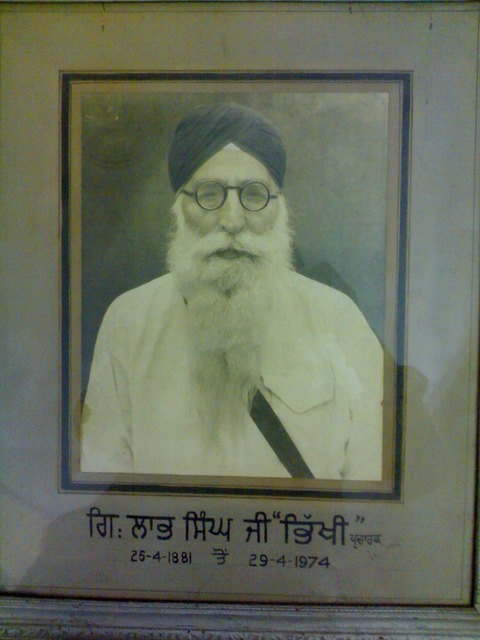
Gyani Labh Singh Bhikhi

Gyani Labh Singh Ji Bhikhi (25 April 1881 to 29 April 1974) was a freedom fighter from India and a preacher of Sikhism (Pracharak). He was born in Village Bhikhi, Sheikhupura District, now in Pakistan. From childhood, he spend his life in participating in the fight against the British Raj, for India's independence. Wherever he went for delivering speeches for Independence, thousands of people came to listen him from far away places. It is a fact that sometimes he gave speeches to crowd of thousands without the aid of a microphone or speaker. He was a very daring, patriotic and straight forward person. He went to jail several times. He did not believe in and was against the caste system, that's why he added his village name 'Bhikhi' to his name instead of his surname/caste i.e. Kalra. He did not believe in superstitions. He was very much active in Jaito da Morcha, Guru Ke Bagh ka Morcha, Gurudwara Sudhar Lehar, Rail Roko Andolan, Chabiyaan da Morcha and many more. He wrote essays, poems and other writing material which encouraged his countrymen to fight jointly for their country's freedom and he also served Punjabi Literature warmly from every side.

He wrote three books namely

(1) Kartoot Bemukhan Dee

(2) Sachiyaan Baatan

(3) Navaa Kissa.

He was honoured with Praman Patra for his contributions in India's independence by Punjab Chief Minister S. Pratap Singh Kairon and the Tamra Patra for his contribution and participation in India's independence by the Indian Prime Minister Indira Gandhi as well as the Chief Minister of Punjab and President of India Giani Zail Singh.

After partition of 1947 he came and settled in Ludhiana, Punjab (India) with his family and there also he takes active part in religious cum social activities.

He died on 29 April 1974.

BELOW, an article Specially Published on the occasion of his 131st Birth anniversary in DAILY AJIT, A Leading Punjabi Language Newspaper, Jalandhar, Punjab, India. Dated 25 April 2012
