= Iqbal Singh Jhundan =

Indian politician and businessman

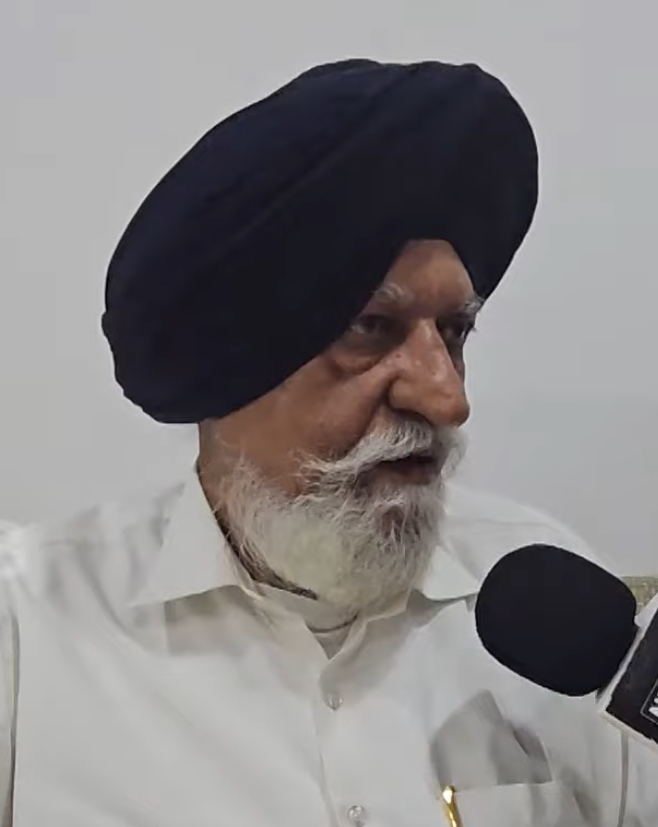

MLA, Punjab
- In office 2007 - 2012
- Preceded by: Gaganjit Singh Barnala
- Succeeded by: Arvind Khanna
- Constituency: Dhuri
- In office 2012 - 2017
- Preceded by: new constituency
- Succeeded by: Surjit Singh Dhiman
- Constituency: Amargarh

Personal details
- Born: 2 January 1962 (age 64) Jhundan, Punjab, India
- Party: Akali Dal (Waris Punjab De)
- Other political affiliations: Shiromani Akali Dal (Punar Surjit); Shiromani Akali Dal

Iqbal Singh Jhundan (born 2 January 1962) is an Indian politician of Akali Dal Waris Punjab De.

== Political career ==
Jhundan has served as Member of Legislative Assembly in Punjab from Dhuri (2007-2012) and from Amargarh (2012-2017). He was also a member of the Core Committee of Shiromani Akali Dal and observer of Sangrur, Barnala, and Malerkotla District. Jhundan was the Shiromani Akali Dal candidate for the 2024 Lok Sabha election from Sangrur.

Jhundan officially joined Akali Dal (Waris Punjab De) on 13 August 2026. He previously formed a separate faction within Shiromani Akali Dal (Punar Surjit) in July 2026.

== Electoral performance ==
2007 Punjab Legislative Assembly election : Dhuri
Party	Candidate	Votes	%	±%
Independent	Iqbal Singh Jhundan	36,469	31.87	New entry
INC	Mai Roop Kaur	33,290	29.09	New entry
SAD	Gaganjit Singh Barnala	24,887	21.75	▼4.82
BSP	Dhanwant Singh	13,150	11.49	▲2.78
CPI	Maninder Singh	2,627	2.30	▼7.78
SAD(M)	Karnail Singh	1,112	0.97	▼23.98
Independent	Lachhaman Singh	714	0.62	New entry
LJP	Amar Singh	549	0.48	New entry
Independent	Mohd. Samsad	415	0.36	New entry
Independent	Iqbal Singh	361	0.32	New entry
Independent	Rajinder Singh	326	0.28	New entry
Independent	Baljeet Singh	324	0.28	New entry
Independent	Manjinder Singh	205	0.18	New entry
Margin of victory		3,179	2.78	
Total valid votes		1,14,429		
Rejected ballots		35		
Turnout		1,14,464		
Registered electors		1,38,315		
Independent gain from SAD		Swing		

2012 Punjab Legislative Assembly election: Amargarh
Party	Candidate	Votes	%	±%
SAD	Iqbal Singh Jhundan	38,915	33.14	New entry
INC	Surjit Singh Dhiman	34489	29.37	New entry
PPoP	Ajit Singh Chandurain	23,347	19.88	New entry
BSP	Mohd Arshad	6,985	5.95	New entry
Independent	Rajnish Sharma	5,992	5.10	New entry
SAD(A)	Amrik Singh	312	0.27	New entry
Majority		4,426	3.77	
Turnout		117,435	85.26	
Registered electors				

2017 Punjab Legislative Assembly election: Amargarh
Party	Candidate	Votes	%	±%
INC	Surjit Dhiman	50,994	39.04	▲9.67
SAD	Iqbal Singh Jhundan	39,115	29.95	▼3.19
AAP	Jaswant Singh Gajjanmajra	36,063	27.61	New entry
CPI	Pritam Singh	696	0.53	New entry
SAD(A)	Karnail Singh	600	0.46	▲0.19
NOTA	None of the above	850	0.65	
Majority		11,879	9.03	
Turnout		131,553	84.19	
Registered electors		156,256		
INC gain from SAD				

2022 Punjab Legislative Assembly election: Amargarh
Party	Candidate	Votes	%	±%
AAP	Jaswant Singh Gajjanmajra	44,523	34.28	▲6.67
SAD(A)	Simranjit Singh Mann	38,480	29.63	▲29.17
SAD	Iqbal Singh Jhundan	26,068	20.07	▼9.88
INC	Smit Singh	16,923	13.03	▼26.01
PLC	Sardar Ali	1,342	1.03	New entry
NOTA	None of the above	595	0.46	▼
Majority		6,043	4.65	▼
Turnout		129,868	77.95	
Registered electors		165,909		
AAP gain from INC				

General Election 2024: Sangrur
Party	Candidate	Votes	%	±%
AAP	Gurmeet Singh Meet Hayer	364,085	36.06	▲1.27
INC	Sukhpal Singh Khaira	191,525	18.97	▲7.76
SAD(A)	Simranjit Singh Mann	187,246	18.55	▼17.06
BJP	Arvind Khanna	128,253	12.70	▲3.37
SAD	Iqbal Singh Jhundan	62,488	6.19	▼0.06
NOTA	None of the Above	3,820	0.38	▲0.03
Majority		172,560	▲17.09	▲16.21
Turnout		1,009,665		
Registered electors		1,556,601		
AAP gain from SAD(A)		Swing	▲1.27	
