= Surjit Singh Dhiman =

Indian politician from Punjab

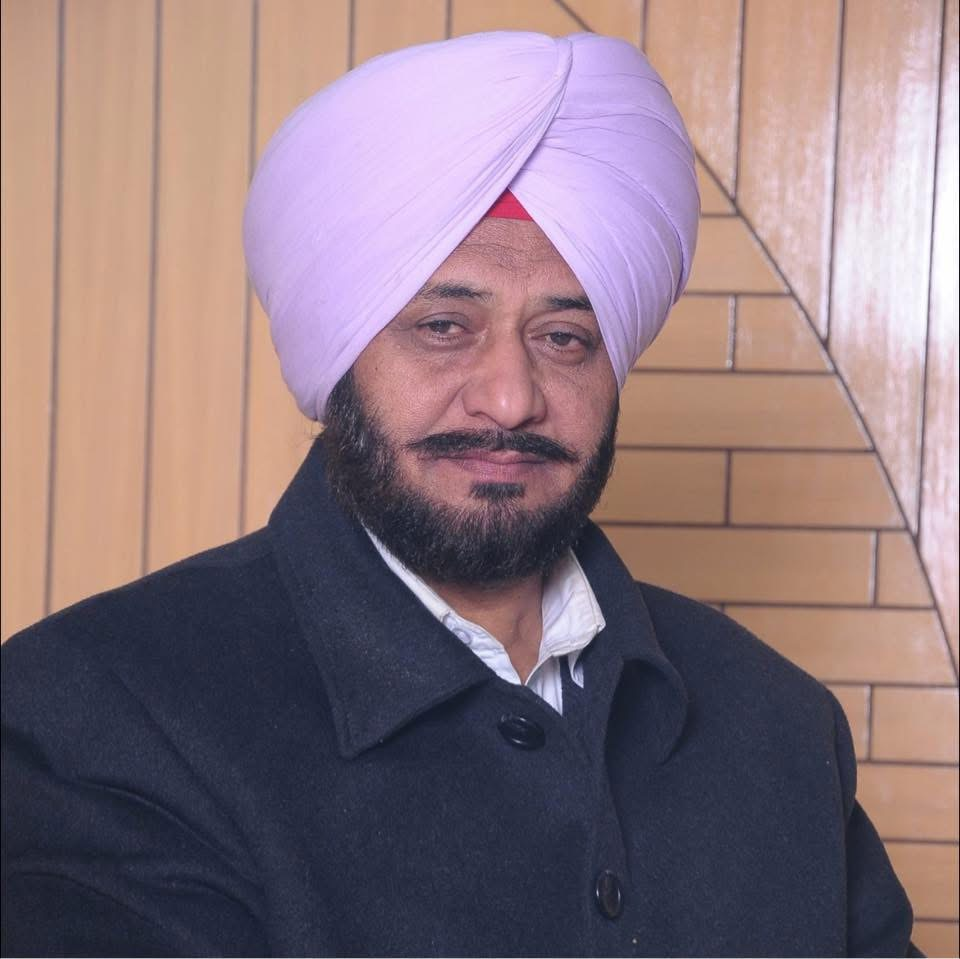

Member of the Punjab Legislative Assembly
- In office 2002 to 2007, 2007 to 2012 (Dirba) and 2017 – 2022
- Preceded by: Iqbal Singh Jhundan
- Succeeded by: Jaswant Singh Gajjan Majra
- Constituency: Amargarh

Personal details
- Born: Dirba
- Party: Indian National Congress
- Profession: Politician

Surjit Singh Dhiman is an Indian politician and a member of Indian National Congress. He became Member of Legislative Assembly (MLA) from Dirba Constituency during 2002 and 2007 elections. In the 2017 Punjab Legislative Assembly election, he was elected as the member of the Punjab Legislative Assembly from Amargarh Assembly constituency.

In 2022, he was expelled from Congress for alleged anti party activities.

== Member of Legislative Assembly ==
During 2002 Punjab legislative assembly elections, Surjit Singh Dhiman won as an independent candidate from his hometown, Dirba Assembly constituency seat. He later joined Indian National Congress and won Dirba seat again in 2007 Punjab Assembly elections. Dhiman represented the Amargarh between 2017-2022. He won the seat as a candidate of the Indian National Congress, beating the incumbent member of the Punjab Legislative Assembly Iqbal Singh Jhundan of the Shiromani Akali Dal.
