= Mohan Singh Tur =

Indian politician

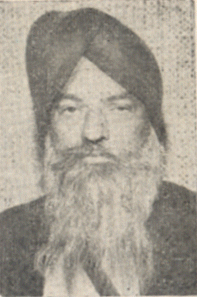

Jathedar of the Akal Takht
- In office 1962–1963
- Preceded by: Acchar Singh
- Succeeded by: Sadhu Singh Bhaura

President of Shiromani Gurdwara Prabhandak Committee
- In office 6 June 1973 – 30 November 1972
- Preceded by: Sant Chanan Singh
- Succeeded by: Gurcharan Singh Tohra

Member of Parliament, Lok Sabha
- In office 1977–1980
- Preceded by: Gurdial Singh Dhillon
- Succeeded by: Lehna Singh Tur
- Constituency: Tarn Taran, Punjab

Personal details
- Born: 1916 Tur Village, Amritsar District, Punjab, British India
- Died: July 30, 1979 (aged 62–63)
- Party: Shiromani Akali Dal

Mohan Singh Tur (1915–1979) was an Indian politician and former Jathedar of the Akal Takht and president of Shiromani Akali Dal. He was also known as Jathedar Mohan Singh Tur. He was elected to the Lok Sabha, the lower house of the Parliament of India from the Tarn Taran constituency of Punjab in 1977 as a member of the Akali Dal.

== Personal life ==
He was married to Gurdip Kaur. He had 5 sons and 3 daughters, Lehna Singh Tur was one of his sons and also his successor in 1980.

His son, Tarlochan Singh Tur (1947 – 2016), was also a politician.
