= Dhuri Assembly constituency =

Legislative Assembly constituency in Punjab State, India

Coordinates: 30.37°N 75.86°E

Dhuri
- Constituency No. 107 for the Punjab Legislative Assembly

Constituency details
- Country: India
- State: Punjab
- Division: Patiala
- District: Sangrur
- Lok Sabha constituency: Sangrur
- Established: 1951
- Total electors: 1,66,143 (Note: As of 2022)
- Reservation: None

Member of Legislative Assembly
- 16th Punjab Legislative Assembly
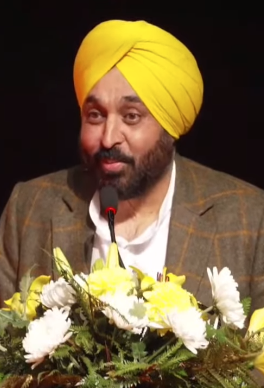
- Incumbent Bhagwant Mann; Chief Minister of Punjab
- Party: AAP
- Elected year: 2022

Dhuri Assembly constituency is a Punjab Legislative Assembly constituency in Sangrur district, Punjab state, India.

As of 2022, this constituency is represented by Bhagwant Mann, the chief minister of Punjab.

== Members of the Legislative Assembly ==
Most successful parties from Dhuri Vidhan Sabha
1. INC(9 Times) (45.0%)
2. SAD (5 Times) (25.0%)
3. CPI (3 Times) (15.0%)
4. IND (2 Times) (10.0%)
5. AAP (1 Time) (5.00%)

=== Patiala and East Punjab States Union ===
| Year | Con. No. | Res. | Member | Party |
|---|---|---|---|---|
| 1952 | 16 | None | Tirath Singh | Indian National Congress |
| 1954 (Note: Two member seat) | 43 | None | Lehna Singh | Indian National Congress |
| 1954 | 43 | None | Parduman Singh | Indian National Congress |

=== Punjab ===
| Year | Con. No. | Res. | Member | Party |
|---|---|---|---|---|
| 1957 (Note: Two member seat) | 112 | ST | Jasdev Singh | Indian National Congress |
| 1957 | 112 | ST | Jangir Singh | Communist Party of India |
| 1962 | 151 | SC | Bhan Singh | Communist Party of India |
| 1967 | 86 | None | T. Singh | Indian National Congress |
| 1969 | 86 | None | Sant Singh | Indian National Congress |
| 1972 | 86 | None | Achhra Singh | Communist Party of India |
| 1977 | 80 | None | Sant Singh | Shiromani Akali Dal |
| 1980 | 80 | None | Sant Singh | Shiromani Akali Dal |
| 1985 | 80 | None | Surinder Singh | Shiromani Akali Dal |
| 1992 | 80 | None | Dhanwant Singh | Indian National Congress |
| 1997 | 80 | None | Dhanwant Singh | Independent |
| 2002 | 80 | None | Gaganjit Singh | Shiromani Akali Dal |
| 2007 | 80 | None | Iqbal Singh Jhundan | Independent |
| 2012 | 107 | None | Arvind Khanna | Indian National Congress |
| 2015^ | 107 | None | Gobind Singh Longowal | Shiromani Akali Dal |
| 2017 | 107 | None | Dalvir Singh Goldy | Indian National Congress |
| 2022 | 107 | None | Bhagwant Mann | Aam Aadmi Party |

^Bye election

== Election results ==
=== 2027 ===
Punjab Assembly election, 2027: Dhuri
| Party | Candidate | Votes | % | ±% |
|---|---|---|---|---|
| AAP | Bhagwant Mann | | | |
| AD (WPD) | | | | New entry |
| INC | Aamrinder Singh Raja Warring | | | |
| BSP | | | | |
| SAD | Ranjit Singh Randhawa | | | |
| BJP | | | | |
| NOTA | None of the above | | | |
| Majority | | | | |
| Turnout | | | | |

=== 2022 ===
2022 Punjab Legislative Assembly election : Dhuri
| Party | Candidate | Votes | % | ±% |
|---|---|---|---|---|
| AAP | Bhagwant Mann | 82,592 | 64.29 | ▲27.87 |
| INC | Dalvir Singh Goldy | 24,386 | 18.98 | ▼19.64 |
| SAD | Parkash Chand Garg | 6,991 | 5.44 | ▼16.95 |
| BJP | Randeep Singh Deol | 5,436 | 4.23 | New entry |
| SAD(A) | Narinder Singh | 4,469 | 3.48 | ▲2.38 |
| SSM | Sarbjit Singh Alal | 1,188 | 0.92 | New entry |
| NOTA | None of the Above | 775 | 0.6 | |
| Margin of victory | | 58,206 | 45.4 | |
| Total valid votes | | 128,458 | 77.32 | |
| Rejected ballots | | 429 | | |
| Turnout | | 128,977 | 77.63 | |
| Registered electors | | 166,143 | | |
| AAP gain from INC | | Swing | | |

=== 2017 ===
2017 Punjab Legislative Assembly election : Dhuri
| Party | Candidate | Votes | % | ±% |
|---|---|---|---|---|
| INC | Dalvir Singh Goldy | 49,347 | 38.62 | ▲11.23 |
| AAP | Jasvir Singh Jassi Sekhon | 46,536 | 36.42 | New entry |
| SAD | Hari Singh | 28,611 | 22.39 | ▼39.13 |
| SAD(M) | Surjit Singh Kalabula | 1,405 | 1.10 | ▼5.77 |
| BSP | Bhola Singh | 1,390 | 1.09 | New entry |
| NOTA | None of the Above | 662 | 0.52 | |
| Independent | Tarsem Kumar | 474 | 0.37 | New entry |
| Margin of victory | | 2,811 | 2.19 | |
| Total valid votes | | 1,28,425 | 81.04 | |
| Rejected ballots | | 315 | | |
| Turnout | | 1,28,740 | 81.23 | |
| Registered electors | | 1,58,479 | | |
| INC gain from SAD | | Swing | | |

=== 2015 Bye election ===
2015 Punjab Legislative Assembly Bye election : Dhuri
| Party | Candidate | Votes | % | ±% |
|---|---|---|---|---|
| SAD | Gobind Singh Longowal | 67,596 | 61.52 | ▲26.92 |
| INC | Simarpratap Singh | 30,095 | 27.39 | ▼18.26 |
| SAD(A) | Surjit Singh Kalabula | 7,554 | 6.87 | New entry |
| CPI | Sukhdev Ram Sharma | 1,933 | 1.76 | New entry |
| NOTA | None of the above | 1,071 | | |
| Independent | Bikram Kumar | 835 | 0.76 | New entry |
| Independent | Ranjit Singh Bhasin | 535 | 0.49 | New entry |
| Independent | Gurmeet Singh | 397 | 0.36 | New entry |
| Independent | Sarabjit Singh | 261 | 0.24 | New entry |
| Jai Jawan Jai Kisan Party | Manjit Kaur | 203 | 0.18 | New entry |
| Independent | Jora Singh | 174 | 0.16 | New entry |
| Independent | Rattan Lal | 163 | 0.15 | ▼0.90 |
| Independent | Gurpreet Singh | 134 | 0.12 | New entry |
| Margin of victory | | 37,501 | | |
| Total valid votes | | 1,10,951 | | |
| Rejected ballots | | 0 | | |
| Turnout | | 1,10,951 | | |
| Registered electors | | 1,51,952 | | |
| SAD gain from INC | | Swing | | |

=== 2012 ===
2012 Punjab Legislative Assembly election : Dhuri
| Party | Candidate | Votes | % | ±% |
|---|---|---|---|---|
| INC | Arvind Khanna | 51,536 | 45.65 | ▲16.56 |
| SAD | Gobind Singh Longowal | 39,063 | 34.60 | ▲12.85 |
| PPoP | Gaganjit Singh | 15,682 | 13.89 | New entry |
| BSP | Baljeet Kaur | 4,155 | 3.68 | ▼7.81 |
| Independent | Rattan Lal | 1,190 | 1.05 | New entry |
| Independent | Ranjit Singh | 461 | 0.41 | New entry |
| Independent | Didar Singh | 432 | 0.38 | New entry |
| LJP | Amar Singh | 383 | 0.34 | ▼0.14 |
| Margin of victory | | 12,473 | 11.05 | |
| Total valid votes | | 1,12,902 | 81.54 | |
| Rejected ballots | | 61 | | |
| Turnout | | 1,12,963 | 81.58 | |
| Registered electors | | 1,38,461 | | |
| INC gain from Independent | | Swing | | |

=== 2007 ===
2007 Punjab Legislative Assembly election : Dhuri
| Party | Candidate | Votes | % | ±% |
|---|---|---|---|---|
| Independent | Iqbal Singh Jhundan | 36,469 | 31.87 | New entry |
| INC | Mai Roop Kaur | 33,290 | 29.09 | New entry |
| SAD | Gaganjit Singh Barnala | 24,887 | 21.75 | ▼4.82 |
| BSP | Dhanwant Singh | 13,150 | 11.49 | ▲2.78 |
| CPI | Maninder Singh | 2,627 | 2.30 | ▼7.78 |
| SAD(M) | Karnail Singh | 1,112 | 0.97 | ▼23.98 |
| Independent | Lachhaman Singh | 714 | 0.62 | New entry |
| LJP | Amar Singh | 549 | 0.48 | New entry |
| Independent | Mohd. Samsad | 415 | 0.36 | New entry |
| Independent | Iqbal Singh | 361 | 0.32 | New entry |
| Independent | Rajinder Singh | 326 | 0.28 | New entry |
| Independent | Baljeet Singh | 324 | 0.28 | New entry |
| Independent | Manjinder Singh | 205 | 0.18 | New entry |
| Margin of victory | | 3,179 | 2.78 | |
| Total valid votes | | 1,14,429 | | |
| Rejected ballots | | 35 | | |
| Turnout | | 1,14,464 | | |
| Registered electors | | 1,38,315 | | |
| Independent gain from SAD | | Swing | | |

=== 2002 ===
2002 Punjab Legislative Assembly election : Dhuri
| Party | Candidate | Votes | % | ±% |
|---|---|---|---|---|
| SAD | Gaganjit Singh | 25,538 | 26.57 | ▼0.71 |
| SAD(M) | Iqbal Singh | 23,979 | 24.95 | New entry |
| Independent | Dhanwant Singh | 22,030 | 22.92 | ▼8.34 |
| CPI | Achhra Singh | 9,686 | 10.08 | ▼1.08 |
| BSP | Sultan Begum | 8,368 | 8.71 | ▼2.95 |
| NCP | Rajwant Singh | 4,722 | 4.91 | New entry |
| LBP | Baldev Singh | 1,363 | 1.42 | New entry |
| Independent | Jaswinder Singh | 425 | 0.44 | New entry |
| Margin of victory | | 1,559 | 1.62 | |
| Total valid votes | | 96,111 | | |
| Rejected ballots | | 0 | | |
| Turnout | | 96,111 | 72.38 | |
| Registered electors | | 1,32,793 | | |
| SAD gain from Independent | | Swing | | |

=== 1997 ===
1997 Punjab Legislative Assembly election : Dhuri
| Party | Candidate | Votes | % | ±% |
|---|---|---|---|---|
| Independent | Dhanwant Singh | 28,988 | 31.26 | New entry |
| SAD | Surinder Singh | 25,297 | 27.28 | ▲12.98 |
| Independent | Manpreet Singh | 15,626 | 16.85 | New entry |
| BSP | Bhola | 10,814 | 11.66 | ▲8.12 |
| CPI | Bhan Singh Bhaura | 10,353 | 11.16 | ▼11.16 |
| Independent | Sukhpal Singh | 836 | 0.90 | New entry |
| Independent | Mohan Lal | 466 | 0.50 | New entry |
| Independent | Gian Singh | 360 | 0.39 | New entry |
| Margin of victory | | 3,691 | 3.98 | |
| Total valid votes | | 92,740 | | |
| Rejected ballots | | 4,041 | 4.18 | |
| Turnout | | 96,781 | 76.60 | |
| Registered electors | | 1,26,343 | | |
| Independent gain from INC | | Swing | | |

=== 1992 ===
1992 Punjab Legislative Assembly election : Dhuri
| Party | Candidate | Votes | % | ±% |
|---|---|---|---|---|
| INC | Dhanwant Singh | 4,164 | 35.21 | ▼0.89 |
| CPI | Bhan Singh Bhaura | 2,640 | 22.32 | New entry |
| Independent | Amar Nath | 1,941 | 16.41 | New entry |
| SAD | Surinder Singh | 1,691 | 14.30 | ▼37.91 |
| JD | Amanjit Singh | 796 | 6.73 | New entry |
| BSP | Bachan Singh Dhadhogal | 419 | 3.54 | New entry |
| Independent | Prem Kumar | 134 | 1.13 | New entry |
| Independent | Gurchetan Singh | 42 | 0.36 | New entry |
| Margin of victory | | 1,524 | 12.89 | |
| Total valid votes | | 11,827 | | |
| Rejected ballots | | 754 | 5.99 | |
| Turnout | | 12,581 | 11.02 | |
| Registered electors | | 1,14,120 | | |
| INC gain from SAD | | Swing | | |

=== 1985 ===
1985 Punjab Legislative Assembly election : Dhuri
| Party | Candidate | Votes | % | ±% |
|---|---|---|---|---|
| SAD | Surinder Singh | 36,685 | 52.21 | ▲5.17 |
| INC | Man Singh | 25,365 | 36.10 | ▼4.44 |
| Independent | Jujhar Singh | 5,302 | 7.55 | New entry |
| Independent | Amarjit Singh | 2,101 | 2.99 | New entry |
| Independent | Kamlesh Singh | 812 | 1.16 | New entry |
| Margin of victory | | 11,320 | 16.11 | |
| Total valid votes | | 70,265 | | |
| Rejected ballots | | 2,767 | 3.79 | |
| Turnout | | 73,032 | 75.90 | |
| Registered electors | | 96,222 | | |
| SAD hold | | Swing | | |

=== 1980 ===
1980 Punjab Legislative Assembly election : Dhuri
| Party | Candidate | Votes | % | ±% |
|---|---|---|---|---|
| SAD | Sant Singh | 27,008 | 47.04 | ▼10.69 |
| INC(I) | Man Singh | 23275 | 40.54 | New entry |
| Independent | Gurbachan Singh | 5,011 | 8.73 | New entry |
| JP(S) | Mohinder Singh | 1,114 | 1.94 | New entry |
| JP | Parkash Singh | 491 | 0.86 | New entry |
| Independent | Balaki Ram | 277 | 0.48 | New entry |
| Independent | Polo Ram | 237 | 0.41 | New entry |
| Margin of victory | | 3,733 | 6.50 | |
| Total valid votes | | 57,413 | | |
| Rejected ballots | | 985 | 1.69 | |
| Turnout | | 58,398 | 67.54 | |
| Registered electors | | 86,464 | | |
| SAD hold | | Swing | | |

=== 1977 ===
1977 Punjab Legislative Assembly election : Dhuri
| Party | Candidate | Votes | % | ±% |
|---|---|---|---|---|
| SAD | Sant Singh | 30,433 | 57.73 | ▲15.71 |
| CPI | Achhra Singh | 21,081 | 39.99 | ▼7.48 |
| Independent | Anand Dev | 635 | 1.20 | New entry |
| RPI | Kartar Singh | 389 | 0.74 | New entry |
| Independent | Balwant Singh | 179 | 0.34 | New entry |
| Margin of victory | | 9,352 | 17.74 | |
| Total valid votes | | 52,717 | | |
| Rejected ballots | | 662 | 1.24 | |
| Turnout | | 53,379 | 69.18 | |
| Registered electors | | 77,164 | | |
| SAD gain from CPI | | Swing | | |

=== 1972 ===
1972 Punjab Legislative Assembly election : Dhuri
| Party | Candidate | Votes | % | ±% |
|---|---|---|---|---|
| CPI | Achhra Singh | 23,165 | 47.47 | New entry |
| SAD | Sant Singh | 20,505 | 42.02 | New entry |
| Independent | Kartar Singh | 2,803 | 5.74 | ▼9.55 |
| INC(O) | Parkash Singh | 669 | 1.37 | ▼39.65 |
| Independent | Sadhu Singh | 574 | 1.18 | New entry |
| Independent | Bachan Kaur | 538 | 1.10 | New entry |
| Independent | Raksha Paul Kaur | 349 | 0.72 | New entry |
| Independent | Bachan Singh | 192 | 0.39 | New entry |
| Margin of victory | | 2,660 | 5.45 | |
| Total valid votes | | 48,795 | | |
| Rejected ballots | | 1,189 | 2.38 | |
| Turnout | | 49,984 | 77.39 | |
| Registered electors | | 64,583 | | |
| CPI gain from INC | | Swing | | |

=== 1969 ===
1969 Punjab Legislative Assembly election : Dhuri
| Party | Candidate | Votes | % | ±% |
|---|---|---|---|---|
| INC | Sant Singh | 17,926 | 41.02 | ▼4.07 |
| CPI(M) | Harnam Singh | 17,510 | 40.07 | ▼1.80 |
| Independent | Kartar Singh | 6,683 | 15.29 | New entry |
| Independent | Yog Raj Goel | 1,583 | 3.62 | New entry |
| Margin of victory | | 416 | 0.95 | |
| Total valid votes | | 43,702 | | |
| Rejected ballots | | 1,549 | 3.42 | |
| Turnout | | 45,251 | 75.04 | |
| Registered electors | | 60,304 | | |
| INC hold | | Swing | | |

=== 1967 ===
1967 Punjab Legislative Assembly election : Dhuri
| Party | Candidate | Votes | % | ±% |
|---|---|---|---|---|
| INC | T. Singh | 17,829 | 45.09 | ▲11.32 |
| CPI(M) | J. Singh | 16,556 | 41.87 | New entry |
| ABJS | P. Singh | 4,380 | 11.08 | New entry |
| Akali Dal (MTS) | P. Singh | 773 | 1.96 | New entry |
| Margin of victory | | 1,273 | 3.22 | |
| Total valid votes | | 39,538 | | |
| Rejected ballots | | 2,260 | 5.41 | |
| Turnout | | 41,798 | 73.99 | |
| Registered electors | | 56,489 | | |
| INC gain from CPI | | Swing | | |

=== 1962 ===
1962 Punjab Legislative Assembly election : Dhuri
| Party | Candidate | Votes | % | ±% |
|---|---|---|---|---|
| CPI | Bhan Singh | 20,658 | 49.08 | ▲27.67 |
| INC | Lehna Singh | 14,212 | 33.77 | ▲9.36 |
| ABJS | Gujjar Singh | 3,389 | 8.05 | New entry |
| SWA | Teja Singh | 1,587 | 3.77 | New entry |
| Independent | Bachan Singh | 1,329 | 3.16 | New entry |
| Independent | Gokal Singh | 915 | 2.17 | New entry |
| Margin of victory | | 6,446 | 15.31 | |
| Total valid votes | | 42,090 | | |
| Rejected ballots | | 2,741 | 6.11 | |
| Turnout | | 44,831 | 64.84 | |
| Registered electors | | 69,141 | | |
| CPI gain from INC | | Swing | (Note: Seat 1 gained from INC by CPI;Two member constituencies were abolished) | |

=== 1957 ===
1957 Punjab Legislative Assembly election : Dhuri
| Party | Candidate | Votes | % | ±% |
|---|---|---|---|---|
| INC | Jasdev Singh | 27,628 | 24.41 | |
| CPI | Jangir Singh | 24,226 | 21.41 | |
| CPI | Harnam Singh | 22,850 | 20.19 | |
| INC | Lehna Singh | 22,226 | 19.64 | |
| Independent | Gujjar Singh | 8,477 | 7.49 | |
| Independent | Kartar Singh | 4,157 | 3.67 | |
| Independent | Mali Singh | 3,610 | 3.19 | |
| Margin of victory | | | | |
| Total valid votes | | 1,13,174 | 47.73 | |
| Rejected ballots | | | | |
| Turnout | | 1,13,174 | 95.46 | |
| Registered electors | | 1,18,555 | | |
| INC hold | | Swing | | |
| CPI gain from INC | | Swing | (Note: Seat 2 CPI gain from INC; Seat 1 INC hold) | |

=== 1954 ===
1954 Patiala and East Punjab States Union Legislative Assembly election : Dhuri
| Party | Candidate | Votes | % | ±% |
|---|---|---|---|---|
| INC | Lehna Singh | 14,656 | 20.69 | |
| INC | Parduman Singh | 14,276 | 20.16% | |
| Shiromani Akali Dal (Mann Group) | Pritam Singh | 12,473 | 17.61 | |
| Shiromani Akali Dal (Mann Group) | Sarwan Singh | 11,619 | 16.40 | |
| Shiromani Akali Dal (Raman Group) | Kundan Singh | 8,602 | 12.15 | |
| Shiromani Akali Dal (Raman Group) | Bachitar Singh | 7,674 | 10.83 | |
| Independent | Bhagta | 816 | 1.15 | |
| Independent | Tulsi | 711 | 1.00 | |
| Margin of victory | | | | |
| Total valid votes | | 70,827 | 57.76 | |
| Rejected ballots | | 0 | | |
| Turnout | | 70,827 | 115.52 | |
| Registered electors | | 61,312 | | |
| INC hold | | Swing | (Note: Seat 1 hold; Seat 2 new seat win) | |
| INC win (new seat) | | | | |

=== 1952 ===
1952 Patiala and East Punjab States Union Legislative Assembly election : Dhuri
| Party | Candidate | Votes | % | ±% |
|---|---|---|---|---|
| INC | Tirath Singh | 8,642 | 45.15 | |
| Akali Dal | Sarwan Singh | 8,028 | 41.94 | |
| FBL(M) | Kartar Singh | 1,561 | 8.16 | |
| Independent | Gurdev Singh | 636 | 3.32 | |
| Independent | Rajinder Paul | 274 | 1.43 | |
| Margin of victory | | 614 | 3.21 | |
| Total valid votes | | 19,141 | | |
| Rejected ballots | | 0 | | |
| Turnout | | 19,141 | 69.95 | |
| Registered electors | | 27,363 | | |
| INC win (new seat) | | | | |
