= Arjan Singh Chahal =

Sardar Bahadur Arjan Singh Chahal CIE

Sarbarah
- In office 1890–1896
- Preceded by: Man Singh Waraich
- Succeeded by: Jawala Singh

Personal details
- Born: 1839 Chahal, Amritsar, Punjab
- Died: 1908
- Parent: Javala Singh (father)

Sardar Bahadur Arjan Singh Chahal CIE (1839–1908) was a Sikh honorary magistrate and civil judge who served as the manager of Darbar Sahib and the Akal Takht, as a sarbarah appointed by the British Raj from 1890 to 1896.

== Early life ==
Arjan Singh Chahal was born in village Chahal, Amritsar, British India to a Jat Sikh family of Chahal clan in 1839. He was seven when his father Javala Singh died in 1846. He held large jagirs in the Tarn Taran tehsil and in the Lyallpur District, present day Punjab, Pakistan.

== Sarbarah ==
From 1890 to 1896, Chahal served as the British Deputy Commissioner of Amritsar appointed sarbarah of Darbar Sahib and the Akal Takht. He was appointed president of the 11-member lighting committee set up in 1896 to arrange the installation of electricity in the Darbar Sahib complex.

== Honours ==
He received the title of Sardar Bahadur in 1894, and was made a Companion of the Indian Empire in 1906.

== Death ==
Arjan Singh died at the age of 69 in January 1908.
