= Tarlochan Singh Tur =

Indian politician

Member of Parliament, Lok Sabha
- In office 1984-1989
- Preceded by: Lehna Singh Tur
- Succeeded by: Simranjit Singh Mann
- In office 1998-2004
- Preceded by: Major Singh Uboke
- Succeeded by: Rattan Singh Ajnala
- Constituency: Tarn Taran, Punjab

Personal details
- Born: 15 February 1947 Tur Village, Amritsar District Punjab, British India
- Died: 2016
- Party: Akali Dal
- Spouse: Parmjeet Kaur Tur

Tarlochan Singh Tur (15 February 1947 – 2016) was an Indian politician. He was elected to the Lok Sabha, the lower house of the Parliament of India, from the Tarn Taran constituency of Punjab as a member of the Shiromani Akali Dal.
