= Amargarh Assembly constituency =

Legislative Assembly constituency in Punjab State, India

Coordinates: 30.46°N 76.01°E

Amargarh
- Constituency No. 106 for the Punjab Legislative Assembly

Constituency details
- Country: India
- State: Punjab
- District: Malerkotla
- Lok Sabha constituency: Fatehgarh Sahib
- Established: 2008
- Total electors: 165,909 (in 2022)
- Reservation: None

Member of Legislative Assembly
- 16th Punjab Legislative Assembly
- Incumbent Jaswant Singh Gajjanmajra
- Party: Aam Aadmi Party
- Elected year: 2022

Amargarh Assembly constituency (Sl. No.: 106) is a Punjab Legislative Assembly constituency in Malerkotla district, Punjab state, India.

== Members of the Legislative Assembly ==
Most Successful parties from Amargarh Vidhan Sabha
1. SAD (1 Time) (33.3%)
2. INC(1 Time) (33.3%)
3. AAP (1 Time) (33.3%)

Year	Member	Party
2012	Iqbal Singh Jhundan	Shiromani Akali Dal
2017	Surjit Singh Dhiman	Indian National Congress
2022	Jaswant Singh Gajjanmajra	Aam Aadmi Party

== Election results ==
=== 2027 ===
Punjab Assembly election, 2027: Amargarh
Party	Candidate	Votes	%	±%
AAP	Jaswant Singh Gajjan Majra			
AD (WPD)				New entry
BSP				
INC				
SAD				
BJP				New entry
NOTA	None of the above			
Majority				
Turnout				

=== 2022 ===
2022 Punjab Legislative Assembly election: Amargarh
Party	Candidate	Votes	%	±%
AAP	Jaswant Singh Gajjan Majra	44,523	34.28	▲6.67
SAD(A)	Simranjit Singh Mann	38,480	29.63	▲29.17
SAD	Iqbal Singh Jhundan	26,068	20.07	▼9.88
INC	Smit Singh	16,923	13.03	▼26.01
PLC	Sardar Ali	1,342	1.03	New entry
NOTA	None of the above	595	0.46	▼
Majority		6,043	4.65	▼
Turnout		129,868	77.95	
Registered electors		165,909		
AAP gain from INC				

=== 2017 ===
2017 Punjab Legislative Assembly election: Amargarh
Party	Candidate	Votes	%	±%
INC	Surjit Dhiman	50,994	39.04	▲9.67
SAD	Iqbal Singh Jhundan	39,115	29.95	▼3.19
AAP	Jaswant Singh Gajjanmajra	36,063	27.61	New entry
CPI	Pritam Singh	696	0.53	New entry
SAD(A)	Karnail Singh	600	0.46	▲0.19
NOTA	None of the above	850	0.65	
Majority		11,879	9.03	
Turnout		131,553	84.19	
Registered electors		156,256		
INC gain from SAD				

=== 2012 ===
2012 Punjab Legislative Assembly election: Amargarh
Party	Candidate	Votes	%	±%
SAD	Iqbal Singh Jhundan	38,915	33.14	New entry
INC	Surjit Singh Dhiman	34489	29.37	New entry
PPoP	Ajit Singh Chandurain	23,347	19.88	New entry
BSP	Mohd Arshad	6,985	5.95	New entry
Independent	Rajnish Sharma	5,992	5.10	New entry
SAD(A)	Amrik Singh	312	0.27	New entry
Majority		4,426	3.77	
Turnout		117,435	85.26	
Registered electors				

== See also ==
- Punjab Legislative Assembly
