= Surjit Singh Barnala =

Indian politician

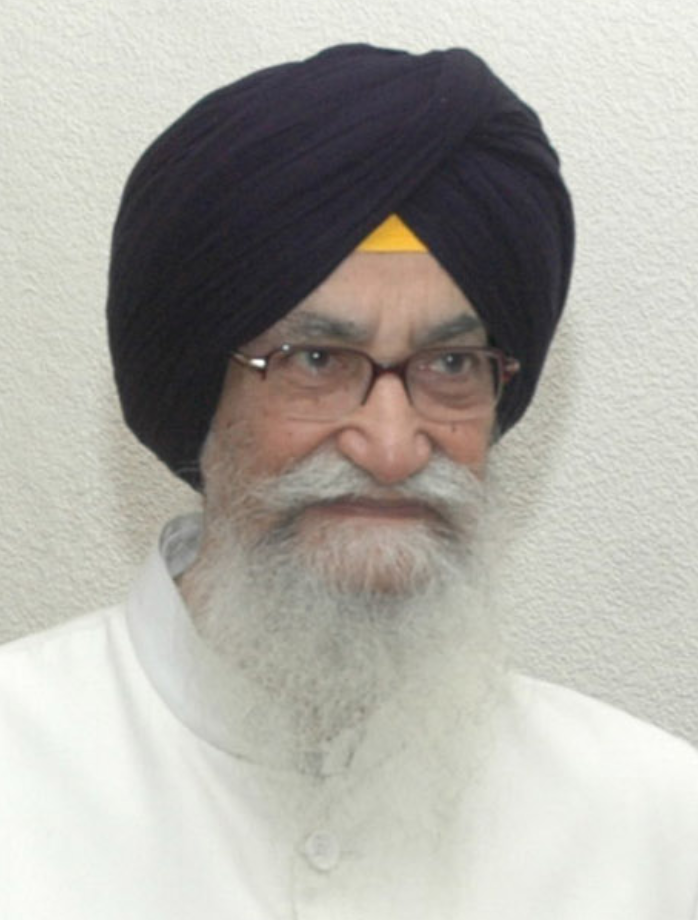

8th Governor of Tamil Nadu
- In office 3 November 2004 – 31 August 2011
- Chief Minister: J. Jayalalithaa; M. Karunanidhi
- Preceded by: P. S. Ramamohan Rao
- Succeeded by: Konijeti Rosaiah
- In office 24 May 1990 – 15 February 1991
- Chief Minister: M. Karunanidhi
- Preceded by: P. C. Alexander
- Succeeded by: Bhishma Narain Singh

Lieutenant Governor of Puducherry
- Additional Charge (Note: As administrator of Puducherry)
- In office 9 April 2009 – 27 July 2009
- Chief Minister: V. Vaithilingam
- Preceded by: Govind Singh Gurjar
- Succeeded by: Iqbal Singh

17th Governor of Andhra Pradesh
- In office 3 January 2003 – 4 November 2004
- Chief Minister: N. Chandrababu Naidu; Y. S. Rajasekhara Reddy
- Preceded by: C. Rangarajan
- Succeeded by: Sushilkumar Shinde

1st Governor of Uttarakhand
- In office 9 November 2000 – 7 January 2003
- Chief Minister: Nityanand Swami; Bhagat Singh Koshyari; N. D. Tiwari
- Preceded by: Office Established
- Succeeded by: Sudarshan Agarwal

5th Minister of Chemicals and Fertilizers
- In office 19 March 1998 – 13 October 1999
- Prime Minister: Atal Bihari Vajpayee
- Preceded by: M. Arunachalam
- Succeeded by: Suresh Prabhu

5th Lieutenant Governor of the Andaman and Nicobar Islands
- In office 14 December 1990 – 18 March 1993
- Preceded by: Ranjit Singh Dyal
- Succeeded by: Vakkom Purushothaman

11th Chief Minister of Punjab
- In office 29 September 1985 – 11 June 1987
- Preceded by: Darbara Singh
- Succeeded by: Beant Singh

12th Union Minister of Agriculture and Irrigation
- In office 18 June 1977 – 28 July 1979
- Prime Minister: Morarji Desai
- Preceded by: Parkash Singh Badal
- Succeeded by: Brahm Prakash

Member of Parliament Lok Sabha
- In office 10 May 1996 – 26 April 1999
- Preceded by: Gurcharan Singh Dadhahoor
- Succeeded by: Simranjit Singh Mann
- Constituency: Sangrur

Governor of Odisha(additional charge)
- In office 4 March 2003 – 13 Nov 2003
- Preceded by: M. M. Rajendran
- Succeeded by: M. M. Rajendran

Personal details
- Born: 21 October 1925 Ateli, Punjab, British India (present-day Haryana, India)
- Died: 14 January 2017 (aged 91) Chandigarh, India
- Party: Shiromani Akali Dal
- Spouse: Surjit Kaur Barnala
- Children: 4

Surjit Singh Barnala (21 October 1925 – 14 January 2017) was an Indian politician who served as the 11th chief minister of Punjab state from 1985 to 1987. Following that he served as the governor of Tamil Nadu, Uttarakhand, Andhra Pradesh, lieutenant governor of Andaman and Nicobar Islands and a Union Minister on handling various portfolios.

== Early life ==
Barnala was born in Begpur Village in Ateli Tehsil, Haryana. Born of a well-to-do family (his father was a magistrate), Barnala passed law from Lucknow University in 1945. In Lucknow, he was involved in the Quit India Movement of 1942. Subsequently, he practised law for some years, and became politically active in the late 1960s, rising through the ranks of Akali Dal. Though, he first stood for election in 1952 but lost by a meagre 4 votes.

== Politics ==
Barnala's first ministerial assignment was in 1969 when he has sworn in as education minister in the Justice Gurnam Singh Government and was instrumental in setting up the Guru Nanak Dev University in Amritsar.

In 1977 he was elected to the Indian Parliament and was inducted in the Morarji Desai Cabinet as the agriculture minister at the time when the ministry included Irrigation Water Resources, Food, Environment and Forests, Consumer Affairs, Power and Chemical And Fertilizers and Rural Development. In 1978, Barnala signed the historic Ganga Waters Agreement (Farakka Agreement) with Bangladesh.

In 1979, during the turmoil in the national government when PM Morarji Desai resigned, the then-president Neelam Sanjiva Reddy toyed with the idea of appointing an interim government with Barnala as prime minister but had to drop the idea at the last moment, fearing horse-trading by a top member of the Cabinet, and Deputy Prime Minister Chaudhary Charan Singh assumed prime ministership.

Barnala served as chief minister of Punjab from 29 September 1985 until 11 May 1987. Barnala, a member of the Sikh political party Shiromani Akali Dal (Longowal), served as chief minister during a period of Sikh militant movement in Punjab. The state had under in Barnala's chief ministership from 1985 to 1987, and after nearly two years in office, President's Rule was imposed.

In 1996, Barnala once again came close to becoming prime minister as in the 1996 Indian general election, with no political party getting a mandate, it was a good time for a regional party to have its prime minister. Regional parties accounted for about 80 MPs in the Lok Sabha. The Asom Gana Parishad of Prafulla Kumar Mahanta and Telugu Desam Party of Chandra Babu Naidu, including The Left parties, zeroed on Barnala, but at the last minute Barnala's parent party Shiromani Akali Dal led by Barnala's supposedly close friend Parkash Singh Badal without informing Barnala joined hands with the Bharatiya Janata Party hence Barnala yet again missed being Prime Minister.

In 1997, Barnala was a candidate of the BJP and its allies in the election of the vice-president of India.

In 1998, Barnala was again elected to Parliament and became the minister for Chemical & Fertilizers and Food & Consumer Affairs in the Vajpayee Cabinet.

At the time of his death, he was the patron of a four-party alliance Sanja Morcha in Punjab. Like few other anti-Congress leaders of his time, he has spent about three and a half years in jail as a political prisoner, including 11 months in solitary confinement.

== Governorship ==
Since then, Barnala has served as a governor of several states. He first served as governor of Tamil Nadu from 1990 to 1991 for about nine months. Barnala refused to recommend the dismissal of the Tamil Nadu government, and when he was later transferred as governor of Bihar he chose to resign. He served as the lieutenant governor of Andaman and Nicobar Islands from December 1990 to 18 March 1993.

He was the first governor of Uttarakhand from its creation in 2000 until 2003, and governor of Andhra Pradesh from 2003 to 2004. During this time he also held additional charge of Orissa as governor for some time and was governor of Tamil Nadu until 31 August 2011 during his Tamil Nadu years. He also held additional charge of Puduchery for a few months. He is the second longest-serving governor in Indian history after Dr. A. R. Kidwai and the only governor to have served three terms in the history of Tamil Nadu State of 300 years.

== Author and painter ==
In 1996, Barnala authored a book, Story of an Escape, about his experiences of living a disguised life in various locations of India. His other book released in December 2007 is titled My Other Two Daughters and has been transliterated in braille by Kunwar Singh Negi.

Barnala painted landscapes and political portraits, many of which are on display in the official residences he occupied in his various tenures. His paintings have also been sold in various fund raisers.

== Personal life ==
Surjit Singh Barnala was married to Surjit Kaur Barnala, who is also an active politician. In August 2009, Surjit Kaur become the President of the Shiromani Akali Dal (Longowal). The couple had three sons and a daughter. The eldest son, Jasjit Barnala, is not actively involved in politics and is a businessman. Their second son, Gaganjit is a politician. His youngest son, NeilInder, died in a road accident in 1996 and daughter, Amrit, in 2012 of cancer. He has 8 grandchildren varying from 37 years to 17 years old.

== Death ==
Barnala died at PGIMER hospital, Chandigarh, following a prolonged illness, on 14 January 2017, aged 91. He was admitted to the hospital on 12 January.

== Notes ==
Lok Sabha
Preceded by Teja Singh Swatantra	Member of Parliament for Sangrur; 1977 – 1980	Succeeded by Gurcharan Singh Nihalsinghwala
Preceded by Gurcharan Singh Dadhahoor	Member of Parliament for Sangrur; 1996 – 1999	Succeeded by Simranjit Singh Mann
Political offices
Preceded by Parkash Singh Badal	Minister of Agriculture; 1977 – 1979	Succeeded by Rao Birender Singh
Preceded by President's rule	Chief Minister of Punjab (India); 29 September 1985 – 11 June 1987	Succeeded by President's rule
Preceded by P. C. Alexander	Governor of Tamil Nadu; 24 May 1990 – 15 February 1991	Succeeded by Bhishma Narain Singh
Preceded by Lt Gen Ranjit Singh Dayal (Retd)	Lt Governor of Andaman and Nicobar Islands; December 1990 – March 1993	Succeeded by Vakkom Purushothaman
Preceded by M. Arunachalam	Minister of Chemicals and Fertilizers; 1998 – 1999	Succeeded by Suresh Prabhu
Preceded by Raghuvansh Prasad Singh	Minister of Consumer Affairs, Food and Public Distribution; 1998 – 1999	Succeeded by Shanta Kumar
Preceded by None; State Created	Governor of Uttarakhand; 9 November 2000 – 7 January 2003	Succeeded by Sudarshan Agarwal
Preceded by C. Rangarajan	Governor of Andhra Pradesh; 3 January 2003 – 4 November 2004	Succeeded by Sushilkumar Shinde
Preceded by P. S. Ramamohan Rao	Governor of Tamil Nadu; 3 November 2004 – 31 August 2011	Succeeded by Konijeti Rosaiah
