= Adesh Partap Singh Kairon =

Indian politician

Adesh Pratap Singh Kairon
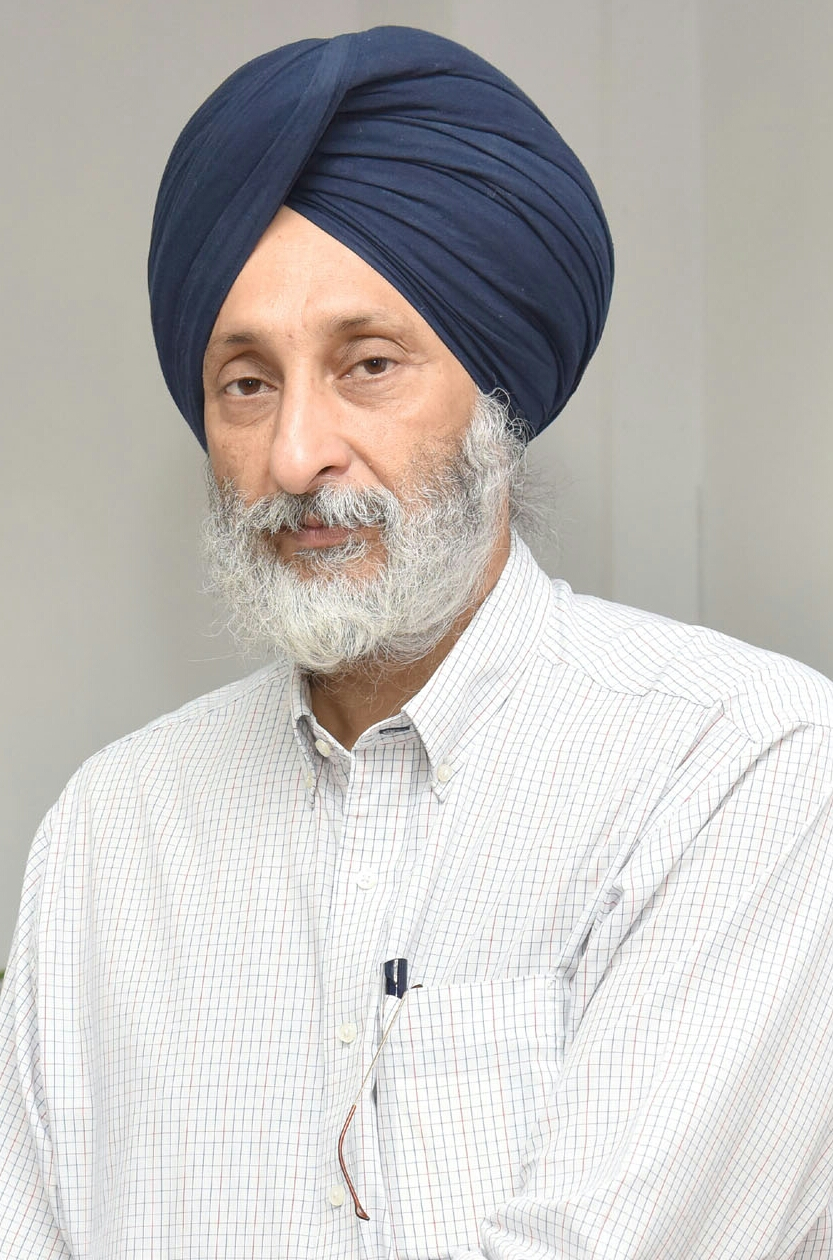

Member of Punjab Legislative Assembly
- In office 1997–2017
- Preceded by: Sakhwinder Singh
- Succeeded by: Harminder Singh Gill
- Constituency: Patti

Personal details
- Born: 26 February 1959 (age 67) Amritsar, Punjab, India
- Party: Shiromani Akali Dal
- Spouse: Parneet Kaur
- Parent(s): Surinder Singh Kairon and Kusum Kumari
- Education: Punjab Engineering College, Kellogg School of Management

Adesh Pratap Singh Kairon (born 26 February 1959) is a politician from Punjab, India. He was born in a Dhillon Jatt Sikh family. He is a four-time Member of Legislative Assembly in the Punjab Legislative Assembly from the Patti Constituency. He has served thrice as a minister. He has held the portfolios of Excise and Taxation, Food and IT.

Kairon belongs to the Kairon political family and was the longest served minister in the state of Punjab. He is the great-grandson of Nihal Singh Kairon, grandson of Pratap Singh Kairon, son of Surinder Singh Kairon, son-in-law of Parkash Singh Badal and brother-in-law of Sukhbir Singh Badal. He is also a nephew (by marriage) of Harcharan Singh Brar.

Kairon holds a BE degree from Punjab Engineering College and an MBA from Northwestern University's Kellogg School of Management. He has two sons, Dilsher and Jayant Singh.

Kairon was expelled from Shiromani Akali Dal on May 25, 2024 due to participating in anti-party actions. The decision was taken after Virsa Singh Valtoha made a complaint against Kairon.
