= Surinder Singh Kairon =

Indian politician

Sardar Surinder Singh Kairon

Member of Parliament, India
- In office 1991-1996
- Preceded by: Simranjit Singh Mann
- Succeeded by: Major Singh Uboke
- Constituency: Tarn Taran

Personal details
- Born: 8 December 1927 Kairon, Punjab, British India
- Died: 16 March 2009 (aged 81) Amritsar, Punjab, India
- Party: Indian National Congress
- Spouse: Kusum Kumari
- Children: 3 sons Adesh Partap Singh Kairon; Gurpartap Singh Kairon; Uday Singh Kairon

Surinder Singh Kairon (8 December 1927 – 16 March 2009) was an Indian politician from Punjab. He was a member of Indian National Congress and represented Taran Taran in 10th Lok Sabha. He was son of ex-chief minister of Punjab, Partap Singh Kairon. He was a member of Punjab Vidhan Sabha before being elected to the Lok Sabha. His son Adesh Partap Singh Kairon is married to Parkash Singh Badal's daughter Preneet Kaur. Surinder Kairon died after suffering a massive cardiac arrest in Amritsar on 16 March 2009.

== Early life ==
Surinder Singh Kairon was the son of ex-chief minister of Punjab, Pratap Singh Kairon. He was born on 8 December 1927 at Kairon Amritsar district. He has done a B.Sc.(Hons) and M.A. from Panjab University, Chandigarh.

== Political career ==
Kairon was a prominent political leader in Punjab and was considered a stalwart leader in the Majha area of Punjab. He was elected for Punjab Vidhan Sabha three times. In 1991, he became a member of 10th Lok Sabha and represented Tarn Taran.

== Personal life ==
Kairon was married to Kusum Kumari. The couple had 3 sons, Adesh Partap Singh Kairon, Gurpartap Singh Kairon and Uday Singh Kairon. Adesh Partap is an Ex-Minister of Food and Civil Supplies and IT in Punjab Government.

== Death ==
Kairon died after suffering a massive cardiac arrest in Amritsar on 16 March 2009. He had suddenly collapsed after a regular evening walk. He was cremated in his native village Kairon.
