= Kairon =

Village in Punjab, India

- Village
- Location in Punjab, India Kairon (India)
- Coordinates: 31°20′N 74°52′E
- Country: India
- State: Punjab
- District: Tarn Taran

Languages
  - Official: Punjabi
- Time zone: UTC+5:30 (IST)
- 01851: 01851
- ISO 3166 code: IN-PB
- Vehicle registration: PB 46
- patti: Tarn Taran
- Vidhan Sabha constituency: Patti
- Climate: Sub Tropical (Köppen)

Kairon is an Indian village in the district of Tarn-Taran, located in the northwest of Punjab. The village is home to a majority of Dhillon Jatt Sikhs.

The village Kairon has a population of 13,000 and draws its fame for being the home village of the Kairon political family. The family has produced political leaders such as Nihal Singh Kairon, Pratap Singh Kairon, Jaswant Singh Kairon, Surinder Singh Kairon, Gurinder Singh Kairon and Adesh Pratap Singh Kairon.

Currently, Adesh Pratap Singh Kairon who is married to the daughter of Parkash Singh Badal is the head of the family. He has been thrice a minister under the chief ministership of his father-in-law Parkash Singh Badal.

== Notable people ==
- Adesh Pratap Singh Kairon (born 1959) is a politician from Punjab. He is the great-grandson of Nihal Singh Kairon, grandson of Partap Singh Kairon, son of Surinder Singh Kairon, son-in-law of Parkash Singh Badal, nephew of Harcharan Singh Brar and the current head of the Kairon family.
- Surinder Singh Kairon (1934–2009) was the son of late Sardar Partap Singh Kairon. He was a member of Punjab Vidha Sabha before being elected to the Parliament representing the Congress Party.
- Partap Singh Kairon (1901–1965) was the Chief Minister of the Punjab province (then comprising Punjab, Haryana and Himachal Pradesh), and is widely acknowledged as the architect of post-Independence Punjab Province (Punjab, Haryana and Himachal today). He was jailed twice by the British Empire, once for five years for organizing protests against British rule. His political influence and views are still considered to dominate Punjabi politics.
