= Dalvir Singh Khangura =

Indian politician

Member of the Legislative Assembly
- In office 2017–2022
- Governor: V.P. Singh Badnore
- Preceded by: Gobind Singh Longowal
- Succeeded by: Bhagwant Mann
- Constituency: Dhuri Assembly constituency

Personal details
- Born: Punjab, India
- Party: Indian National Congress (till 2024, 2025 - present); Aam Aadmi Party (2024 - 2025)

Dalvir Singh Khangura, known as "Goldy", was born on 24 September 1982 in a Jat Sikh family in Dhuri, District Sangrur, Punjab India. He has done his schooling from S.V.M., Dhuri. He later joined S.D. College, Chandigarh and did his Graduation and PGDCA, is former MLA from Dhuri, Sangrur District, Punjab. He got elected for the seat in the 2017 Punjab Legislative Assembly election. He was a politician in Indian National Congress but joined Aam Aadmi Party in May 2024 in the presence of Chief Minister Bhagwant Mann. He later left his previous party and rejoined Indian National Congressin April,2025,.

== Career ==
He contested as College Representative in S.D. College in 2002 and won. He was chosen as President of Student Union Of Panjab University (SOPU) to represent them in college elections as college president in 2003–2004.

Dalvir then joined Punjab University, Chandigarh. He became the President of Punjab University Campus Student Counsel in the year 2006–2007.

Dalvir Singh than joined Youth congress in 2007, working at various levels for Congress party since then. He is also Chairman, Panchayati Raj Sangathan (District Sangrur).

=== Member of the Legislative Assembly ===
He was then fielded as the candidate for 2017 legislative assembly elections from Dhuri, Punjab. Dalvir won the seat of MLA from Dhuri and polled 49,349 votes and won with the margin of 2838 votes from INC party. Dalvir lost in 2022 assembly election to Bhagwant Singh Mann with a whopping margin of 58206 votes. After that he lost Sangrur Lok Sabha by poll and even lost his deposit.

== Electoral Performance ==
2017 Punjab Legislative Assembly election : Dhuri
Party	Candidate	Votes	%	±%
INC	Dalvir Singh Goldy	49,347	38.62	▲11.23
AAP	Jasvir Singh Jassi Sekhon	46,536	36.42	New entry
SAD	Hari Singh	28,611	22.39	▼39.13
SAD(M)	Surjit Singh Kalabula	1,405	1.10	▼5.77
BSP	Bhola Singh	1,390	1.09	New entry
NOTA	None of the Above	662	0.52	
Independent	Tarsem Kumar	474	0.37	New entry
Margin of victory		2,811	2.19	
Total valid votes		1,28,425	81.04	
Rejected ballots		315		
Turnout		1,28,740	81.23	
Registered electors		1,58,479		
INC gain from SAD		Swing		

2022 Punjab Legislative Assembly election : Dhuri
Party	Candidate	Votes	%	±%
AAP	Bhagwant Mann	82,592	64.29	▲27.87
INC	Dalvir Singh Goldy	24,386	18.98	▼19.64
SAD	Parkash Chand Garg	6,991	5.44	▼16.95
BJP	Randeep Singh Deol	5,436	4.23	New entry
SAD(A)	Narinder Singh	4,469	3.48	▲2.38
SSM	Sarbjit Singh Alal	1,188	0.92	New entry
NOTA	None of the Above	775	0.6	
Margin of victory		58,206	45.4	
Total valid votes		128,458	77.32	
Rejected ballots		429		
Turnout		128,977	77.63	
Registered electors		166,143		
AAP gain from INC		Swing		

2022 By-election: Sangrur
Party	Candidate	Votes	%	±%
SAD(A)	Simranjit Singh Mann	253,154	35.61	▲31.24
AAP	Gurmail Singh	247,332	34.79	▼2.61
INC	Dalvir Singh Goldy	79,668	11.21	▼16.22
BJP	Kewal Singh Dhillon	66,298	9.33	New
SAD	Bibi Kamaldeep Kaur Rajoana	44,428	6.25	▼17.58
NOTA	None of the Above	2471	0.35	
Majority		6,245	0.88	
Turnout		7,10,919	45.3%	▼27.1
Registered electors		15,69,240		
SAD(A) gain from AAP		Swing	▲16.92	

== Personal life ==
Dalvir Singh is married to Simrat Khangura and has two sons.
