= Major Singh Uboke =

Indian politician (1927–2020)

Member of Parliament, Lok Sabha
- In office 1996-1998
- Preceded by: Surinder Singh Kairon
- Succeeded by: Tarlochan Singh Tur
- Constituency: Tarn Taran, Punjab

Personal details
- Born: 27 April 1927 Tur Village, Amritsar District Punjab, British India
- Died: 3 November 2020
- Party: Shiromani Akali Dal
- Spouse: Jagir Kaur

Major Singh Uboke (1927-2020) was an Indian politician. He was elected to the Lok Sabha, the lower house of the Parliament of India from the Tarn Taran constituency of Punjab as a member of the Shiromani Akali Dal.
