= Tarn Taran Lok Sabha constituency =

Former Parliamentary Constituency in Punjab, India

Coordinates: 31.46°N 74.93°E

Tarn Taran
- Former Lok Sabha constituency

Constituency details
- Country: India
- Region: North India
- State: Punjab
- Established: 1952
- Abolished: 2008

Tarn Taran was a Lok Sabha constituency in Punjab, India. This constituency was dissolved in 2009 and replaced by Khadoor Sahib.

The assembly constituencies that were part of the Lok Sabha constituency: Tarn Taran, Khem Karan, Patti and Khadur Sahib.

In 2004, Rattan Singh Ajnala won the Lok Sabha election.

== Members of Parliament ==
Most Successful parties from Tarn Taran Lok Sabha
1. SAD (8 Times) (53.3%)
2. INC (6 Times) (40.0%)
3. SAD (A) (1 Time) (6.67%)

Election	Member	Party
1952	Sardar Surjit Singh Majithia	Indian National Congress
1957	Sardar Surjit Singh Majithia	Indian National Congress
1962	Sardar Surjit Singh Majithia	Indian National Congress
1967	Gurdial Singh Dhillon	Indian National Congress
1971	Gurdial Singh Dhillon	Indian National Congress
1977	Mohan Singh Tur	Shiromani Akali Dal
1980	Lehna Singh Tur	Shiromani Akali Dal
1985	Tarlochan Singh Tur	Shiromani Akali Dal
1989	Simranjit Singh Mann	Shiromani Akali Dal (Amritsar)
1992	Surinder Singh Kairon	Indian National Congress
1996	Major Singh Uboke	Shiromani Akali Dal
1998	Prem Singh Lalpur	Shiromani Akali Dal
1998^	Tarlochan Singh Tur	Shiromani Akali Dal
1999	Tarlochan Singh Tur	Shiromani Akali Dal
2004	Rattan Singh Ajnala	Shiromani Akali Dal

^By-Poll

2008 onwards : Khadoor Sahib

== Election results ==
=== 1989 ===
1989 Indian general election: Tarn Taran
Party	Candidate	Votes	%	±%
SAD(A)	Simranjit Singh Mann	527,707	88.1	
INC	Ajit Singh Mann	47,290	7.9	
Independent	Jaltar Singh Mehlanwala	5,234	0.9	
Majority		480,417	80.2	
Turnout		599,322	63.6%	
Registered electors		942,162		
SAD(A) gain from SAD		Swing		

== See also ==
- Tarn Taran Sahib
- Khadoor Sahib Lok Sabha constituency
- List of constituencies of the Lok Sabha
