= Arur Singh Shergill =

Indian magistrate (1865 – 1926)

Sardar Bahadur Sir Arur Singh Shergill CIE KCIE
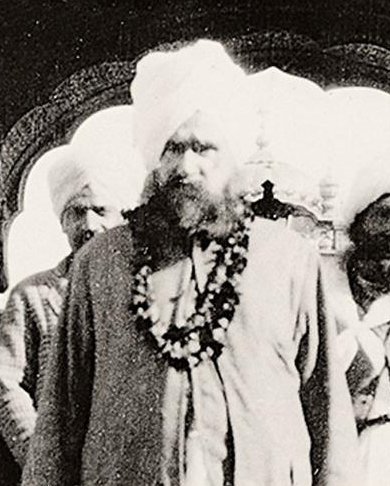
- Shergill in 1920

Sarbarah
- In office 1 July 1902 – 29 August 1920
- Preceded by: Jawala Singh
- Succeeded by: Teja Singh Bhuchar

Personal details
- Born: 1865 Naushehra Nangli, Amritsar, Punjab
- Died: 1926
- Children: Lachhman Singh; Buta Singh; Surinder Singh
- Parent: Harnam Singh (father)

Arur Singh Shergill (1865 – 1926) was a Sikh magistrate and civil judge who served as the manager of Darbar Sahib and the Akal Takht, as a sarbarah appointed by the British Raj from 1902 to 1920.

== Early life and career ==
Arur Singh Shergill was born in Naushehra Nangli, Amritsar, British India to a Sikh family of Shergill clan in 1865. His father Deputy Inspector Harnam Singh died when he was four years of age. Being a minor, his property was brought under the Court of Wards to be administered by Gulab Singh Bhagowalia and Ajit Singh Attari till 1885. He was educated at the Government High School in Amritsar.

In 1888, Shergill became an honorary magistrate of second class with powers over 133 villages of Kathu Nangal police station. Later he became a magistrate of first class in 1907 for the same district. He was also the honorary civil judge in Amritsar.

== Sarbarah ==
Shergill was appointed a sarbarah to manage Darbar Sahib and the Akal Takht on 1 July 1902. He was appointed by Esquire Maclagan, Deputy Commissioner of Amritsar, to replace Colonel Jawala Singh. Arur Singh was a aristocrat and supported the Amritsar Singh Sabha which grew out of fashion by his time.

On 2 May 1905, Shergill removed idols/images from the Darbar Sahib and prohibited the entry of Brahmins within the premises, after protests. This action was supported by the Tat Khalsa faction of the Singh Sabha movement (which Arur Singh was opposed to), however the Arya Samaj, Brahmo Samaj, and other prominent organizations contested the move. There would be a petition following the action signed by around 13,000 persons dispatched to the colonial British administration requesting that images be reinstated in the precincts of the shrine.

Subsequent to the Jallianwala Bagh massacre on 13 April 1919, Shergill honored Reginald Dyer, the general who ordered the massacre, with a siropa. He thanked Dyer for their protection of the Darbar Sahib complex. According to Mohinder Singh's The Akali Movement, Arur Singh discussed with Dyer about the possibility of him becoming a Sikh at the siropa ceremony but Dyer declined on the basis of being unable to keep long-hair as a British official and giving-up smoking cigarettes.

After being pressured by the Sikhs to resign, Shergill gave his resignation on 29 August 1920.

== Honours ==
A Companion (CIE) in 1913 and a Knight Grand Commander (GCIE) in 1921, two classes of the Order of the Indian Empire were awarded to Shergill.

== Family and legacy ==
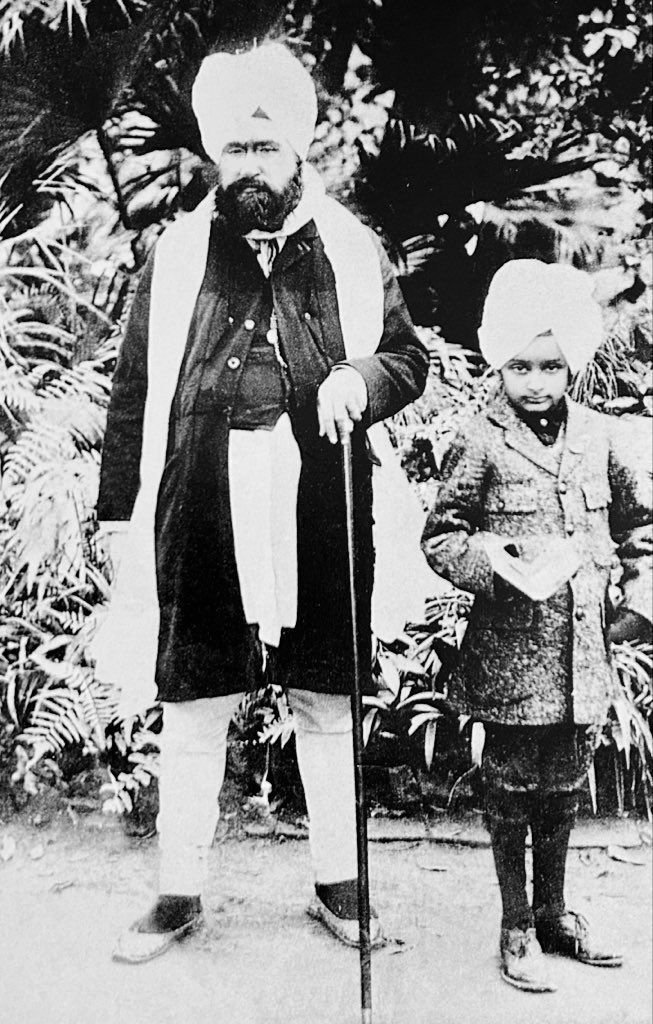
Photograph of Arur Singh, sarbarah of the Golden Temple, with a young boy

During the Punjab insurgency, the Khalistani militant outfit Dasmesh Khalsa set on-fire the samadh of Arur Singh in Naushehra Nangli in May 1984, fired upon the complex, and issued a letter to his familial relatives warning them that traitors to the Sikhs "would not be spared".

Simranjit Singh Mann is Arur Singh's grandson. Shergill's maternal grandson, pro-Khalistan leader Simranjit Singh Mann, the president of Shiromani Akali Dal (Amritsar) apologised in 2001 for the honour given to Dyer by his maternal grandfather. Mann also justified Shergill's decision in 2022 by saying, "he did it to save the Golden Temple from bombing on the advice of then principal of Khalsa College G. A. Wathen."
