= Gobind Singh Longowal =

Indian politician (born 1959)

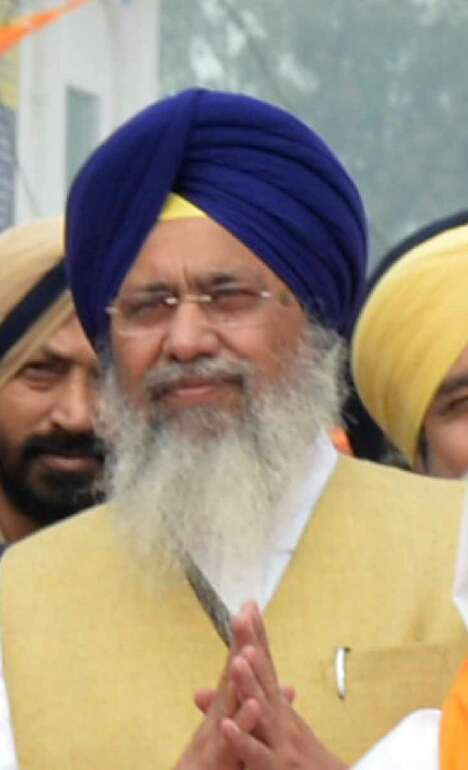

Personal details
- Born: 18 September 1959 Longowal, Sangrur, India
- Party: Shiromani Akali Dal (Punar Surjit)
- Other political affiliations: Shiromani Akali Dal
- Spouse: Amarpal Kaur
- Occupation: Former President of the SGPC

Gobind Singh Longowal was born on 18 September 1959 in a Jat Sikh family in Longowal, District Sangrur, Punjab India. He was elected as President of SGPC on November 29. He worked as assistant with Harchand Singh Longowal from the age of seven years. In the year 1985 he was elected as MLA from halka Dhanaula. In 1986 he became Chairman of Markfed. In the year 1997 he was again elected as MLA from halka Dhanaula and became minister in the Punjab government. He was again elected as MLA from Dhanaula in the year 2002. He was also appointed Chairman District Planning Board, Sangrur, In the year 2015 elected as MLA from Dhuri in by election and now serving the people of Lehragaga halka.

== Electoral performance ==
2015 Punjab Legislative Assembly Bye election : Dhuri
Party	Candidate	Votes	%	±%
SAD	Gobind Singh Longowal	67,596	61.52	▲26.92
INC	Simarpratap Singh	30,095	27.39	▼18.26
SAD(A)	Surjit Singh Kalabula	7,554	6.87	New entry
CPI	Sukhdev Ram Sharma	1,933	1.76	New entry
NOTA	None of the above	1,071		
Independent	Bikram Kumar	835	0.76	New entry
Independent	Ranjit Singh Bhasin	535	0.49	New entry
Independent	Gurmeet Singh	397	0.36	New entry
Independent	Sarabjit Singh	261	0.24	New entry
Jai Jawan Jai Kisan Party	Manjit Kaur	203	0.18	New entry
Independent	Jora Singh	174	0.16	New entry
Independent	Rattan Lal	163	0.15	▼0.90
Independent	Gurpreet Singh	134	0.12	New entry
Margin of victory		37,501		
Total valid votes		1,10,951		
Rejected ballots		0		
Turnout		1,10,951		
Registered electors		1,51,952		
SAD gain from INC		Swing		

2017 Punjab Legislative Assembly election : Dhuri
Party	Candidate	Votes	%	±%
INC	Dalvir Singh Goldy	49,347	38.62	▲11.23
AAP	Jasvir Singh Jassi Sekhon	46,536	36.42	New entry
SAD	Hari Singh	28,611	22.39	▼39.13
SAD(M)	Surjit Singh Kalabula	1,405	1.10	▼5.77
BSP	Bhola Singh	1,390	1.09	New entry
NOTA	None of the Above	662	0.52	
Independent	Tarsem Kumar	474	0.37	New entry
Margin of victory		2,811	2.19	
Total valid votes		1,28,425	81.04	
Rejected ballots		315		
Turnout		1,28,740	81.23	
Registered electors		1,58,479		
INC gain from SAD		Swing		
