= Shiromani Akali Dal (Longowal) =

Political party

Shiromani Akali Dal (Longowal) was a splinter group of the Parkash Singh Badal-led Shiromani Akali Dal (SAD). The party was launched in 2004 with Surjit Kaur Barnala (wife of SAD leader Surjit Singh Barnala) as its president. Prem Singh Chandumajra also joined it after being denied a ticked by the Badal-led SAD, but later left to join SAD (Badal) again in 2007.

The party contested the Patiala seat, but failed. In 2007, the party merged back into the Badal-led Shiromani Akali Dal.

Later, however, the party split out of SAD again. In 2014, the party merged into the Indian National Congress this time.
