= Sarbarah =

Manager role of the Golden Temple during British India

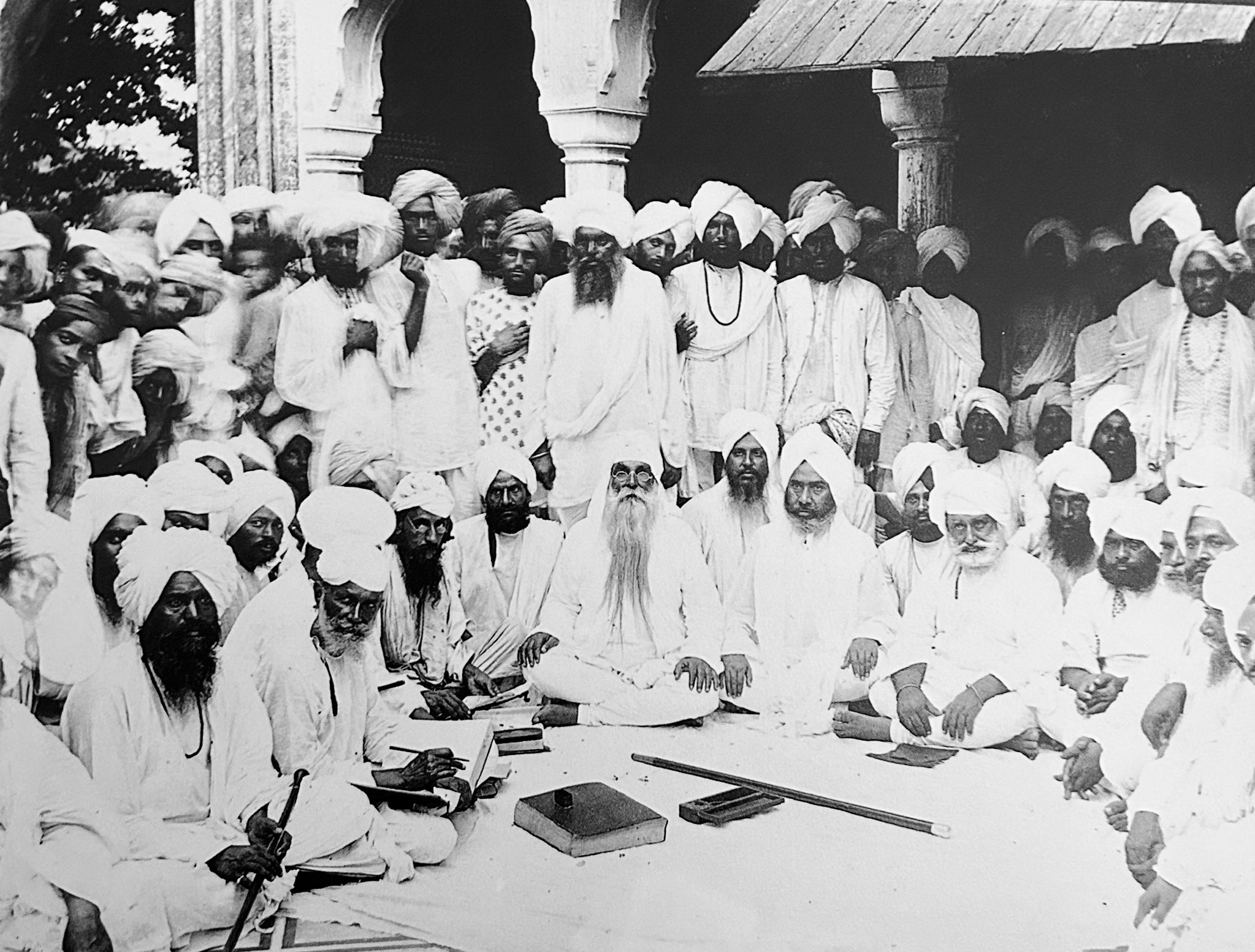
Photograph of Man Singh of Rariala presiding as Sarabrah of the Golden Temple complex at a meeting outside the Darshani Deohri, Amritsar, ca.1880–85

The Sarbarah was a custodianship position in British Punjab where a person would oversee the affairs of the Golden Temple complex in Amritsar as a temple-manager. The person who fulfilled the role was appointed by the colonial-government. (Note: 'Sarbarah is alternatively spelt as sarbrah, sarabarah, or sarabrah.) The position was created by the British after their annexation of the Punjab and it ended in 1920.

== History ==
=== Pre-colonial administration ===
The early administrative structure of the complex involved four general categories of posts:

- Granthis – responsible for taking care of the Guru Granth Sahib and keeping it in prakash
- Pujaris
- Musicians (ragis and rababis)
- Employees (mulazam)

During the earliest era, the position of head granthi was not a hereditary one but rather based on merit with caste playing no role in the selection. In late August 1604 when the Adi Granth was installed at the complex by Guru Arjan, he appointed Baba Buddha as the first granthi of the site. The Adi Granth at that time was kept at Guru ke Mahal, which was where the Sikh guru resided. During amritvela (early morning), it was brought to the Darbar Sahib proper and installed on a daily basis. After the death of Guru Gobind Singh in 1708, administration over the site was contested over by the two main Sikh factions, the Tatt Khalsa versus the Bandai Khalsa. After 1719, Mata Sundari sent Bhai Mani Singh and six other Sikhs to administer the Darbar Sahib. In 1721, conflict between the Tatt Khalsa and Bandais almost led to violence but Mani Singh brokered a peace between the two sides.

These former practices were followed until c. 1740 CE. Reformations of the site's administration followed in the result of the Persian and Afghan invasions and desecrations of the site. After the reconstruction of the site and reorgnaization of the Khalsa, an Udasi named Baba Gopal Das Udasin was established as both the site's granthi and pujari. However, due to corruption he was removed from the site administration, being succeeded by Bhai Chanchal Singh, who was in turn succeeded by Atma Singh. After Atma Singh, the next granthi Sham Singh introduced additional granthis to assist with the administration of the complex, serving in rotational turns. During the Sikh Empire, Ranjit Singh abolished the system of collective manegement of the site by the sardars of the Sikh Confederacy. He further entrusted general management of the site as the responsibility of Desa Singh Majithia, with his role being inherited by his son Lehna Singh Majithia.

Starting in 1846 after the first Anglo-Sikh war, the British Resident in Lahore began engaging with the management of the complex. The British used the past example of Ranjit Singh's interference in the management of the site to justify their own interventions. While Lehna Singh maintained his post nominally, real power now laid with the British Resident of Lahore. In November 1847, Henry Lawrence signed an order regarding monetary allowances for the site and granted a jagir to one of the granthis of the site, Makhan Singh. In 1848, Lehna Singh Majithia shifted to Benaras and thus the British later appointed a loyalist named Jodh Singh to serve as the temple's manager. The general committee was formed with Raja Teja Singh as president and Jodh Singh both being the extra assistant commissioner (executive officer) and manager (sarbarah). The extra assistant commissioner role oversaw the temple and while the manager had the power to fine and temporarily banish pujaris for wrongdoing, with Jodh Singh having both roles, including financial oversight over the complex. The British after annexing Punjab did not cease state financial support to the religious site, with 4,000 rupees per year being given for maintenance and nearly 30,000 rupees to support granthis, pujaris, rababis, and other employees and auxiliary structures (including the bungas). The British financially supported the site to increase their influence and goodwill amongst the Sikhs for their rule.

=== Formation ===
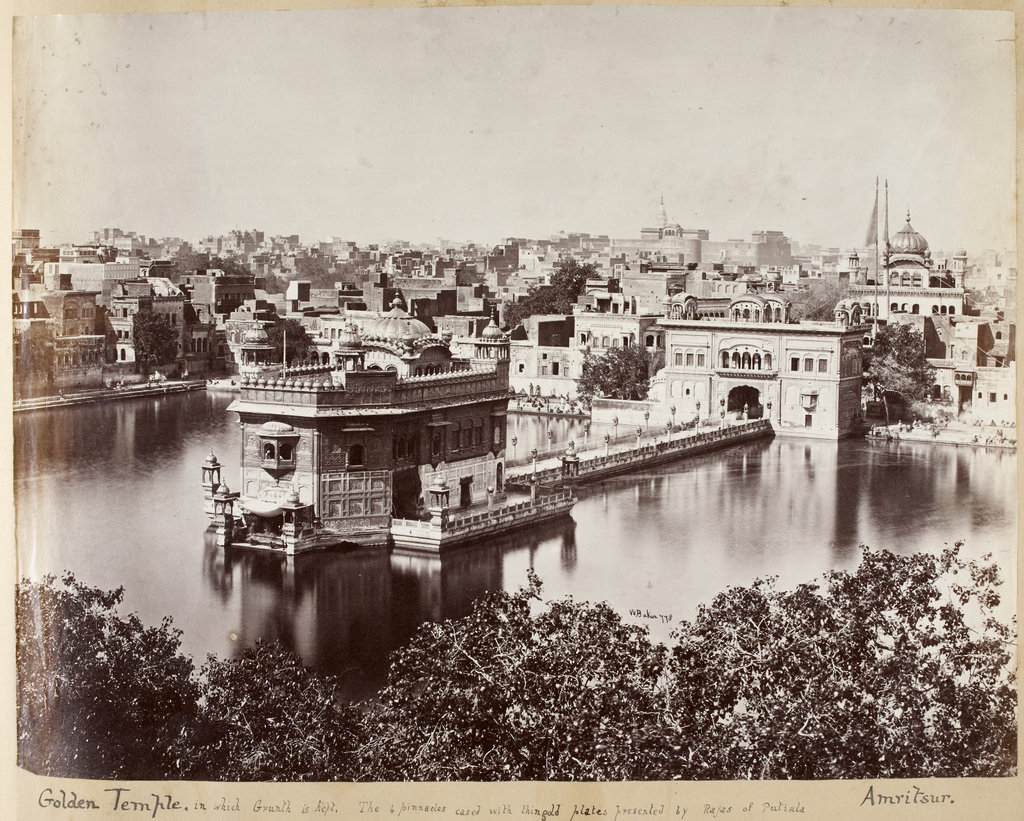
Photograph of the Golden Temple in Amritsar, by William Henry Baker, circa 1860's

In the period after annexation in 1849 until 1859, the Golden Temple complex was managed by a series of mahants under British-control. The Extra-Assistant Commissioner, under the Chief Commissioner of Punjab, held the power to fine persons for misconduct and also the ability to bar their entry into the complex. After the Indian Mutiny, the pujari caretakers of the shrines of the Golden Temple, the Akal Takht, and auxiliary shrines started bickering over management of funds from daily offerings and the Sikh sardars supposed to manage the shrines failed to fulfill their duties, thus a meeting was held in 1859 headed by Raja Teja Singh of Sheikhupura at his residence. The meeting was to resolve any disputes over the management of shrine and set-out the framework for managing them, with the meeting being attended also by Deputy Commissioner Cooper. Thus through the dastur of 1859, the pujaris became servants of the Golden Temple and any parties that had rights over the shrine and its institutions, but the pujaris could still enjoy the temple's property and income. Furthermore, in 1860 there was rivalry between Jodh Singh and Pardaman Singh over who should be appointed as the sarbarah.

After the administrative regulations (dastur-ul-amal) were created by Sikh delegates, a committee (that the British had direct-control over) was created that could appoint a manager for the complex. The committee consisted of nine trustees (sardars), who worked regularly regarding the finances, administration, and discipline regarding the complex whilst the sarbarah carried out the instructions of the nine sardars. The committee of trustees also acted as the Municipal Committee of the town of Amritsar.

=== Controversies and opposition ===
In 1883, the committee structure was silently ended and the position of sarbarah became more powerful without a committee overseeing them, with the sarbarah now answering to the Deputy Commissioner. Thus, corruption began to increase in the role.

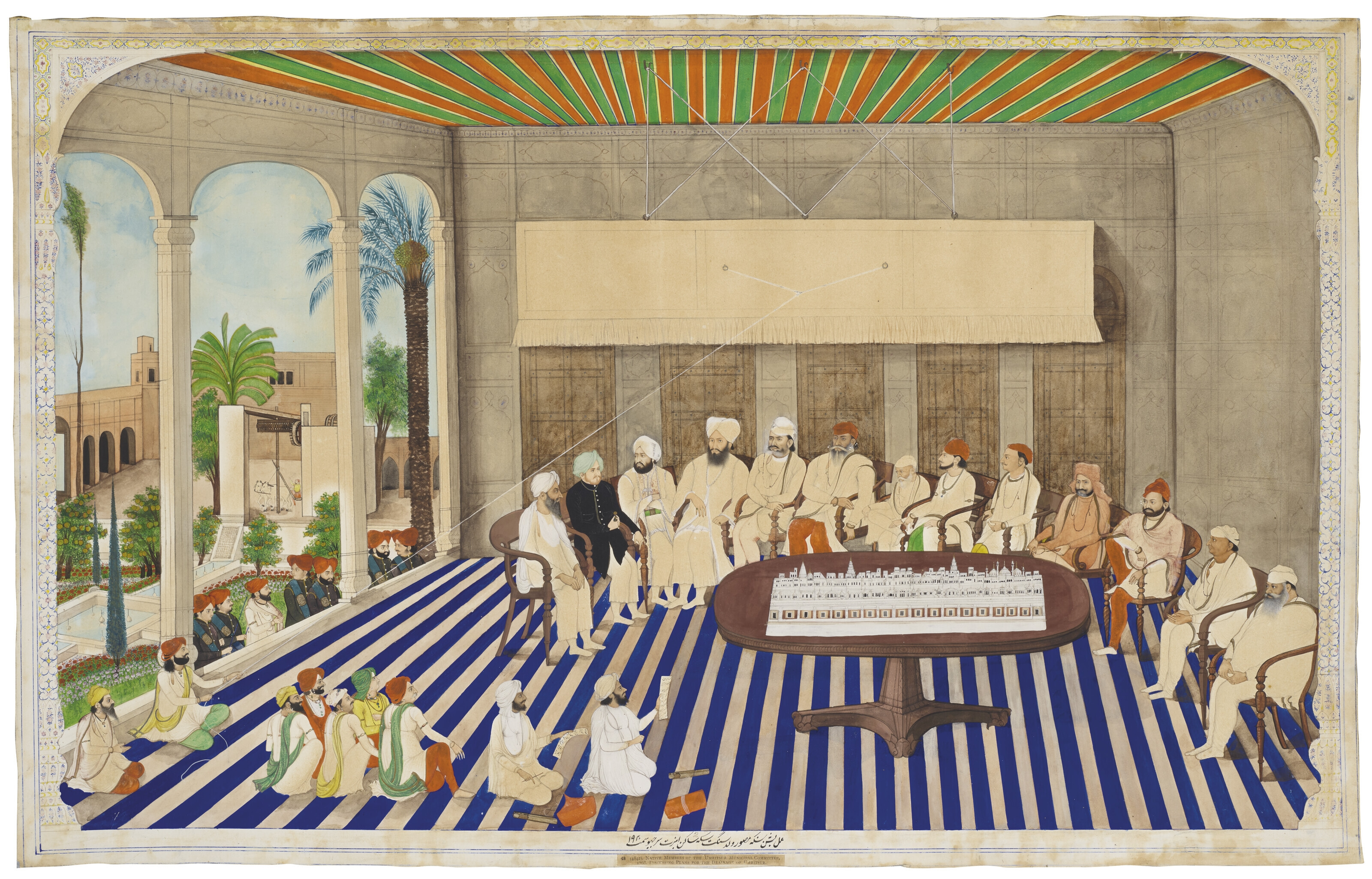
Painting of native members of the Amritsar Municipal Committee discussing plans for the drainage of Amritsar, by Bishan Singh, 1868

The position of sarbarah was appointed by the Punjab government, specifically the Deputy Commissioner of Amritsar District and/or their Divisional Commissioner, whom were supported by the Lieutenant-Governors. The chosen Sikh for the role was characteristically pro-British (termed disparagingly as todis) and well-known. An example is Man Singh, who had served the British in the Indian Mutiny of 1857–58 as part of Hodson's Horse, later having the sarbarah role which he held until an old-age.

The system was criticized in the local press for its inefficiency and malpractices. Two sarbarahs in-particular faced a lot of criticism: Jawala Singh and Arur Singh. It was alleged that karah parshad from the complex would be delivered to the houses of Magistrates and police-officers. The expensive scarves that were meant to wrap the Guru Granth Sahib were auctioned off by the sarbarah or their usage allowed for wives and children of priests of the complex. In 1896, there was a proposal to electrify the Golden Temple complex to beautify it and provide lighting, however this project would stall due to its controversy, as many Sikhs thought it would pose a danger to the shrine. Thus, the electrification project did not finalize until the Shiromani Gurdwara Parbandhak Committee took over management of the complex in the 1920s. By the early 20th century, Sikh organizations, such as the Chief Khalsa Diwan, agitated for reform to end the British influence in the temple managerial position and permit the Sikhs to appoint their own manager. Jawala Singh was controversial due to claimed corruption, appropriation of funds, being a military-man, and his lack of education due to him being a supposed "illiterate Jat". In 1901, Jawala Singh claimed in court to be a representative of Guru Ram Das in his role, which sparked calls of blasphemy against him.

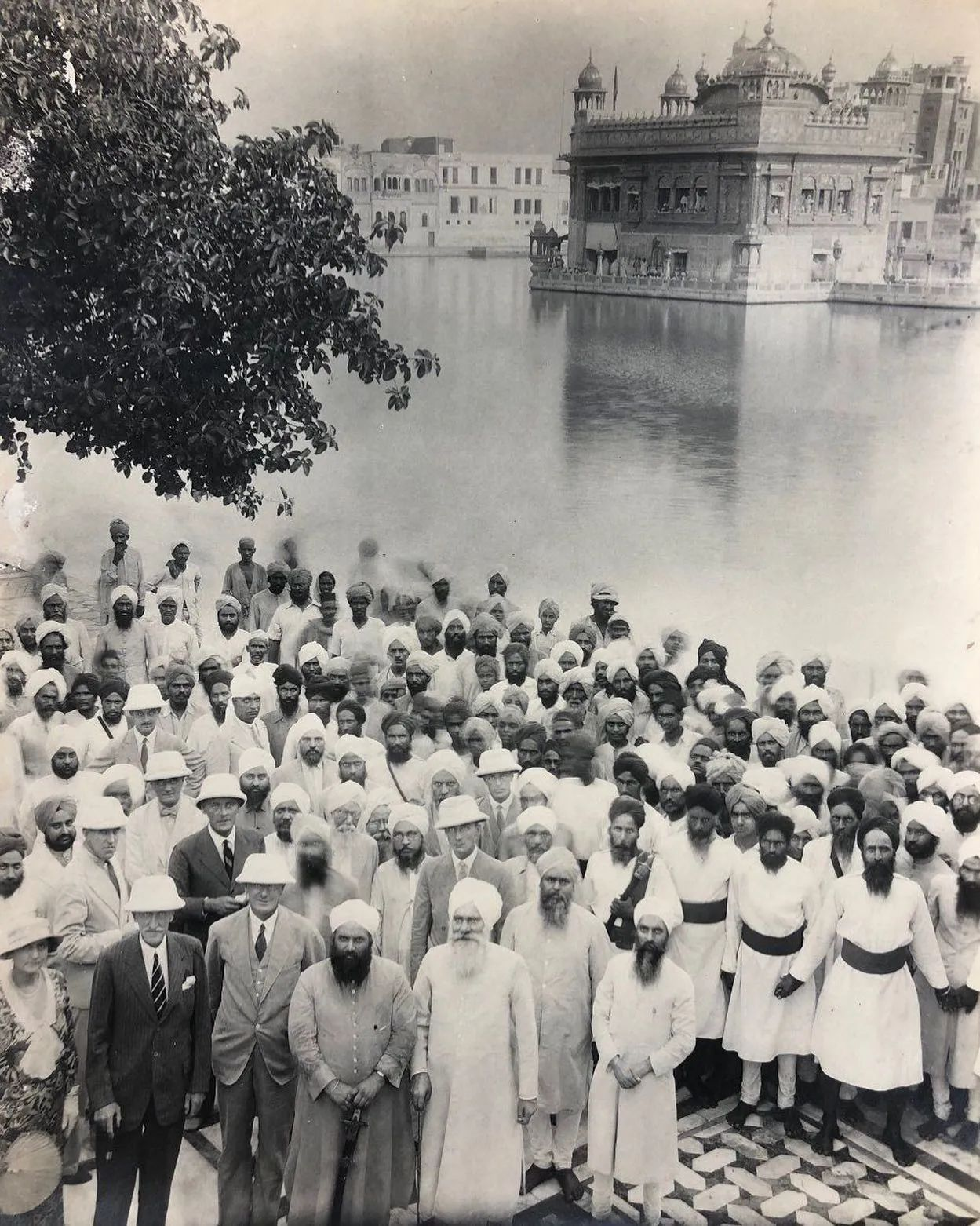
Photograph of the Governor of Punjab at the Golden Temple alongside members of the temple management, Amritsar, Punjab, ca.1910

Arur Singh, Jawala's successor, was criticized for nepotism, his opium consumption, and neglecting his duties as caretaker since he was preoccupied with his work as Honorary Magistrate in Nowshera Nangli. Furthermore, there were concerns raised about nefarious activities taking places in the various hospices (bungas) that surrounded the complex, such as gambling and women of "doubtful character". On 1 May 1905, Arur Singh banned Brahmins from bringing in idols and worshipping them on the parikarma, washing their clothes in the sarovar, and spitting into and rinsing their mouth with its waters. However, he continued to allow them to perform puja, bathe in the tank, and apply tilak. Arur Singh stroked controversy when he arranged a Sikh diwan in-front of the Akal Takht for General Dyer after the Jallianwala Bagh massacre to display loyalty to the British. Arur Singh also awarded a saropa (robe-of-honour) upon General Dyer, which led to further opposition to the institution.

=== Dissolution ===
The British attempted to appoint a new sarbarah in 1920 but the Sikhs demanded that they be given full control over the management of the complex. The new sarbarah, Captain Bahadur Singh, would leave the position shortly after his appointment due to Sikh opposition. Sundar Singh Ramgarhia would become the caretaker of the complex as the new sarbarah, leading toward the start of management of the complex by the SGPC. After Sundar Singh Ramgarhia became manager, the "keys affair" (morcha chabian) would erupt in 1921, due to the British declining to handover the keys to the complex's treasury (toshakhana) to the new management. On 29 October 1921, the SGPC demanded that the sarbarah Sundar Singh Ramgarhia hand-over the keys to them to guarantee their total control over the management affairs of the complex. However, the colonial government opposed this move under the guise of claiming that the Sikh reformers would appropriate funds for radical, political agendas.

== List of sarbarahs ==
List of sarbarahs
Name	Portrait	Term
Jodh Singh		1859–1862
Mangal Singh Ramgarhia		1862–1879
Man Singh Waraich		1879–1890
Arjan Singh Chahal		1890–1896
Jawala Singh		1896–1902
Arur Singh Shergill		1902–1920
Bahadur Singh		1920
Sundar Singh Ramgarhia		1920–1921
