= Lehna Singh Tur =

Indian Sikh politician

Lehna Singh Tur was an Indian Sikh politician.

Born in Tur village of Amritsar District on 12 February 1941, Lehna Singh Tur was the son of Jathedar Mohan Singh Tur. He studied law at Punjab University in Chandigarh and Patiala, and obtained B.A. and L.L.B. degrees. He married Baldev Kaur on in 1972. He served as legal advisor for various bodies, for example cooperative banks, local governments and the Punjab State Electricity Board.

He was elected to the Lok Sabha from the Tarn Taran constituency in the 1980 Indian general election. His father had represented Tarn Taran in the previous Lok Sabha. Lehna Singh Tur stood as a Shiromani Akali Dal candidate and obtained 46% of the vote, defeating the Indian National Congress candidate Gurdial Singh Dhillon. He was the sole non-Congress candidate to win a seat from Punjab in the 1980 election. Notably, whilst Lehna Singh Tur benefitted from the standing of his family in the area, his candidature was opposed by the SAD and SPGC presidents.

During his tenure in the Lok Sabha he resigned from SAD, leaving the party unrepresented in the lower house of Parliament.

Lehna Singh Tur died in 2011. He was cremated with full state honours. He was survived by one son and two daughters.
