= Partap Singh Kairon =

Indian politician

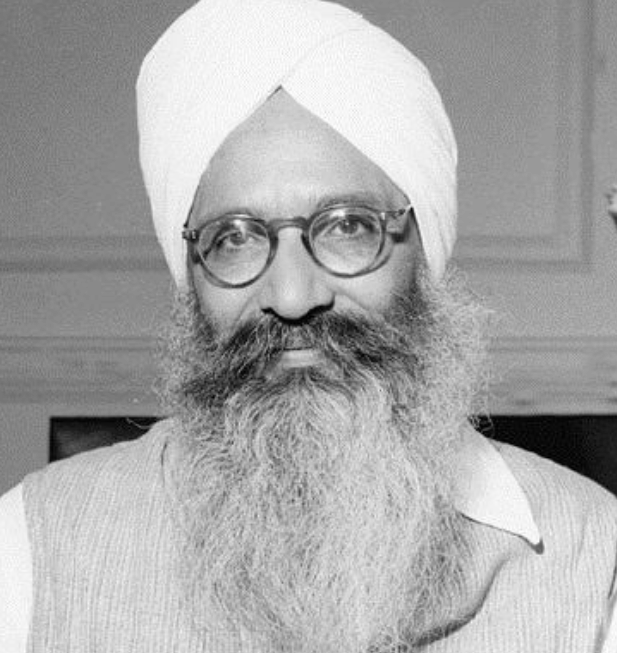

3rd Chief Minister of Punjab
- In office 23 January 1956 – 21 June 1964
- Preceded by: Bhim Sen Sachar
- Succeeded by: Gopi Chand Bhargava (caretaker); Ram Kishan

Personal details
- Born: 1 October 1901 Kairon, Punjab, British India
- Died: 6 February 1965 (aged 63) Sonipat, Punjab, India (now in Haryana, India)
- Cause of death: Gunshot wound
- Party: Shiromani Akali Dal (1937-1941); Indian National Congress (1941-1965)
- Children: 3 children
- Parent: S. Nihal Singh

Partap Singh Kairon (1 October 1901 – 6 February 1965) was the 3rd chief minister of the Punjab province (then comprising Punjab, Haryana and part of Himachal Pradesh), and is widely acknowledged as the architect of post-Independence Punjab Province (or Punjab, Haryana and Himachal as of today). Moreover, he was an Indian independence movement leader. He was jailed twice by the British Empire, once for five years for organizing protests against British rule. His political influence and views are still considered to dominate politics in Punjab.

== Early life ==
Partap Singh Kairon was born on 1 October 1901, into a Dhillon Jat Sikh family. His last name was taken from the village of Kairon in the Amritsar district, of Tehsil Tarn Taran in province of Punjab during the British Raj era. His grandfather was Sardar Gulab Singh Dhillon. His father, Nihal Singh Kairon (1863-1927), was a pioneer in initiating women's education in the province. Partap studied at Col. Brown Cambridge School in Dehra Dun and Khalsa College, Amritsar and then went to the United States for further studies. During his time in USA, he supported himself by working on farms and in factories. He received his master's degree in political science from the University of Michigan. He also received his master's degree in economics from University of California at Berkeley before going to Michigan. He was impressed by farming methods practised in the U.S. and hoped to replicate the same in India later.

== Family ==
Partap Singh Kairon had 3 children, including Surinder Singh Kairon, Gurinder Singh Kairon and Sar Brinder Kaur respectively. While the younger Gurinder remained Congressman like his father, Surinder later joined Shiromani Akali Dal. Surinder's son Adesh Partap Singh Kairon is married to the daughter of Prakash Singh Badal, Preneet Kaur and has been a minister in the Punjab government (Shiromani Akali Dal).

== Political career ==
=== Entry into politics ===
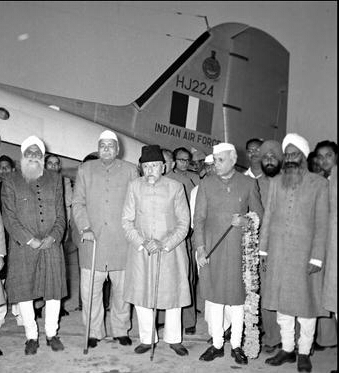
Partap Singh Kairon with Gurmukh Singh Musafir (extreme left) and other political leaders at Amritsar Airport on 6 February 1956

Kairon returned to India in 1929. On 13 April 1932 he started an English language weekly paper called The New Era in Amritsar. He joined politics and the newspaper was eventually shut down. He was first a member of the Shiromani Akali Dal, and later of the Indian National Congress. He was jailed in 1932 for five years for participating in civil disobedience. He entered the Punjab Legislative Assembly as an Akali nominee in 1937, defeating the Congress candidate, Baba Gurdit Singh of Sarhali.

From 1941 to 1946, he was the general secretary of the Punjab Provincial Congress Committee. He was jailed again in the 1942 Quit India Movement and was elected to the Constituent Assembly in 1946.

=== In power ===
After Independence in 1947, Partap Singh Kairon held various offices in the elected state government including Rehabilitation Minister, Development Minister (1947–1949) and Chief Minister (21 January 1956 to 23 June 1964).

=== Minister for Rehabilitation ===
As Minister for Rehabilitation in the days immediately after Partition of India, Kairon handled the task of resettlement of millions of refugees who had migrated from West Punjab (Pakistan). Over three million migrated people were resettled in East Punjab (India) by allotment of dwellings, employments and land distribution, in a very short period of time.

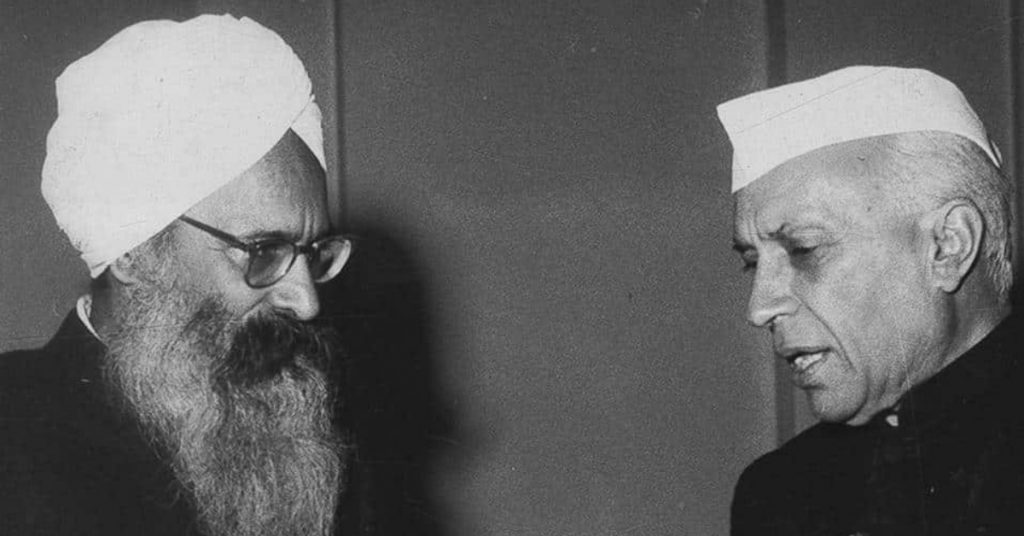
Partap Singh Kairon (left) with the prime minister of India, Jawaharlal Nehru (right) on 30 December 1958

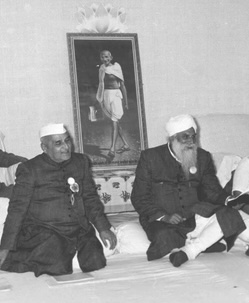
Former Chief Minister of Punjab Bhim Sen Sachar (Left) and Partap Singh Kairon (Right) attending Congress working committee meeting in Amrirsar on 8 February 1956.

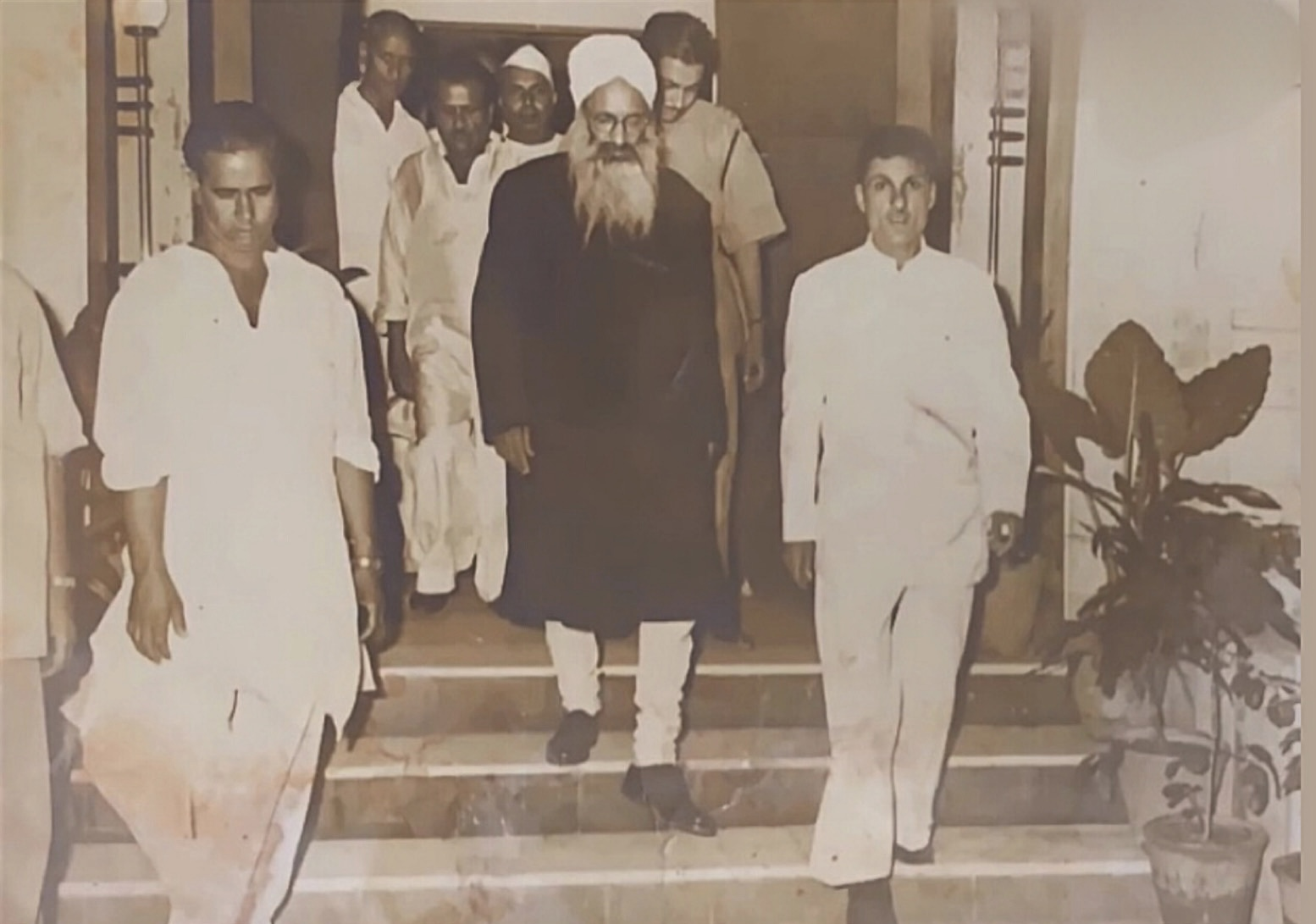
Partap Singh Kairon with Narayan Prasad Shukla (then Home Minister) and Laxman Singh Chauhan (then Mayor of Indore).

== Assassination ==
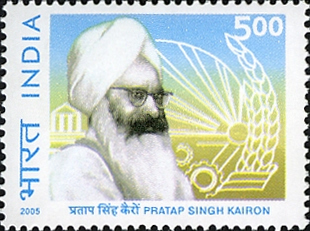
Partap Singh Kairon 2005 stamp of India

In 1964, following the publication of the report of the commission of inquiry which had exonerated him of the bulk of the allegations made against him by his political adversaries, Partap Singh Kairon resigned from his position as chief minister of the Punjab.

On 6 February 1965, he was on his way from Delhi to Chandigarh when he was waylaid near Rasoi village, Sonipat district, and shot dead along with his personal assistant — an IAS officer, and the driver. The three were murdered by Sucha Bassi, Baldev Singh and Nahar Singh 'Fauji'. Sucha had planned the killing of Kairon in revenge, because he believed that Kairon had taken a personal interest in securing the conviction of one Ajit Singh and his father Bir Singh in a murder case. Sucha Bassi, Baldev Singh and Nahar Singh 'Fauji' — were convicted and hanged in 1970, while the fourth accused, Daya Singh was sentenced to life imprisonment and released in 1994.

== See also ==
- List of assassinated Indian politicians
- Punjab's political families
