= Chak 45 GB =

Chak No. 45/GB
- Tarn Taran
- Location within Pakistan
- Coordinates: 31°6′32″N 72°48′17″E
- Country: Pakistan
- Province: Punjab
- District: Faisalabad
- Tehsil: Samundri
- Elevation: 169 m (554 ft)
- Time zone: UTC+5 (PST)
- Postal code: 37340
- Calling code: 041

Chak 45 GB (Urdu: ترن ترن, also known as Tiran Taran) is a village in Faisalabad District of Punjab, Pakistan. The village is located along Gojra-Samundri road. Its altitude is 169 metres (554 ft).
