= Surjit Kaur Barnala =

Indian politician

- Political party: Indian National Congress
- Other political affiliations: Shiromani Akali Dal (Longowal); Shiromani Akali Dal
- Spouse: Surjit Singh Barnala

Surjit Kaur Barnala is a Sikh politician from Punjab, India. She is the president of Shiromani Akali Dal (Longowal), a party which aims to support the thinking of Harcharan Singh Longowal and to get the Rajiv-Longowal Accord fully implemented. She was the wife of Surjit Singh Barnala.

== Family ==
Surjit Singh and Surjit Kaur had a daughter, Amrit Kaur Sandhu, who was married to an Indian Army officer, Major Adheshpal Singh Sandhu, but Amrit Kaur died in October 2012 due to cancer. Their eldest son, Jasjit Singh Barnala is a businessman, who runs Barnas International Pvt Ltd. The second son, Ganganjit Singh Barnala is also a politician like his father. Their youngest son, Neilinder Singh Barnala died in a car accident in 1996. They have seven grandchildren. Her husband died on 14 January 2017 after prolonged illness.
