= Jaswant Singh Gajjan Majra =

Indian politician

MLA, Punjab Legislative Assembly
- Incumbent
- Assumed office 2022
- Constituency: Amargarh
- Majority: Aam Aadmi Party

Personal details
- Party: Aam Aadmi Party

Jaswant Singh Gajjan Majra is an Indian politician and the MLA representing the Amargarh Assembly constituency in the Punjab Legislative Assembly. He is a member of the Aam Aadmi Party. He was elected as the MLA in the 2022 Punjab Legislative Assembly election.

== MLA ==
The Aam Aadmi Party gained a strong 79% majority in the sixteenth Punjab Legislative Assembly by winning 92 out of 117 seats in the 2022 Punjab Legislative Assembly election. MP Bhagwant Mann was sworn in as Chief Minister on 16 March 2022.

Committee assignments of Punjab Legislative Assembly

- Member (2022–23) Committee on Agriculture and its allied activities
- Member (2022–23) Committee on Co-operation and its allied activities

== Corruption and money laundering charges ==
On November 6, 2023, the ED arrested Gajjan Majra from Amargarh during a public meeting with party workers in Malerkotla. He was taken into custody under provisions of the Prevention of Money Laundering Act (PMLA) in a case involving alleged bank fraud worth approximately ₹40–41 crore. The case revolves around alleged misuse of loans obtained for purposes other than those stated. The loans, taken between 2011 and 2014 by Tara Corporation Limited (later renamed Malaudh Agro Ltd.) and associated entities, were allegedly diverted to other companies, including Tara Health Food Ltd. Approximately ₹3.12 crore was transferred to the MLA’s personal accounts, and about ₹33.99 crore to related firms.

On May 28, 2024, the Punjab and Haryana High Court upheld the lawfulness of Majra’s arrest and remand, affirming compliance with Section 19(1) of the PMLA. After nearly 11 months in custody, Majra was granted bail by the High Court on November 5, 2024.

== Electoral performance ==
Assembly Election, 2022: Amargarh
Party	Candidate	Votes	%	±%
AAP	Jaswant Singh Gajjanmajra	44,523	34.28	▲
SAD(A)	Simranjit Singh Mann	38,480	29.63	▲
SAD	Iqbal Singh Jhundan	26,068	20.07	▼
INC	Smit Singh	16,923	13.03	▼
PLC	Sardar Ali	1,342	1.03	New
NOTA	None of the above	595	0.46	▼
Majority		6,043	4.65	▼
Turnout		129,868	77.95	
Registered electors		165,909		
AAP gain from INC				

State Legislative Assembly
Preceded by -	Member of the Punjab Legislative Assembly from Amargarh Assembly constituency 2022 –	Incumbent
