= Smit Singh =

Indian Policy Maker, Politician, Communications Expert and Sports shooter

Smit Singh Mann
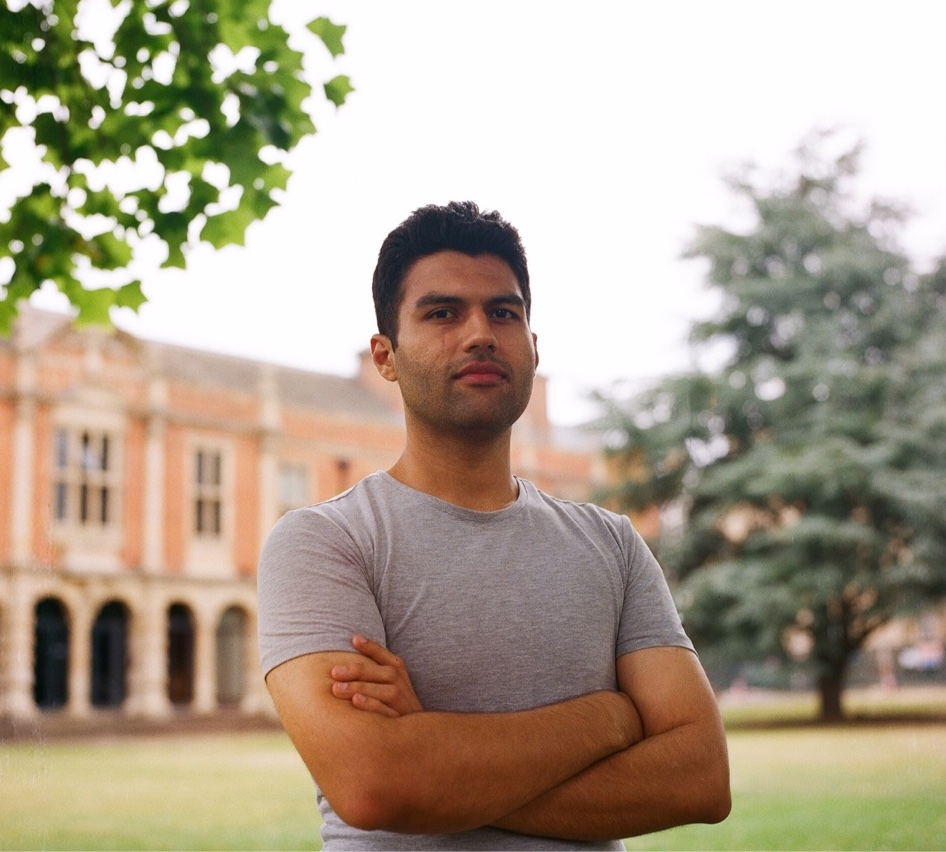
- Smit Singh in front of Somerville College Library, University of Oxford

Personal information
- Nationality: Indian
- Born: 18 January 1991 (age 35) Dhuri, Punjab, India
- Education: Somerville College, Oxford

Sport
- Country: India
- Sport: Skeet Shooting
Medal record
Men's shooting
Representing India
Asian Championships
Silver medal – second place	2012 Patiala	Skeet team
Asian Championships
Silver medal – second place	2011 Malaysia	Skeet team
Junior World Cup
Bronze medal – third place	2011 Finland	Skeet individual
Asian Championships
Gold medal – first place	2008 Jaipur	Skeet team
South Asian Championships
Silver medal – second place	2008 Pakistan	Skeet team
South Asian Championships
Bronze medal – third place	2008 Pakistan	Skeet individual
- Updated on 27 January 2015

Smit Singh (born 18 January 1991) is an International Sportsperson, Indian National Congress National Spokesperson and National Head for Sports department. Singh serves as the Principal Advisor to the chairperson, Parliamentary Standing Committee on Agriculture, Animal Husbandry and Food Processing, India. He has studied at Somerville College, University of Oxford and has also been a research associate at the Oxford India Centre for Sustainable Development.

Smit Singh has served as the State Public Policy Advisor with Government of Punjab, India, wherein he led multiple policy reforms implemented by the State Government between 2018 and 2022, along with developing a Public Policy Model for the Economic Governance of the State that was publicly announced by the Chief Minister of Punjab (India) Charanjit Singh Channi in February 2022, to be the official manifesto that would be implemented after constitution of the next Government of Punjab.

== International Sports Career ==
Smit Singh is an International Skeet Shooter, representing India. Singh started his international sporting career by participation in the Asian Shooting Championships, held in Kuwait in December 2007. He won his first international medal at Asian Clay Shooting Championships, February 2008. Later in the year, he won silver and bronze medal at the South Asian Shooting Championships, November 2008. He won India its first world-level medal in skeet shooting with a bronze trophy at International Junior Cup, Orimattila, Finland, July 2011.

At the ISSF World Cup, Al Ain, United Arab Emirates in April 2013, Smit Singh scored 123 out of 125 in qualifications, equalling the then World and Olympic Record, along with creating a new National Record of India. He is also the present National Games champion, having won two gold medals at the 35th National Games, Kerala, in February 2015.

After taking a year long break to study at the University of Oxford, in 2018 Smit returned to better his qualification score to 124 out of 125, becoming India Rank 1 again. He subsequently represented India at the Commonwealth Games 2018 held in Gold Coast, Australia and was the only Indian who qualified for the finals in Skeet Men's Event. Apart from Asian Games, Commonwealth Games and World Championships in over a decade long career in international sports, Singh participated in numerous other international championships for the Indian National Team.

On 9 July 2019, Smit Singh was awarded the Maharaja Ranjit Singh Award for his contribution in the field of sports (the Government of Punjab‘s highest civilian honour).

== Public Service ==
Smit Singh started working with Civil Society in his high school years, volunteering with Education and Environment focused Non-Government Organisation, an Indian Express report states that Singh while representing India in sports, used to regularly intern with social movements during his time off from international sports, working with NGOs such as Aman Biradari, environmental awareness campaigns such as Swechha Delhi and working for justice through People's Movements such as Narmada Bachao Andolan for rehabilitation of people, negatively affected by the large scale dams built in the Narmada Valley.

Before working with the Government of Punjab, India and Indian National Congress Party Singh was a career Civil Servant with the Oil & Natural Gas Corporation a Government of India owned Public Sector Undertaking.

In 2018, Smit advised the Government of Punjab on Municipal Solid Waste and Water Management. In 2020, Smit Singh led a Public Policy Think Tank as Chief Administrator of former Cabinet Minister Navjot Singh Sidhu’s Jittega Punjab initiative to research and effectively communicate diverse range of policy solutions to problems faced by the people of Punjab. Singh was a member of the Congress party’s high powered three member official delegation which met with 32 Indian Farmer Unions delegation, who were protesting against the three Indian Farm Laws of 2020 passed by BJP Government led by Prime Minister Modi to discuss the political solution for farmers demands on 10 September 2021, the controversial Farm Laws were later withdrawn by the Government of India due to ongoing protests by the Farmer Unions.

On 26 January 2022, just three weeks before polling date of 2022 Punjab State General Elections, Smit Singh was announced as an Indian National Congress MLA candidate from Amargarh Assembly Constituency for Punjab Vidhan Sabha. All India Congress Committee Punjab In-charge Harish Chaudhary and Punjab Pradesh Congress Committee President Navjot Singh Sidhu announce Smit Singh as an Indian National Congress MLA candidate from Amargarh Assembly Constituency for Punjab Vidhan Sabha to further Singh's Public Policy and social welfare agenda in solving Punjab's financial crisis and writing the party's state manifesto. An election he lost to businessman and AAP’s candidate Jaswant Singh Gajjanmajra in a loop-sided election wherein the AAP stormed to power with over 2/3rds majority in the State Legislative Assembly.
