= Sangrur district =

- District of Punjab
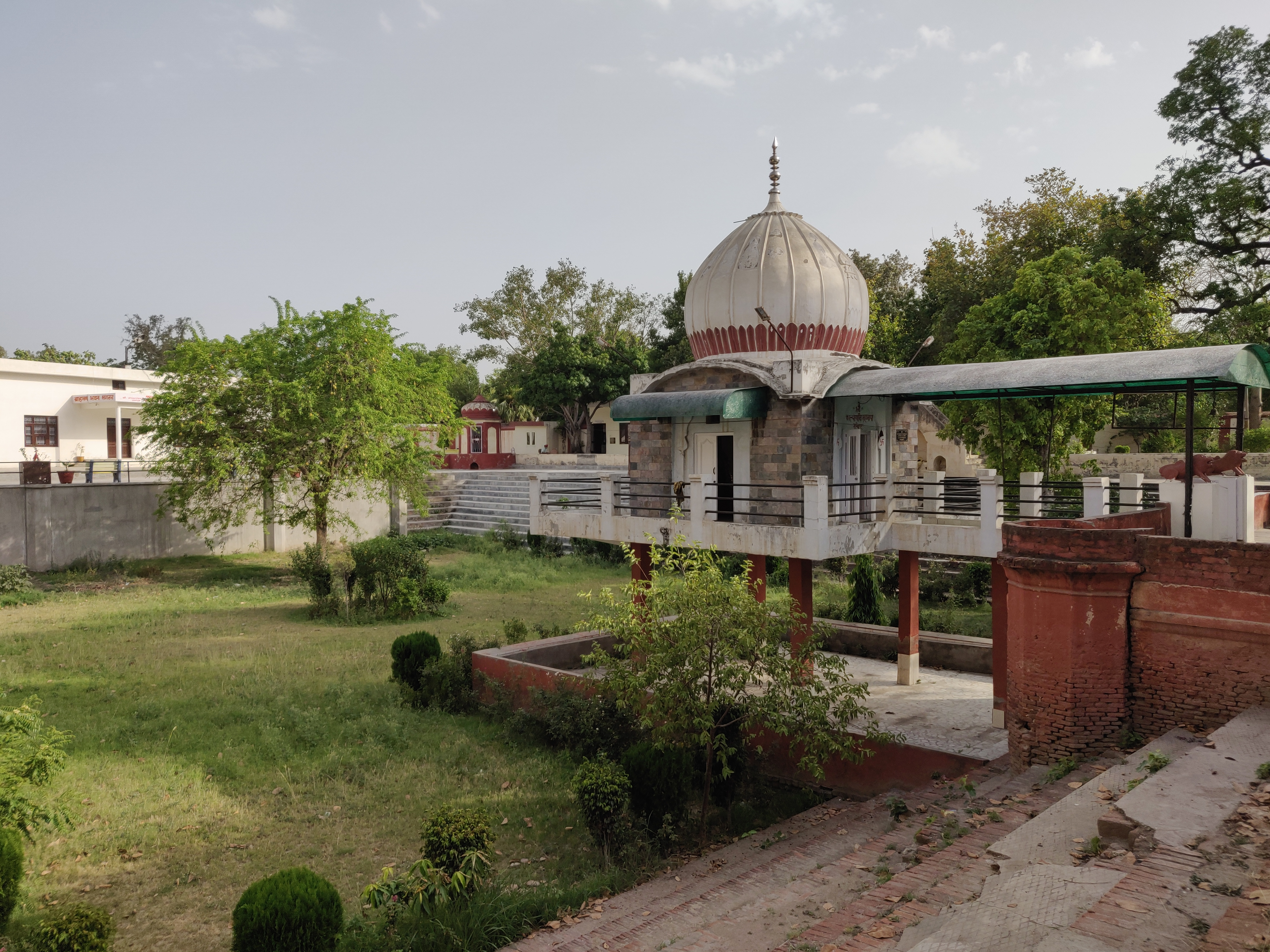
- Rajarajeshwari Temple in Sangrur

- Location in Punjab
- Coordinates: 30.23°N 75.83°E
- Country: India
- State: Punjab
- Headquarters: Sangrur

Area
  - Total: 2,848 km^{2} (1,100 sq mi)
- Elevation: 232 m (761 ft)

Population (2011)
  - Total: 1,225,415
  - Density: 430.3/km^{2} (1,114/sq mi)

Languages
  - Official: Punjabi
  - Regional: Punjabi: (Malwai); (Puadhi)
- Time zone: UTC+5:30 (IST)
- PIN: 148001
- Telephone code: 01672
- Vehicle registration: PB 13
- Website: sangrur.nic.in

Sangrur district is in the state of Punjab in northern India. Sangrur city is the district headquarters. It is one of the five districts in Patiala Division in the Indian state of Punjab. Neighbouring districts are Malerkotla (north), Barnala (west), Patiala (east), Mansa (southwest) and Fatehabad (Haryana) and Jind (Haryana) (south). The district is part of the Patiala division.

Sangrur consists of the cities of Dhuri, Lehragaga, Sangrur, and Sunam. Other cities are Bhawanigarh, Dirba, Khanauri, Longowal, Cheema and Moonak. There are 7 sub-divisions, being Sangrur, Dhuri, Sunam, Lehragaga, Moonak, Bhawanigarh and Dirba. Till 2006, Barnala was also a part of Sangrur district, but now it is a separate district. In 2021, a new district Malerkotla district, consisting of Malerkotla and Ahmedgarh subdivisions and the Amargarh sub-tehsil, was formed out of Sangrur district. Parts of the district are located in the Tihara sub-region of the larger Malwa region.

== History ==
Before 1773, Sangrur town was part of the Nabha state. In 1773–74, it came under the control of the Jind State following a quarrel between the two states. The region that now forms Sangrur district was historically divided among the princely states of Kaithal, Nabha, Jind, and Patiala. Until 1843, the parganas of Ghabdan and Khadial were part of Kaithal State. After Kaithal was annexed by the British, a few villages from the Mahalan Ghabdan area were transferred to Jind State as part of an exchange. During the British era, Sangrur, Badrukha, and 43 nearby villages (now in sangrur and sunam tehsil) were part of Jind State. However, the majority of the territory that now forms Sangrur district belonged to Patiala State, including areas like Sunam, Dhuri, Dirba, Moonak, Longowal, & Bhawanigarh with some areas also belonging to Nabha State.

In 1948, after the end of princely rule, the modern Sangrur district was created from territories of Nabha, Jind, and Patiala states and formed part of PEPSU. In 1953, the Barnala district was abolished, and its tehsils—Dhuri, Malerkotla, Barnala, and part of Phul—were merged into Sangrur. In 1956, PEPSU was merged with Punjab. In 1966, Jind and Narwana tehsils were transferred to form the new Haryana state Jind district during the Punjab Reorganisation. Later, in 2006, the entire Barnala tehsil was separated from Sangrur to form Barnala district. In 2021, Malerkotla tehsil was carved out to create the new Malerkotla district.

Settlements in Sangrur trace back to the pre-Harappan period. Recent excavations in Rohira in Sangrur have revealed a 10-metre high mound with settlements dating back to 2300 BC. Excavations from Mard Khera village have led to the discovery of pottery from the Harappan period. Remnants of pottery from the Kushan period have also been discovered.

== Demographics ==
Historical population
Year	Pop.	±% p.a.
1951	565,152	—
1961	696,418	+2.11%
1971	836,497	+1.85%
1981	1,026,166	+2.06%
1991	1,244,677	+1.95%
2001	1,473,242	+1.70%
2011	1,655,169	+1.17%

According to the 2011 census Sangrur district (including Malerkotla district) had a population of 1,655,169 of which male and female were 878,029 and 777,140 respectively, roughly equal to the nation of Guinea-Bissau or the US state of Idaho. This gives it a ranking of 300st in India (out of a total of 640). The district has a population density of 449 inhabitants per square kilometre (1,160/sq mi). Its population growth rate over the decade 2001-2011 was 12.3%. Sangrur has a sex ratio of 885 females for every 1000 males, and a literacy rate of 67.99%.

After bifurcation, the district had a population of 1,225,415. Scheduled Castes made up 368,562 (30.08%) of the population.

=== Gender ===
The table below shows the sex ratio of Sangrur district through decades.

Sex ratio of Sangrur district
Census year	1951	1961	1971	1981	1991	2001	2011
Sex ratio	820	832	840	860	870	870	885

The table below shows the child sex ratio of children below the age of 6 years in the rural and urban areas of Sangrur district.

Child sex ratio of children below the age of 6 years in Sangrur district
Year	Urban	Rural
2011	869	827
2001	803	779

=== Literacy ===
The table below shows the literacy rate of different CD blocks of Sangrur district, as of 2011.

Literacy rate by blocks in Sangrur district - Census 2011
Sr. No.	Block	Total	Male	Female	Gap
1	Malerkotla-I	72.48%	78.12%	66.25%	11.87%
2	Malerkotla-II	73.34%	79.03%	66.97%	12.06%
3	Sherpur	68.40%	73.14%	63.08%	10.06%
4	Dhuri	69.01%	74.77%	62.58%	12.19%
5	Bhawanigarh	65.81%	71.62%	59.29%	12.33%
6	Sangrur	64.62%	69.50%	59.09%	10.41%
7	Sunam	58.60%	63.45%	53.10%	10.35%
8	Lehragaga	55.24%	60.60%	49.20%	11.40%
9	Andana	59.90%	67.43%	51.60%	15.83%
	Sangrur District	64.79%	70.22%	58.70%	11.52%

=== Religion ===
Religion in Sangrur district (2011)
Religion	Percent
Sikhism	70.08%
Hinduism	26.49%
Islam	2.95%
Other or not stated	0.48%

Religion in tehsils of Sangrur district
Tehsil	Sikhism (%)	Hinduism (%)	Islam (%)	Others (%)
Dhuri	72.42	22.30	4.76	0.52
Sangrur	70.63	26.21	2.75	0.41
Sunam	76.31	20.73	2.4	0.56
Lehra	77.73	19.76	2.11	0.40
Moonak	40.95	56.00	2.18	0.87

Sikhism is followed by majority of the people in the Sangrur district. Hinduism is followed by a considerable population, and is majority in the border along Haryana. Before the division of Malerkotla district, Sangrur had the largest population of Muslims in Punjab. However in the residual district Muslims are a small minority.

=== Language ===
Languages of Sangrur district (2011)
1. Punjabi (94.9%)
2. Hindi (3.12%)
3. Haryanvi (1.48%)
4. Others (0.47%)

At the time of the 2011 census, 94.93% of the population spoke Punjabi, 3.12% Hindi and 1.48% Haryanvi as their first language.

== Health ==
The table below shows the data from the district nutrition profile of children below the age of 5 years, in Sangrur, as of year 2019-21.

District nutrition profile of children under 5 years of age in Sangrur, year 2020
Indicators	Percent (2019-21)	Percent (2015-16)
Stunted	23.4%	27.3%
Wasted	10.4%	18.0%
Severely wasted	3.8%	7.8%
Underweight	18.1%	19.2%
Overweight/obesity	2.7%	5.5%
Anemia	66.9%	51.4%

The table below shows the district nutrition profile of Sangrur of women between the ages of 15 and 49 years, as of year 2019-21.

District nutritional profile of Sangrur of women of 15-49 years, in 2020
Indicators	Percent (2019-21)	Percent (2015-16)
Underweight (BMI <18.5 kg/m^2)	14.1%	14.8%
Overweight/obesity	37.6%	30.3%
Anemia (non-preg)	52.7%	46.9%
Anemia (preg)	49.4%	53.3%

The table below shows the number of road accidents and people affected in Sangrur district (including Malerkotla) by year.

Road accidents and people affected in Sangrur district (including Malerkotla) by year
Year	Accidents	Killed	Injured	Vehicles Involved
2022	340	229	210	571
2021	361	257	219	595
2020	347	241	208	645
2019	393	240	286	688

== Economy ==
In 2009-10, there were a total of 10,695 registered industrial units in Sangrur district. Of these, 23 were large and medium units. Small scale industries employed 53,259 workers and large and medium industries employed 10,325 people.

== Politics ==
No.	Constituency	Name of MLA	Party	Bench
99	Lehragaga	Barinder Kumar Goyal	Aam Aadmi Party	Government
100	Dirba (SC)	Harpal Singh Cheema	Aam Aadmi Party	Government
101	Sunam	Aman Arora	Aam Aadmi Party	Government
102	Malerkotla (SC)	Mohammad Jamil Ur Rehman	Aam Aadmi Party	Government
103	Amargarh	Jaswant Singh Gajjan Majra	Aam Aadmi Party	Government
104	Dhuri	Bhagwant Mann	Aam Aadmi Party	Government
105	Sangrur	Narinder Kaur Bharaj	Aam Aadmi Party	Government

== Administration ==
Sangrur district is further sub-divided into 7 sub-divisions/tehsils - Bhawanigarh, Dhuri, Dirba, Lehragaga, Moonak, Sangrur and Sunam.

The district is part of the Sangrur Lok Sabha constituency.

=== Subdistricts of Sangrur district ===
According to the Indian government's integrated online directory, Sangrur district is divided into the following subdistricts (tehsils/subdivisions) and blocks:

- Subdistricts
  1. Bhawanigarh
  2. Dhuri
  3. Dirba
  4. Lehra
  5. Moonak
  6. Sangrur
  7. Sunam
- Blocks:
  1. Andana
  2. Bhawani Garh
  3. Chhajli
  4. Dhuri
  5. Dirba
  6. Lehragaga
  7. Sangrur
  8. Sherpur
  9. Sunam
  10. Sunam Udham Singh Wala-2 At Sangrur

== Villages ==
- Uppli

== Historical Places and Monuments ==
- Banasar Bagh, Sangrur
- Suraj Kund Mandir, Sunam
- Bir Aishvan Wildlife Sanctuary
- Gurudwara Nankiana Sahib
- Jind State Memorial Museum, Sangrur
- Ancestral house of Sardar Udham Singh, Sunam - The house of India's independence activist has been renovated and converted into a museum. Apart from the building itself, around 30 letters and other objects related to him are at display in the museum.
- Shahi Samadhan, Sangrur
- Clock Tower, Sangrur
- Fort Badrukhan - The fort was the residence of Maharaja Ranjit Singh's mother, Raj Kaur.

== Notable people ==
- Gulab Kaur, Indian freedom fighter
- Karamjit Anmol, actor, comedian and singer
- Aman Arora, politician
- Brish Bhan, freedom fighter, politician
- Rajinder Kaur Bhattal, politician
- Binnu Dhillon, actor and comedian
- Parminder Singh Dhindsa, politician
- Sukhdev Singh Dhindsa, politician
- Megh R. Goyal, an influential engineer and professor in Puerto Rico, where he did pioneer work on irrigation
- Naresh Goyal, founder of Jet Airways
- Bhagwant Mann, actor, comedian and current chief Minister of Punjab
- Roshan Prince, singer and actor
- Rana Ranbir, actor, comedian, and writer
- Ajmer Singh, a sprint runner athlete
- Amritpal Singh, a long jump athlete
- G. K. Singh, civil servant
- Manvir Singh, football player
- Udham Singh, Indian independence activist
- Amarjeet Sohi, Canadian politician
- Gurbachan Singh Talib, a Sikh scholar, professor, and author
- Ranjit Singh Dhadrian Wala, Sikh preacher

== Educational institutions ==
Sant Longowal Institute of Engineering and Technology

== See also ==
- PGIMER Satellite Centre Sangrur
- Bir Aishvan Wildlife Sanctuary- Wildlife Sanctuary in the district
