= Mand Bhim Kadim =

- Village
- Location in Punjab, India Mand Bhim Kadim (India)
- Coordinates: 31.250890°N 75.091775°E
- Country: India
- State: Punjab
- District: Kapurthala

Government
  - Type: Panchayati raj (India)
  - Body: Gram panchayat

Languages
  - Official: Punjabi
  - Other spoken: Hindi
- Time zone: UTC+5:30 (IST)
- PIN: 144626
- Telephone code: 01822
- ISO 3166 code: IN-PB
- Vehicle registration: PB-09
- Website: kapurthala.gov.in

Mand Bhim Kadim is a village in Sultanpur Lodhi tehsil in Kapurthala district of Punjab, India. Kadim is an Arabic word for old. It is located 10 kilometres (6.2 mi) from the city of Sultanpur Lodhi, and 35 kilometres (22 mi) away from district headquarter, Kapurthala. The village is administrated by a sarpanch who is an elected representative of the village as per the constitution of India and Panchayati raj (India).

== List of cities near the village ==
- Bhulath
- Kapurthala
- Phagwara
- Sultanpur Lodhi

== Air travel connectivity ==
The closest International airport to the village is Sri Guru Ram Dass Jee International Airport.
