= Ghanauri Kalan =

Ghanauri Kalan Vaddi Ghanauri
- Village
- Location in Punjab, India Ghanauri Kalan (India)
- Coordinates: 30.423512°N 75.779121°E
- Country: India
- State: Punjab
- District: Sangrur
- Founder: Unknown

Languages
  - Official: Punjabi
- Time zone: UTC+5:30 (IST)
- Postal code: 148024

Ghanauri Kalan is a village in Sangrur District in the Indian State of Punjab. It is one of the biggest villages in Sangrur District by area. The total area of the village is 1696.4 hectares. Ghanauri Kalan is located on Dhuri-Sherpur road, 11 km from sub-district headquarter Dhuri and 26 km from district headquarter Sangrur. According to the Census 2011, Village has population of 5,799 of which 3,068 were males and 2,731 were females.

== Education ==
Ghanauri Kalan has significant number of educational institutes including few elementary schools, one Government High School and one private school known as Himalaya Public School. There are few elementary schools in village in different areas, roughly in every colony of the village. Government High School is the main educational institute in the village that provides education starting from 6th grade. Secondary education includes arts, medical and non-medical streams. This school enrolls students from neighborhood villages every year.

== Sports ==
Youth from the village is engaged in different games like Kabaddi, Cricket and Kho kho. Kabaddi tournaments are organized every year with the help of local residents and people living in other countries. Government High School has Kho-Kho teams for males and females in different age zones. Kulwinder Singh (Kho-Kho and boxing Coach) and Balbir Singh were the people behind success of Kho-Kho teams. Both coaches produced significant number of state level players from the school. They were so successful that sometime most of the players in Punjab State team were from Government School of Ghanauri Kalan.

== Religious sites ==
Village has a large number of religious places like Sikh Gurudwaras, Hindu Temples and Musjid. Ghanauri Kalan is a diverse place with people from different faiths living in a village. Gurudwara Kartarsar Sahib is one of the tallest gurudwaras in Punjab.
