= Manmohan Bawa =

Punjabi writer

Manmohan Bawa ਮਨਮੋਹਨ ਬਾਵਾ
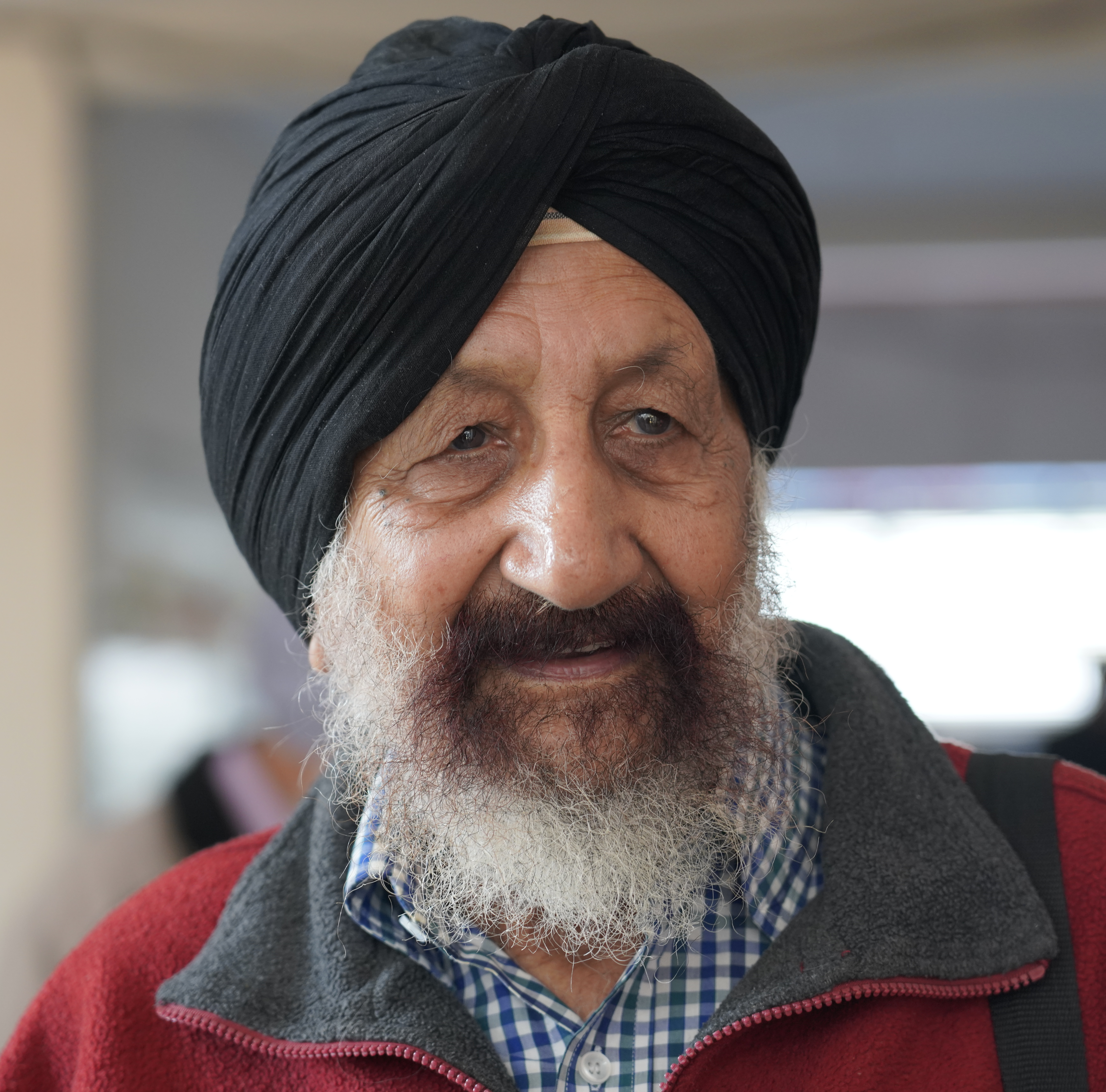
- Manmohan Bawa at People's Literary Festival 2018
- Born: 18 August 1932 (age 94); Amritsar
- Occupations: Novelist, short-story writer, author of maps and travel guides
- Writing career
- Genres: Travel, Novels based on History

Manmohan Bawa (Punjabi: ਮਨਮੋਹਨ ਬਾਵਾ;) is a writer, painter and a cartographer from Punjab and Himachal Pradesh, India. He has written novels, anthologies of short stories, travelogues, travel guides in addition to publishing trekking maps of some Himalayan regions.

== Early life ==
Bawa was born in 1932 in Vairowal Bawian, district Tarn-Taran. He spent first five years in Verowal, and the following five years in Dhuri in erstwhile Patiala state, eventually moving to New Delhi in 1942.

Passing grade 10 in 1947, Bawa went on to get a Master of Art degree in history. Bawa expressed interest in art and travelling from a young age. Due to very hard financial family circumstances, he started working as an apprentice artist at the age of 16. He worked as a graphic artist for 25 years in different presses and firms, including an American firm, beginning in 1948 at a salary of Rs 50 per month. He eventually got tired of working and left the job in 1973.

== Business ==
Along with his brothers, Bawa purchased a hotel to make living and to live a free and full life, pursuing other interests: painting, traveling, trekking in the Himalayas and writing. Though his first book of short story was published in 1962, Bawa only started writing seriously at the age of 55. His interest in writing being history and mythology, his first book of short story, Ajat Sundari, was published in 1990. Along with history the themes of his writing were adivasis and dalits. He published several travelogues, short story collections, novels in Punjabi and one book on history and Indian mythology.

Bawa is also brother of the painter Manjit Bawa.

== Awards ==
- Rupinder Mann Memorial Award
- Kusmanjali Award
- Odisha Sahitya Academy Award

== Bibliography ==
=== Collections of short stories ===
- ਚਿੱਟੇ ਘੋੜੇ ਦਾ ਸਵਾਰ
- ਕਾਲਾ ਕਬੂਤਰ
- ਅਜਾਤ ਸੁੰਦਰੀ
- ਇੱਕ ਰਾਤ
- ਨਰ ਬਲੀ
- ਬਾਦਬਾਨੀ ਕਿਸ਼ਤੀ

=== Novels ===
- 1857 ਦਿੱਲੀ ਦਿੱਲੀ/1857 Delhi Delhi
- ਯੁੱਧ ਨਾਦ/Yudh Naad
- ਯੁਗ ਅੰਤ/Yug Ant
- ਅਫ਼ਗਾਨਿਸਤਾਨ ਦੀ ਉਰਸੁਲਾ / Afghanistan Di Urusula
- ਕਾਲ ਕਥਾ/Kal-Kathaa

=== Travelogues and Travel Guides ===
- Tuseen Vi Chalo Mere Naal
- ਅਣਡਿੱਠੇ ਰਸਤੇ, ਉੱਚੇ ਪਰਬਤ
- ਇੱਕ ਪਰਬਤ ਤੇ ਦੋ ਦਰਿਆ
- ਪਥ ਹੀ ਮੰਜ਼ਿਲ ਹੈ
- ਜੰਗਲ ਜੰਗਲ ਪਰਬਤ ਪਰਬਤ
- ਆਓ ਚਲੀਏ ਬਰਫ਼ਾਂ ਦੇ ਪਾਰ
- 20,000 ਮੀਲ ਲੰਬੀ ਦੇਸ਼ ਕਾਲ ਯਾਤਰਾ
- Adventures in the Snows
- Adventures in the Mountains
- A Touring and Trekking Guide to the Indian Himalayas
- Himachal Pradesh

=== Other works ===
- ਭਾਰਤੀ ਇਤਿਹਾਸ ਮਿਥਿਹਾਸ
