= Kapurthala district =

- District of Punjab
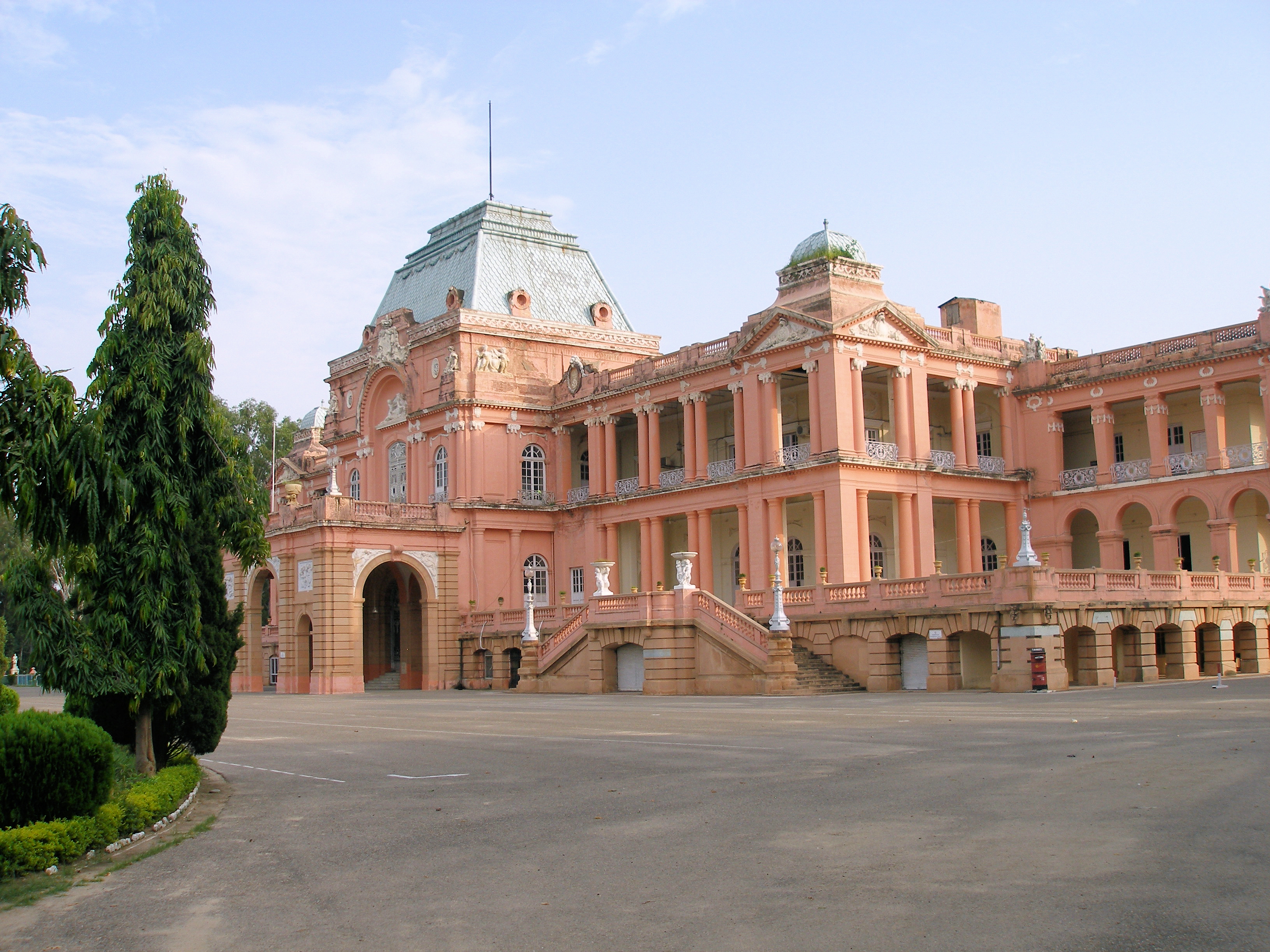
- Kapurthala Sainik School, former palace of the Maharajas of Kapurthala

- Location in Punjab
- Coordinates: 31°22′46″N 75°23′05″E
- Country: India
- State: Punjab
- Named for: Nawab Kapur Singh
- Headquarters: Kapurthala

Government
  - Deputy commissioner: D P S Kharbanda IAS

Area
  - Total: 1,633 km^{2} (631 sq mi)

Population (2011)
  - Total: 815,168
  - Density: 499.2/km^{2} (1,293/sq mi)

Languages
  - Official: Punjabi
- Time zone: UTC+5:30 (IST)
- Vehicle registration: PB-09
- Literacy: 80.20%
- Website: www.kapurthala.gov.in

Kapurthala District is a district of the state of Punjab in northern India. The city of Kapurthala is the district's headquarters. The district is part of the Jalandhar division.

Kapurthala District is one of the smallest districts of Punjab in terms of both area and population, with 815,168 people by the 2011 census. The district is divided into two noncontiguous parts—the main Kapurthala-Sultanpur Lodhi portion and the Phagwara tehsil.

The Kapurthala-Sultanpur Lodhi part lies between north latitude 31° 07' and 31° 22' and east longitude 75° 36'. In the north it is bound by Hoshiarpur, Gurdaspur, and Amritsar districts, in the west by the Beas River and Amritsar district, and in south by the Sutlej River, Jalandhar district, and Hoshiaripur district.

Phagwara tehsil lies between north latitude 31° 22' and east longitude 75° 40' and 75° 55'. Phagwara lies on the National Highway No 1, and the tehsil is much more industrially developed than the remainder of Kapurthala District. Phagwara is situated at a distance of 19 kilometres (12 mi) southeast of Jalandhar, and the tehsil is bounded on two sides by Jalandhar District whereas north by Hoshiarpur district and east by S B S Nagar District.

The district has three subdivisions/tehsils: Kapurthala, Phagwara, and Sultanpur Lodhi. The total area of the district is 1,633 km (1,015 mi) of which 909.09 km^{2} (351.00 sq mi) is in Kapurthala tehsil, 304.05 km^{2} (117.39 sq mi) is in Phagwara tehsil and 451.0 km^{2} (174.1 sq mi) is in Sultanpur Lodhi tehsil. The economy of the district is still predominantly agricultural.

== Demographics ==
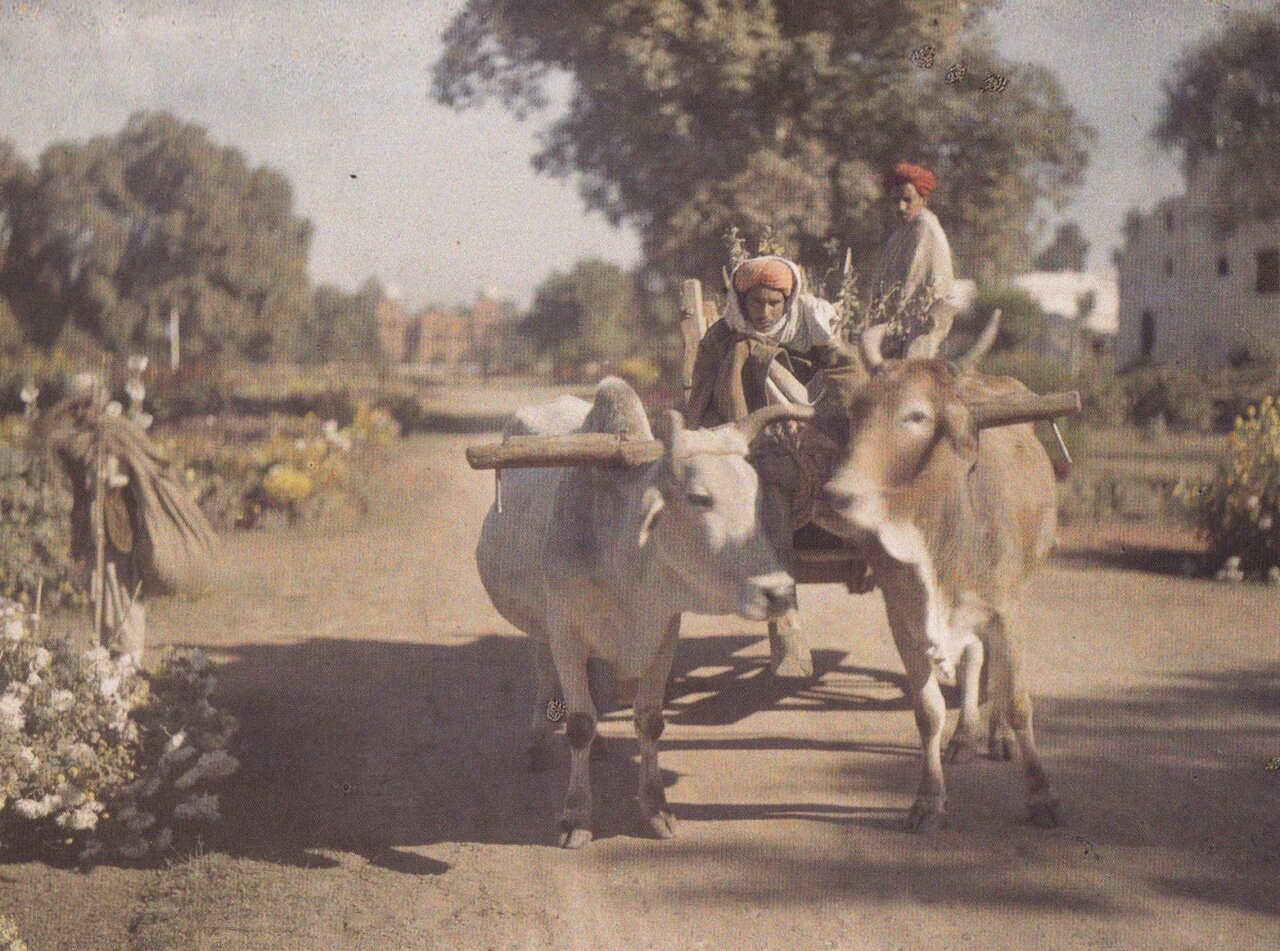
Photograph of rural life in Kapurthala in 1927, a true-colour photograph taken by Albert Kahn

According to the 2011 census Kapurthala district has a population of 815,168, roughly equal to the nation of Comoros or the US state of South Dakota. This gives it a ranking of 481st in India (out of a total of 640). The district has a population density of 501 inhabitants per square kilometre (1,300/sq mi). Its population growth rate over the decade 2001-2011 was 8.37%. Kapurthala has a sex ratio of 912 females for every 1000 males, and a literacy rate of 80.2%. Scheduled Castes made up 33.94% of the population.

Historical population
Year	Pop.	±% p.a.
1951	295,071	—
1961	343,778	+1.54%
1971	429,514	+2.25%
1981	545,249	+2.41%
1991	646,647	+1.72%
2001	754,521	+1.55%
2011	815,168	+0.78%

=== Gender ===
The table below shows the sex ratio of Kapurthala district through decades.

Sex ratio of Kapurthala district
Census year	Ratio
2011	912
2001	887
1991	896
1981	898
1971	889
1961	886
1951	880

The table below shows the child sex ratio of children below the age of 6 years in the rural and urban areas of Kapurthala district.

Child sex ratio of children below the age of 6 years in Kapurthala district
Year	Urban	Rural
2011	896	859
2001	792	782

=== Religions ===
Religion in Kapurthala district (2011)
Religion	Percent
Sikhism	55.66%
Hinduism	41.23%
Islam	1.25%
Buddhism	0.82%
Christianity	0.66%
Other or not stated	0.38%

Religion in tehsils of Kapurthala district (2011)
Tehsil	Sikhism (%)	Hinduism (%)	Islam (%)	Others (%)
Bhulath	78.10	18.88	0.86	2.16
Kapurthala	60.88	36.72	1.44	0.96
Sultanpur Lodhi	75.83	23.17	0.33	0.67
Phagwara	29.05	65.80	1.6	3.55

Sikhs are the majority in Kapurthala district, and dominate rural areas. Hindus are the majority in urban areas.

The table below shows the population of different religions in absolute numbers in the urban and rural areas of Kapurthala district.

Absolute numbers of different religious groups in Kapurthala district
Religion	Urban (2011)	Rural (2011)	Urban (2001)	Rural (2001)	Urban (1991)	Rural (1991)
Hindu	183,623	152,501	150,751	135,687	106,614	104,987
Sikh	89,331	364,361	89,421	359,233	55,075	263,070
Muslim	3,965	6,225	2,461	3,947	573	2,156
Christian	1,900	3,545	1,406	2,947	566	1,302
Other religions	3,643	6,074	2,488	6,180	590	316

Religious groups in Kapurthala District (British Punjab province era)
Religious group	1881		1891		1901		1911		1921		1931		1941	
Religious group	Pop.	%	Pop.	%	Pop.	%	Pop.	%	Pop.	%	Pop.	%	Pop.	%
Islam	142,974	56.6%	170,557	56.91%	178,326	56.73%	152,117	56.73%	160,457	56.44%	179,251	56.59%	213,754	56.49%
Hinduism (Note: 1931-1941: Including Ad-Dharmis)	82,900	32.82%	89,463	29.85%	93,652	29.79%	61,426	22.91%	58,412	20.55%	64,319	20.31%	61,546	16.27%
Sikhism	26,493	10.49%	39,493	13.18%	42,101	13.39%	54,275	20.24%	64,074	22.54%	72,177	22.79%	88,350	23.35%
Jainism	214	0.08%	169	0.06%	226	0.07%	205	0.08%	228	0.08%	27	0.01%	380	0.1%
Christianity	35	0.01%	8	0%	39	0.01%	107	0.04%	1,100	0.39%	983	0.31%	1,667	0.44%
Buddhism	1	0%	0	0%	3	0%	0	0%	0	0%	0	0%	0	0%
Zoroastrianism	0	0%	0	0%	4	0%	3	0%	4	0%	0	0%	6	0%
Judaism	—N/a	—N/a	0	0%	0	0%	0	0%	0	0%	0	0%	0	0%
Others	0	0%	0	0%	0	0%	0	0%	0	0%	0	0%	12,677	3.35%
Total population	252,617	100%	299,690	100%	314,351	100%	268,133	100%	284,275	100%	316,757	100%	378,380	100%
Note1: British Punjab province era district borders are not an exact match in the present-day due to various bifurcations to district borders — which since created new districts — throughout the historic Punjab Province region during the post-independence era that have taken into account population increases. Note2: British Punjab province era figures are for Kapurthala State.

=== Language ===
Languages of Kapurthala district (2011)
1. Punjabi (91.2%)
2. Hindi (7.23%)
3. Others (1.57%)

At the time of the 2011 census, 91.20% of the population spoke Punjabi and 7.23% Hindi as their first language.

== Administration ==
=== Subdistricts of Kapurthala district ===
According to the Indian government's integrated online directory, Kapurthala district is divided into the following subdistricts (tehsils/subdivisions) and blocks:

- Subdistricts
  1. Bhulath
  2. Kapurthala
  3. Phagwara
  4. Sultanpur Lodhi
- Blocks:
  1. Dhilwan
  2. Kapurthala
  3. Nadala
  4. Phagwara
  5. Sultanpur Lodhi

== Economy ==
The income of Municipalities and Municipal corporations in Kapurthala district from municipal rates and taxes in the year 2018 was 459,777 thousand rupees.

In 2010–11, there were 4,305 registered Micro and Small Enterprise (MSE) units in Kapurthala district, which provided employment to 22,678 people. There were 5 registered Medium and Large industrial units, which provided employment to 17,000 people. In February 2023, Kapurthala district was declared second best across Punjab in giving timely approval to new industries and promoting investment by creating good environment for the establishment of new commercial industrial units.

== Health ==
According to the National Blindness and Visual Survey India 2015–19, 11.53% people in Kapurthala district above the age of 50 were visually impaired. In April 2023, Parhar hospital in Phagwara became the first hospital in Punjab to get advanced technology for Robot Joint Replacement Surgeries.

The table below shows the data from the district nutrition profile of children below the age of 5 years, in Kapurthala, as of year 2020.

District nutrition profile of children under 5 years of age in Kapurthala, year 2020
Indicators	Number of children (<5 years)	Percent (2020)	Percent (2016)
Stunted	13,534	28%	35%
Wasted	4,931	10%	23%
Severely wasted	1,328	3%	11%
Underweight	9,973	21%	27%
Overweight/obesity	1,313	3%	1%
Anemia	32,889	76%	61%
Total children	48,111		

The table below shows the district nutrition profile of Kapurthala of women between the ages of 15 and 49 years, as of year 2020.

District nutritional profile of Kapurthala of women of 15–49 years, in 2020
Indicators	Number of women (15–49 years)	Percent (2020)	Percent (2016)
Underweight (BMI <18.5 kg/m^2)	31,663	16%	11%
Overweight/obesity	76,581	39%	24%
Hypertension	50,788	26%	12%
Diabetes	29,369	15%	NA
Anemia (non-preg)	123,249	63%	43%
Anemia (preg)	6,298	58%	27%
Total women (preg)	10,907		
Total women	194,368		

The table below shows the current use of family planning methods by currently married women between the ages of 15 and 49 years, in Kapurthala district.

Family planning methods used by women between the ages of 15 and 49 years, in Kapurthala district
Method	Total (2019–21)	Total (2015–16)	Urban (2015–16)	Rural (2015–16)
Female sterilization	22.1%	40.4%	37.8%	41.9%
Male sterilization	0.8%	0.7%	1.4%	0.3%
IUD/PPIUD	1.6%	4.3%	6.0%	3.4%
Pill	1.6%	1.9%	1.9%	1.9%
Condom	20.5%	17.6%	20.6%	15.9%
Any modern method	47.2%	65.0%	67.6%	63.5%
Any method	61.0%	70.0%	71.7%	69.1%
Total unmet need	13.4%	8.2%	7.8%	8.5%
Unmet need for spacing	4.4%	1.5%	2.0%	1.2%

The table below shows the number of road accidents and people affected in Kapurthala district by year.

Road accidents and people affected in Kapurthala district by year
Year	Accidents	Killed	Injured	Vehicles Involved
2022	136	118	62	185
2021	134	102	38	148
2020	144	121	65	122
2019	213	184	81	158

== Politics ==
No.	Constituency	Name of MLA	Party	Bench
26	Bholath	Sukhpal Singh Khaira	Indian National Congress	Opposition
27	Kapurthala	Rana Gurjeet Singh	Indian National Congress	Opposition
28	Sultanpur Lodhi	Rana Inder Pratap Singh	Independent politician	Opposition
29	Phagwara (SC)	Balwinder Singh Dhaliwal	Indian National Congress	Opposition

== Notable people ==
- Kartar Singh Thind, a botanist
- Purshottam Das Jalota, a classical and devotional music singer, best known for his bhajans and receiver of Padam Shri award
