= Sadhu Singh (disambiguation) =

Sadhu Singh may refer to:

- Sadhu Singh, MP from Punjab
- Sadhu Singh (athlete)
- Sadhu Singh Dharamsot, Congress politician
- Sadhu Singh Hamdard, Punjabi poet
- Sadhu Singh Thind (born 1972), Indian musician
- Sandhu Singh Gurbir
