= Udham Singh =

Indian revolutionary (1899–1940)

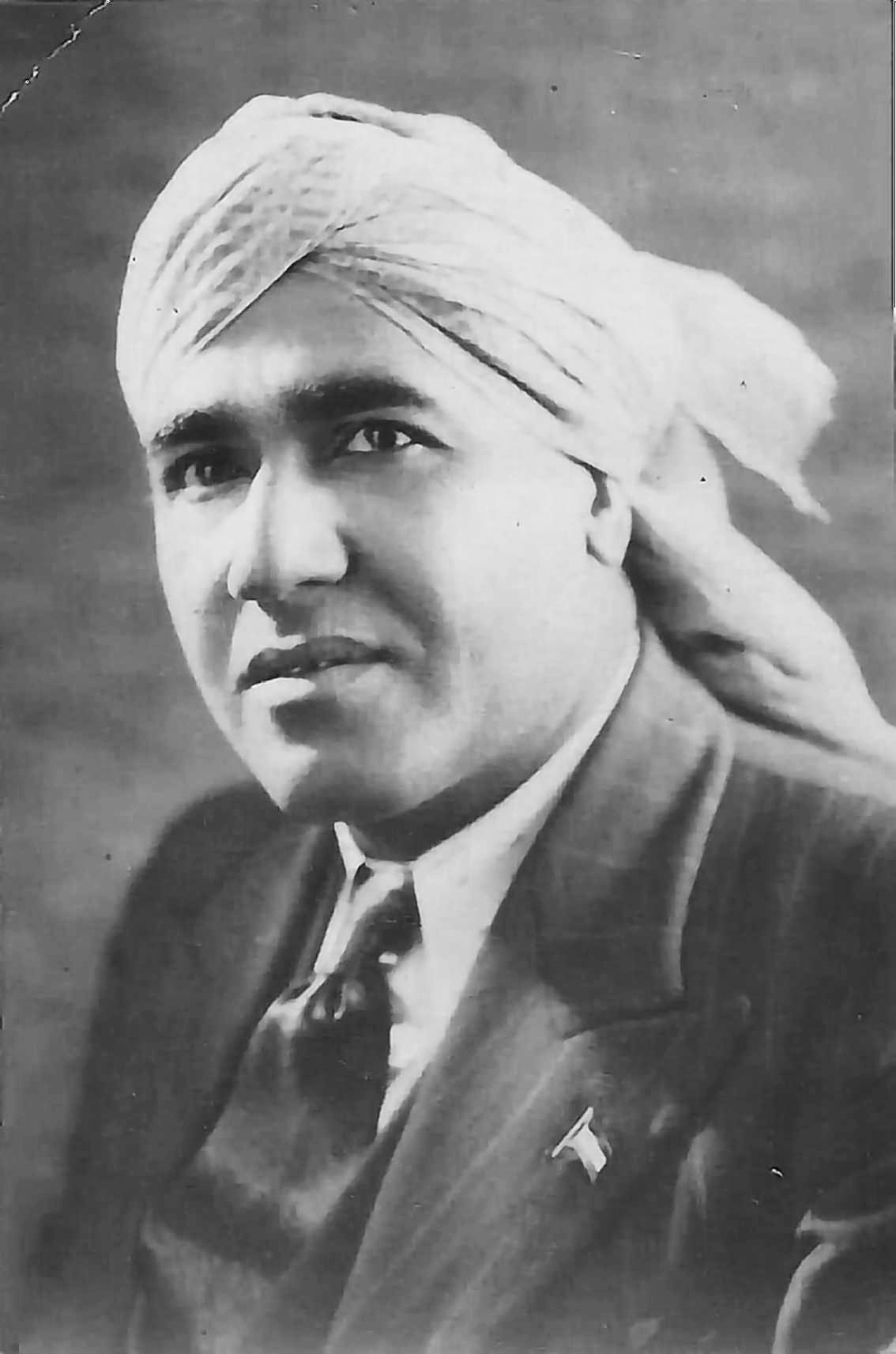
- Born: Sher Singh; 26 December 1899; Sunam, Punjab Province, British Raj
- Died: 31 July 1940 (aged 40); Pentonville Prison, London, England
- Other names: Ram Mohammad Singh Azad, Ude, Shaheed-i-Azam Sardar Udham Singh
- Occupation: Revolutionary
- Organization(s): Ghadar Party; Hindustan Socialist Republican Association; Indian Workers' Association
- Known for: Assassinating Michael O'Dwyer in retaliation for the Jallianwala Bagh massacre
- Movement: Indian independence movement
- Spouse: Lupe Hernandez
- Children: 2 sons
- Status: Executed by hanging
- Conviction: Murder
- Penalty: Death

Details
- Victims: Michael O'Dwyer, 75

Signature
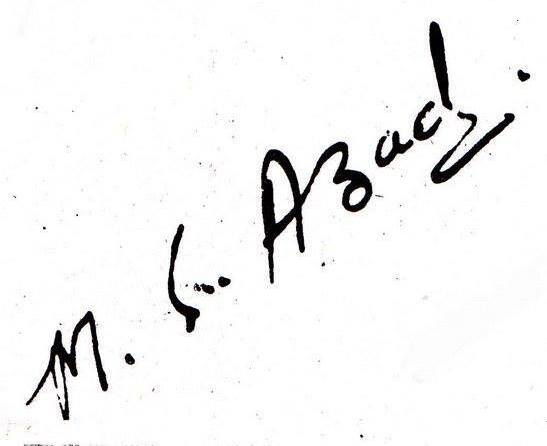

Udham Singh (born Sher Singh; 26 December 1899 – 31 July 1940) was an Indian revolutionary belonging to Ghadar Party and HSRA, best known for assassinating Michael O'Dwyer, the former lieutenant governor of the Punjab in British India, on 13 March 1940. The assassination was done in revenge for the Jallianwala Bagh massacre in Amritsar in 1919, for which O'Dwyer was responsible and of which Singh himself was a survivor. Singh was subsequently tried and convicted of murder and hanged in July 1940. While in custody, he used the name Ram Mohammad Singh Azad, which represents the three major religions in India and his anti-colonial sentiment.

Singh was a well-known figure of the Indian independence movement. He is also referred to as Shaheed-i-Azam Sardar Udham Singh (the expression "Shaheed-i-Azam" means "the great martyr"). A district (Udham Singh Nagar) was named after him as a homage by the Mayawati government in October 1995.

== Early life ==
Udham Singh was born Sher Singh into a Sikh family on 26 December 1899 in the neighbourhood of Pilbad in Sunam, around 130 miles south of Lahore, British India, to Tehal Singh, a Kamboj, low-skilled low-paid manual labourer and his wife Narain Kaur. He was their youngest, with a two-year difference between him and his elder brother, Sadhu. When they were around age three and five respectively, their mother died. The two boys subsequently stayed close to their father while he worked in the village of Nilowal carrying mud from a newly constructed canal, part of Punjab Canal Colonies. After being laid off he found work as a railway crossing watchman in the village of Uppli.

In October 1907, while taking his sons by foot to Amritsar, their father collapsed and died at Ram Bagh Hospital. The two brothers were subsequently handed to an uncle who being unable to keep them, gave them to the Central Khalsa Orphanage, where according to the orphanage register, they were initiated on 28 October. Rebaptised, Sadhu became “Mukta”, meaning “one who has escaped re-incarnation”, and Sher Singh was renamed “Udham Singh”, Udham meaning “the upheaval”. At the orphanage he was affectionately referred to as "Ude". In 1917, Mukta died of an unknown sudden illness.

Shortly thereafter, despite being below the official age of enrolment, Udham Singh persuaded authorities to allow him to serve in the British Indian Army during the First World War. He was subsequently attached to the lowest ranking labour unit with the 32nd Sikh Pioneers to work on restoration on the field railway from the coast up to Basra. His young age and conflicts with authority led him to return to Punjab in less than six months. In 1918, he rejoined the army and was despatched to Basra and then Baghdad, where he carried out carpentry and general maintenance of machinery and vehicles, returning after a year to the orphanage in Amritsar in early 1919.

== Massacre at Jallianwala Bagh ==
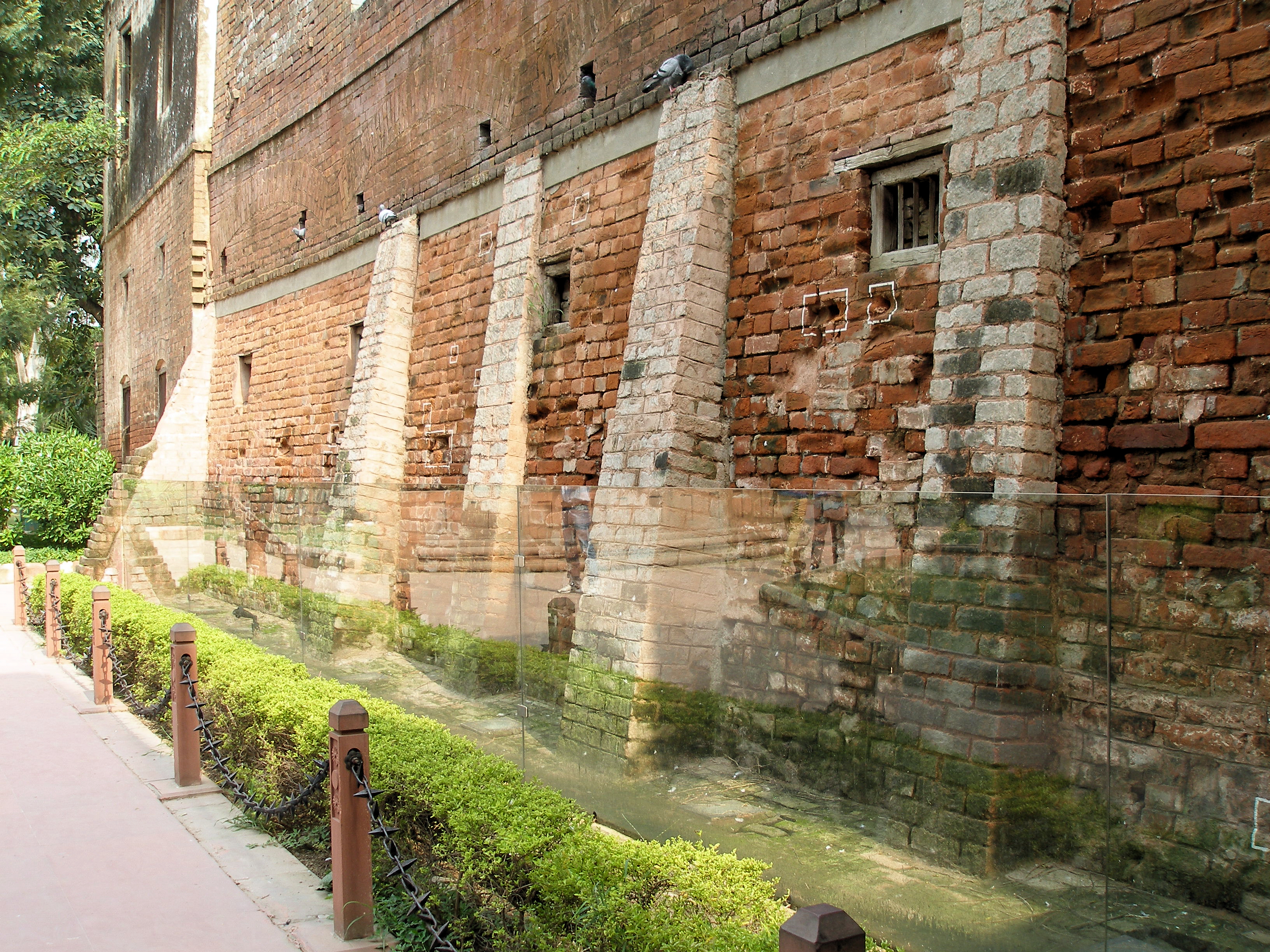
Bullet marks, visible on preserved walls, at present-day Jallianwala Bagh

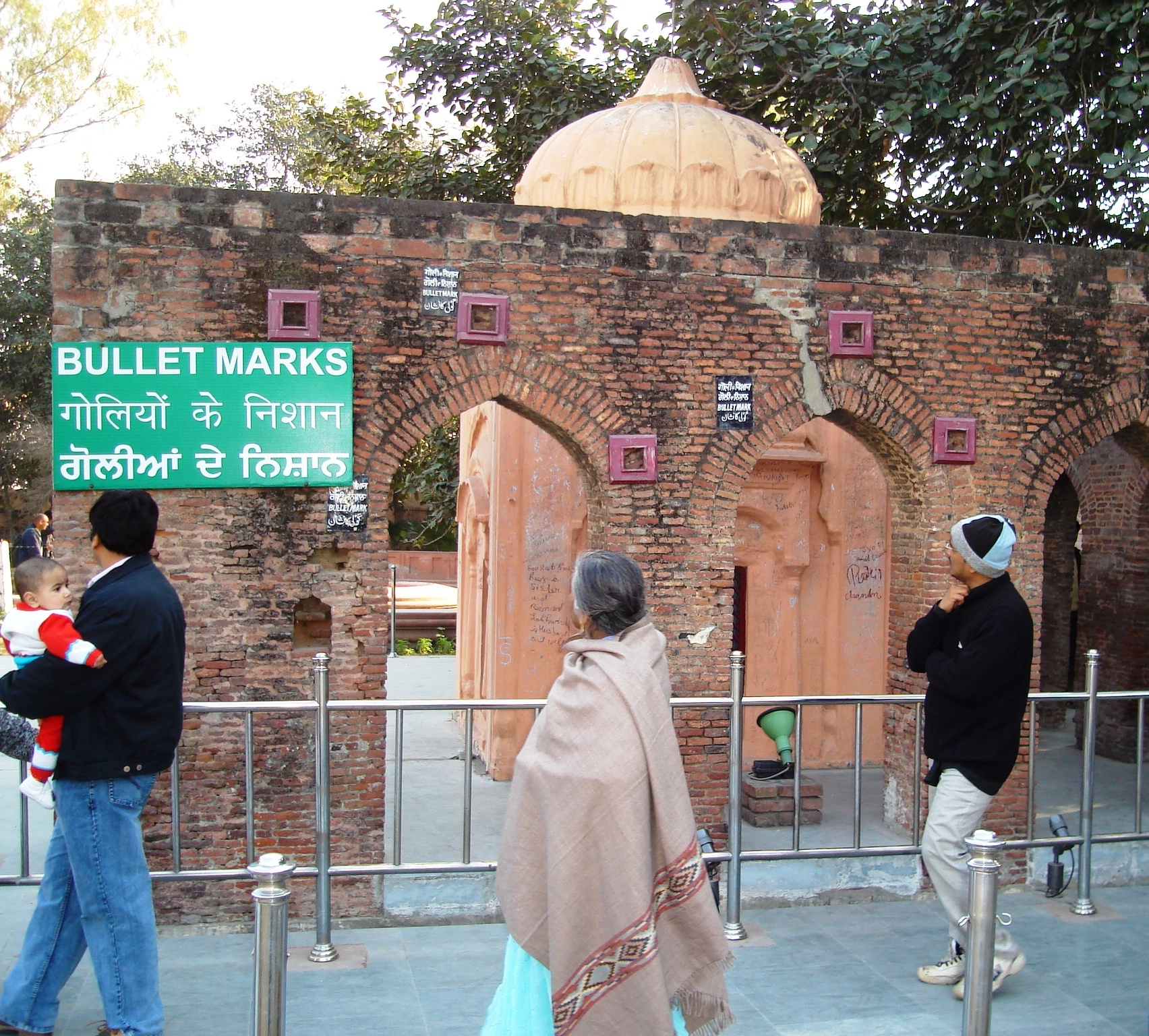

On 10 April 1919, a number of local leaders allied to the Indian National Congress, including Satyapal and Saifuddin Kitchlew, were arrested under the terms of the Rowlatt Act. A military picket fired on a protesting crowd, precipitating a riot which saw numerous European-owned banks attacked and several Europeans attacked in the streets. On 13 April, over twenty thousand unarmed people were assembled in Jallianwala Bagh, Amritsar to celebrate the important Sikh festival of Baisakhi, and to peacefully protest the arrests. Singh and his friends from the orphanage were serving water to the crowd. Troops under the command of Colonel Reginald Dyer opened fire on the crowd, killing several hundred; this became known variously as the Amritsar Massacre or the Jallianwala Bagh massacre.

Singh became involved in revolutionary politics and was deeply influenced by Bhagat Singh and his revolutionary group. In 1924, Singh became involved with the Ghadar Party, organising Indians overseas towards overthrowing colonial rule. In 1927, he returned to India on orders from Bhagat Singh, bringing 25 associates as well as revolvers and ammunition. Soon after, he was arrested for possession of unlicensed arms. Revolvers, ammunition, and copies of a prohibited Ghadar Party paper called "Ghadr-di-Gunj" ("Voice of Revolt") were confiscated. He was prosecuted and sentenced to five years in prison.

Upon his release from prison in 1931, Singh's movements were under constant surveillance by the Punjab Police. He made his way to Kashmir, where he was able to evade the police and escape to Germany. In 1934, he reached London, where he found employment. Privately, he formed plans to assassinate Michael O'Dwyer. In Singh's diaries for 1939 and 1940, he occasionally misspells O'Dwyer's surname as "O'Dyer", leaving a possibility he may have confused O'Dwyer with General Dyer. However, General Dyer had died in 1927, even before Udham Singh had planned the revenge. In England, Singh was affiliated to the Indian Workers' Association in Coventry and attended their meetings.

== Shooting at Caxton Hall ==
On 13 March 1940, Michael O'Dwyer was scheduled to speak at a joint meeting of the East India Association and the Central Asian Society (now Royal Society for Asian Affairs) at Caxton Hall, London. Singh had entered the event with a ticket in his wife's name. Singh concealed a revolver inside a book, which had pages cut in the shape of a revolver. This revolver was purchased by him from a soldier in a pub. Then he entered the hall and found an empty seat. As the meeting concluded, Singh shot O'Dwyer twice as he moved towards the speaking platform. One of these bullets passed through O'Dwyer's heart and right lung, killing him almost instantly. Others wounded in the shooting were Louis Dane; Lawrence Dundas, 2nd Marquess of Zetland; and Charles Cochrane-Baillie, 2nd Baron Lamington. Singh was arrested immediately after the shooting and the pistol seized as evidence (it was later transferred to the Crime Museum, where it remains).

== Personal life ==
Singh married a Mexican woman, Lupe Hernandez, in the 1920s, by whom he fathered two sons. In 1927 he left the United States, leaving Hernandez and their two sons behind. Many other Indian men in the States took Hispanic wives due to the Johnson-Reed (Immigration) Act of 1924, as they would otherwise have been expelled. According to some of his relatives, Singh later took an English wife as well. It is not known if he had children with her too.

== Murder, trial, and execution ==
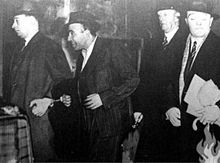
Singh (second from the left) being taken from Caxton Hall after the assassination of Michael O'Dwyer

On 1 April 1940, Singh was formally charged with the murder of Michael O'Dwyer, and remanded in custody at Brixton Prison. Initially asked to explain his motivations, Singh stated:

"I did it because I had a grudge against him. He deserved it. I don't belong to society or anything else. I don't care. I don't mind dying. What is the use of waiting until you get old? ... Is Zetland dead? He ought to be. I put two into him. I bought the revolver from a soldier in a public house. My parents died when I was three or four. Only one dead? I thought I could get more."

While in custody, he called himself Ram Mohammad Singh Azad: the first three words of the name reflect the three major religious communities of Punjab (Hindu, Muslim, and Sikh); the last word azad (literally "free") reflects his anti-colonial sentiment.

While awaiting his trial, Singh went on a 42-day hunger strike, before finally being force fed. On 4 June 1940, his trial commenced at the Central Criminal Court, Old Bailey, before Justice Cyril Atkinson, with V.K. Krishna Menon and St John Hutchinson representing him. G. B. McClure was the prosecuting barrister. When asked about his motivation, Singh explained:

I did it because I had a grudge against him. He deserved it. He was the real culprit. He wanted to crush the spirit of my people, so I have crushed him. For full 21 years, I have been trying to seek vengeance. I am happy that I have done the job. I am not scared of death. I am dying for my country. I have seen my people starving in India under the British rule. I have protested against this, it was my duty.

Singh was convicted of murder and sentenced to death. On 31 July 1940, Singh was hanged at Pentonville Prison by Stanley Cross. His remains are preserved at the Jallianwala Bagh in Amritsar, Punjab. On every 31 July, marches are held in Sunam (Singh's hometown) by various organisations and every statue of Singh in the city is paid tribute with flower garlands.

=== Singh's speech ===
Following his conviction, he made a speech which the judge directed should not be released to the press. However, political activists who had set up the Shaheed Udham Singh Trust and working with the Indian Workers Association (GB), ran a campaign to have the court record of his statement published along with other material. This proved successful in 1996, when his speech was published along with three further files covering the trial, and the Ghadar Directory, a document compiled by British intelligence in 1934 detailing 792 people regarded as a threat including Udham Singh.

He started the speech with a denunciation of British Imperialism:

"I say down with British Imperialism. You say India do not have peace. We have only slavery. Generations of so called civilisation has brought us everything filthy and degenerating. known to the human race. All you have to do is read your own history. If you have any human decency about you, you should die with shame. The brutality and blood thirsty way in which the so called intellectuals who call themselves rulers of civilisation in the world are bastard blood . . ."

At this point he was interrupted by the judge, but after some discussion he continued:

"I do not care about sentence of death. It means nothing at all. I do not care about dying or anything. I do not worry about it at all. I am dying for a purpose." Thumping the rail of the dock, he exclaimed, "We are suffering from the British Empire. (He continued more quietly) I am not afraid to die. I am proud to die, to have to free my native land and I hope that when I am gone, I hope that in my place will come thousands of my countrymen to drive you dirty dogs out; to free my country."

"I am standing before an English jury. I am in an English court. You people go to India and when you come back you are given a prize and put in the House of Commons. We come to England and we are sentenced to death."

"I never meant anything; but I will take it. I do not care anything about it, but when you dirty dogs come to India there comes a time when you will be cleaned out of India. All your British Imperialism will be smashed."

"Machine guns on the streets of India mow down thousands of poor women and children wherever your so-called flag of democracy and Christianity flies."

"Your conduct, your conduct – I am talking about the British government. I have nothing against the English people at all. I have more English friends living in England than I have in India. I have great sympathy with the workers of England. I am against the Imperialist Government."

"You people are suffering the same as I am suffering through those dirty dogs and mad beasts. Everyone are suffering through these dirty dogs; these mad beasts. India is only slavery. Killing, mutilating and destroying – British Imperialism. People do not read about it in the papers. We know what is going on in India."

At this point, the judge refused to hear any more, but Singh continued:

"You ask me what I have to say. I am saying it. Because you people are dirty. You do not want to hear from us what you are doing in India."

He then thrust his glasses back into his pocket, and exclaimed three words in Hindustani and then shouted:

"Down with British Imperialism! Down with British dirty dogs!"

He turned to leave the dock, spitting across the solicitor's table.

When this material was published, it was reported in both British and Asian press, the statement was translated into Gurmukhi script and distributed at the Sikh Vaisaki Festival in Birmingham, April 1997. John Major, the British prime minister at that time, remarked: "The Amritsar Massacre was an unhappy episode in Indo-British relations which was controversial in both countries. Today [8 October 1996] I am glad to say, our relationship is excellent. India is an important partner and a close friend of this country."

== Reactions ==
In its 18 March 1940 issue, Amrita Bazar Patrika wrote, "O'Dwyer's name is connected with Punjab incidents which India will never forget". The Punjab section of Congress in the Punjab Assembly led by Dewan Chaman Lal refused to vote for the Premier's motion to condemn the assassination. In April 1940, at the Annual Session of the All India Congress Committee held in commemoration of 21st anniversary of the Jallianwala Bagh Massacre, the youth wing of the Indian National Congress Party displayed revolutionary slogans in support of Singh, applauding his action as patriotic and heroic.

Singh had some support from the international press. The Times of London called him a "fighter for freedom", his actions "an expression of the pent-up fury of the downtrodden Indian people." Bergeret from Rome praised Singh's action as courageous. In March 1940, Indian National Congress leader Jawaharlal Nehru, condemned the action of Singh as senseless, however, in 1962, Nehru reversed his stance and applauded Singh with the following published statement: "I salute Shaheed-i-Azam Udham Singh with reverence who had kissed the noose so that we may be free."

== Repatriation of remains ==
In 1974, Singh's remains were exhumed and repatriated to India at the request of MLA Sadhu Singh Thind and cremated in his home village of Sunam. The casket was received by Indira Gandhi, Shankar Dayal Sharma and Zail Singh. On 2 August 1974 his ashes were divided into seven urns and distributed; one each to Haridwar, Kiratpur Sahib, Rauza Sharif, Sunam and the museum at Jallianwala Bagh, and two urns to the library of the Shaheed Udham Singh Arts College in Sunam.

== Legacy ==
Udham Singh
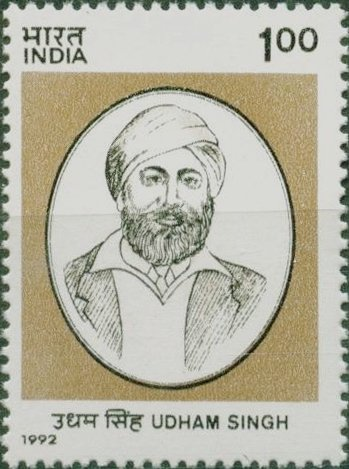
- SARDAR UDHAM SINGH
- Type: Commemorative
- Country of issue: India
- Date of issue: 31 Jul 1992
- Face value: INR 1.00

In 1999, during the tercentenary of the creation of the Khalsa and the centenary of Singh's birth, he was posthumously awarded the "Nishan-e-Khalsa" by the Anandpur Sahib Foundation.

- A museum dedicated to Singh is located in Amritsar, near Jallianwala Bagh.
- Singh's ancestral house, in Sunam, has been converted into a museum. 30 letters and other objects are on display in the museum.
- The official name of his ancestral town Sunam was changed to 'Sunam Udham Singh Wala'.
- Singh has been the subject of a number of films: Jallian Wala Bagh, Sarfarosh: The Story of Shaheed Uddham Singh (1976), Shaheed Uddham Singh (film) (1999) and Sardar Udham (2021).
- Udham Singh himself acted in two British films while staying in the UK to complete his mission. Elephant Boy (1937) and The Four Feathers (1939).
- Udham Singh Nagar district in Uttarakhand is named after Singh.
- Singh is the subject of the 1998 track "Assassin" by Asian Dub Foundation.
- "Frank Brazil", is named after an Alias of Singh, is a track by The Ska Vengers.
- Shaheed Udham Singh Chowk in Anupgarh was named for him.
- The day of his death is a public holiday in Punjab and Haryana.
- A statue of him was installed by International Sarav Kamboj Samaj at the main entrance of Jallianwala Bagh, Amritsar on 13 March 2018. The statue was unveiled by Union Home Minister Rajnath Singh.
Ashes of Shaheed Udham Singh at Jallianwala Bagh museum
