= Sultanpur Lodhi Assembly constituency =

Legislative Assembly constituency in Punjab State, India

Coordinates: 31.22°N 75.2°E

Sultanpur Lodhi
- Constituency No. 28 for the Punjab Legislative Assembly

Constituency details
- Country: India
- State: Punjab
- District: Kapurthala
- Lok Sabha constituency: Khadoor Sahib
- Total electors: 148,501
- Reservation: None

Member of Legislative Assembly
- 16th Punjab Legislative Assembly
- Incumbent Rana Inder Pratap Singh
- Party: Independent politician
- Elected year: 2022

Sultanpur Lodhi Assembly constituency is one of the 117 Legislative Assembly constituencies of Punjab state in India. It is part of Kapurthala district.

== Members of the Legislative Assembly ==
Most successful parties from Sultanpur Lodhi Vidhan Sabha
1. SAD (9 Times) (52.9%)
2. INC (7 Times) (41.2%)
3. IND (1 Time) (5.88%)

Election	Name	Party
As part of PEPSU Legislative Assembly (1951–56)
1952	Atma Singh	Shiromani Akali Dal
1954	Atma Singh	Shiromani Akali Dal
As part of Punjab Legislative Assembly (1956–Present)
1957	Atama Singh	Indian National Congress
1962	Balwant Singh	Indian National Congress
1967	Balwant Singh	Indian National Congress
1969	Atma Singh	Shiromani Akali Dal
1972	Sadhu Singh Thind	Indian National Congress
1977	Atma Singh	Shiromani Akali Dal
1980	Atma Singh	Shiromani Akali Dal
1985	Bachan Singh	Shiromani Akali Dal
1992	Gurmail Singh	Indian National Congress
1997	Upinderjit Kaur	Shiromani Akali Dal
2002	Upinderjit Kaur	Shiromani Akali Dal
2007	Upinderjit Kaur	Shiromani Akali Dal
2012	Navtej Singh Cheema	Indian National Congress
2017	Navtej Singh Cheema	Indian National Congress
2022	Rana Inder Pratap Singh	Independent politician

== Election results ==
=== 2027 ===
Punjab Assembly election, 2027: Sultanpur Lodhi
Party	Candidate	Votes	%	±%
AAP				
AD (WPD)				New entry
INC				
BSP				
SAD				
BJP				New entry
NOTA	None of the above			
Majority				
Turnout				

=== 2022 ===
Punjab Assembly election, 2022:Sultanpur Lodhi
Party	Candidate	Votes	%	±%
Independent	Rana Inder Pratap Singh	41,337	38.24	New
AAP	Sajjan Singh Cheema	29,903	27.66	▲1.86
SAD	Harminder Singh	17,468	16.16	▼14.94
INC	Navtej Singh Cheema	13,459	12.45	▼26.15
SAD(A)	Mukhtiar Singh	3,049	2.82	
NOTA	None of the above	741	0.69	
Majority		11,434	10.58	
Turnout		108,106	72.8	
Registered electors		148,499		
Independent gain from INC		Swing		

=== 2017 ===
Punjab Assembly election, 2017: Sultanpur Lodhi
Party	Candidate	Votes	%	±%
INC	Navtej Singh Cheema	41,843	38.6	▼9.7
SAD	Upinderjit Kaur	33,681	31.1	▼12.9
AAP	Sajjan Singh Cheema	28,017	25.80	New
NOTA	None of the above	616	0.4	
Majority		8,162	7.60	
Turnout		107,866	76.90	
Registered electors		141,015		

=== 2012 ===
Punjab Assembly election, 2012: Sultanpur Lodhi
Party	Candidate	Votes	%	±%
INC	Navtej Singh Cheema	47,933	48.3	
SAD	Upinderjit Kaur	43,635	44.0	
Majority		4,298	4.30	
Turnout		99,045	80.8	
Registered electors		122,525		

== See also ==
- List of constituencies of the Punjab Legislative Assembly
- Kapurthala district
