= Kapurthala Assembly constituency =

Legislative Assembly constituency in Punjab State, India

Coordinates: 31.38°N 75.39°E

Kapurthala
- Constituency No. 27 for the Punjab Legislative Assembly

Constituency details
- Country: India
- State: Punjab
- District: Kapurthala
- Lok Sabha constituency: Khadoor Sahib
- Total electors: 149,885 (in 2022)
- Reservation: None

Member of Legislative Assembly
- 16th Punjab Legislative Assembly
- Incumbent Rana Gurjeet Singh
- Party: Indian National Congress
- Elected year: 2022

Kapurthala is one of the 117 Legislative Assembly constituencies of Punjab state in India. It is part of Kapurthala district. As of 2022, it is represented by Rana Gurjeet Singh of the Indian National Congress.

== Members of the Legislative Assembly ==
Most successful parties from Kapurthala Vidhan Sabha
1. INC (13 Times) (72.2%)
2. SAD (4 Times) (22.2%)
3. JP (1 Time) (5.56%)

Year	Name	Party
As part of PEPSU Legislative Assembly (1951–56)
1952	Thakar Singh	Indian National Congress
1954	Thakar Singh	Indian National Congress
As part of Punjab Legislative Assembly (1956–Present)
1957	Harnam Singh	Indian National Congress
1962	Lakhi Singh	Shiromani Akali Dal
1967	K. Singh	Indian National Congress
1969	Bawa Harnam Singh	Shiromani Akali Dal
1972	Kirpal Singh	Indian National Congress
1977	Hukam Chand	Janata Party
1980	Raghbir Singh	Shiromani Akali Dal
1985	Kirpal Singh	Indian National Congress
1992	Gulzar Singh	Indian National Congress
1997	Raghbir Singh	Shiromani Akali Dal
2002	Rana Gurjeet Singh	Indian National Congress
2004 (by-election)	Sukhjinder Kaur	Indian National Congress
2007	Rana Rajbans Kaur	Indian National Congress
2012	Rana Gurjeet Singh	Indian National Congress
2017	Rana Gurjeet Singh	Indian National Congress
2022	Rana Gurjeet Singh	Indian National Congress

2023

== Election results ==
=== 2027 ===
Punjab Assembly election, 2027: Kapurthala
Party	Candidate	Votes	%	±%
AAP				
AD (WPD)				New entry
INC				
BSP				
SAD				New entry
BJP				
NOTA	None of the above			
Majority				
Turnout				

=== 2022 ===
2022 Punjab Legislative Assembly election: Kapurthala
Party	Candidate	Votes	%	±%
INC	Rana Gurjeet Singh	44,096	42.94	▼10.81
AAP	Manju Rana	36,792	35.82	▲18.59
BSP	Devinder Singh Dhapai	8,627	8.4	New
BJP	Ranjit Singh Khojewal	6,745	6.57	New
SAD(A)	Narinder Singh	3,807	3.71	▲3.13
NOTA	None of the above	622	0.61	▼0.02
Majority		7,304	7.12	▼20.35
Turnout		102,700	68.51	▼6.18
Registered electors		149,885		
INC hold		Swing		

=== 2017 ===
Punjab Assembly election, 2017: Kapurthala
Party	Candidate	Votes	%	±%
INC	Rana Gurjeet Singh	56,378	53.75	
SAD	Paramjit Singh	27,561	26.28	
AAP	Sukhwant Singh Padda	18,076	17.23	
BSP (A)	Manoj Kumar Nahar	1,115	1.06	
NOTA	None of the above	658	0.63	
SAD(A)	Narinder Singh	605	0.58	
Majority		28,817	27.47	
Turnout		105,540	74.69	
Registered electors		141,299		
INC hold		Swing		

=== 2012 ===
Punjab Assembly election, 2012: Kapurthala
Party	Candidate	Votes	%	±%
INC	Rana Gurjeet Singh	54,221	55.30	
SAD	Sarabjit Singh Makkar	39,739	40.5	
BSP (A)	Charanjit	1,421	1.50	
Majority		14,482	14.80	
Turnout		97,913	80.7	
Registered electors		121,375		
INC hold		Swing		

== See also ==
- List of constituencies of the Punjab Legislative Assembly
- Kapurthala district
