= Sarfarosh: The Story of Shaheed Uddham Singh =

Sarfarosh: The Story of Shaheed Udham Singh
- Directed by: Brij Mohan
- Music by: Sardul Singh Kwatra
- Production company: Upkar Entertainment
- Release date: 1976
- Country: India
- Language: Punjabi

Sarfarosh: The Story of Shaheed Udham Singh is a Punjabi biographical film directed by Brij Mohan, based on the life of Indian revolutionary Udham Singh. The film was release in 1976 under the banner of Upkar Entertainment.

== Plot ==
The film revolves with the life and revolutionary activities of Udham Singh. Deeply affected by witnessing the 1919 Jallianwala Bagh massacre in Amritsar, Udham spent over two decades tracking down Michael O'Dwyer and finally assassinated him in London. Udham Singh was executed by hanging in London on 31 July 1940.

== Cast ==
- Rajan Gangahar
- Vijay Tandon
- Iqbal Sandhu
- Seema Kapoor
