= Cheema, Sangrur =

Cheema
- Town
- Location in Punjab, India Cheema (India)
- Coordinates: 30.12°N 75.695°E
- Country: India
- State: Punjab
- District: Sangrur

Population (2001)
  - Total: 9,347

Languages
  - Official: Punjabi
- Time zone: UTC+5:30 (IST)

Cheema is a town and a municipal committee in Sangrur district in the state of Punjab, India.

== Demographics ==
The table below shows the population of different religious groups in Cheema town, as of 2011 census.

Population by religious groups in Cheema town, 2011 census
Religion	Total	Female	Male
Sikh	9,149	4,305	4,844
Hindu	2,292	997	1,295
Muslim	169	70	99
Christian	3	1	2
Jain	1	0	1
Not stated	1	1	0
Total	11,615	5,374	6,241
