= Uppli =

Uppli Uppli
- town
- Interactive map of Uppli
- Country: India
- State: Punjab

Uppli is a small village in Punjab, India. It is located in the district Sangrur at 30.20860° N, 75.82154° E. It is on a link road between Sangrur and Sunam.

It is also on the rail line between Sangrur and Sunam. The nearest railway station is Bharur. By road the village is less than 3 km from Sangrur. Uppli is the site of a maize factory that used to be a government owned entity and was privatized in the 1990s. The factory foundation was laid by president Sanjeeva Reddy. The factory has been razed and replaced by urban sprawl.

Nearby villages are Ubhawal, Chathhe, and Bharur. The village has an elementary school and a high school is situated between Uppli and Chathhe.

== See also ==
Sekha
