= Suraj Kund Sunam =

Suraj Kund Mandir

Religion
- Affiliation: Hinduism
- District: Sangrur District
- Deity: Sun temple

Location
- Location: located to the east of Sunam city
- State: Punjab
- Country: India

Suraj Kund Mandir was a large Sun temple, located to the east of Sunam city (dated to the Vedic period), about 1.5 kilometres (0.93 miles) away in the tahsil and sub division of the Sangrur District in the Indian state of Punjab, was destroyed by Timur or Mohammad Ghaznavi. It is also said that Saraswati River was flowing nearby. The Suraj Kund is now in a dilapidated condition. It is situated on the Ludhiana-Hisar railway line, and is connected by road with Patiala (64 kilometres (40 miles)), Sangrur (19 kilometres (12 miles)), Bathinda (114 kilometres (71 miles)), Ludhiana (90 kilometres (56 miles)), and Chandigarh (120 kilometres (75 miles)).

== See also ==
- Surajkund
