= Longowal =

Longowal LONGOWAL
- Town
- Location in Punjab, India Longowal (India)
- Coordinates: 30.2167°N 75.6833°E
- Country: India
- State: Punjab
- District: Sangrur
- Founder: Baba Alla Singh

Government
  - Type: Municipality / A BIG OLD Village
  - Body: Longowal Municipality<Longowal

Area
  - Total: 54 km^{2} (21 sq mi)
  - Rank: 34th

Population (2011)
  - Total: 42,346
  - Rank: 19th
  - Density: 780/km^{2} (2,000/sq mi)

Languages
  - Official: Punjabi
- Time zone: UTC+5:30 (IST)
- PIN: 148106

Longowal is a town with municipal council in Sangrur district in the Indian state of Punjab.

== Overview ==
Longowal village was first brought into existence by Baba Alla ji Singh, in whose name a very old Gurudwara is still running in its original place, now almost at the centre of the village.

This village has been the 3rd largest village within Punjab for half a century and has been run by a municipality since the 1950s. There used to be a Granthi named Harchand Singh from a neighbouring village who used to organise Kirtans in the area. He became very popular by the name Sant Harchand Singh Longowal because he moved to Longowal in early 1940s and became president ("Pardhan") of most of the Gurudwars of Longowal. He associated with another well known and outgoing Hindu business man Lala Bantram of "Balle ka lana - family" being the old inhabitants of this village, and these two had a keen interest in the development of Longowal village in 1950s. They liaised with the government to have the village connected by road, get the first health centre established at Gurudwara Shaheed Bhai Mani Singh (the only Gurudware out of 7 in the town which is pure white), get a high school sanctioned and a new community school building established with efforts from all villagers. Postal services were also improved.

Following all the improvements mentioned above, the village came into prominence and so did Sant Harchand Singh Longowal who then became actively involved in the politics of Punjab. Village Longowal earned repute at the national level when the central government set up the Sant Longowal Institute of Engineering and Technology.

== Demographics ==
As of 2001 India census, Longowal had a population of 20,269. Males constitute 55% of the population and females 45%. Longowal has an average literacy rate of 52%, lower than the national average of 59.5%: male literacy is 56%, and female literacy is 46%. In Longowal, 13% of the population is under 6 years of age.

Population of longowal is increasing and sewerage system is being laid.
