= G. K. Singh =

Indian civil servant

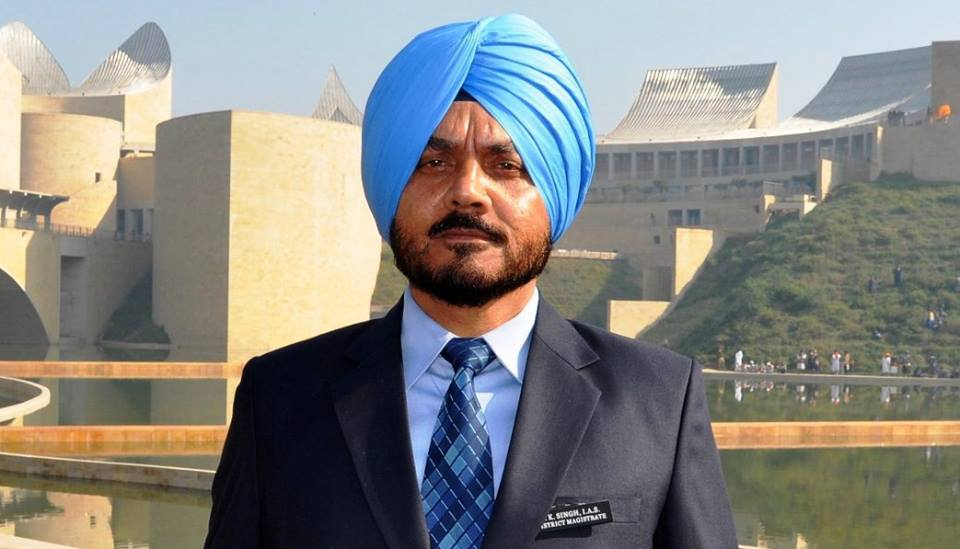
- G.K.Singh, at the inauguration of Virasat-e-Khalsa Sri Anandpur Sahib, 25 November 2011

Director, Rural Development & Panchayats, Punjab
- Incumbent
- Assumed office 4 August 2016
- Preceded by: Sukhjit Singh Bains

Director General School Education, Punjab
- In office 29 June 2014 – 26 December 2014
- Preceded by: Anjali Bhawra
- Succeeded by: Pradeep Aggarwal

Deputy Commissioner, Patiala
- In office 20 April 2012 – 23 May 2014
- Preceded by: Vikas Garg
- Succeeded by: Varun Roojam

Deputy Commissioner, Ropar
- In office 3 April 2011 – 19 April 2012
- Preceded by: Arunjit Singh Miglani
- Succeeded by: Pradeep Aggarwal

Personal details
- Born: Gopal Krishan Singh Dhaliwal; 17 June 1957 (age 69) Jalwana, Sangrur, Punjab
- Spouse: Neel Kamal Kaur Brar Dhaliwal (1988– )
- Children: Rohan Bir, Kanwar Partap Bir
- Education: Punjabi University, Patiala
- Profession: Indian Administrative Services

Gopal Krishan Singh Dhaliwal (born 17 June 1957) is an Indian civil servant who currently serves as Director of the Department of Rural Development and Panchayats for the state of Punjab, India. He is a 1986 batch officer of the Punjab Civil Services, and Indian Administrative Service in the year 2000.

He is the founder of an NGO, Village Development Council, Jalwana, involved in the integrated development of backward areas of Punjab. He is also one of the founders of Sarbat Da Bhala Charitable Trust, instrumental in rehabilitation of disabled and bringing back Punjabi youth languishing in jails abroad.

== Early life and education ==
Singh was born to Sukhdev Singh Dhaliwal and Mata Gurdial Kaur in village Jalwana, Sangrur District. He received his primary education in Government Primary School, village Lohatbaddi. He completed his higher studies at Government Rajindra College, Bathinda and later did political science (honors) from Punjabi University, Patiala. He earned the gold medal at the age of 20 years.

== Personal life ==
He married Neel Kamal Brar in 1988 in Bathinda. He has two sons Rohan Bir and Kanwar Partap.

== Teaching career ==
After completing his master’s degree in 1978 at the age of 21, Singh was appointed as a lecturer in the field of International Politics by the Government of Punjab. After quitting his job as an officer in the Punjab Civil Services in 1986, he taught students in Government College, Sri Mukatsar Sahib, Patran (Patiala) and Malerkotla. He has given lectures on topics concerning various social issues in colleges.

=== Punjab Civil Services and Indian Administrative Services ===
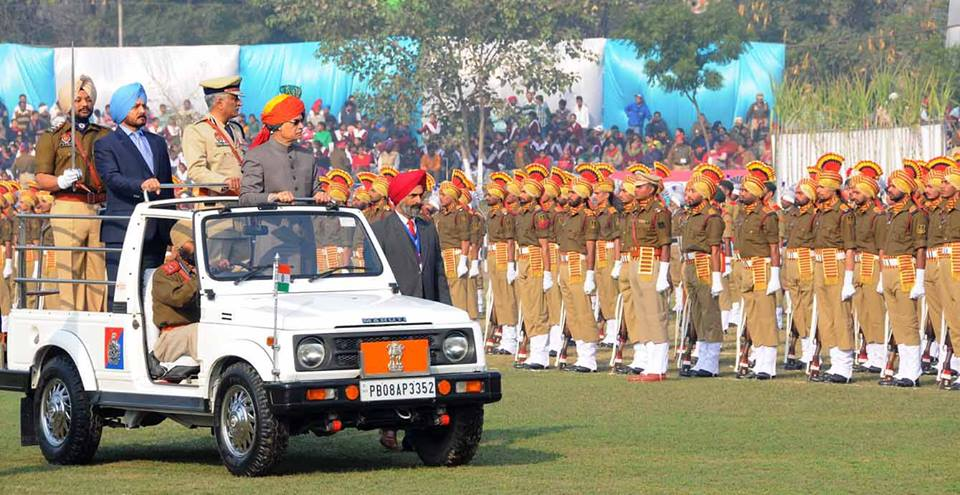
G.K.Singh accompanying His Excellency Sh.Shivraj Patil, Governor of Punjab, inspecting Guard of Honor at Yadavindra Public School Stadium, Patiala

Singh was an officer in the Punjab Civil Services. Also served as Executive Magistrate, Bathinda and, GA to DC, Faridkot. He was posted as district transport officer, Bathinda from 1991 to 1993 and regional transport authority from 1994 to 1996. During the latter stint, he was instrumental in organizing the annual Road Safety Awareness Week. He joined as the Additional Deputy Commissioner (Development) in April 1996. He also served Departments of school education as Joint Secretary. He was appointed Additional Deputy Commissioner, Sangrur for a period of three years from 1999 till 2001. Singh also held the post of District Census Officer for 2001 Census Operations. He was awarded the President of India's silver medal for the same.

Singh was promoted to the Indian Administrative Services with the batch of 2001. He was posted as Director, Colonization, Punjab. He joined as the Deputy Commissioner, District of Rupnagar on 5 April 2011. During his tenure there he was instrumental in improving sanitation and greenery in the city as well as district. He was instrumental in stopping illegal sand mining in the area and also played in conducting free and fair elections for state assembly in 2012. He later served as Deputy Commissioner of District of Patiala in 2012. After a two-year stint in Patiala, Singh was posted as Director General School Education, Punjab looking after the primary, middle and high school education in the state. As DGSE, Punjab he laid emphasis on student safety and took steps to prevent child abuse. He also banned phubbing by teachers during school hours. Singh initiated setting up of helpline to redress the public grievances related to the Department of School Education. and was instrumental in setting up the anti-Drug Awareness Campaign in school across the state. Singh started the "Sohna School Campaign" and was instrumental in setting up toilets for students in all government schools as a part of the same. On 25 December 2014 he was given the charge of Commissioner, Municipal Corporation, Ludhiana. He laid emphasis on promoting Swachh Bharat Abhiyaan improving the green belt and people's participation on joining his new assignment. During his tenure, Ludhiana was chosen as one of the 20 cities and the only city from Punjab for the implementation of Smart City Project by the Ministry of Urban Development, Housing and Urban Poverty Alleviation, Government of India. As the Commissioner of Municipal Corporation in Ludhiana, he was instrumental in establishing the public library at Guru Nanak Bhawan, upgrading the two landmark greenbelts, Rakh Bagh and Rose Garden. He reopened the children's library in Ludhiana after a period of 16 years. During his tenure in Ludhiana, the city moved to rank 34 from rank 381 in the Swachh Bharat Abhiyaan rankings. He was deputed as Director, Rural Development and Panchayats, for the state of Punjab in August 2016. He initiated scoring and honouring system for best Panchayats in the state on every Independence Day.

== Awards and honors ==
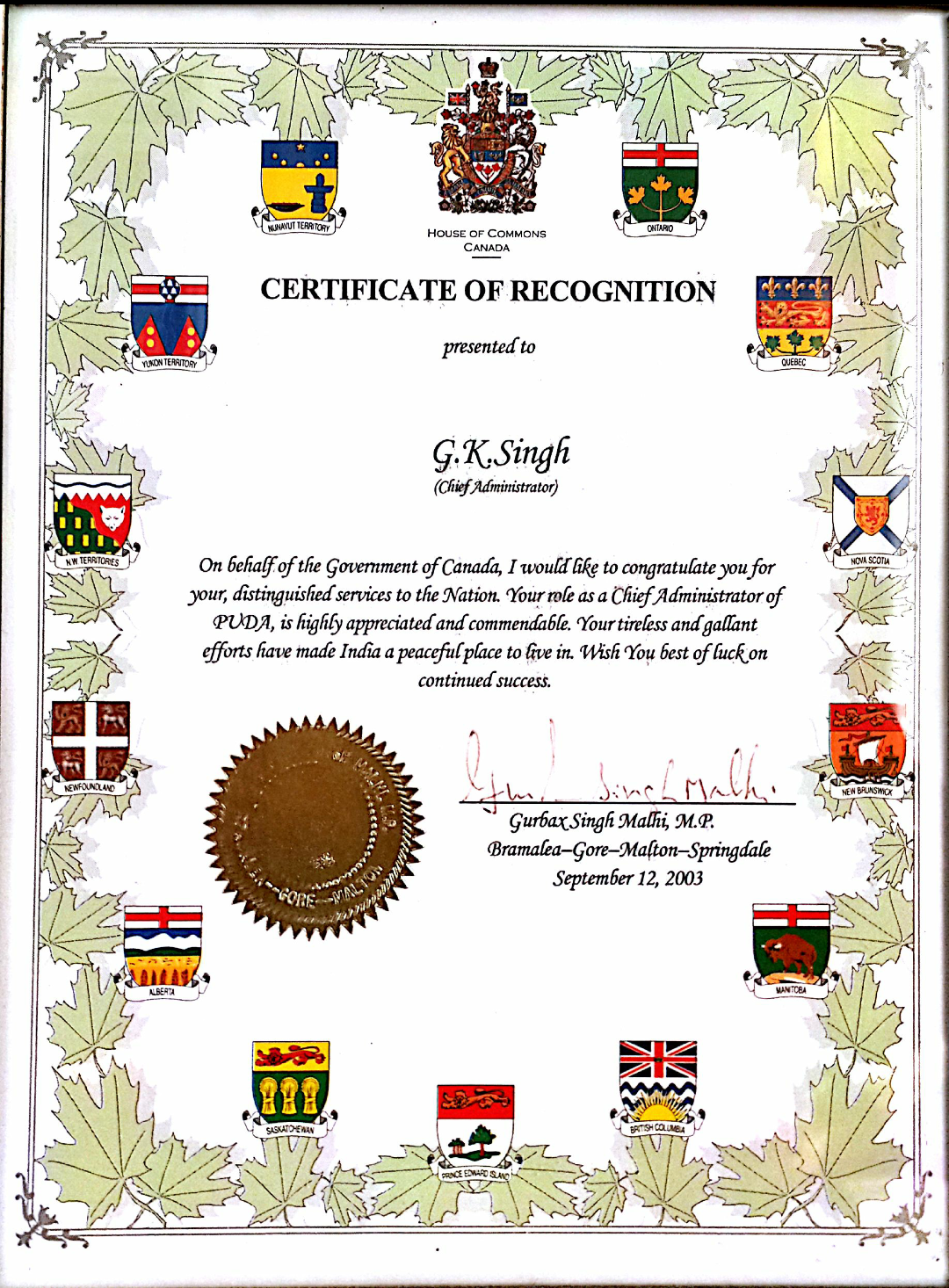
Certificate of Recognition presented to G.K.Singh by Hon.Gurbax Singh Malhi on behalf of the House of Commons of Canada

1. President of India Silver Medal for Census Operations, 2001
2. Commendation Certificate by the House of Commons, Canada by MP Hon. Gurbax Singh Malhi
3. Certificate of Honor by Ms.Susan Fenell Mayor of Brampton, Canada.
4. Certificate of Honor by the Legislative Assembly of Alberta by MPP Mr.Darshan Kang
5. Certificate of Honor by the Legislative Assembly of British Columbia

== Village Development Council ==
The residents of village Jalwana under his leadership, along with the support of diaspora, founded the Village Development Council on 13 April 1999. In the very first gathering of the village, a target was set to make it a model village by achieving the following 8 targets:

1. Construction of the village periphery road having a length of 1.25 km.
2. Redesigning the water drains and connecting them to Tallewal drain
3. Construction of a modern Old Age Home for village elders
4. Developing the village cremation ground.
5. Street lighting of all village streets and periphery roads and ensuring 24 hour electricity supply
6. Building up of peaceful mutual brotherhood conducive to development of entire village
7. Providing a strong financial support to brilliant students for higher studies.
8. Steps towards mutual co-operation for removal of unemployment.

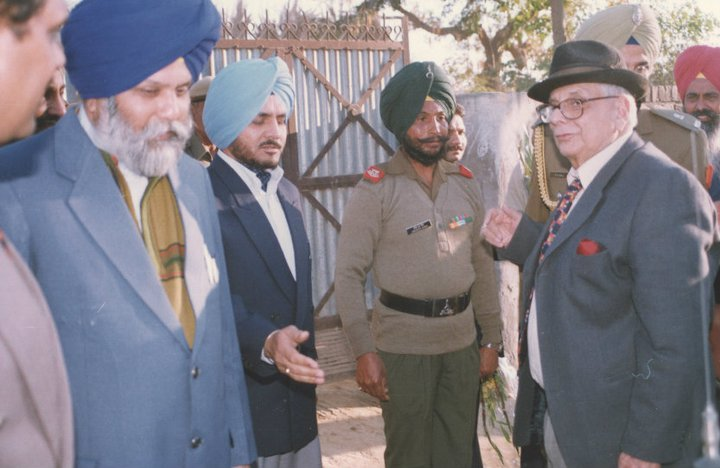
Erstwhile Governor of Punjab General J. F. R. Jacob (Retd.) during his visit to Village Jalwana, declaring it the "Millenium Model Village"

Within a year the council was successful in achieving 6 of the above-given targets.

This village was the first in the district to have streetlights in all areas. Halogen lamps and electric tubes were installed along the periphery and streets. Residents have associated the lighting with efforts to address illiteracy and social issues. Few criminal cases have been reported from the village in the last 15 years.

The Governor of Punjab His Excellency Gen. J. F. R. Jacob declared it a "Millennium Village" on his maiden visit to the place.

== Columnist ==
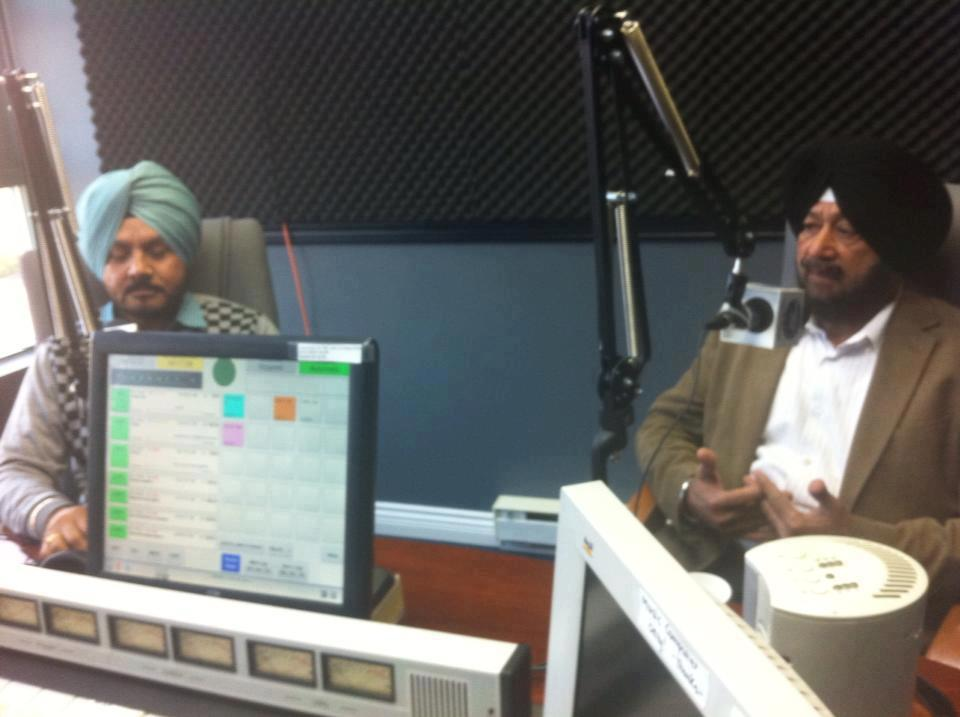
G.K.Singh along with philanthropist S.P.Singh Oberoi during a radio talk show hosted by RED FM, Surrey B.C.

Singh has also worked as regular columnist for leading Punjabi newspapers in India and Canada namely Gurmat Parkash, Punjabi Tribune, Daily Ajit, Indo Canadian Times, Desh Sewak, Desh Videsh Times on various social issues plaguing Punjab. He has presented talks on All India Radio, Jalandhar, Red FM, Surrey B.C. As the Deputy Commissioner, Patiala and the ex-officio chairman of the District Child Welfare Council, he launched the magazine, "Balpreet", consisting of contributions by the school children and is circulated in all government and private schools. He is also the advisor and founder member of "Saade Pind" magazine published by the Department of Rural Development and Panchayats, Govt. of Punjab, consisting of articles to enlighten farmers about the latest farming practices and overall rural development. His articles and literature about Sikhism has been cited multiple times by the Head Granthi of Sri Harimandir Sahib during the katha of the Daily Hukamnama from Manji Sahib.
