= Navtej Singh Cheema =

Indian politician

MLA, Punjab
- In office 2012 - 2022
- Preceded by: Upinderjit Kaur
- Succeeded by: Rana Inder Pratap Singh
- Constituency: Sultanpur Lodhi

Personal details
- Party: Indian National Congress

Navtej Singh Cheema is an Indian politician and belongs to Indian National Congress. He was member of Punjab Legislative Assembly and represented Sultanpur Lodhi.

== Family ==
His father's name is Gurmail Singh Cheema (Former Minister of Punjab), His wife's name is Jaspal Kaur Cheema, he has two sons named, Jaskaran Singh Cheema and Gurnihal Singh Cheema .

== Political career ==
Cheema was elected to Punjab Legislative Assembly from Sultanpur Lodhi in 2012 by beating Punjab Education Minister Upinderjit Kaur. Earlier in 2007, he had contested elections from Sultanpur Lodhi but lost to Upinderjit Kaur.

On 9 October 2015, Cheema along with party supporters blocked the Sultanpur Lodhi-Kapurthala road in protest at the filing of charges against Municipal Council president Vinod Kumar Gupta outside the Tehsil complex at Sultanpur Lodhi.
