= Rana Inder Pratap Singh =

Indian politician

Rana Inder Partap Singh

Member of the Punjab Legislative Assembly
- Incumbent
- Assumed office 2022
- Preceded by: Navtej Singh Cheema
- Constituency: Sultanpur Lodhi

Personal details
- Born: 9 February 1980 (age 46)
- Party: Independent
- Parent: Rana Gurjeet Singh (father) Harbans Kaur Rana (Mother)

Rana Inder Pratap Singh is an Indian politician, corporate executive, and sports marksman from Punjab. He was elected to the 16th Punjab Assembly in the 2022 Punjab Legislative Assembly election and represents the Sultanpur Lodhi constituency.

== Personal life ==
Rana Inder Pratap Singh was born on 9 February 1980 and is the son of senior Punjab politician and former cabinet minister Rana Gurjeet Singh. He holds a BBA from Chapman University in California and an MBA from the University of Kent in the United Kingdom. He is an shooter who has represented India in international shooting championships.

== Business Career ==
During the 2022 Punjab Legislative Assembly election, he declared Rs. 69,75,52,000 as an overall financial asset and Rs. 17,97,03,000 as financial liability. He served as the Managing Director of Rana Sugars Limited, a major North Indian business enterprise, before stepping down in April 2024. He remains active as a director across several business infrastructure companies under the Rana Group umbrella.

== Political Career ==
He contested and won the 2022 Punjab Legislative Assembly election, as an independent candidate after being denied a Congress party ticket.
