= Sadhu Singh Thind =

Indian scholar and politician

S. Sadhu Singh Thind is an Indian scholar and politician, most notable for serving the longest term as President of the District Congress Committee, Kapurthala, Punjab. He also served as an MLA from Sultanpur Lodhi. While serving as MLA, he was noted for repatriating the remains of Udham Singh from England to India in 1974.
