= Nilowal =

- Village
- Location in Punjab, India Nilowal (India)
- Coordinates: 31.0391323°N 76.1472327°E
- Country: India
- State: Punjab
- District: Shaheed Bhagat Singh Nagar

Government
  - Type: Panchayat raj
  - Body: Gram panchayat

Population (2011)
  - Total: 610
- Sex ratio 318/292 ♂/♀

Languages
  - Official: Punjabi
- Time zone: UTC+5:30 (IST)
- PIN: 144517
- ISO 3166 code: IN-PB
- Post office: Bahloor Kalan (B.O)
- Website: nawanshahr.nic.in

Nilowal is a village in Shaheed Bhagat Singh Nagar district of Punjab State, India. It is located 3.6 kilometres (2.2 mi) away from branch post office Bahloor Kalan, 13 kilometres (8.1 mi) from Nawanshahr, 15 kilometres (9.3 mi) from district headquarter Shaheed Bhagat Singh Nagar and 91 kilometres (57 mi) from state capital Chandigarh. The village is administrated by Sarpanch an elected representative of the village.

== Demography ==
As of 2011, Nilowal has a total number of 120 houses and population of 610 of which 318 include are males while 292 are females according to the report published by Census India in 2011. The literacy rate of Nilowal is 81.42% higher than the state average of 75.84%. The population of children under the age of 6 years is 61 which is 10% of total population of Nilowal, and child sex ratio is approximately 1033 as compared to Punjab state average of 846.

Most of the people are from Schedule Caste which constitutes 82.62% of total population in Nilowal. The town does not have any Schedule Tribe population so far.

As per the report published by Census India in 2011, 257 people were engaged in work activities out of the total population of Nilowal which includes 224 males and 33 females. According to census survey report 2011, 84.05% workers describe their work as main work and 15.95% workers are involved in Marginal activity providing livelihood for less than 6 months.

== Education ==
The village has a Punjabi medium, co-ed primary school established in 1952. The school provide mid-day meal as per Indian Midday Meal Scheme. As per Right of Children to Free and Compulsory Education Act the school provide free education to children between the ages of 6 and 14.

KC Engineering College and Doaba Khalsa Trust Group Of Institutions are the nearest colleges. Industrial Training Institute for women (ITI Nawanshahr) is 13 kilometres (8.1 mi). The village is 64 kilometres (40 mi) away from Chandigarh University, 49.7 kilometres (30.9 mi) from Indian Institute of Technology and 57 kilometres (35 mi) away from Lovely Professional University.

== Transport ==
Nawanshahr train station is the nearest train station however, Garhshankar Junction railway station is 24.8 kilometres (15.4 mi) away from the village. Sahnewal Airport is the nearest domestic airport which located 47.8 kilometres (29.7 mi) away in Ludhiana and the nearest international airport is located in Chandigarh also Sri Guru Ram Dass Jee International Airport is the second nearest airport which is 166 kilometres (103 mi) away in Amritsar.

== See also ==
- List of villages in India
