= Sant Longowal Institute of Engineering and Technology =

University in India

Coordinates: 30°12′56″N 75°41′49″E

- "Modern Gurukul" of Tech Education
- Motto: योग: कर्मसु कौशलम् (Sanskrit)
- Motto in English: Excellence in action is yoga
- Type: Public engineering school
- Established: 1989; 37 years ago
- Affiliations: UGC, NAAC, NBA
- Chairman: Dr. K. Radhakrishnan
- Director: Dr. Manikant Paswan
- Academic staff: c. 300
- Students: c. 3400
- Location: SLIET Road, Longowal, Sangrur, Punjab, India
- Campus: Suburban, 451 acres (183 ha)
- Website: sliet.ac.in

Sant Longowal Institute of Engineering and Technology (abbreviated SLIET ) is a Govt. of India established (1989) deemed university under Section 3 of the UGC Act 1956 for higher education and research in India. The UG Program of SLIET is accredited as TIER 1 by the NBA ( National Board of Accreditation). It is well known as the "Modern Gurukul" of Tech Education due to lush green campus of 451 acres (183 ha) in Longowal, Sangrur, Punjab, India. SLIET is fully funded by the Ministry of Human Resource Development, and is an autonomous body controlled by the SLIET Society. Institute has been set up in the memory of Late Sh. Harchand Singh ji Longowal under Rajiv Longowal Punjab accord. Educational opportunities include technical and practical training in the fields of engineering and technology. The students and alumni of SLIET are informally referred to as SLIETians.

== History ==
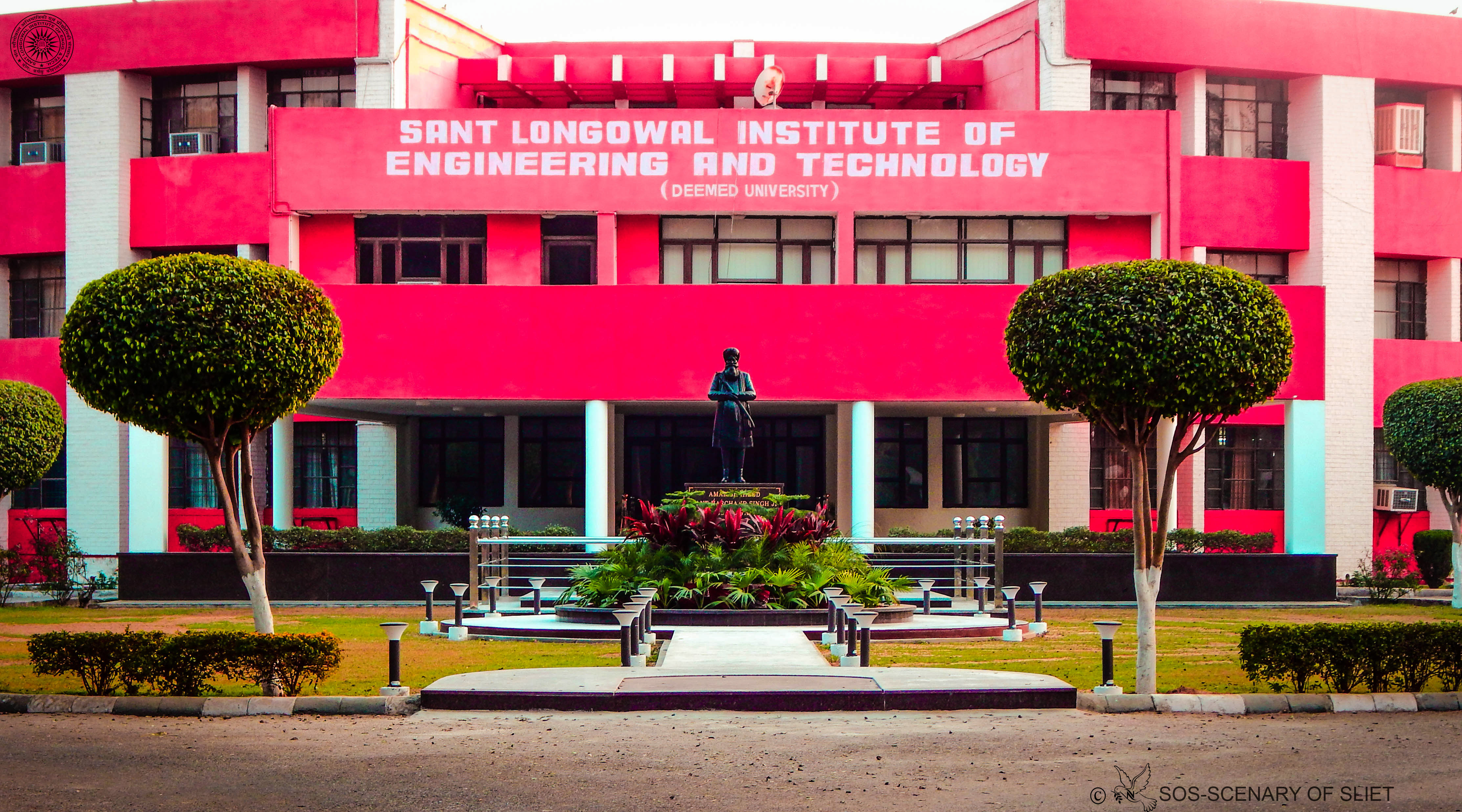
Main Building of SLIET Longowal.

Established by the Ministry of Human Resource Development (MHRD) in 1989 and formally inaugurated by Sh. Arjun Singh, Minister of HRD, Gov. Of India, on 20 December 1991, SLIET was established to provide education in areas of engineering and technology. It was named in memory of Harchand Singh Longowal, a Sikh political party leader who was assassinated in 1985 after signing a peace accord with the government of Punjab. At the time of Longowal's assassination, Prime Minister Rajiv Gandhi called it "a tragedy not just for Punjab but for the whole country. He worked courageously . . . to remove hatred from the hearts of men and to bring peace after so much strife and pain."

The institute initiated certificate and diploma programmes in 1991, and the degree programme in 1993. Post graduate courses in four disciplines were initiated in 2003. All degree programmes were accredited in 2003 by the All India Council for Technical Education, and an impact assessment and review were conducted by Educational Consultants India in 2004. The institute was previously affiliated to Punjab Technical University. However, it was later accorded the status of Deemed to be University during the year 2007–08.

SLIET got "DELL College of the Year 2019 Award" By Dell Technologies, Banglore.

== Administration ==
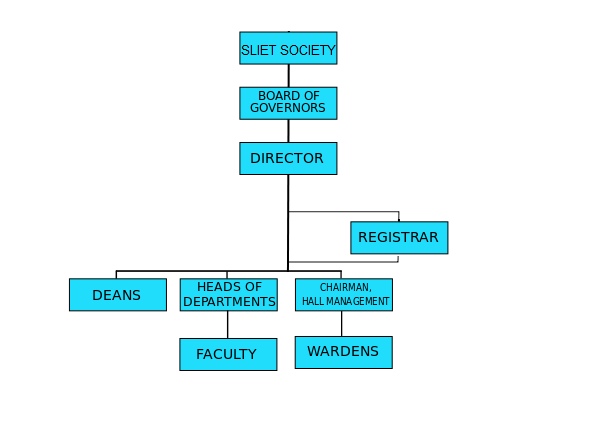
Organisational structure of SLIET

The Board of Governors of SLIET is under the SLIET Society, and headed by Sh. Jagdish Rai Singal Managing Director of Eastman Industries Ltd., Eastman Cast & Forge Ltd. and Director of Eastman Auto & Power Ltd. and Ministry of Human Resource Development officials. The Administration Section of SLIET, Longowal is having Dy. Registrar, Dr. Sanjay Gupta, who also looks after the library and function under the overall managerial control of the Registrar and Director.

SLIET receives its funding from the government, student fees and research funding by industry-sponsored projects.

The academic policies of SLIET are decided by its senate. It consists of all professors of the institute, administrators and students. Registrar is the member secretary of Senate.

There are four deans, who look after different functions who are appointed by Director for a period of two years, with registrar as the central officer, who is appointed by Board of Management and is also member secretary of building works committee, head of examinations, planning and monitoring board and only authorised official to make outside correspondence on behalf of Institute.

== Admissions ==
The admissions to the B.Tech programs run by the institute is based on Joint Entrance Examination Main (JEE Main) conducted across India. Admissions to the MTech programs are by the GATE exam conducted by the IITs and IISc. The M.Sc.programs are offered through JAM exam conducted by IITsThe postgraduate admission is on the basis of research and interviews by the appropriate screening committees.

For foreign students, admissions are done through Direct Admission of Students Abroad (DASA) scheme.

== Campus ==
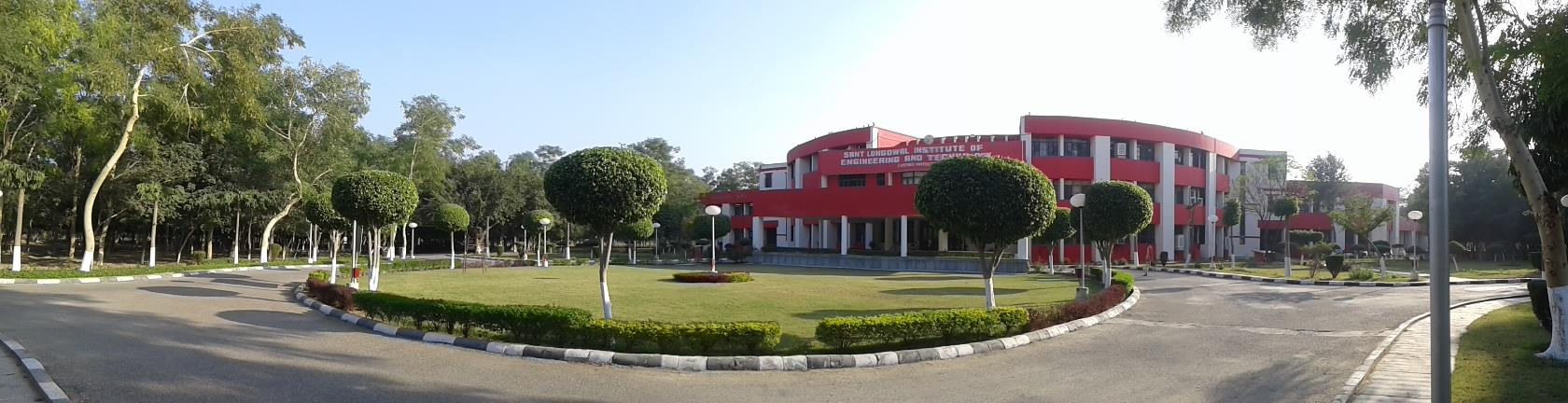
Panorama View of SLIET's Main Building

SLIET is located 19 kilometres (12 mi) east of Sangrur. It is situated on 451 acres (183 ha) of land provided by the Punjab government. The property is landscaped and well maintained to provide for an aesthetically pleasing environment.

=== Academic units ===
Departments :

- Chemical Engineering
- Chemistry
- Civil Engineering
- Computer Science & Engineering
- Disabilities studies
- Electrical Engineering
- Electronics & Communication Engineering
- Food Engineering & Technology
- Mathematics
- Mechanical Engineering
- Management and Humanities
- Physics
- Instrumentation and control engineering

=== Library ===
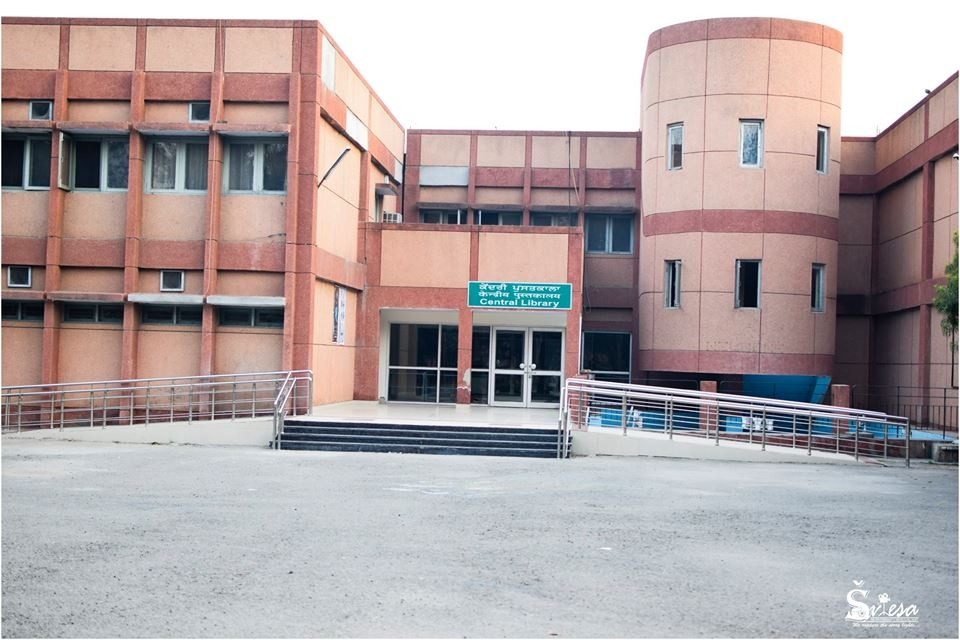
Central Library of SLIET

=== Health Center ===
The Health Center has been established in the institute premises, in a covered area of approx. 400 m^{2}, with a capacity of four beds. It provides day to day medical facilities at primary level to the students, staff and faculty. For general awareness, the Health Center organizes various seminars/camps with the help of District Health Department.

=== Clubs and student forums ===
SLIET has various clubs like SSDC (SLIET Software Development Club), HSSC, SVIESA, InternWell, Happy club, Team Mavericks, Endeavour, Hacktakers, IIChE SLIET-Student Chapter, Standard Club etc. which span a range of interests among students. The clubs come under the purview of the Dean (Student-Faculty Welfare). Each club is represented by the faculty advisor and student coordinator who coordinates the activities of their respective club.

=== Hostels ===
There are 14 hostels (10 boys and 4 girls). The hostels are named after Indian scientists.

== Ranking ==
University rankings

Engineering – India
- NIRF (2024): 76

Sant Longowal Institute of Engineering and Technology was ranked 76 among Engineering Colleges in India and ranked 85 among all Universities in India by the National Institutional Ranking Framework (NIRF) in 2024 and it was 56 in 2016.

== Festivals ==
The major annual festival organised by SLIETians every year are :

- TechFest : a tech festival of the college to showcase the technical skill of the students.TechFest'19
- Madhuram : a cultural festival.
- SocialFest : a social festival of college to motivate students towards social responsibilities.SocialFest'19

== SPIC MACAY SLIET Chapter ==
SPICMACAY (Society for the Promotion of Indian Classical Music and Culture Amongst Youth) is a non-political nationwide voluntary movement that organizes programs of classical music and dance, folk arts, crafts, yoga, classic cinema screenings and much more inside the schools and colleges throughout the world to make students more aware about the Indian and world heritage. It was founded by a renowned professor of IIT Delhi, Dr. Kiran Seth in 1977.

SPICMACAY in SLIET, Longowal is an official club which provides a platform for talented performers. The club provides a platform to showcase talent and an opportunity to grow and learn from other fellow performers and enhance their pre- acquired skills. It also organizes various workshops where artists are invited to learn more and improve.

== See also ==
- National Institute of Technology, Jalandhar
- Indian Institute of Technology, Ropar
