= Manjit Bawa =

Indian painter (1941–2008)

- Born: 1941; Dhuri, Punjab, India
- Died: 29 December 2008 (aged 66–67); Delhi
- Known for: painting

Manjit Bawa (1941 – 29 December 2008), born in Dhuri, Punjab, India, was an Indian painter.

== Biography ==
Bawa was born in 1941 in Dhuri, British India. His elder brothers encouraged him to pursue art. He studied fine arts at the College of Art, New Delhi between 1958 and 1963, where his professors included Somnath Hore, Rakesh Mehra, Dhanaraj Bhagat and B.C. Sanyal. "But I gained an identity under Abani Sen. Sen would ask me to do 50 sketches every day, only to reject most of them. As a result, I inculcated the habit of working continuously. He taught me to revere the figurative at a time when the entire scene was leaning in favor of the abstract. Without that initial training I could never have been able to distort forms and create the stylization you see in my work today," recalls Bawa.

== Works ==
Between 1964 and 1971, Bawa worked as a silkscreen printer in Britain, where he also studied art. "On my return, I faced a crisis. I asked myself, 'What shall I paint?' I couldn't be just another derivative of a European style of painting." Instead, he found Indian mythology and Sufi (school of Islam) poetry. "I had been brought up on stories from the Mahabharat, the Ramayan, and the Puranas (Hindu mythological and sociological texts), on the poetry of Waris Shah (a Punjabi poet) and readings from the Guru Granth Sahib (holy book of the Sikhs)," he says.

Manjit Bawa's canvases are distinguishable in their colors - the ochre of sunflowers, the green of the paddy fields, the red of the sun, the blue of the mountain sky. He was one of the first painters to break out of the dominant grays and browns and opted for more traditionally Indian colors like pinks, reds and violet.

He had painted Ranjha, the cowherd from the tragic ballad Heer Ranjha and Lord Krishna with a flute surrounded by dogs and not cows as in mythological paintings. Indian gods Kali and Shiva, whom Bawa considers as "icons of my country", also figure prominently in his paintings.

Nature also plays inspiration here. When young, he would travel widely either on foot, by bicycle or simply, by hitchhiking. "I have been almost everywhere - Himachal Pradesh, Rajasthan, Gujarat. I would spread a sheet of paper on the ground and draw the countryside. The colors and the simplicity of people I met fascinated me." Birds and animals make a constant appearance in his paintings, either alone or in human company. Besides nature, the flute is a recurring motif in his works. Bawa learnt to play the flute from maestro Pannalal Ghosh. He has painted Ranjha, the cowherd from the tragic love ballad Heer Ranjha, playing the flute. He has painted Krishna with a flute, surrounded by dogs and not by cows as mythological paintings depict him. Besides these, figures of Kali and Shiva dominate Bawa's canvases; "they are the icons of my country," he feels.

If Bawa is known for his vibrant paintings, he is also known for his love of spirituality, and particularly of Sufi philosophy. "I find a wealth of wisdom in the scriptures. Sufi philosophy has taught me that man and man, man and animals, can co-exist," he says.

The painter has been surrounded by controversies in his life as an artist, the most recent one being accused of forgery by his assistant.

For Bawa, drawing is his first love. "I enjoy doing it, for it isn't decorative and loud. One can use minimum essentials to extract the maximum effect," says the artist. "I was inspired to return to drawing after seeing Michelangelo's sketches and drawings at an exhibition in Amsterdam, where I had gone for one of my shows. The idea stuck in my mind. I don't work on demand, but follow my heart and mind, for I feel everything has a time and a place."

== Personal life ==
Manjit Bawa lived in Delhi. His wife's name was Sharda Bawa. Manjit Bawa's son's name is Ravi Bawa and his daughter's name is Bhavana Bawa. He died on 29 December 2008, aged 67. He was in a coma for three years after suffering a stroke.

== Awards and honours ==
- 2002 'Meeting Manjit', film on Manjit Bawa directed by Buddhadeb Dasgupta, received the National Award for Best Documentary
- 1986 1st Bharat Bhawan Biennale, Bhopal
- 1981 All India Exhibition of Prints and Drawings, Chandigarh
- 1980 National Award, Lalit Kala Akademi, New Delhi
- 1963 Sailoz Prize, New Delhi
