= Upinderjit Kaur =

Indian politician

MLA, Punjab
- In office 1997-2012
- Preceded by: Gurmail Singh (politician)
- Succeeded by: Navtej Singh Cheema
- Constituency: Sultanpur

Minister for Technical Education and Industrial Training
- In office 1997-2002
- Succeeded by: Rajinder Kaur Bhattal

Minister for School Education
- In office 2007-2010
- Preceded by: Harnam Das Johar
- Succeeded by: Sewa Singh Sekhwan

Minister for Finance & Planning
- In office October 2010-March 2012
- Preceded by: Manpreet Singh Badal
- Succeeded by: Parminder Singh Dhindsa

Personal details
- Party: Shiromani Akali Dal

Upinderjit Kaur is an Indian politician and belongs to the ruling Shiromani Akali Dal.

== Early life and education ==
Her father S.Atma Singh was a minister of Punjab and Akali Dal leader. Her mother's name is Bibi Tej Kaur. She did M.A. in economics from Delhi University and M.A. in Punjabi from Panjab University, Chandigarh. She got Ph.D in Economics from Punjabi University, Patiala.

== Career ==
=== Academic career ===
She has taught Economics at Punjabi University and was a Professor of Economics. She also served as the Principal of Guru Nanak Khalsa College, Sultanpur Lodhi, and Dist. Kapurthala. She has written two books 'Development of Theory of Demand' and 'Sikh Religion and Economic Development'. Her second book is about the role of non-economic factors, especially religion in economic development. She was awarded Dr. Ganda Singh Memorial Award for her original research paper 'The Place and Status of Women in Sikh Society'.

=== Political career ===
She was elected to the Punjab Legislative Assembly in 1997 on an Akali Dal ticket from Sultanpur for first time. She was made a cabinet minister in the Prakash Singh Badal government and given the portfolio of Technical Education and Industrial Training, Cultural Affairs and Tourism, Housing and Urban Development. She was re-elected from Sultanpur in 2002 and 2007. She was again made cabinet minister in 2007 and was minister of Education, Civil Aviation, Vigilance and Justice. In October 2010, she was made minister of finance after the removal of Manpreet Singh Badal. She is the first woman finance minister in the independent India. She has remained member of various Vidhan Sabha Committees, such as Public Accounts Committee, Estimates Committee, Public Undertakings Committee, House Committee. In 2012 Punjab elections she was the oldest candidate among woman at the age of 72.
