= Rana Gurjeet Singh =

Indian politician

Member of the Punjab Legislative Assembly for Kapurthala
- Incumbent
- Assumed office March 2012
- Preceded by: Rana Rajbans Kaur
- In office March 2002 – March 2004
- Preceded by: Raghbir Singh
- Succeeded by: Sukhjinder Kaur

Member of the Lok Sabha for Jalandhar
- In office May 2004 – May 2009
- Preceded by: Balbir Singh
- Succeeded by: Mohinder Singh Kaypee

Personal details
- Born: 19 April 1952 (age 73) Udham Singh Nagar, Uttarakhand
- Party: Indian National Congress
- Spouse: Rana Rajbans Kaur
- Children: 2, including Rana Inder Pratap
- As of 17 May 2009

Rana Gurjeet Singh (born 19 April 1952) is an Indian politician. He is a member of Indian National Congress.

== Political career ==
Singh is currently serving as a Member of Legislative Assembly from Kapurthala Assembly constituency in Punjab. He represented the Jalandhar Lok Sabha constituency of Punjab from 2004 to 2009. He has also served as a cabinet minister in Punjab Government.

== About Himself ==
Rana Gurjeet Singh is a self-made man who began his journey in farming before finding success in the seed business. With determination and hard work, he went on to become a prominent industrialist. Known as a man of his words, he has earned the admiration of people not just in Punjab but across regions. His positive approach to challenges sets him apart—he focuses on solutions rather than dwelling on criticism or problems. Rana Gurjeet Singh is a dedicated Congressman by birth. His father played a pivotal role in supporting Narayan Datt Tiwari in becoming the Chief Minister of Uttar Pradesh.

On 25 December 2016, a criminal complaint against Singh was filed for an alleged assault against Kulwinder Singh Babbal, Bholath Assembly constituency in the Punjab Legislative Assembly election. However, Ranjit Singh Rana went to become INC candidate from Bholath. Later, Rana Gurjeet Singh claimed on 29 December that the complaint was filed on behalf of a Shiromani Akali Dal leader.

== Assets and liabilities declared during elections ==
During the 2022 Punjab Legislative Assembly election, he declared Rs. 1,25,64,36,000 as an overall financial asset and Rs. 71,75,02,000 as financial liability.

== MLA ==
The Aam Aadmi Party gained a strong 79% majority in the sixteenth Punjab Legislative Assembly by winning 92 out of 117 seats in the 2022 Punjab Legislative Assembly election. MP Bhagwant Mann was sworn in as Chief Minister on 16 March 2022.

== Electoral performance ==
2022 Punjab Legislative Assembly election: Kapurthala
Party	Candidate	Votes	%	±%
INC	Rana Gurjeet Singh	44,096	42.94	▼10.81
AAP	Manju Rana	36,792	35.82	▲18.59
BSP	Devinder Singh Dhapai	8,627	8.4	New
BJP	Ranjit Singh Khojewal	6,745	6.57	New
SAD(A)	Narinder Singh	3,807	3.71	▲3.13
NOTA	None of the above	622	0.61	▼0.02
Majority		7,304	7.12	▼20.35
Turnout		1,02,700	68.51	▼6.18
Registered electors		149,885		
INC hold		Swing		
