= Dhuri =

- Town
- Location in Punjab, India Dhuri (India)
- Country: India
- State: Punjab
- District: Sangrur
- Elevation: 236 m (774 ft)

Population (2011)
  - Urban: 55,225
  - Rural: 3,529

Language
  - Official: Punjabi
- Time zone: UTC+5:30 (IST)
- PIN: 148024
- Telephone code: 01675
- Vehicle registration: PB 59
- Sex ratio: 54% M, 46% F ♂/♀
- Website: www.dhuri.city

Dhuri is a town in Sangrur District in the state of Punjab, India. The neighbouring towns of Dhuri are Sangrur, Malerkotla, Nabha, and Barnala.

== Demographics ==
As of 2011 Indian Census, Dhuri had a total population of 55,225 of which 29,231 were males and 25,994 were females. Population within the age group of 0 to 6 years was 6,169. The total number of literates in Dhuri was 40,067, which constituted 72.6% of the population with male literacy of 76.4% and female literacy of 68.2%. The effective literacy rate of 7+ population of Dhuri was 81.7%, of which male literacy rate was 86.4% and female literacy rate was 76.4%. The Scheduled Castes population was 14,207. Dhuri had 30460 households in 11077. Dhuri rural had a total population of 3,529, of which 1,875 were males and 1,654 were females. Population within the age group of 0 to 6 years was 355. The total number of literates in Dhuri was 2,331.

The table below shows the population of different religious groups in Dhuri, as of 2011 census.

Population by religious groups in Dhuri, 2011 census
Religion	Total	Female	Male
Hindu	34,820	16,370	18,450
Sikh	19,006	8,990	10,016
Muslim	932	408	524
Jain	309	145	164
Christian	67	39	28
Buddhist	17	7	10
Other religions	20	8	12
Not stated	54	27	27
Total	55,225	25,994	29,231

== Transportation ==
Dhuri Junction Railway Station mainly serves Dhuri town. The station is situated under Ambala railway division of Northern Railway zone.

== Notable people ==
- Binnu Dhillon, actor and comedian
- Manjit Bawa, painter
- Rana Ranbir, actor and comedian
