= Sunam =

City in Punjab, India dist sangrur

Sunam Udham Singh Wala
- Town
- Sunam
- Location in Punjab, India Sunam Udham Singh Wala (India)
- Coordinates: 30.13°N 75.8°E
- Country: India
- State: Punjab
- District: Sangrur
- Named for: Udham Singh
- Elevation: 231 m (758 ft)

Population (2015)
  - Total: 124,590
- Time zone: UTC+5:30 (IST)
- Postal code: 148028
- Vehicle registration: PB 44
- Website: www.sunamhelpline.com www.bhaimoolchand.com

Sunam is a town and a tehsil, near the city of Sangrur in Sangrur district in the Indian state of Punjab. The Railway Station of Sunam was renamed as Sunam Udham Singh Wala.

== History ==
Sunam is listed in the Ain-i-Akbari as a pargana under the sarkar of Sirhind, producing a revenue of 7,067,696 dams for the imperial treasury and supplying a force of 2000 infantry and 500 cavalry. It had a brick fort at the time. It was one of the many towns under the rule of Wazir Khan.

== Geography ==
Sunam is located at 30.13°N 75.8°E. It has an average elevation of 231 m (758 ft). Sunam falls under the district of Sangrur. Located on the Ludhiana-Hisar railway line, it is connected, by road with Sangrur (13 km), Patiala (64 km), Ludhiana (90 km), Bathinda (95 km), and Chandigarh (129 km).

== Demographics ==
As of the 2011 India census, Sunam had a population of 334,641. Males constitute 53.3% of the population and females 46.7%. Sunam has an average literacy rate of 75.6%, higher than the national average of 74.04%: male literacy is 79.6%, and female literacy is 71%. In Sunam, 11% of the population is under 6 years of age.

The table below shows the population of different religious groups in Sunam Udham Singh Wala city, as of 2011 census.

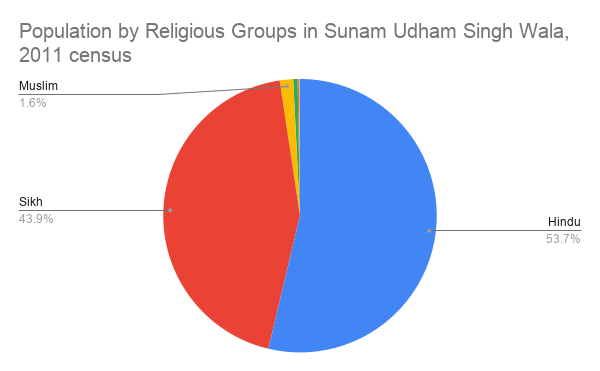

Population by religious groups in Sunam Udham Singh Wala city, 2011 census
Religion	Total	Female	Male
Hindu	37,101	17,389	19,712
Sikh	30,326	14,277	16,049
Muslim	1,090	520	570
Jain	357	171	186
Christian	100	46	54
Buddhist	10	2	8
Other religions	46	24	22
Not stated	39	16	23
Total	69,069	32,451	36,618

== Politics ==
The city is part of the Sangrur Lok Sabha constituency.

== Landmarks ==
=== Samadh Baba Bhai Mool Chand Sahib Ji ===
This is a place in Sunam where people from all religions/communities come to pay homage to a great saint of the 17th century. Descendants of his legacy are known as 'Bhaike' as they all are from a small village near Sunam named 'Bhai Ki Pishour'. Once every year they congregate in this ancestral village named ' Chhajjli' app. 10 km from Sunam, of theirs in a social gathering known as 'Babe Mitti'.

=== Peer Banna Banoi ===
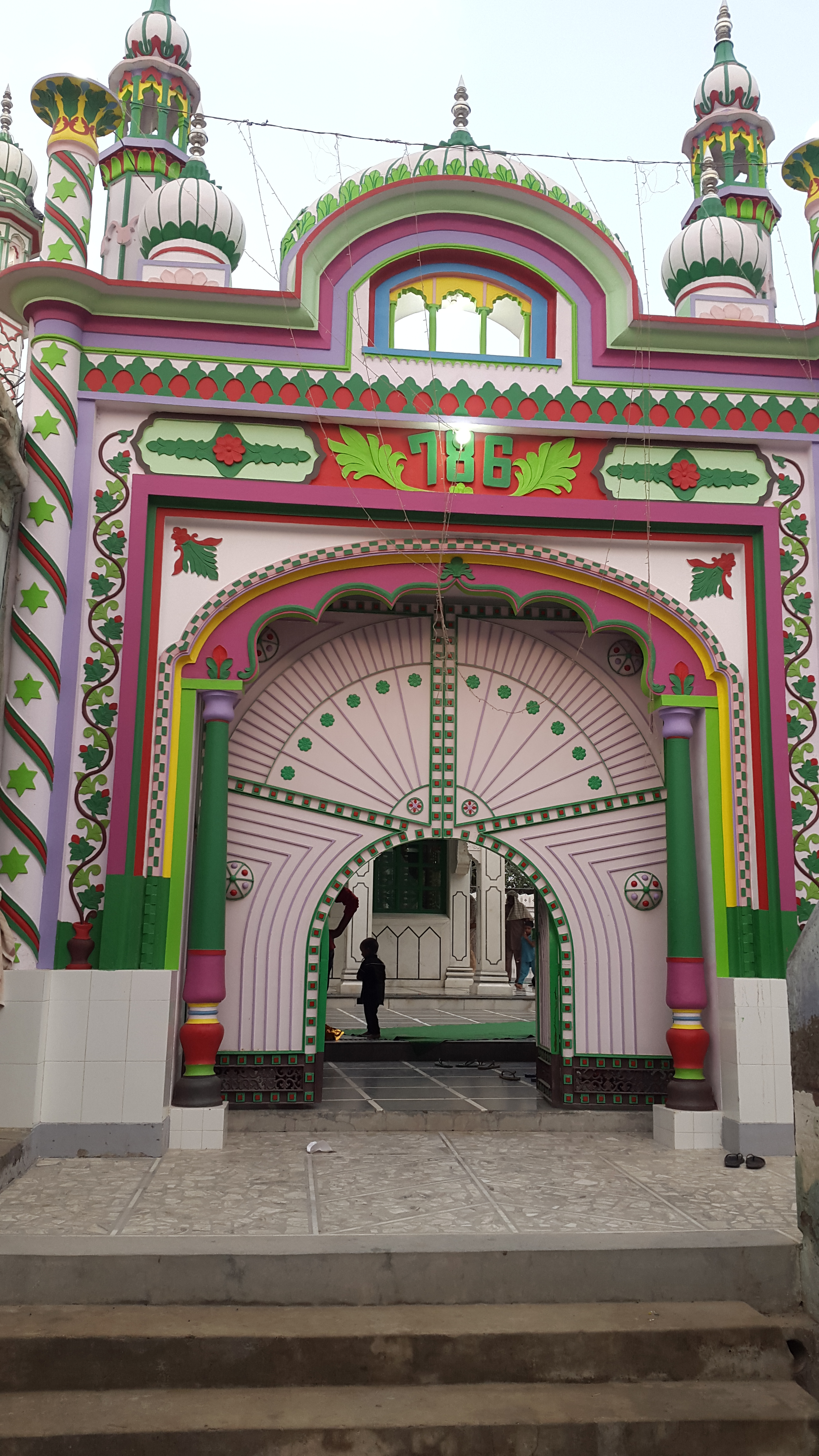
Peer Banna Banoi, Sunam

Before Partition of Punjab, Sunam's population was predominantly Muslim, legend has it that if there would have been 1 more peer it would have been the first 'Peergah' (Makka) in the region with 100 peers but that did not happen as 1 peer lies just outside the boundary of the city and now Muslim Community constitutes about 15 families in Sunam. Peer Banna Banoi is an Islamic shrine in Sunam. People of all faiths pay homage as Peer Banna Banoi was a God-fearing and true Muslim who sacrificed his life on the day of his marriage to save the Hindu and Sikh girls from being kidnapped by the armed goons.

== Industries and trade ==
Sunam has a grain market, wholesale cloth market, wholesale utensils market and a Sarafa Bazar (Gold Jeweller's Market) in Town Side area of Sunam. Naya Bazaar and Peeran Wala Gate are the main bazaars of Sunam.

== Education ==
Sunam has three colleges, the Guru Nanak Dev Dental College Sunam, Shaheed Udham Singh Govt College Sunam and Ajit Nursing Institute Sunam.

=== Hindu Sabha High School ===
This is one of the three oldest public high schools of Sunam. Hindu Sabha High School Sunam was started on 19 February 1948. Sh. Karta Ram Jindal was the headmaster from 1965 till 1992 for almost 30 years, During his tenure school grew from 100 students to 2000 students. The school celebrated its silver jubilee in 1973 and Education Minister Umrao Singh inaugurated school's biggest assembly hall. This school is a non-profit and semi-government school. Later the school was upgraded to Senior Secondary school. Also Hindu Sabha College for Women was started for Arts and other subjects.

== Notable people ==
- Shaheed Udham Singh: Sunam is the birthplace of Shaheed Udham Singh, who shot former British Indian governor Michael O'Dwyer in revenge for his support of the notorious Jallianwala Bagh massacre on 13 March 1940.
