= Sangrur Municipal Council =

Administration of Sangrur, Punjab

Type
- Type: Municipal Council

Leadership
- Minister in charge: Inderbir Singh Nijjar
- President: Vacant
- Vice-President: Vacant

Structure
- Seats: 29
- Political groups: AAP (9); INC (9); Independent (8); BJP (3)
- Length of term: 5 Years

Elections
- Last election: February 2015
- Next election: 21 December 2024

Website
- Official website

The Sangrur Municipal Council is a nagar palika (municipal council) which administers the city of Sangrur, Punjab. It has 27 members elected with a first-past-the-post voting system and one ex-officio member which is MLA for Sangrur.

== President ==
The president of Sangrur is the elected chief of the Municipal Council of Sangrur. The president is the first citizen of the city. The president shall be the Chairman of the Standing Committee. Municipal Council elects one of its elected members as the president.

S. No.	Name	Took office	Left office	Tenure	Party	Ward No.	Ref.
-	Iqbaljit Singh Punia	January 2011			SAD	3	
-	Ripudaman Singh Dhillon		10 March 2020		SAD	27	

== Ex-officio members ==
Member of legislative assembly from Sangrur represents as the ex-officio member in the council.

Members of Legislative Assembly
Election	Member	Picture	Party
1957	Rajinder Singh		Indian National Congress
1962	Hardit Singh		Communist Party of India
1967	J. Singh		Akali Dal – Sant Fateh Singh Group
1969	Gurbaksh Singh		Indian National Congress
1972	Gurbaksh Singh		Indian National Congress
1977	Gurdial Singh		Janata Party
1980	Sukhdev Singh Dhindsa		Shiromani Akali Dal
1985	Ranjit Singh		Shiromani Akali Dal
1992	Jasbir Singh		Indian National Congress
1997	Ranjit Singh		Shiromani Akali Dal
2002	Arvind Khanna		Indian National Congress
2007	Surinder Pal Singh Sibia		Indian National Congress
2012	Parkash Chand Garg		Shiromani Akali Dal
2017	Vijay Inder Singla		Indian National Congress
2022	Narinder Kaur Bharaj		Aam Aadmi Party

== Elections ==
Years				Others	Total
Years	INC	SAD	BJP	Others	Total
2015	5	13	6	3	27
2023	TBA				29
