= Bhawanigarh =

Bhawanigarh Dhode
- Town
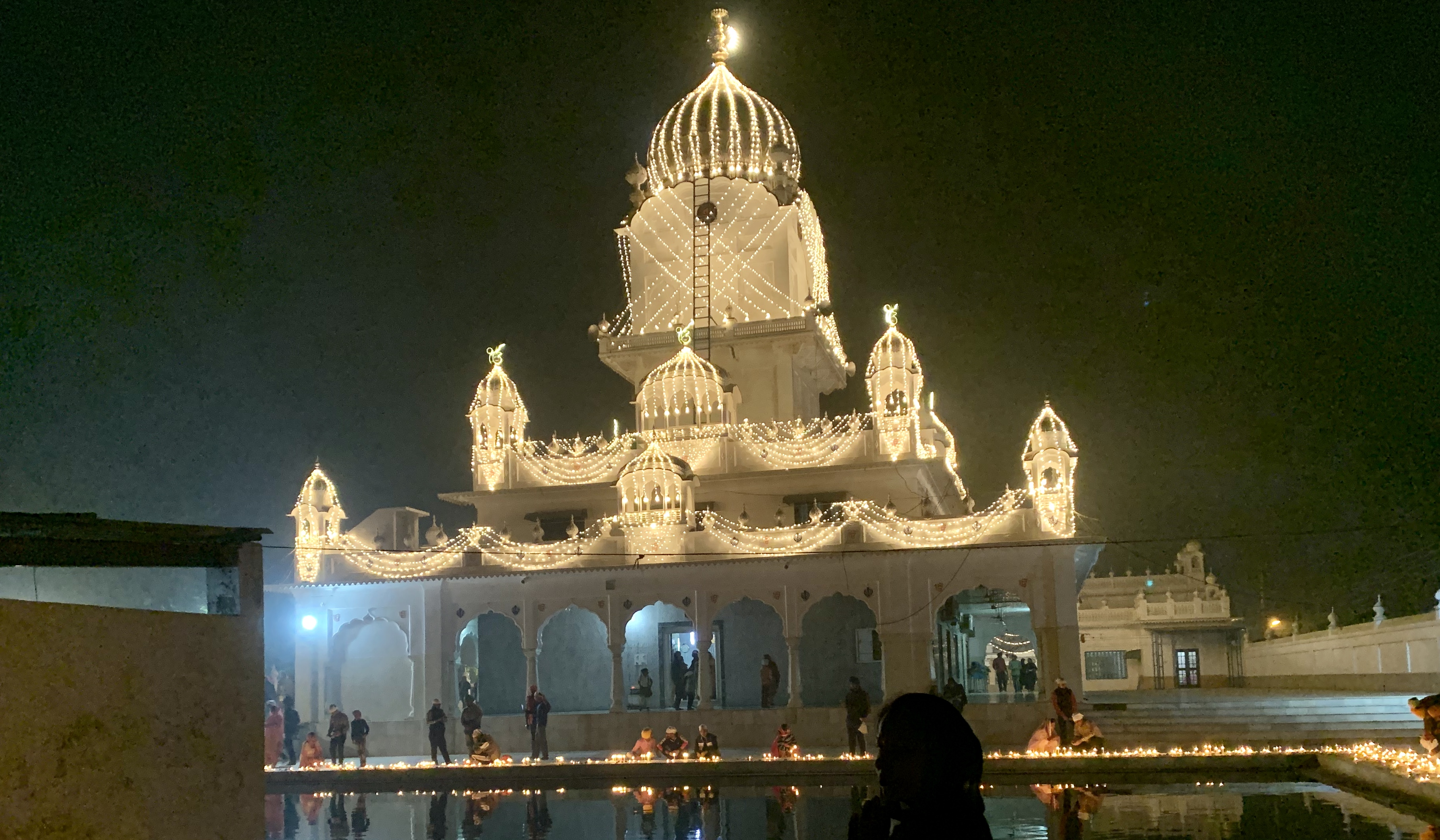
- Rear view of Gurdwara Patshahi Nauvi, Bhawanigarh

- Logo

- Location in Punjab, India Bhawanigarh (India)
- Coordinates: 30.27°N 76.04°E
- Country: India
- State: Punjab
- Region of Punjab: Malwa
- District: Sangrur
- Municipality: 1945

Government
  - Type: Municipal council
  - Body: Municipal Council Bhawanigarh
  - President: Avtar Singh
  - Vice President: Karamjit Kaur
  - Chairman: Pardeep Mittal (Note: Market Committee); Darshan Singh Kalajhar (Note: Block Samiti)
  - MP: Gurmeet Singh Meet Hayer (AAP)
  - MLA: Narinder Kaur Bharaj (AAP)

Area
  - Town: 6.0 km^{2} (2.3 sq mi)
  - Metro: 323.11 km^{2} (124.75 sq mi)
- Elevation: 241 m (791 ft)

Population (2011)
  - Town: 22,320
  - Density: 3,700/km^{2} (9,600/sq mi)
  - Metro: 104,507

Languages
  - Official: Punjabi
- Time zone: UTC+5:30 (IST)
- Postal code: 148026
- Vehicle registration: PB-84

Bhawanigarh, earlier known as Dhode, is a town and a municipal council (Class-2) in the Sangrur district in the state of Punjab, India. It is also the headquarters of Bhawanigarh tehsil, which was formed in December 2016. The town is also called Dhode, after the clan of its original founders. The town lies 19 kilometres east of Sangrur on the Patiala-Sangrur road whereas Patiala is 39 kilometres east of Bhawanigarh. The literacy rate is higher than other places of Sangrur. Bhawanigarh is divided into 15 wards. The Bhawanigarh block consists of 66 villages in the Sangrur district.

== History ==
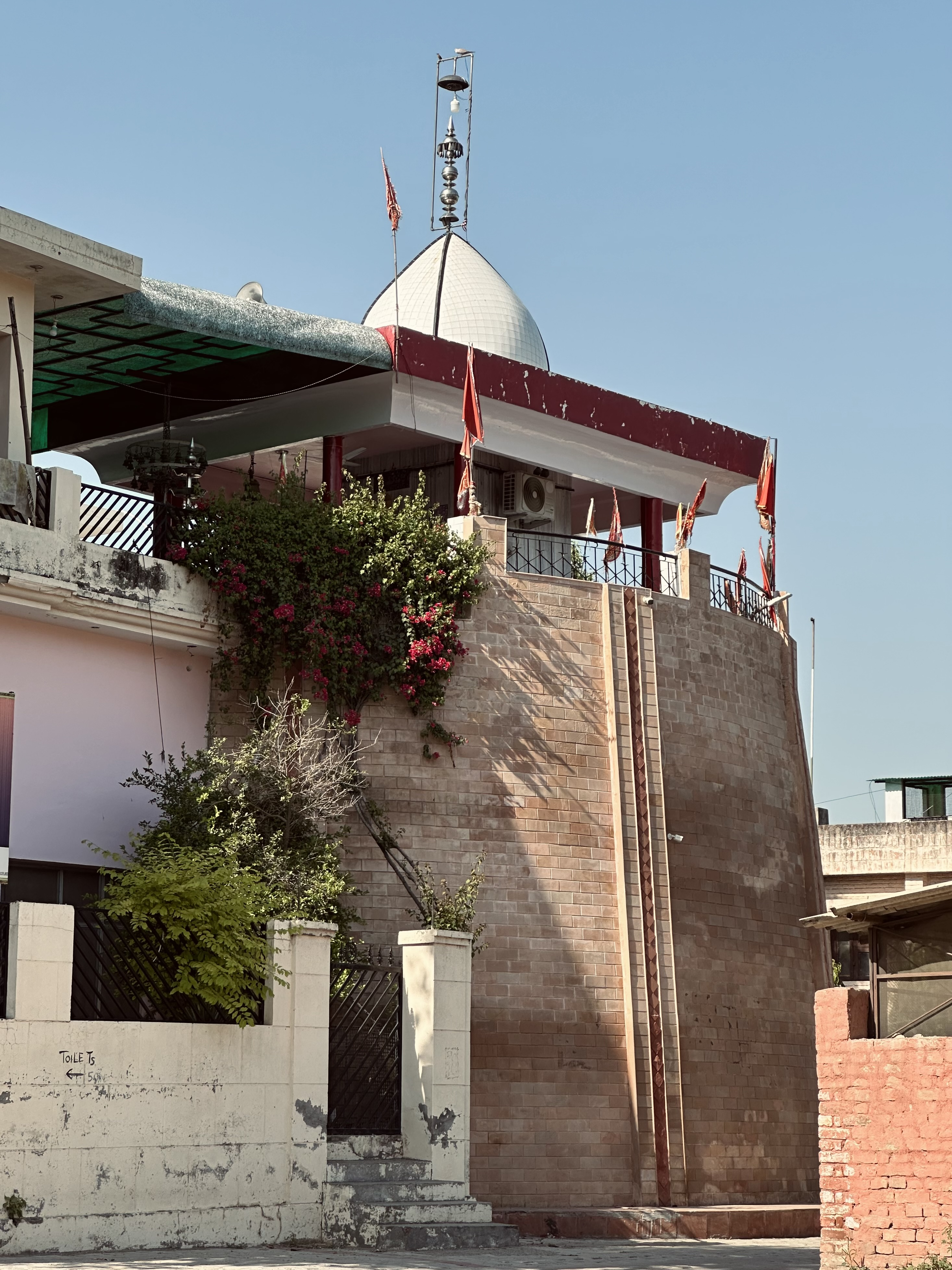
Temple of Bhavani mata in Bhawanigarh

The name Bhawanigarh originates from "Bhawani" mata, the Hindu goddess. There is a temple of Bhawani mata in the town. Earlier, the town was known as Dhode and was a tehsil of Karamgarh nizamat of Patiala Princely State. In 1749, Ala Singh built a fort in the town, and defeated Farid Khan, a Rajput Chieftain who stopped the construction of the fort through imperial governor. In 1799, George Thomas, Raja of Hansi attacked Jind and defeated forces of Patiala, Kaithal, Jind and Ladva, and imposed terms of friendship. But soon after he broke the truce and took possession of Bhawanigarh, Fatehabad, Sunam and Narangval, and was defeated later when he invaded Kaithal. In May 1834, Phulkian chiefs of Patiala, Nabha, Jind and Kaithal signed an agreement in Bhawanigarh. Till 1919, Bhawanigarh was the headquarter of Karamgarh, later the headquarters were shifted to Sunam. The town was named "Dhode" after the clan of Jats of Dhodan, a sub-clan of Bajha clan. The town received status of municipal committee in 1945. In July 2016, municipal council of the town was promoted to Class-II. In December 2016, Sukhbir Singh Badal, then Deputy Chief Minister of Punjab announced sub-division and tehsil status to Bhawanigarh.

== Administration ==
Panchayat Samiti Wards of Bhawanigarh Block

The Bhawanigarh sub-division of Sangrur district consists of 66 villages, and a total population of 104,507 people.

Sub Divisional Magistrate Office Bhawanigarh

=== Local government ===
The city is governed by a civic administration or local government headed by Sub-Divisional Magistrate Manjeet Kaur and President of Bhawanigarh Municipal Council, which is vacant since April 2026. The town comprises 15 wards represented by 15 elected councillors.

== Geography ==
Bhawanigarh

Climate chart (precipitation, max. and min. temperature)
J	F	M	A	M	J	J	A	S	O	N	D
37 21 9	45 24 11	28 32 16	20 38 24	32 43 30	46 43 32	207 39 30	247 36 27	173 35 25	12 35 23	6 29 18	10 24 12
- █ Average max. and min. temperatures in °C
- █ Precipitation totals in mm
- Source: World Weather Online
Imperial conversion
J	F	M	A	M	J	J	A	S	O	N	D
1.5 70 48	1.8 75 52	1.1 90 61	0.8 100 75	1.3 109 86	1.8 109 90	8.1 102 86	9.7 97 81	6.8 95 77	0.5 95 73	0.2 84 64	0.4 75 54
- █ Average max. and min. temperatures in °F
- █ Precipitation totals in inches

== Demographics ==
As of 2011 India census, Bhawanigarh has population of 22,320 out of which 11,780 are males whereas females are 10,540. Population of children (age:0-6) is 2422 which is 10.85% of total. Female Sex Ratio of Bhawanigarh is 895 whereas child sex ratio is 862. literacy rate of Bhawanigarh is 77.56% which is higher than state average. In Bhawanigarh, Male literacy is around 82.60% while female literacy rate is 71.95%.

Religion in Bhawanigarh
Religion	Percent
Sikhism	54.17%
Hinduism	43.13%
Islam	2.52%
Others	0.20%

Bhawanigarh
Year	Pop.	±%
1951	4,253	—
1961	5,437	+27.8%
1971	6,706	+23.3%
1981	9,817	+46.4%
1991	13,900	+41.6%
2001	17,792	+28.0%
2011	22,320	+25.4%

== Economy ==
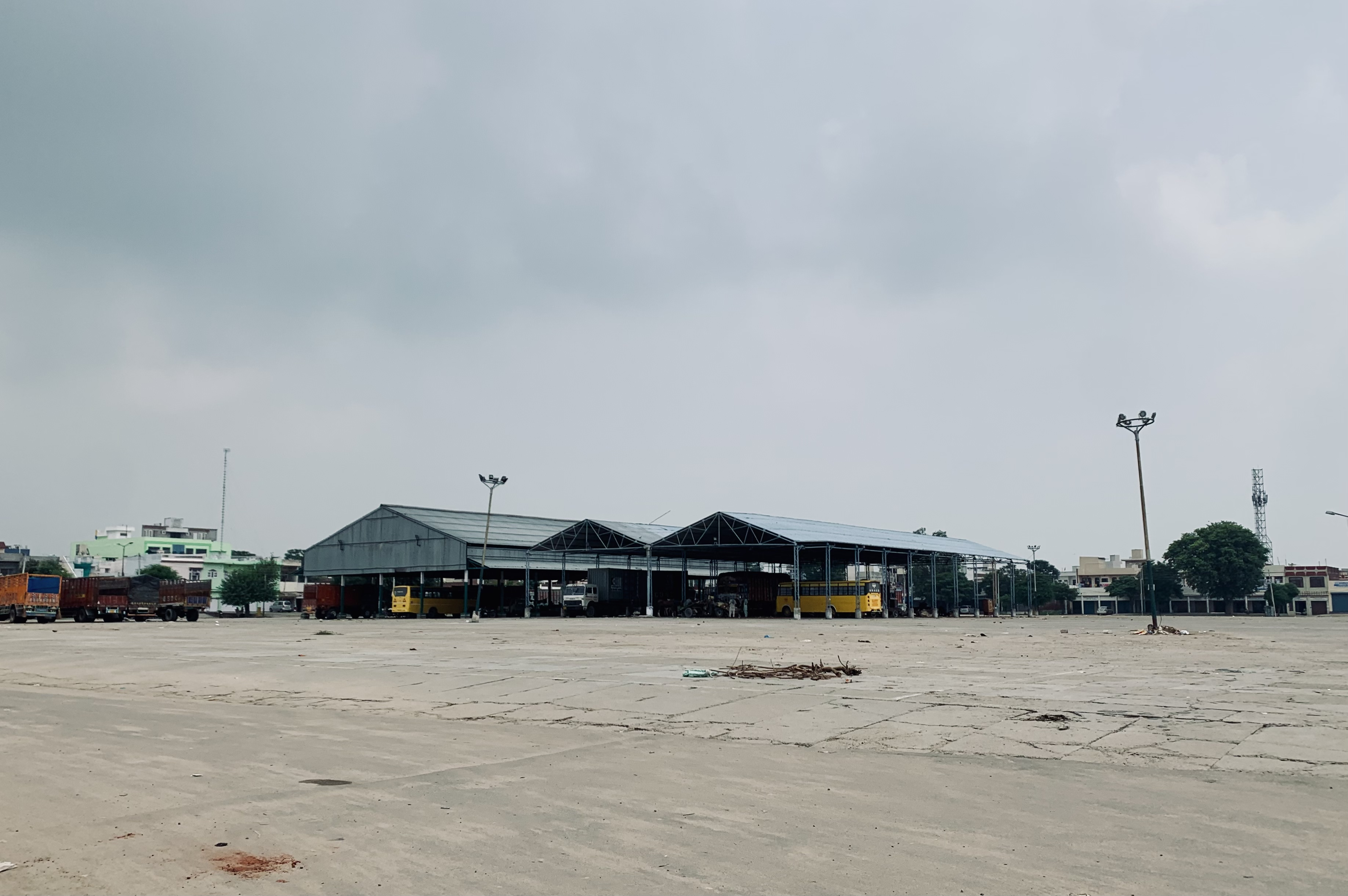
Grain Market, Bhawanigarh

== Places of interest ==
=== Gurduara Sahib Patshahi Nauvi ===
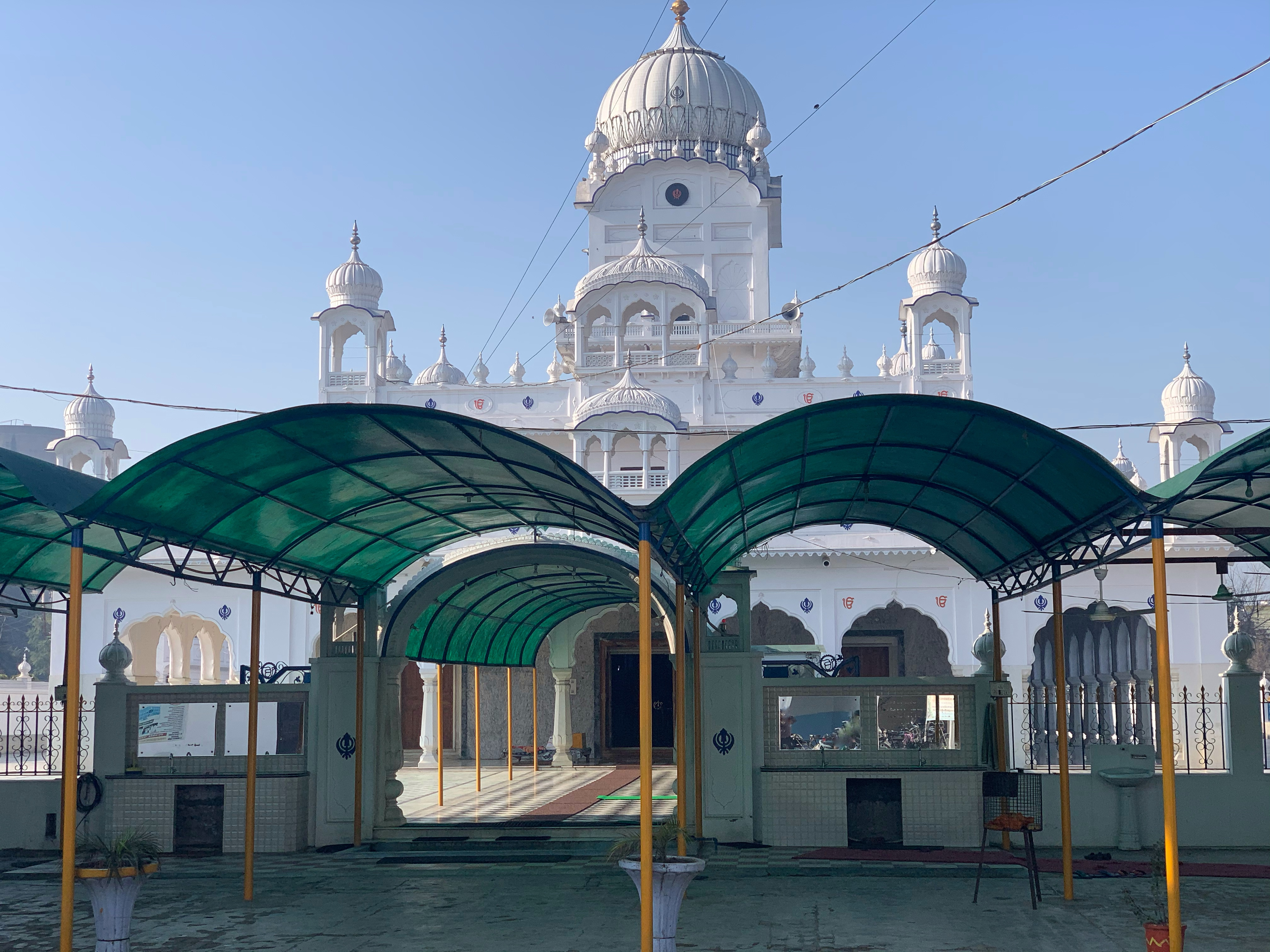

Guru Tegh Bahadur stayed here during one of his journeys through the Malwa country. The original memorial on the spot where the guru had stayed was in time developed into a gurdwara called Gurudwara Sahib Patshahi Nauvi. Gurudwara Patshahi Nauvi Sabhib is situated in the Bhawanigarh Town in District Sangrur. Guru Tegh Bahadur accepting the invitation of King of Assam, started journey from Shri Anandpur Sahib along with the 300 sangat and carrying necessary commodities for 3 years journey visited this place and stayed here for 2 days. On his two days stay Guru Sahib used perform kirtan darbar here. From here they resumed the journey via Phaguwala, Gharanchon and Ghanaur. With Guru Sahib's blessings peoples wishes are fulfilled here.

The present gurudwara, consisting of a rectangular hall in front of a semi-octagonal sanctum with verandahs on three sides, was constructed in 1916. A small sarovar was added in the 1980s. The gurdwara owns 140 acres (0.57 km^{2}) of agricultural land and is now managed through a local committee by the Shiromani Gurdwara Prabandhak Committee. The gurudwara's budget for 1990-91 shows rental income from land alone as ₹210,000.

=== Bhawanigarh Fort ===
Bhawanigarh Fort was built by Maharaja Aala Singh of Patiala in 1749 for their defense. In 1781, Sahib Singh became king of Patiala at age of seven. In 1794, Marathas attacked Punjab and fought against Rani Sahib Kaur's force and finally Marathas lost the war. But because of some traitors Rani Sahib Kaur was imprisoned in Bhawanigarh Fort by Maharaja Sahib Singh. Rani escaped from the fort and lived in Ubhawal and died there in 1799.

=== Shri Guru Teg Bahadur Stadium ===
Shri Guru Teg Bahadur Stadium situated near the police station. It is of approximately 5 acres in area. The stadium was built for an est. ₹2.5 crore.

=== Radha Krishna Temple ===
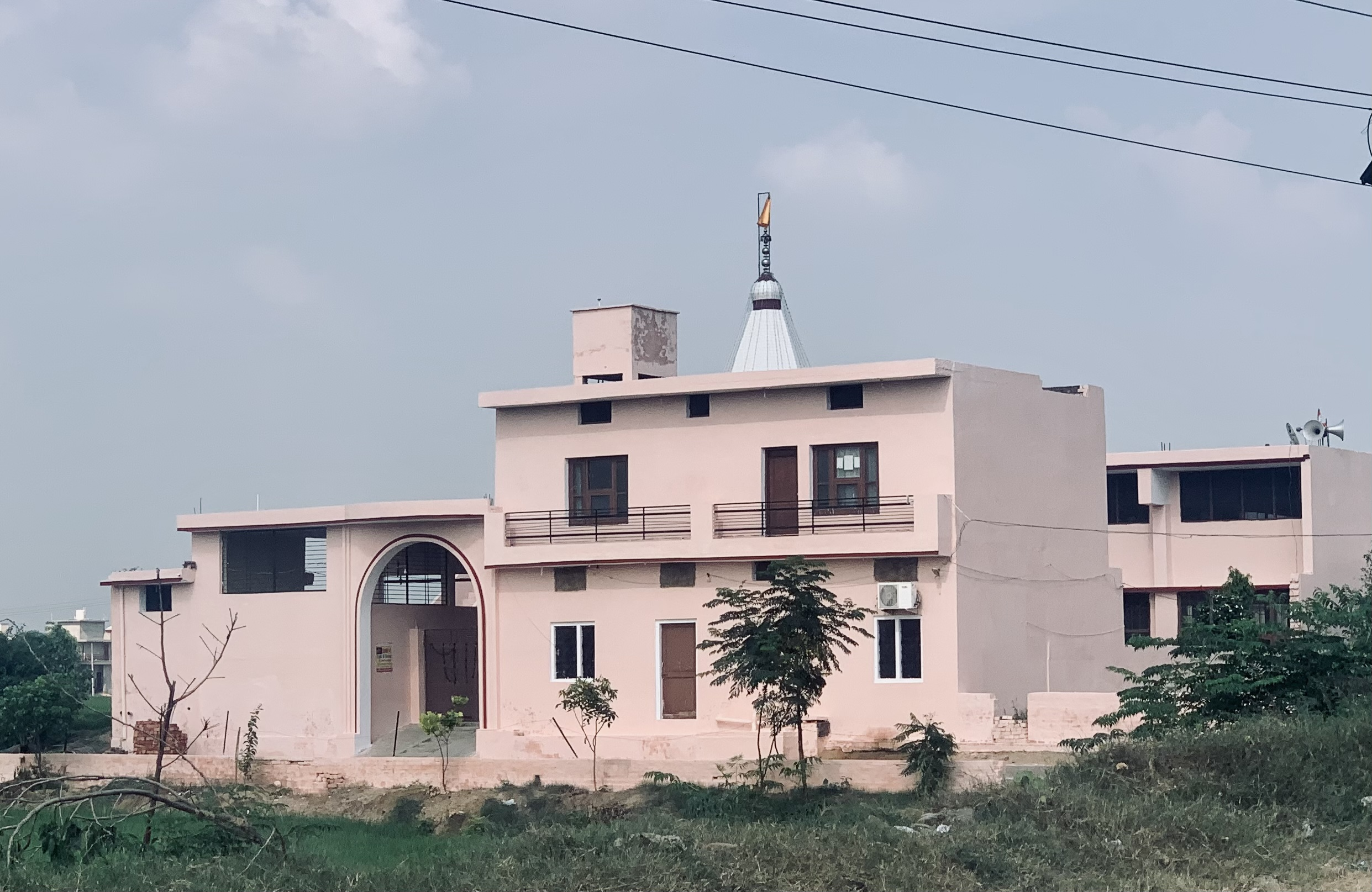
Radha Krishna Temple, Bhawanigarh

== Transportation ==
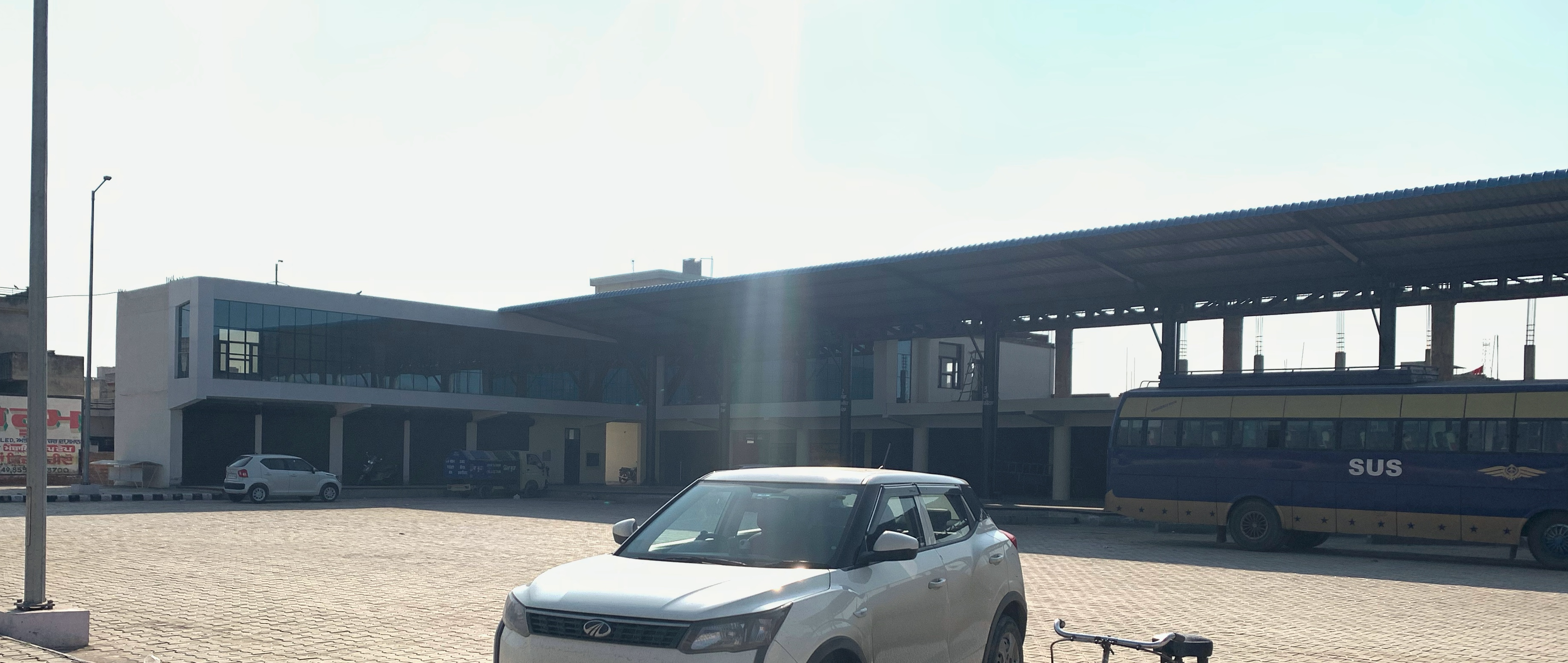
Municipal Council complex and Bus stand of Bhawanigarh.

Bhawanigarh is settled along the National Highway 7. The town is well linked to Sangrur, Patiala, Sunam, Rajpura, Chandigarh, Mansa, and Bathinda through the road. The town is connected to Nabha through state highway SH 12A while is also connected to Samana.

The town consists of two bus stands generally known as "Old Bus Stand" and "New Bus Stand". Though the town lies on national highway has good bus service and the most of buses including public and private have two bus stops in the town. The construction of the "New Bus Stand" costing around ₹2.5 crore was completed in 2021, and it was inaugurated by Vijay Inder Singla in January 2021.

== Educational Institutions ==
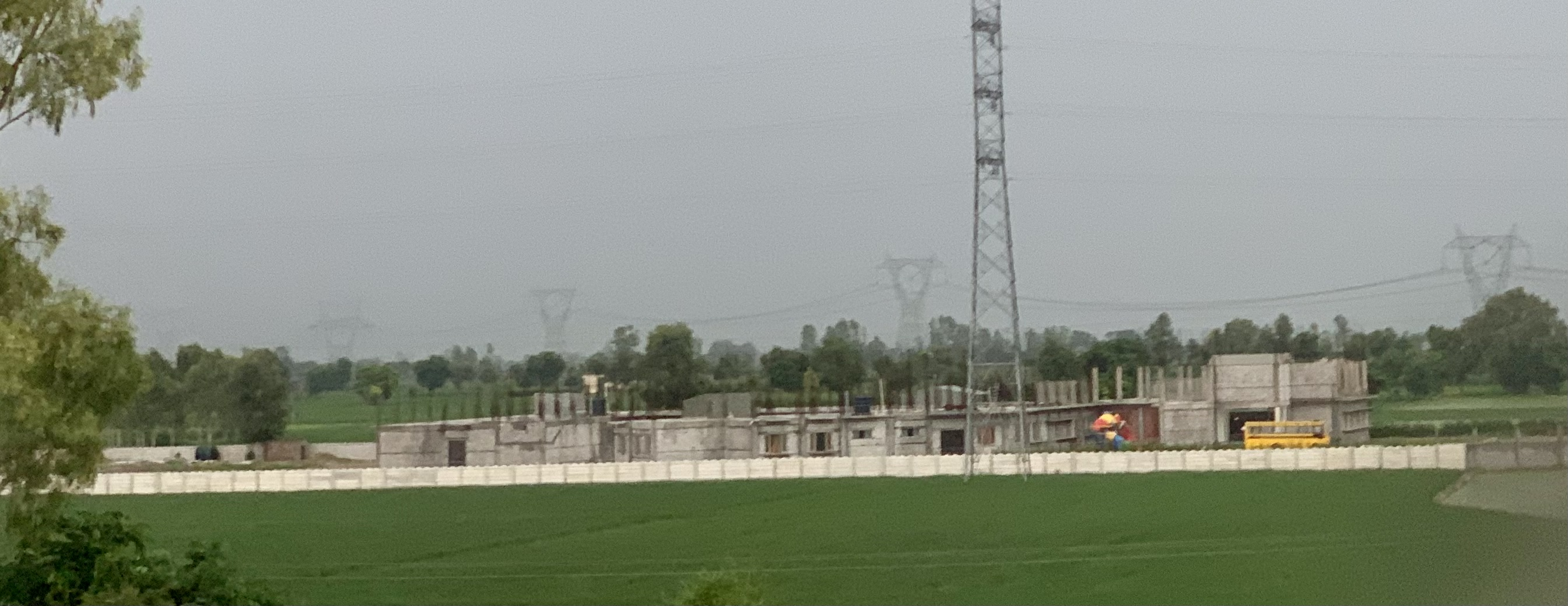
A new ICSE school under construction near Bhawanigarh.

As per Census of 2011, there are 14 primary schools, 6 middle schools, 2 secondary, 2 senior secondary schools, and one arts/science college in the town.

=== Guru Nanak Convent School ===
Guru Nanak Convent School, is one of the oldest institution of city Bhawanigarh. It was established by M.S. Toor and the founder principal was Paramjit Kaur. This institution is a Sikh minority community institution, situated in middle of the city near old bus stand, Bhawanigarh. This institution serves students to study form elementary classes to senior secondary classes under affiliation from Central Board of Secondary Education. Guru Nanak Convent School bears 'A' Grade Accreditation from Ministry of Education Govt. of India.

=== Guru Nanak Institute of Management and Technology ===
This institution is affiliated to Lovely Professional University, Jalandhar for Distance Education Programmes. People may opt for many courses under the streams Art, Commerce, Computer Science, Information and technology, Management and Library Sciences.

=== Convent Montessori ===
This institution is situated at Balyal Road Bhawanigarh. Serves as kindergarten / crech for children having age 3 to 6 years.

=== Guru Tegh Bhadur College ===
This institution is affiliated to Punjabi University Patiala, it offers all the courses under stream Arts and computer sciences. This is the oldest college in the town, it was established by Mehma Singh Grewal, it is run by a charitable trust.

== Notable people ==
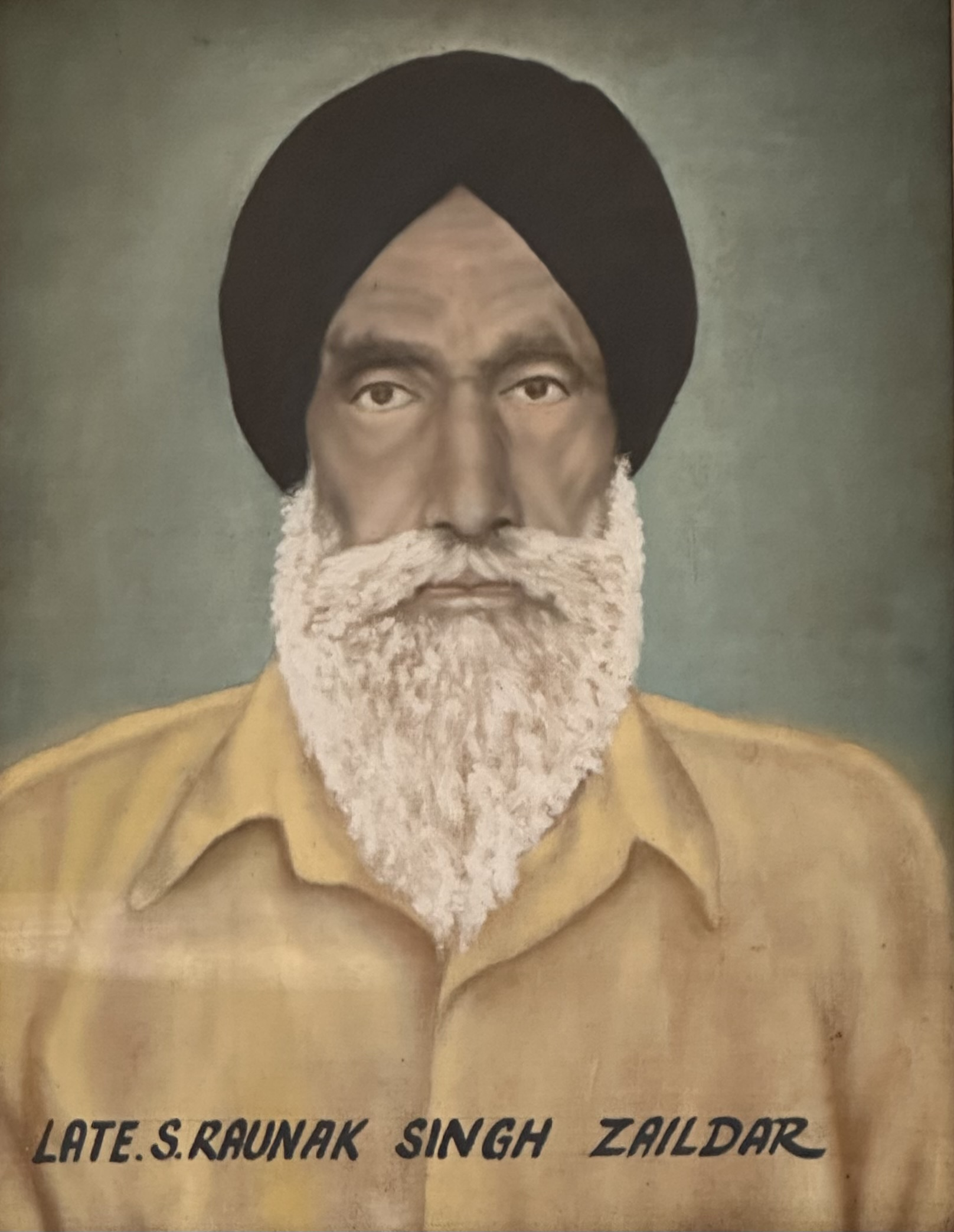
Raunak Singh Zaildar, one of the founding members of Bhawanigarh Municipal Committee and councillor for over twenty years.

- Narinder Kaur Bharaj, current MLA of Sangrur, from Bharaj village of Bhawanigarh block
- Parkash Chand Garg, former MLA of Sangrur from 2012 to 2017
