= Phaguwala =

- Village
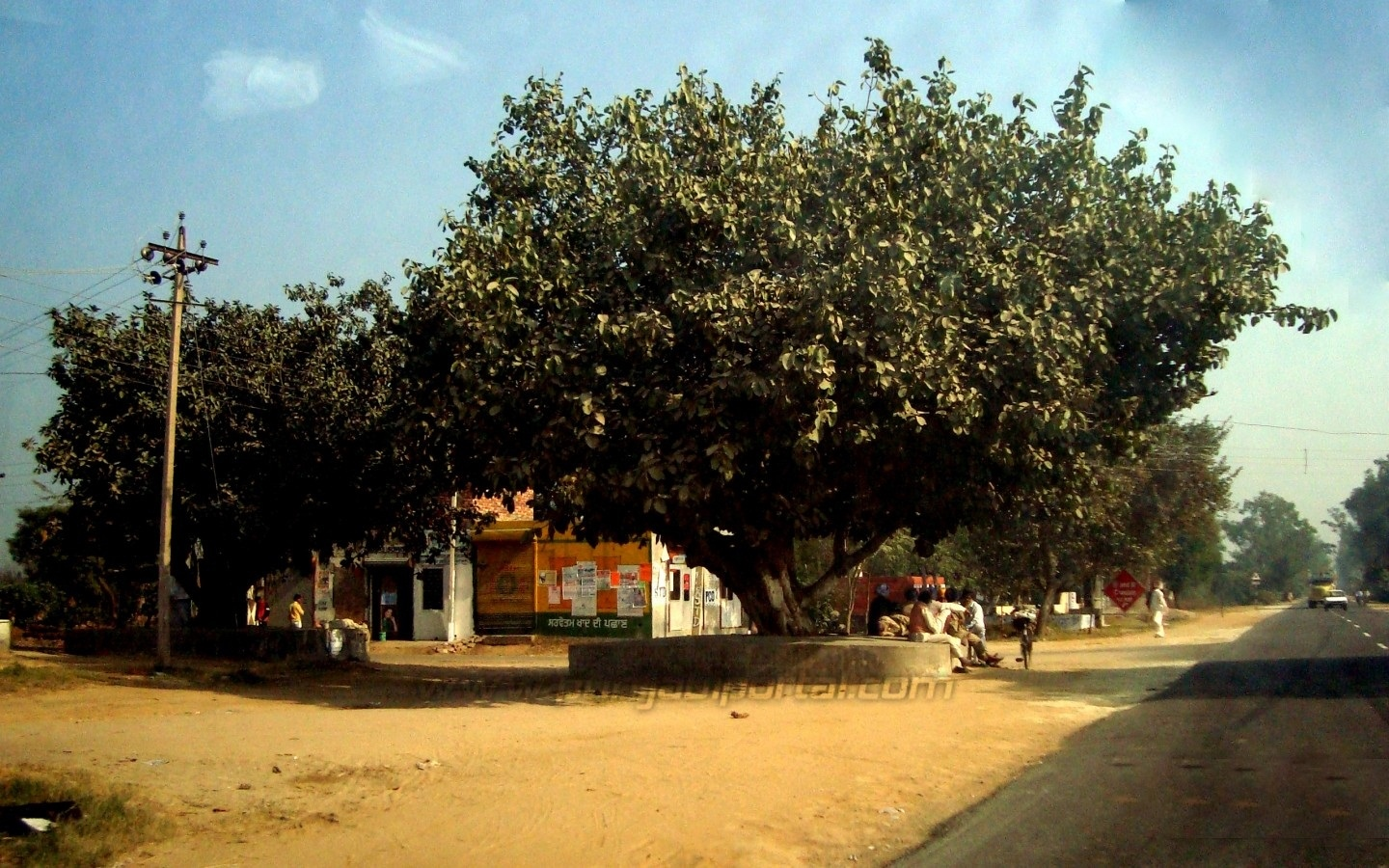
- Front view of Phaguwala
- Interactive map of Phaguwala
- Country: India
- State: Punjab
- District: Sangrur
- Elevation: 252 m (827 ft)

Population
  - Total: 2,354 (2,011 census)

Languages
  - Official: Punjabi
- Time zone: UTC+5:30 (IST)
- PIN: 148026
- Telephone code: 91 01672
- Vehicle registration: PB 13-/ PB 84-
- Nearest city: Bhawanigarh
- Literacy: 94%
- Lok Sabha constituency: Mr. Bhagwant Mann
- Vidhan Sabha constituency: Mr Vijay Inder Singla (Congress)
- Climate: Extreme hot in summers and Extreme cold in winters

Phaguwala is a village located 19 kilometers east of the city of Sangrur and 40 kilometers from Patiala on NH-7 in the district of Sangrur in the state of Punjab, India.

== Politics ==
Gram (village) Panchayat of Phaguwala is the local body responsible for governing, developing, and managing the village. It includes a Sarpanch and members. Phaguwala is divided into 9 wards and one member is elected from each ward.

Phaguwala comes under Lok Sabha and Vidhan Sabha constituency seat of Sangrur.
