= Major Mohit Sharma Rajendra Nagar metro station =

Metro station in Uttar Pradesh, India

Major Mohit Sharma Rajendra Nagar

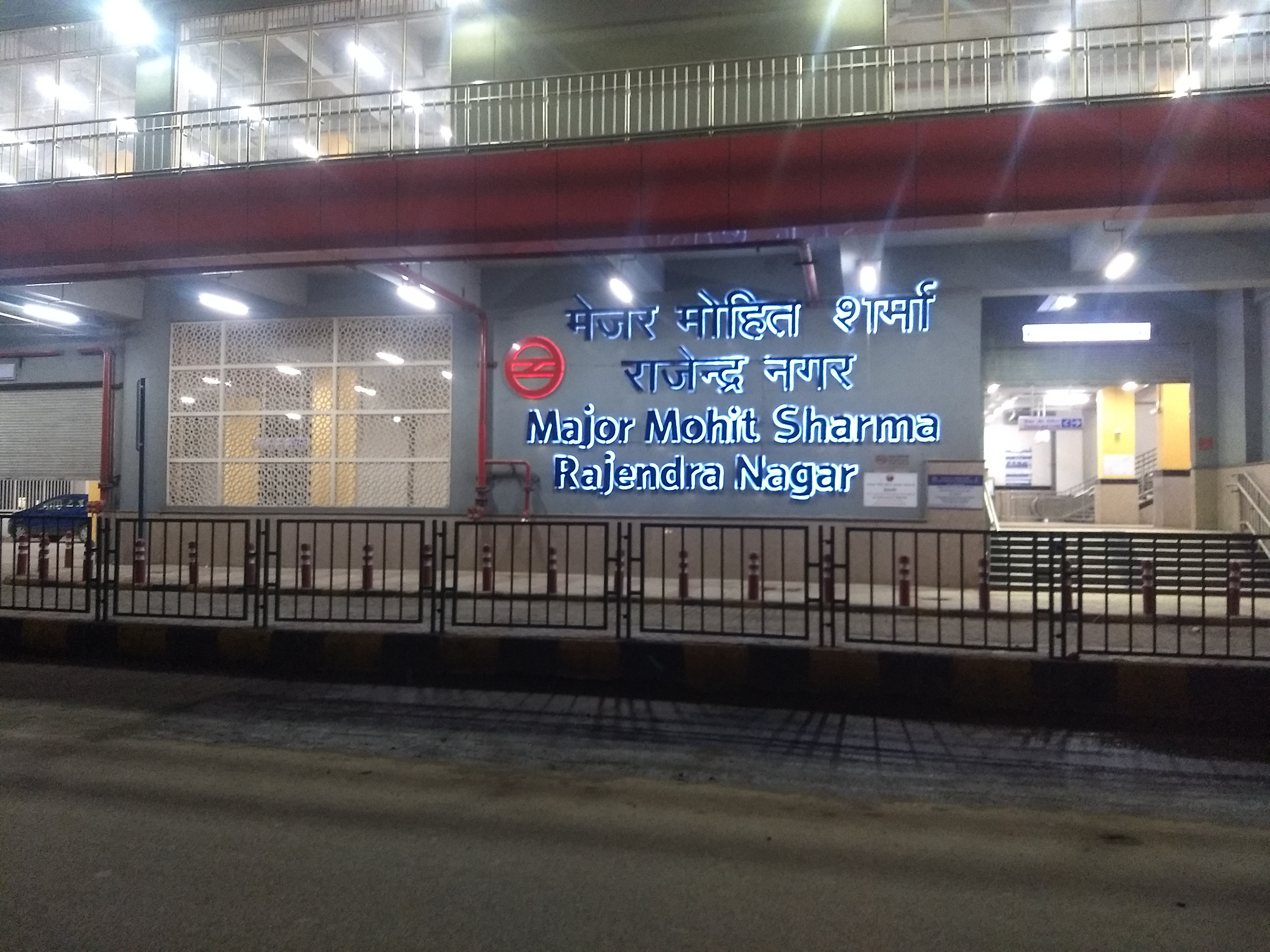

General information
- Location: GT Road, Sahibabad Industrial Area, Rajendra Nagar, Ghaziabad, Uttar Pradesh 201005
- Coordinates: 28°40′39″N 77°21′30″E
- System: Delhi Metro station
- Owner: Delhi Metro Rail Corporation
- Line: Red Line
- Platforms: Side platform Platform-1 → Rithala; Platform-2 → Shaheed Sthal (New Bus Adda)
- Tracks: 2

Construction
- Structure type: Elevated
- Platform levels: 2
- Accessible: Yes

Other information
- Station code: RJNM

History
- Opened: 8 March 2019
- Electrified: 25 kV 50 Hz AC through overhead catenary

Services
Preceding station	Delhi Metro	Following station
Raj Bagh towards Rithala	Red Line	Shyam Park towards Shaheed Sthal (New Bus Adda)
Route map
Location

Major Mohit Sharma Rajendra Nagar is an elevated metro station on the Red Line of the Delhi Metro, located in the Sahibabad Industrial Area of Ghaziabad, Uttar Pradesh. Originally named Rajendra Nagar, the station was renamed in honour of Major Mohit Sharma, an Indian Army officer who was posthumously awarded the Ashoka Chakra for his gallantry in action.

== History ==
The Dilshad Garden–New Bus Adda extension of the Red Line, which includes Major Mohit Sharma Rajendra Nagar station, was developed under an agreement signed between the Ghaziabad Development Authority (GDA) and the Delhi Metro Rail Corporation (DMRC) in June 2014. Initial trial runs on the 9.41-kilometre elevated corridor began in August 2018. The extension was inaugurated on 8 March 2019, and commercial passenger services commenced the following day, 9 March 2019, at 8:00 a.m.

== Station layout ==
L2	Side platform | Doors will open on the left
L2	Platform 2 Eastbound	Towards → Shaheed Sthal (New Bus Adda); Next Station: Shyam Park
L2	Platform 1 Westbound	Towards ← Rithala; Next Station: Raj Bagh
L2	Side platform | Doors will open on the left
L1	Concourse	Fare control, station agent, Metro Card vending machines, crossover
G	Street level	Exit/Entrance

== Facilities ==
The station is situated near commercial establishments in Rajendra Nagar, including shopping outlets, restaurants and a cinema. Sahibabad Junction, which serves the Indian Railways network, is also located in the surrounding area.

== See also ==
- List of Delhi Metro stations
- Transport in Delhi
- Delhi Metro Rail Corporation
- Delhi Suburban Railway
- List of rapid transit systems in India
- Delhi Transport Corporation
- List of Metro Systems
- National Capital Region (India)
- Ghaziabad district, Uttar Pradesh
