= Jasbir Singh =

Jasbir Singh may refer to:

- Jasbir Singh (cricketer)
- Jasbir Singh (politician)
