= Wave City =

Residential & Commercial Location in Uttar Pradesh, India

- Residential Location
- Wave City Main Entrance Gate
- Interactive map of Wave City
- Coordinates: 28.648711°N 77.506123°E
- Country: India
- State: Uttar Pradesh
- District: Ghaziabad
- Project approved: 21 May 2005

Government
  - Body: Ghaziabad Development Authority

Area
  - Total: 1,818.78 ha (4,494.31 acres)

Wave City is a residential & commercial township located along NH9 (previously NH-24) in Ghaziabad, Uttar Pradesh, India.

The township was developed by Uppal Chaddha Developers, a subsidiary of Wave Group, approval and monitoring under Ghaziabad Development Authority (GDA), and under the Uttar Pradesh government's Hi-Tech Township policy. The project covered 4,494.31 acres (1,818.78 ha) in three phases. The nearest metro station from Wave City is Noida Sector 62 metro station.

== History ==
On 21 May 2005, The Uttar Pradesh government approved the proposal of the development of a hi-tech township in Ghaziabad named Wave City. A memorandum of understanding between the Uppal Chaddha Developers and the Ghaziabad Development Authority was signed on 30 November 2005. In a revised MoU covering 4,494 acres was signed in February 2010. This area was divided into three phases. The Construction of buildings began in January 2012 included residential buildings, group housing and commercial buildings. The Wave Group was founded by Ponty Chadha's father, Kulwant Singh Chadha, in 1963.

== Environmental issues ==
The project has involved in many environment related issues. The National Green Tribunal imposed environmental compensation of ₹113.25 crore in February 2023 on 'Wave City' developer Uppal Chaddha in connection with violations relating to water consumption records and sewage treatment plants.

== Civic and regulatory issues ==
Wave City has also been involved in disputes such as civic taxation and development obligations. In 2024, Ghaziabad Development Authority was reported to have required the developer to mortgage property worth approximately ₹400 crore. According to 2009 notification by State Government Wave City and Sun City was given licenses to develop 2 lakh dwelling units. And under this notice Wave Group was supposed to acquire 4400 acres. But due to various reasons, including farmers’ reluctance to part with their land, a portion of the earmarked land could not be acquired and it is reduced from 400 to 4,100 acres.

In the same year, The Ghaziabad Municipal Corporation had issued notices to residents of Wave City, while the Wave disputed the corporation's position regarding the applicability of water, house and sewer taxes.

== Disputes ==
There are several consumer disputes are going on Over Club, Electricity, and Maintenance Charges, in between Wave City and its residents.

In 2026, Delhi Consumer Commission directed Sanchar Nest, a housing project in Wave City by Wave Group, to refund approximately ₹79.43 lakh to two home buyers, along with compensation. The buyers claimed that they had booked the apartments in 2010 and possession had been substantially delayed.

=== Farmers protest ===
Time to time there can be seen farmers' protests against builder.

In September 2025, farmers of wave city protested inside the Ghaziabad Development Authority (GDA) over their alleged unfulfilled demands promised by the developer of the Wave City.

=== Legal battle ===
Several cases related to the Wave City dispute are pending before the Allahabad High Court (AHC) for final hearings. The dispute has raised issues concerning the legal and regulatory challenges associated with large-scale real estate development projects.

== Gallery ==
Wave City Entrance Gate

Wave City Sales Office

Wave City Sales Office

Karyan Street Walk Shopping Complex in Wave City

Veridia Residential Society in Wave City

Gaur NYC Residencial Society (Under construction) in Wave City

Dream Homes Residential Society and Gaur NYC in Wave City

Dream Homes Residential Society in Wave City

Swamanorath Residential Flats in Wave City

Police Station in Wave City

Ch. Chhabil Dass Public School, Wave City Ghaziabad

Panoramic view of Ch. Chhabildass Public School Wave City, Ghaziabad

== See also ==
- Ghaziabad
- Ghaziabad Development Authority
- National Highway 9 (India)
