= Ponty Chadha =

Indian industrialist and philanthropist (1960–2012)

- Born: Gurdeep Singh Chadha; 22 October 1960; Moradabad, Uttar Pradesh, India
- Died: 17 November 2012 (aged 52); New Delhi, India
- Occupations: Industrialist; philanthropist
- Spouse: Jatinder Kaur Chadha
- Children: Manpreet and Harsheen
- Parent(s): Kulwant Singh Chadha (father); Prakash Kaur (mother)
- Relatives: Raju Chadha (brother); Hardeep Chadha (brother)

Gurdeep Singh Chadha (22 October 1960 – 17 November 2012), also known as Ponty Chadha, was an Indian industrialist and philanthropist who owned the Wave Group. Chadha was noted for his success in the alcohol industry, particularly for having alcohol distribution monopolies in Punjab and Uttar Pradesh, and for his political influence.

== Early life ==
Gurdeep "Ponty" Singh Chadha was born on 22 October 1960, Moradabad, Uttar Pradesh, India. During the Partition of India in 1947, Chadha's father, Kulwant Singh Chadha, migrated from what subsequently became Pakistan. Chadha had two younger brothers, Rajinder and Hardeep. As a child, Chadha would help his father sell snacks in front of a country liquor shop. In 1968, Kulwant, later started a small jaggery mill, where Chadha and his siblings worked as well.

== Business career ==
Noted as a wealthy and powerful businessman, Chadha's business interests were in liquor, real estate, multiplexes, malls and film production. Initially in his career, he started and grew his liquor business. Chadha himself stated that he later diversified into other industries to rehabilitate the negative reputation he had gained from his liquor business. His business interests were jointly owned with his brothers, Raju and Hardeep; however, Chadha was noted as the founder and overall head of the family's businesses.

=== Liquor ===
Chadha gained a strong presence Uttar Pradesh's liquor industry in 2007, when he began expanding his father's wholesale liquor business. By 2009, Chadha's liquor business gained a monopoly, first in wholesale trade and then in retail, in Uttar Pradesh. He was granted wholesale liquor distribution rights by the then Bahujan Samaj Party government in Uttar Pradesh in 2009, which was the first ever time that an individual business was given full control of liquor distribution in a state. Chadha also gained a liquor distribution monopoly in Punjab, and due to his political influence across multiple political parties, he managed to maintain this monopoly under successive state governments. Besides India, Chadha's distribution network covered Nepal, Bhutan, United States, UK and several other Arabian and Asian countries.

=== Real estate ===
Wave Infratech is the real estate arm of the Chadha Group. Starting off with commercial and residential projects and malls in Noida, the group expanded to Punjab, Gurgaon, and other parts of North India. It tied up with IBM to build India's first smart city, Wave City, Ghaziabad. Other ventures include Wave One, Wave Cinemas, Wave Malls, Wave City, Wave Estate, and Wave City Center. Chadha group also enjoyed a hold over the mining business in Bundelkhand and Sonbhadra regions of Uttar Pradesh.

=== Other businesses ===
Chadha's Wave Group was also involved in financing and distributing Bollywood movies, and he acquired two teams in an Indian hockey league.

=== Assets investigation controversy ===
In 2012, it was reported that cash worth Rs 11 crore, jewellery and fixed deposits were recovered from Chadha's properties, and 13 of his bank lockers confiscated. However, various media reports were contradictory. About two weeks later, they reported that almost nothing was recovered. However, there were questions raised over the perfectly timed incidents just before the 2012 Uttar Pradesh Legislative Assembly elections and how the worth of seized assets was so precisely quoted within a few hours of the raid.

== Philanthropy ==
Ponty established Mata Bhagwanti Chadha Niketan in July 1999, a non-profit special education institution in Noida with the mission to educate and prepare special children to achieve physical, social and financial independence to the best of their abilities, in honor of his right-hand man Niketan Sawhney being shot and killed in a standoff with a rival business group in December 1997.

The school aims at total self-reliance and its curriculum is specifically tailored for that. Alongside academic learning, it trains children on art and handicraft for all-round development. Dedicated outlets at Wave Malls further promote the merchandise produced in-house by the children.

== Personal life ==
Chadha was married to Jatinder Kaur Chadha and had two children: Manpreet "Monty" Singh Chadha and Harsheen Chadha. His niece, Tanya Chadha, the daughter of his brother Raju, married Adhiraj Khanna, the son of politician and businessman Arvind Khanna.

== Death ==
Ponty Chadha, died on 17 November 2012 and his death remains mired in mystery. The cause of the death is said to be crossfire between him and brother Hardeep, though varied accounts of the incident can be found. One of the arguments is that disputed ownership over a piece of property led to the crossfire; speculations in the media of the brothers being in loggerheads over the family business were also rife, but all these have remained largely unconfirmed in the public domain.

Moreover, sources debating the incident, including Taranjit Singh, who is claimed to be a close family relative, confirm that Ponty was handicapped in both hands and could not possibly have fired at his brother. It was also later established when during the investigations it came out that Hardeep had initiated the crossfire. In January 2014, murder charges against all the 21 accused were dropped by a trial court in Delhi, including Sukhdev Singh Namdhari, ex-chairman of Uttarakhand's minority commission who was arrested on 23 November for shooting at Hardeep Chadha.

However, charges of culpable homicide not amounting to murder were invoked against Namdhari and his Personal Security Officer, Sachin Tyagi while the 19 other accused were charged with attempt to murder. The Delhi Police, in July 2014, contested the ruling in the Delhi High Court which accepted the plea and served fresh notices to the 21 accused. During its investigations, Delhi Police also discovered that armed PSOs (Personal Security Officers) commissioned with the Punjab Police were accompanying the Chadha brothers beyond their jurisdiction. An intervention from the Home Ministry has been sought as to why Delhi Police was not intimated.

Chadha's business interests were divided between his son, Monty, and his brother, Raju. Approximately 64% of Chadha's business interests, comprising real estate and sugar mills, went to his son Monty, while approximately 36%, comprising liquor and film distribution, went to his brother Raju.
