= Shyam Park metro station =

Metro station in Uttar Pradesh, India

Shyam Park

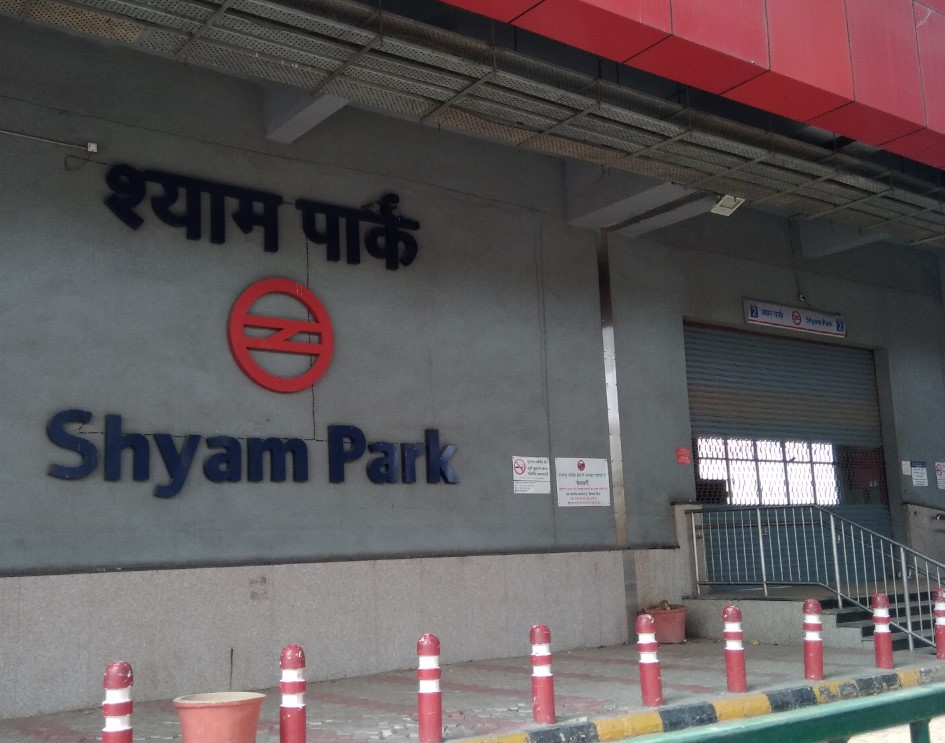

General information
- Location: GT Road, Shyam Park, Ghaziabad, Uttar Pradesh
- Coordinates: 28°40′42″N 77°22′15″E
- System: Delhi Metro station
- Owner: Delhi Metro Rail Corporation
- Line: Red Line
- Platforms: Side platform Platform-1 → Rithala; Platform-2 → Shaheed Sthal (New Bus Adda)
- Tracks: 2

Construction
- Structure type: Elevated
- Platform levels: 2
- Accessible: Yes

Other information
- Station code: SMPK

History
- Opened: 8 March 2019
- Electrified: 25 kV 50 Hz AC through overhead catenary

Services
| Preceding station | Delhi Metro | Following station |
|---|---|---|
| Major Mohit Sharma Rajendra Nagar towards Rithala | Red Line | Mohan Nagar towards Shaheed Sthal (New Bus Adda) |
Route map
Location

Shyam Park is an elevated metro station on the Red Line of the Delhi Metro, located in Ghaziabad, Uttar Pradesh. It is situated along the Sahibabad Industrial Area section of the Dilshad Garden–Shaheed Sthal corridor.

== Station layout ==
| L2 | Side platform | Doors will open on the left |
| L2 | Platform 2 Eastbound | Towards → Shaheed Sthal (New Bus Adda); Next Station: Mohan Nagar |
| L2 | Platform 1 Westbound | Towards ← Rithala; Next Station: Major Mohit Sharma Rajendra Nagar |
| L2 | Side platform | Doors will open on the left |
| L1 | Concourse | Fare control, station agent, Metro Card vending machines, crossover |
| G | Street Level | Exit/Entrance |

== See also ==
- List of Delhi Metro stations
- Transport in Delhi
- Delhi Metro Rail Corporation
- Delhi Suburban Railway
- List of rapid transit systems in India
- Delhi Transport Corporation
- List of Metro Systems
- National Capital Region (India)
- Ghaziabad district, Uttar Pradesh
