= Sukhdev Singh Namdhari =

Indian mining baron

- Born: October 15, 1965 (age 60); Talli, Bajpur, Uttarakhand, India
- Education: Bajpur Inter College
- Occupation: Former Minorities Commission Chairman U. K.
- Spouse: Harjinder Kaur

Sukhdev Singh Namdhari is the ex-chairman of Uttarakhand Minority Commission (March 2010 – November 2012), an alleged mining baron, and a politically influential figure. He stepped into politics as a small-time BJP leader, and in due time, became a well-connected political figure. He was also the State President of Rashtriya Sikh Sangat, a sister organization of the Rashtriya Swayamsevak Sangh.

He made news as the main accused in the murder mystery of famous industrialist brothers, Ponty and Hardeep Chaddha. Following the accusation and his alleged involvement, Namdhari was expelled from the BJP and removed from his post of the Minority Commission chief.

== Early life and education ==
Born and brought up in village Talli in the city of Bajpur, Namdhari was the son of a farmer, Roor Singh. He gained early fascination for power and guns and adopted the alias ‘Fauji’, which quickly gained popularity amid his childhood mates. He schooled at the Bazpur Inter College, from where he dropped out in 1985 in 12th standard, and took to truck driving instead.

His father bought him his first truck in 1987, which according to former associates, he used for smuggling illicitly fell ‘Khair’ trees. Later, he made his much coveted entry into politics through his association with Deendayal Singh Bhullar, the former Bazpur block pramukh, and gradually rose in stature. Soon after, he became the personal bodyguard of Harbhajan Singh Cheema, MLA Kashipur. However, it was only during the family feud between Cheema, Bhullar, and local don Gurbachan Lal Sharma that Namdhari rose to prominence. Namdhari’s role in the feud raised suspicion but charges remained unconfirmed.

== Controversies ==
He is allegedly the main accused in the 17 November 2012 shootout that led to the death of industrialist Ponty Chadha, and his younger brother, Hardeep, at their South Delhi farmhouse.

Namdhari was arrested from Bazpur in Uttarakhand and was brought to Delhi for further investigation. Namdhari’s personal Security Officer (PSO) Sachin Tyagi’s name also came up during the course of the investigations. Tyagi in touch with Namdhari since January 2012 and during the course of the investigations the shootout alluded to being a ‘well-hatched conspiracy.’ Tyagi was arrested on 3 December 2012. He was also found in illegal possession of a (.30) caliber pistol, which he said was given to him by Namdhari. He later confessed that he fired at Hardeep with his official weapon. The case still remains under trial. Namdhari and Sachin Tyagi were cleared of the IPC 302 and murder charges were dropped and are being tried for IPC 304 which is culpable homicide not amounting to murder. The shooting was not premeditated and no conspiracy was found.
