= Vijay Inder Singla =

Indian politician

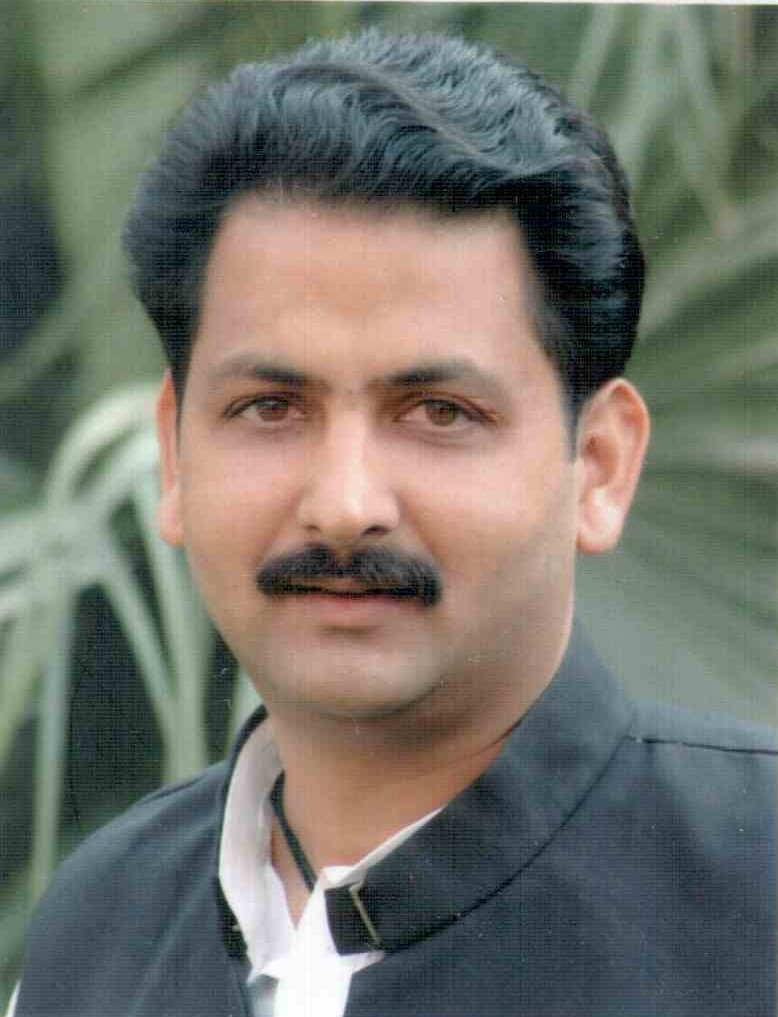

Minister of Public Works Department and Administrative Reforms, Punjab
- In office 21 April 2018 – 10 March 2022
- Preceded by: Janmeja Sekhon
- Succeeded by: Harbhajan Singh

Member of the Punjab Legislative Assembly
- In office 11 March 2017 – 10 March 2022
- Preceded by: Parkash Chand Garg
- Succeeded by: Narinder Kaur Bharaj
- Constituency: Sangrur

Member of Parliament, Lok Sabha
- In office 13 May 2009–16 May 2014
- Preceded by: Sukhdev Dhindsa
- Succeeded by: Bhagwant Mann
- Constituency: Sangrur

Personal details
- Born: 1 December 1971 (age 54) Ludhiana, Punjab, India
- Party: Indian National Congress
- Spouse: Deepa Singla
- Children: 2
- Parent: Sant Ram Singla
- Education: B.M.S. Institute of Technology and Management (BE)
- Occupation: Politician, engineer
- Website: Official website

Vijay Inder Singla (born 1 December 1971) is an Indian politician from Punjab. He is a prominent member of the Indian National Congress, a former Member of Parliament. He represented the Sangrur Lok Sabha constituency from 2009 to 2014, and later served as a Member of the Punjab Legislative Assembly for the Sangrur constituency from 2017 to 2022.

During his time in the state assembly, he served as a cabinet minister heading the Public Works Department (PWD) and Administrative Reforms. He has also held key organizational roles nationally, including serving as a national spokesperson and an All India Congress Committee (AICC) secretary.

== Early life and education ==
Vijay Inder Singla did his matriculation from Yadavindra Public School, Patiala in 1987 and intermediate from Multani Mal Modi College, Patiala in 1989. He has a Bachelor of Engineering degree in (Computer Science) from B.M.S. College of Engineering, Bangalore, Karnataka.

== Political career ==
=== Youth Politics ===
His political career began with Punjab Youth Congress as general secretary from 2002 - 2004 and vice-president later. On his father's death he was appointed chairman of Punjab Energy Development Authority in 2005 by the Chief Minister of Punjab Amarinder Singh. He was President of Punjab Youth Congress from 2006 to 2008 and was assigned the task of conducting the first Youth Congress elections in Punjab as a pilot project which was thereafter replicated throughout India. He was made Member of Indian Youth Congress Election Commission (2010-2012) which was responsible for conducting Youth Congress elections in India to identify fresh grassroot talent, known to be a close confidant of Rahul Gandhi brigade.

=== Parliament ===
In 2009 he was elected to Lok Sabha from Sangrur Lok Sabha by defeating Sukhdev Singh Dhindsa from Shiromani Akali Dal by a margin of more than 40000 votes. Vijay Inder Singla in his first term as MP is credited with bringing major development projects to this backward region including a 300-bed PGI Sangrur Hospital with an outlay of Rs 449 crore which will change the profile of the constituency with specialized medical treatment, more jobs and better business opportunities. The project has been delayed and heavily criticized by the opposition SAD. Moreover, his efforts in providing greater rail and road connectivity are appreciable like starting of Shatabdi Express from Sangrur, Panj Takht Yatra train, new trains to Sirsa, Ajmer, Jammu etc., rail track electrification and railway overbridges to ease traffic congestion. Although, these trains were one time affair, people still are happy with his efforts. He brought projects in the Sports field like Synthetic Athletic Track at Sangrur and SAI sports coaching centre at Barnala, undertook extensive rural development works from MPLAD fund in the fields of education, health, community development, sports and public utilities. He represented India at the 64th session of UN General Assembly in New York City in November 2013 and spoke on Palestine refugee issue. He is a Member of Indian Council of World Affairs, National Platform for Disaster Risk Reduction, Institute & Governing Body of Post Graduate Institute of Medical Education & Research (Chandigarh), Regional Direct Taxes Advisory Committee, Patiala (Punjab) and Chairman of Regional Consultative Committee on Food Corporation of India (Punjab) and has been pursuing the cause of stakeholders through these forums and bodies.

In 2014 he lost Lok Sabha election from Sangrur constituency. Bhagwant Mann defeated him with a hefty margin of 3,51,827 votes.

== Electoral performance ==
=== Parliament: Lok Sabha ===
General Election 2014: Sangrur
Party	Candidate	Votes	%	±%
AAP	Bhagwant Mann	533,237	48.47	▲48.47
SAD	Sukhdev Singh Dhindsa	321,516	29.23	▼4.90
INC	Vijay Inder Singla	181,410	17.50	▼21.02
BSP	Madan Bhatti	8,408	0.76	
CPI	Sukhdev Ram Sharma	6,934	0.63	
Majority		211,721	19.24	▲14.85
Turnout		1,100,056	77.21	
AAP gain from INC		Swing	▲34.75	

=== Punjab Assembly ===
2017 Punjab Legislative Assembly election: Sangrur
Party	Candidate	Votes	%	±%
INC	Vijay Inder Singla	67,310	47.4%	+8.52
AAP	Dinesh Bansal	36,498	25.7%	New
SAD	Parkash Chand Garg	34,510	24.3%	−18.29
NOTA	None of the above	768	0.54%	
Majority		30,812		
Turnout		142,781	80.61%	+0.25
Registered electors				
INC gain from SAD		Swing	+8.52	

2022 Punjab Legislative Assembly election: Sangrur
Party	Candidate	Votes	%	±%
AAP	Narinder Kaur Bharaj	74,851	51.67	+25.97
INC	Vijay Inder Singla	38,421	26.52	−20.88
BJP	Arvind Khanna	13,766	9.5	New entry
SAD	Winnerjit Singh Goldy	10,488	7.24	−17.06
SAD(A)	Gurnaib Singh	4,466	3.08	−1.77
SSP	Jagdeep Singh Mintu Toor	1,209	0.83	New
Majority		36,430	25.15	
Turnout		144,873	76.31	−4.3
Registered electors		189,838		
AAP gain from INC				

2024 Indian general election: Anandpur Sahib
Party	Candidate	Votes	%	±%
AAP	Malwinder Singh Kang	313,217	29.08	▲24.18
INC	Vijay Inder Singla	302,371	28.07	▼11.5
BJP	Subhash Sharma	186,578	17.32	New entry
SAD	Prem Singh Chandumajra	117,936	10.95	▼24.29
BSP	Jasvir Singh Garhi	90,157	8.37	▼5.17
SAD(A)	Khushalpal Singh Mann	24,831	2.31	New
NOTA	None of the Above	6,402	0.59	▼0.99
Majority		10,846	1.01	▼1.15
Turnout		1,077,123		
AAP gain from INC		Swing	▲24.18	
