= Kabir Waraich =

Indian racing driver

- Nationality: Indian
- Born: Sangrur, Punjab
- Years active: 2008 – present

Kabir Waraich is an Indian racing driver. He has won Ultimate Desert Challenge Bikaner three consecutive times.

== Background ==
Waraich hails from Sangrur, Punjab. He completed his schooling from his hometown and graduation from Chandigarh. Waraich started his racing career in 2008. He is the first Indian to participate in Rain Forest Malaysia. He finished 3rd overall in 2014 & 2015 RFC India. He has won Ultimate Dessert Challenge Bikaner 3 times consecutively. He is also the founder of The Gerrari Offroaders.

== Career ==
=== 2011 ===
- 1st in Patiala Speed Fest - (PB) Off-road 4x4
- 1st in OYA (Mohali) - Autocross Off-road 4x4

=== 2012 ===
- 1st in Uncaged Summer Challenge (Derabassi)
- 1st in Uncaged Winter Challenge (Derabassi)
- Finalist in Mahindra Offroad Trophy

=== 2013 ===
- 4th in Mahindra Offroad Trophy (MH)
- 2nd in Aravali Offroad Challenge (Aravali)
- Selected for Pallar Challenge (Chennai)
- Selected for Mahindra (Ggn) Offroad Trophy
- 1st in OYA Offroad Challenge (Mohali)
- 1st in Uncaged (Derabassi)

=== 2014 ===
- 3rd in RFC 2014 (Goa)
- 1st OYA Offroad Challenge
- 5th in Mahindra Offroad Challenge (Mh)
- Official Desert Storm

=== 2015 ===
- 3rd in RFC (Goa)
- 1st in Polaris Offroad
- 1st in Mahindra Escape (Chd) Official Desert Storm
- 1st in OYA Autocross
- Judge in EVO offroad Magazine

=== 2016 ===
- 6 Fastest Stages in Royal Rajasthan Rally
- 1st in The Uitimate Desert Challenge (UDO)
- 2nd Orange JK4x4 fury- DAMBUK
- 2nd in Club Challenge

=== 2017 ===
- 1st in The Ultimate Desert Challenge (UDC)
- 1st in JK4x4 fury -DAMBUK

=== 2018 ===
- 1st in JK Tyre 4 play (kikar) Ropar
- 2nd in Dirt Drif (Auto cross)
- 1st in Dirt Drif (Offroad)
- 2nd in Orange JK 4x4 fury- DAMBUK

=== 2019 ===
- 1st in UDC (Hat Trick)
- 1st in OYA Autocross
- 1st in OYA Offroad
- 1st in SlushX

=== 2020 ===
- 1st position in 9th OYA Autocross, Motocross and Offroading challenge
