= Ranjit Singh Balian =

Indian politician

Cabinet Minister, Government of Punjab
- In office 1999 - 2002

MLA, Punjab
- In office 1985 - 1987
- Preceded by: Sukhdev Singh Dhindsa
- Succeeded by: Jasbir Singh
- Constituency: Sangrur
- In office 1997 - 2002
- Preceded by: Jasbir Singh
- Succeeded by: Arvind Khanna
- Constituency: Sangrur

Personal details
- Party: Shiromani Akali Dal

Ranjit Singh Balian was an Indian politician, and a member of Shiromani Akali Dal. He served as Cabinet Minister in Punjab, and MLA twice from Sangrur. Balian died on 16 February 2016 in Mohali, at age of 61.
