= PGIMER Satellite Centre Sangrur =

Geography
- Location: Ghabdan village, Sangrur, (Malwa), Punjab, India
- Coordinates: 30.257634°N 75.9580833°E

Organisation
- Care system: Public
- Affiliated university: PGI Chandigarh
- Patron: Minister for Health and Family Welfare

Services
- Beds: 300

History
- Construction started: 2013
- Founded: 2016

Links
- Website: pgimer.edu.in
- Lists: Hospitals in India

Postgraduate Institute of Medical Education and Research Satellite Centre Sangrur (PGIMER Satellite Centre Sangrur) is a hospital based in Sangrur, Punjab, India.

== History ==
In 2013, Health Minister Ghulam Nabi Azad laid foundation stone of 25 acres and 300-bed PGIMER Satellite Centre Sangrur in Ghabdan village of Sangrur district.

== Facilities ==
Inaugurated in 2016, OPD services are available from 9.00 am till 2.00 pm (Monday to Saturday) at PGIMER Satellite Centre Sangrur for OPD facilities in Internal Medicine, Family Medicine, Community Medicine, Pediatrics, Radiotherapy, Psychiatry, General Surgery, Obstetrics and gynaecology, Ophthalmology (Eye), ENT, Orthopedics, and Dental. Department of Radiotherapy and Oncology has started chemotherapy services here, especially for Breast cancer patients. Medical Diagnostic facilities of X-ray and ECG and laboratory services in Biochemistry, Hematology and Microbiology are also available. Till mid-2024, there were total 16 permanent faculty working here. But, due poor local administration, 4 regular faculties has either resigned or shifted to Chandigarh.
