= Arvind Khanna =

Indian politician, businessman, investor and philanthropist

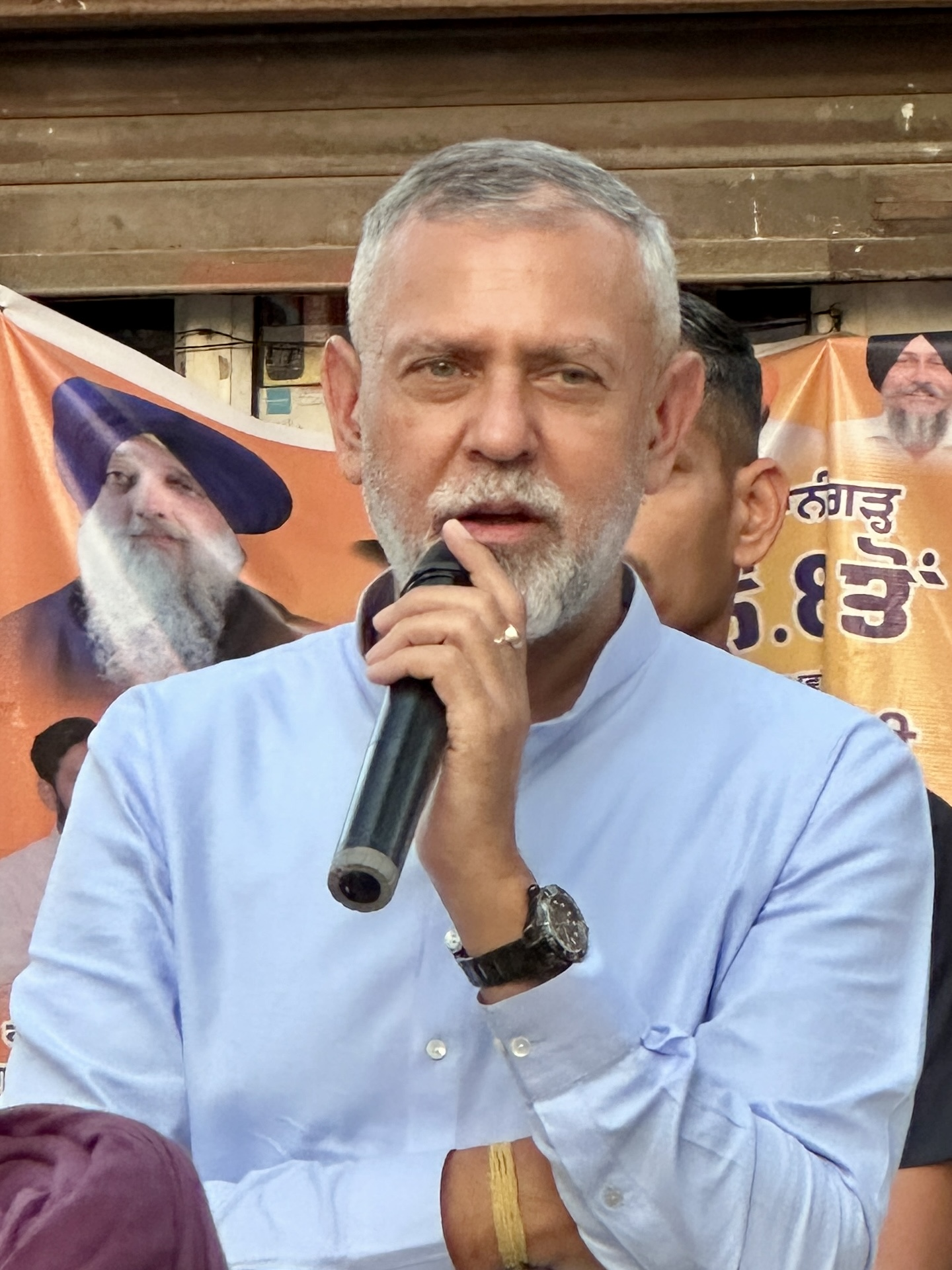
- Khanna in 2026

Vice-President of Bharatiya Janata Party, Punjab
- In office 3 December 2022 – 15 February 2026
- President: Ashwani Kumar Sharma; Sunil Kumar Jakhar

Member of the Punjab Legislative Assembly
- In office 2002–2007
- Preceded by: Ranjit Singh
- Succeeded by: Surinder Pal Singh Sibia
- Constituency: Sangrur
- In office 2012–2015
- Preceded by: Iqbal Singh Jhundan
- Succeeded by: Gobind Singh Longowal
- Constituency: Dhuri

Personal details
- Born: 29 May 1967 (age 59) Delhi, India
- Party: Shiromani Akali Dal (1997; 2026-present)
- Other political affiliations: Bharatiya Janata Party (2022-2026); Indian National Congress (1998-2015)
- Spouse: Shagun Khanna
- Children: 2
- Parent(s): Vipin Khanna (father); Naginder Khanna (mother)
- Education: Millfield
- Alma mater: Pepperdine University
- Occupation: Politician; businessman; investor; philanthropist
- Website: Official website

Arvind Khanna (born 29 May 1967) is an Indian politician, businessman, investor and philanthropist. Khanna has been member of the Shiromani Akali Dal since 2026. He served as vice-president of the BJP from December 2022 to February 2026. He served as the Member of the Legislative Assembly (MLA) from Sangrur from 2002 to 2007 and the MLA from Dhuri from 2012 to 2014. From 1998 to 2015, Khanna was a member of the Indian National Congress (INC). While in the INC, Khanna served in various positions including as General Secretary of the Punjab Pradesh Congress Committee (PPCC) and was a member of the All India Congress Committee. Politically, Khanna has been described as a figure of popular legitimacy and emotional appeal in Punjab.

Khanna, the son of businessman and financier Vipin Khanna, had business interests that spanned several industries, most notably in the arms and aerospace industries. In 2001, Khanna became one of the first individuals to found a private-sector defence manufacturing company in India. According to allegations by Indian government authorities, Khanna was a central figure in the defence industry of India and reportedly exerted control over arms procurement. However, the allegations against him were never proven, and the investigations into Khanna found no evidence of wrongdoing and were dropped. Noted as an industrialist, in 2022, Khanna ended all involvement in his business interests due to his return to politics.

In 1997, Khanna founded the Umeed Foundation, one of the largest non-governmental organisations (NGOs) in Punjab. He has also held positions in sports administration, including serving as the president of the Professional Golfers Association of India.

== Early life and background ==
Arvind Khanna was born on 29 May 1967 in Delhi, India. Khanna is the second son and third child of industrialist and financier Vipin Khanna and Naginder Khanna, the daughter of Maharaja Bhupinder Singh of Patiala. His mother, Naginder, also a member of the Phulkian dynasty, held the title of princess until princely titles were abolished by the 26th Amendment to the Constitution of India in 1971. Born into a Punjabi family, Khanna's siblings are Vinita, Navin and Aditya. His sister, Vinita, was married to Randhir Singh, a sports administrator. Members of Khanna’s family and his family relatives have been involved in various fields and networks, including business, finance, politics, bureaucracy, diplomacy, sports administration, Freemasonry, the military, and philanthropy.

=== Education and golf ===
Khanna attended school at Millfield in Somerset, England. He then attended college at Pepperdien University in California, from where he graduated in 1989 with a degree in business management. During his time in university, Khanna lived in Beverly Hills, California.

He has been a junior champion golfer in India, and has also played golf for Millfield, Pepperdine University and the Indian national men's team. In 1984, Khanna was the world's 5th ranked junior golfer, with a golf handicap of 4. He also took golf lessons from professional golfer Rick Graves in California in 1984. At the age of 17, in 1985, while attending Millfield, he had a handicap of zero.

== Political career ==
Khanna was introduced to politics by Sukhbir Singh Badal, his close friend, and joined the Shiromani Akali Dal in 1997. After joining the party, he became the General Secretary of the Shiromani Akali Dal's youth wing.

=== Indian National Congress ===
In 1998, Khanna joined the Indian National Congress (INC) and served as the Punjab Pradesh Congress Committee (PPCC) party treasurer. He also served as the President of the Punjab Youth Congress. Khanna has been elected twice as a Member of the Legislative Assembly (MLA). In the 2002 Punjab Legislative Assembly election, Khanna contested from Sangrur and secured 42,339 votes (44.2%), winning by a margin of 19,132 votes. In the 2004 Indian general election, he contested from the Sangrur Lok Sabha constituency, and lost in a closely contested election against Sukhdev Singh Dhindsa. In the 2012 Punjab Legislative Assembly election, he won from Dhuri by securing 51,536 votes (45.65%). Khanna served as the General Secretary of the PPCC. He was also a member of the All India Congress Committee.

Khanna wielded significant influence in the PPCC because of his personal fortune and his relationship with Amarinder Singh, former Chief Minister of Punjab. Khanna and Singh are first cousins, being related through Khanna's mother, Naginder, who was Singh's paternal aunt and the sister of Yadavindra Singh, the last Maharaja of Patiala. During his time in the INC, Khanna was reported to be Singh's second-in-command and controlled access to Singh's office. Khanna gained control over the PPCC's political strategy by using his personal fortune to fund Singh's office during his second term as PPCC President, and hiring managers to monitor, coordinate and schedule Singh's meetings. Khanna would also regularly provide his private airplane and helicopter for Singh's use. In his visits to Chandigarh, Singh would stay in Khanna's house in Sector 10.

In May 2014, he resigned as an MLA, and left the INC in 2015. Khanna stated that his reasons for leaving politics were to focus on his businesses and spend time with his family. It was also reported that he was discontent with the Punjab Congress and its leadership, which Khanna himself stated to be true. During his time in the PPCC, Khanna was the party's main financial benefactor.

=== Bharatiya Janata Party ===
In January 2022, Khanna reentered politics and joined the Bharatiya Janata Party (BJP) in the presence of Union Cabinet Ministers, Gajendra Singh Shekhawat and Hardeep Singh Puri. During his time in the party, Khanna was reported to be a senior leader of the BJP. He contested from Sangrur in the 2022 Punjab Legislative Assembly election and lost to Narinder Kaur Bharaj of the Aam Aadmi Party (AAP). In December 2022, Khanna was appointed as vice-president of BJP Punjab. He was also appointed to BJP Punjab's newly formed finance committee. In November 2023, he was appointed to BJP Punjab's core committee. In March 2024, Khanna and Sunil Jakhar, President of BJP Punjab at the time, were the only senior BJP leaders who attended the gathering in Badal for the first death anniversary of former Punjab Chief Minister Parkash Singh Badal. On 14 April 2024, the Punjab Police detained 40 farmers that had gathered to protest Khanna's visit to Malerkotla. The farmers were later released by Punjab Police on the same day. In the 2024 Indian general election, Khanna contested, unsuccessfully, from the Sangrur Lok Sabha constituency and lost to Meet Hayer of AAP.

=== Return to the Shiromani Akali Dal ===
In February 2026, Khanna rejoined the SAD.

== Business career ==
In 1991, Khanna came back to Delhi and joined his family businesses. His business interests spanned various industries, including the arms, aerospace, technology, software and telecommunications equipment industries. In 2001, Khanna founded TSL Defence Technologies, which was one of the first private sector defence companies in India. TSL Defence Technologies was also one of the first 9 Indian private sector companies to receive a defence manufacturing license. The company manufactured simulators, simulator accessories, electronic warfare equipment and airborne radars. In the early 2000s, Khanna was also a director of Clan Morgan Holdings, a company founded by his father, Vipin, in 1997, which had a joint venture with Allied Domecq for manufacturing Teacher's and other Scotch whiskies, in India.

In 2008, Khanna founded ASAS Investments. The company made strategic investments in startups and other private businesses that required capital or access to networks in India and internationally. Through various companies that Khanna owned, he was a shareholder in Indian defence companies Defsys Solutions from 2012 to 2015, Defsys Technical Services from 2015 to 2016 and Realism Technologies from 2015 to 2016, which had offset agreements with foreign defence and aerospace original equipment manufacturers.

Other companies Khanna had founded include Root Invest and Tiger Corporation. From 1997 to 2006, Tiger Sports Marketing, a Tiger Corporation joint venture with Asia Sports Group, managed the commercial rights of the Indian Golf Tour. In 2006, Tiger Sports Marketing set up, managed and marketed the first Professional Golf Tour of India. Khanna, along with his brother Aditya, was also one of the co-owners of Punjab Kings, an Indian Premier League cricket team founded in 2008 as King XI Punjab.

Khanna also had investments in the real estate and hospitality industries. In 2006, Khanna, through one of his investment companies, and businessman Gursamarjit Singh invested in a company that developed a hotel in Delhi, and the company was sold in 2012. Singh's office also managed Khanna's real estate investments portfolio; however, according to an Indian business registry, the last business interaction between Singh and Khanna took place in 2018. Singh, a real estate businessman based in the UK, was a donor to the Conservative Party and was seen with former British prime ministers Theresa May and Boris Johnson. In 2020, Singh posted a birthday message for Khanna on the social media platform Instagram, referring to Khanna as the capo dei capi (a term which translates to boss of bosses in Italian), however, Singh's lawyers stated that the comment was a private joke between friends. Singh's lawyers in India also stated that Khanna and Singh have no business relationships, and that Khanna is a personal friend amongst Singh's other personal friends. In 2022, Khanna ended his involvement in all business activities due to reentering politics.

== Business controversies ==
Khanna's father, Vipin, was allegedly one of the largest and most powerful arms dealers in India according to claims by the Indian government and Indian investigative agencies. In his business career, Khanna was reportedly a key figure in the Indian defence industry, allegedly exerting control over the approval of arms procurement in India, according to claims by Indian government agencies. Khanna was investigated and accused in several arms deals. However, the investigations into Khanna never proved any wrongdoing.

In 2000, the Indian Navy had placed a purchase order for seven Barak anti-missile defence systems and Barak missiles, from Israel Aerospace Industries (IAI). In 2007, Khanna and his family were accused by the Central Bureau of Investigation (CBI) of having influenced the deal in favour of IAI, receiving kickbacks from the company, and it was also suspected that companies owned by Khanna and his family had received substantial payments from IAI. The case against Khanna and his family was dropped due to lack of evidence.

In 2003, Denel had received an order by the Indian Army to supply bunker buster anti-material rifles. In 2005, Khanna and his family were accused for allegedly facilitating the deal. The CBI suspected Khanna and his family of receiving in commissions for securing the contract in Denel's favor, and to influence the Ministry of Defence's Price Negotiation Committee. However, Khanna and his family denied any involvement in the Denel deal, and the CBI dropped the case due to lack of evidence.

In 2009, Israel Military Industries (IMI) was awarded a contract by the Ordnance Factory Board (OFB) to build a factory to produce artillery charges. The CBI accused Khanna's company, TSL Defence Technologies, and its employees of influencing the contract selection on behalf of IMI with senior members of the OFB. The Delhi High Court later acquitted Khanna and his company, and gave them a clean chit. In addition to this, the Delhi High Court also levied a fine on the Ministry of Defence for falsely implicating Khanna's company in the case.

From 2012 to 2016, Khanna, through various companies he owned, was a shareholder of Defsys Solutions, a company linked to allegations of corruption related to its influence on and facilitation of India's procurement of the Dassault Rafale multirole combat aircraft for the Indian Air Force. However, neither Khanna nor any of the other shareholders of Defsys Solutions were investigated in relation to allegations of corruption in the Dassault Rafale procurement.

In 2016 and 2019, it was alleged that Khanna was collaborating with Rafael Advanced Defense Systems, an Israeli defence company, on missile systems projects in India.

== Philanthropy ==
In 1997, Khanna founded the Umeed Foundation, a non-governmental organisation (NGO), in Sangrur. The Umeed (which translates to hope in Hindi) Foundation is one of Punjab's largest NGOs. The NGO has also been supported by various organizations that include the Council of People's Action and Rural Technology (CAPART), Medanta, Cipla, the Australian High Commission in India and the Government of Japan. In 2008, the Umeed Foundation collaborated with the Bharti Airtel Foundation and laid the foundation stone of the Satya Bharti School in Sangrur. The foundation stone was laid by Khanna's mother, Naginder. In 2012, the Umeed Foundation participated in the New York International Gift Fair and displayed products made by underprivileged women from rural Punjab under the NGO's social and economic empowerment initiatives.

After restarting its services in 2023, the Umeed Foundation has focused on providing healthcare, employment, and education for underprivileged people in rural Punjab. The NGO has also helped form women's self help groups in villages which receive employment training.

== Sports and sports administration ==
Khanna has competed in golf tournaments in India and had served as the president of the Professional Golfers Association of India (PGI). He also served as the president of the Fencing Association of India and as the Secretary-General of the Punjab Olympic Association. He financially assisted professional golfer Smriti Mehra in the 1990s, when she was competing in tournaments in the United States. Through one of his companies, Khanna also sponsored professional golfer Gaurav Ghei, his friend and playing partner during the 1990s. He is one of the co-owners of Christie's Golf, a Delhi Golf Club League team.

== Personal life and family ==
Khanna is married to Shagun Khanna. Shagun is the granddaughter of sports administrator and politician Bhalindra Singh. Khanna and Shagun have two sons, Adhiraj Khanna and Suryaveer Khanna. Adhiraj married Tanya Chadha, the daughter of industrialist Raju Chadha and niece of liquor industrialist Ponty Chadha, in 2021. Together, Adhiraj and Suryaveer have joint business interests in the defence and aerospace industries, including a joint venture with EM&E Group, a Spanish defence company co-founded by Ángel Escribano, and the brothers also have a joint venture with Arquimea, a Spanish defence, space, and technology company.
