= Parkash Chand Garg =

Indian politician

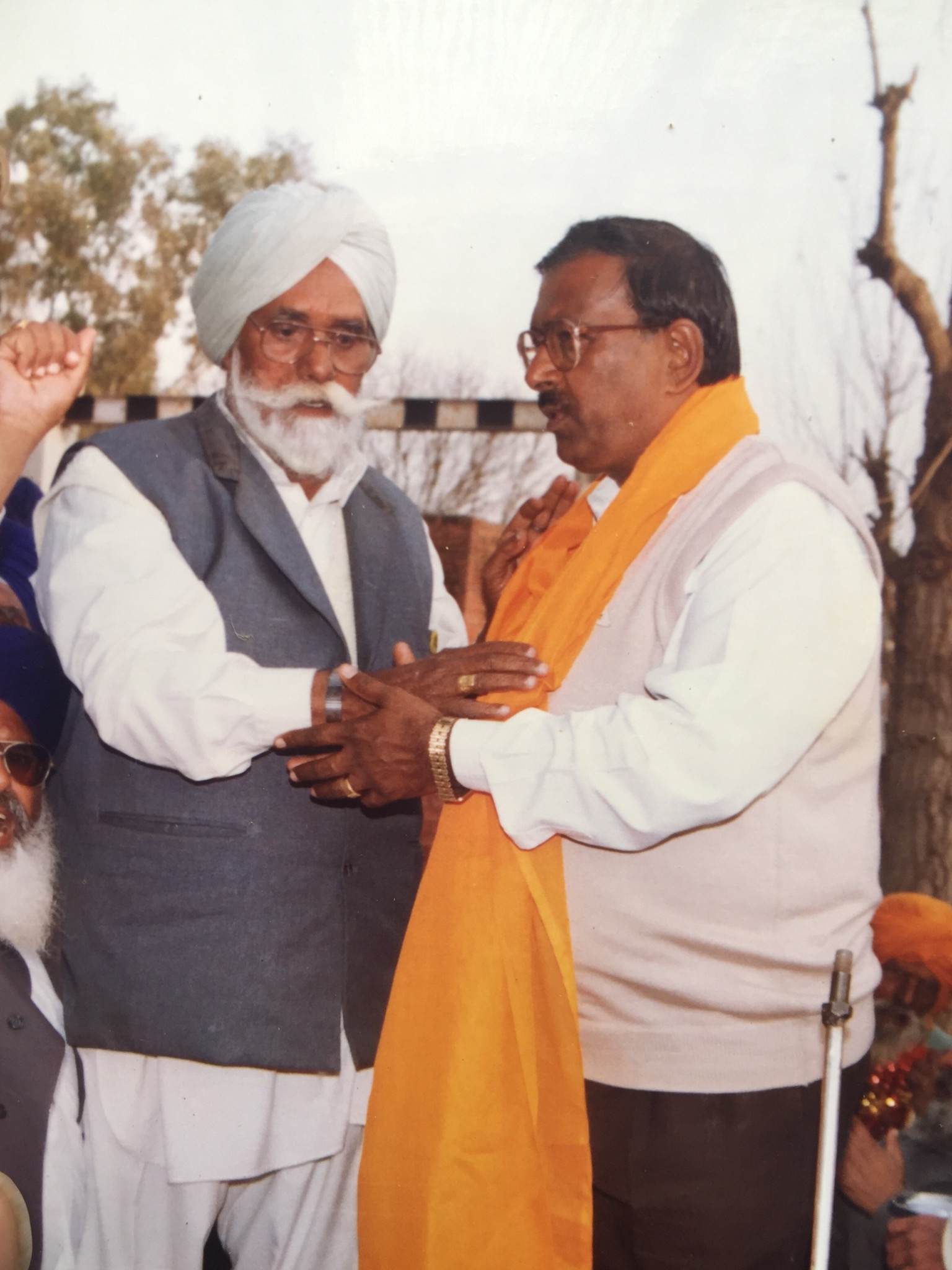
- Garg (in right) with Sardar Naurang Singh Zaildar (in left)

MLA, Punjab
- In office 2012 - 2017
- Preceded by: Surinder Pal Singh Sibia
- Succeeded by: Vijay Inder Singla
- Constituency: Sangrur

Personal details
- Born: 28 August 1952 (age 73) Bhawanigarh
- Party: Shiromani Akali Dal
- Children: one son

Parkash Chand Garg is an Indian politician and a member of Shiromani Akali Dal. He served as MLA of Sangrur from 2012 to 2017 and was succeeded by Vijay Inder Singla of INC. In 2007, he lost to Congress candidate Surinder Pal Singh Sibia by 12,010 votes. In 2012, he defeated Sibia by 4,645 votes. In 2017, he lost to Vijay Inder Singla.

== Electoral Performance ==
=== Punjab Assembly ===
2022 Punjab Legislative Assembly election : Dhuri
Party	Candidate	Votes	%	±%
AAP	Bhagwant Mann	82,592	64.29	
INC	Dalvir Singh Goldy	24,386	18.98	
SAD	Parkash Chand Garg	6,991	5.44	
BJP	Randeep Singh Deol	5,436	4.23	
SAD(A)	Narinder Singh	4,469	3.48	
SSM	Sarbjit Singh Alal	1,188	0.92	
NOTA	None of the Above	775	0.6	
Margin of victory		58,206	45.4	
Total valid votes		128,458	77.32	
Rejected ballots		429		
Turnout		128,977	77.63	
Registered electors		166,143		
AAP gain from INC		Swing		
