= Sangrur Assembly constituency =

Constituency of the Punjab legislative assembly in India

Coordinates: 30.24°N 75.84°E

Sangrur
- Constituency No. 108 for the Punjab Legislative Assembly

Constituency details
- Country: India
- State: Punjab
- District: Sangrur
- Lok Sabha constituency: Sangrur
- Established: 1951
- Total electors: 189,838 (2022)
- Reservation: None

Member of Legislative Assembly
- 16th Punjab Legislative Assembly
- Incumbent Narinder Kaur Bharaj
- Party: Aam Aadmi Party
- Elected year: 2022

Location of Sangrur district in Punjab (India)

Sangrur Assembly constituency (Sl. No.: 108) is a Punjab Legislative Assembly constituency in Sangrur district, Punjab state, India. Constituency consists of Sangrur, Bhawanigarh and other nearby villages. Current MLA from constituency is Narinder Kaur Bharaj of the Aam Aadmi Party.

== History ==
Sangrur constituency was formed in 1951.

=== Demographics ===
It is categorized as general and semi-urban constituency. According to the report of the Delimitation Commission, 2008, there is around 28.26% Scheduled Caste population in constituency. A total of 420 square kilometers area and 1,89,838 electors are covered by constituency.

== Members of the Legislative Assembly ==
Most successful parties from Sangrur Vidhan Sabha
1. INC (8 Times) (47.1%)
2. SAD (5 Times) (29.4%)
3. AAP (1 Time) (5.88%)
4. AD – SFS (1 Time) (5.88%)
5. CPI (1 Time) (5.88%)
6. JP (1 Time) (5.88%)

=== Patiala and East Punjab States Union ===
Election	Member	Party
1952	Gajjan Singh	Shiromani Akali Dal
1954	Devinder Singh	Indian National Congress

=== Punjab ===
Members of Legislative Assembly
Election	Member	Picture	Party
1957	Rajinder Singh		Indian National Congress
1962	Hardit Singh		Communist Party of India
1967	J. Singh		Akali Dal – Sant Fateh Singh Group
1969	Gurbaksh Singh		Indian National Congress
1972	Gurbaksh Singh		Indian National Congress
1977	Gurdial Singh		Janata Party
1980	Sukhdev Singh Dhindsa		Shiromani Akali Dal
1985	Ranjit Singh		Shiromani Akali Dal
1992	Jasbir Singh		Indian National Congress
1997	Ranjit Singh		Shiromani Akali Dal
2002	Arvind Khanna		Indian National Congress
2007	Surinder Pal Singh Sibia		Indian National Congress
2012	Parkash Chand Garg		Shiromani Akali Dal
2017	Vijay Inder Singla		Indian National Congress
2022	Narinder Kaur Bharaj		Aam Aadmi Party

== Election results ==
=== 2027 ===
Punjab Assembly election, 2027: Sangrur
Party	Candidate	Votes	%	±%
AAP				
AD (WPD)				New entry
INC				
BSP				
SAD				
BJP				
NOTA	None of the above			
Majority				
Turnout				

=== 2022 ===
2022 Punjab Legislative Assembly election: Sangrur
Party	Candidate	Votes	%	±%
AAP	Narinder Kaur Bharaj	74,851	51.67	+25.97
INC	Vijay Inder Singla	38,421	26.52	−20.88
BJP	Arvind Khanna	13,766	9.5	New entry
SAD	Winnerjit Singh Goldy	10,488	7.24	−17.06
SAD(A)	Gurnaib Singh	4,466	3.08	−1.77
SSP	Jagdeep Singh Mintu Toor	1,209	0.83	New
Majority		36,430	25.15	
Turnout		144,873	76.31	−4.3
Registered electors		189,838		
AAP gain from INC				

=== 2017 ===
2017 Punjab Legislative Assembly election: Sangrur
Party	Candidate	Votes	%	±%
INC	Vijay Inder Singla	67,310	47.4%	+8.52
AAP	Dinesh Bansal	36,498	25.7%	New
SAD	Parkash Chand Garg	34,510	24.3%	−18.29
NOTA	None of the above	768	0.54%	
Majority		30,812		
Turnout		142,781	80.61%	+0.25
Registered electors				
INC gain from SAD		Swing	+8.52	

=== 2012 ===
2012 Punjab Legislative Assembly election: Sangrur
Party	Candidate	Votes	%	±%
SAD	Parkash Chand Garg	53,302	42.59%	
INC	Surinder Pal Singh Sibia	48,657	38.88%	
PPOP	Baldev Singh Mann	17,665	14.11%	
Majority		4,645		
Turnout		125,156	80.36%	

=== 2007 ===
Punjab Legislative Assembly Election, 2007: Sangrur
Party	Candidate	Votes	%	±%
INC	Surinder Pal Singh Sibia	61,171	51.36%	
SAD	Parkash Chand Garg	49,161	41.28%	
BSP	Avtar Singh	4,603	3.86%	
Majority		12,010		
Turnout		119,096		

=== 2002 ===
Punjab Legislative Assembly Election, 2002: Sangrur
Party	Candidate	Votes	%	±%
INC	Arvind Khanna	42,339	44.2%	
Independent	Ranjit Singh Balian	23,203	24.23%	
SAD	Sanmukh Singh	15,630	16.32%	
SAD(A)	Jeet Singh Aloarakh	9,168	9.57%	
Majority		19,132		
Turnout		95,793	65.7%	
