= Surinder Pal Singh Sibia =

Indian politician

MLA, Punjab
- In office 2007 - 2012
- Preceded by: Arvind Khanna
- Succeeded by: Parkash Chand Garg
- Constituency: Sangrur

Personal details
- Party: Indian National Congress
- Other political affiliations: Shiromani Akali Dal (2016-2019)

Surinder Pal Singh Sibia is an Indian politician, and a member of Indian National Congress. He served as MLA of Sangrur from 2007 to 2012. He contested from Sangrur in 1997, 2007, and 2012, while twice (2002 and 2017) from Barnala. Sibia has also served as vice-president of Punjab Pradesh Congress Committee. Sibia joined Shiromani Akali Dal in 2016 ahead of 2017 assembly elections, and contested from Barnala where he was defeated by Meet Hayer. In 2019, he rejoined Congress in presence of then Punjab Chief Minister Amarinder Singh.
