= Narinder Kaur Bharaj =

Indian politician (born 1994)

Member of the Punjab Legislative Assembly
- Incumbent
- Assumed office 10 March 2022
- Preceded by: Vijay Inder Singla
- Constituency: Sangrur

District Youth President, AAP Punjab
- Incumbent
- Assumed office 6 November 2018
- Constituency: Sangrur

Personal details
- Born: 17 August 1994 (age 32) Bharaj, Punjab, India
- Party: Aam Aadmi Party
- Education: Punjabi University

Narinder Kaur Bharaj is an Indian politician and lawyer, and the member of legislative assembly from Sangrur Assembly constituency. She defeated the incumbent cabinet minister Vijay Inder Singla of Indian National Congress in 2022 elections. Also, she became the youngest MLA in Punjab. She is also District youth president of Aam Aadmi Party.

== Early life ==
Bharaj was born on 17 August 1994 to father Gurnam Singh. Her father Gurnam Singh is a farmer. She pursued post graduation in Sociology from Punjabi University. She completed law in a private college in Sangrur.

On 8 October 2022, she married Mandeep Singh, an AAP member.

== Political career ==
Bharaj started her political career in 2014 in a campaign for Bhagwant Mann in Sangrur. She was the only polling booth agent for Mann in her village. In 2018, she became district youth president and spokesperson of Aam Aadmi Party in Sangrur.

=== 2022 elections ===
On 26 December 2021, she was announced candidate of Aam Aadmi Party from Sangrur constituency for 2022 assembly elections. She was among the front runners for the ticket among Minku Jawandha and Dinesh Bansal. After her name was announced Bansal and some other party workers protested at Bhagwant Mann's residence against her candidature. She filed her nomination on 28 January 2022. She declared her assets worth ₹24,409, one of the lowest in the state. She faced cabinet minister Vijay Inder Singla, and former MLA Arvind Khanna as opponents. On 10 March 2022, she secured 74,851 votes (51.67%), and defeated Singla with margin of 36,430 votes, highest-ever in Sangrur. The Aam Aadmi Party gained a strong 79% majority in the sixteenth Punjab Legislative Assembly by winning 92 out of 117 seats in the 2022 Punjab Legislative Assembly election. MP Bhagwant Mann was sworn in as Chief Minister on 16 March 2022.

== Member of Legislative Assembly ==
She represents the Sangrur Assembly constituency as MLA in Punjab Assembly.

Committee assignments of Punjab Legislative Assembly

- Member (2022–23) Committee on Privileges
- Member (2022–23) Committee on Petitions

== Electoral performance ==
2022 Punjab Legislative Assembly election: Sangrur
Party	Candidate	Votes	%	±%
AAP	Narinder Kaur Bharaj	74,851	51.67	+25.97
INC	Vijay Inder Singla	38,421	26.52	−20.88
BJP	Arvind Khanna	13,766	9.5	New entry
SAD	Winnerjit Singh Goldy	10,488	7.24	−17.06
SAD(A)	Gurnaib Singh	4,466	3.08	−1.77
SSP	Jagdeep Singh Mintu Toor	1,209	0.83	New
Majority		36,430	25.15	
Turnout		144,873	76.31	−4.3
Registered electors		189,838		
AAP gain from INC				

State Legislative Assembly
Preceded by Vijay Inder Singla (INC)	Member of the Punjab Legislative Assembly from Sangrur Assembly constituency 2022 –	Incumbent
