= Ghaziabad Development Authority =

Government Authority Ghaziabad

Ghaziabad Development Authority (U.P)
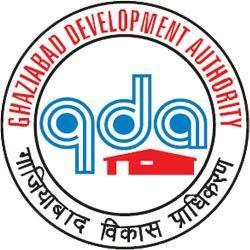
- Logo of Ghaziabad Development Authority (U.P)

Type
- Type: unicameral of the Government of Uttar Pradesh of [[Ghaziabad, Ghaziabad district, Uttar Pradesh, India]]

History
- Founded: 1973

Website
- gdaghaziabad.in//

The Ghaziabad Development Authority (GDA) is a planning authority. The GDA is responsible for planning, development and construction of Housing Projects, Commercial Lands, Land Management as well as providing public facilities like roads, bridges, drains, Underground water reservoir, Community Centers, Sports Centers, Green Belts etc. of Ghaziabad City in Ghaziabad district in Indian state of Uttar Pradesh.

== Master plans ==
The GDA master plan was formed in 1977 to ensure an organized and structured development of haphazard growth of Ghaziabad. This included identification of new land that can be developed into residential properties and make self-contained colonies by providing ample commercial office and retail complexes as well. The GDA master plan was revised in 2021. It lays down the basic infrastructure requirements for a city estimated to have a population of 23 lakhs(2.3 million).

== Housing ==
The development of housing projects by GDA commenced in 1967 with the construction of houses and providing the basic amenities like electricity, water supply, sewage disposal, and other infrastructure facilities. The new projects undertaken instigate with recognition of project sites, public announcement about the new GDA housing schemes in various categories through newspapers and other media advertisements, formal acceptance of the applications, a transparent draw system for short-listing of the applicants and finally allotment of the property.

Some popular GDA Housing Schemes of the past include New Pattern Registration Scheme like Pradhan Mantri Awas Yojana that offers home registration along with the property purchase, Janta Housing Registration Scheme that offers house registrations of LIG & MIG (Lower and Middle Income group)category flats to the SC/ ST registrants. The residential land is allotted to individual applicants, the farmers whose land is acquired for development and group housing societies through public auction.

== Sports complexes ==
Sport Complexes by GDA
No.	Complex Name	Location
1.	Mahamya Sports Stadium	Madhopura, Ghaziabad
2.	Jawaharlal Nehru Stadium	Nehru Nagar, Ghaziabad
3.	Lal Bahadur Shastri Hockey Stadium	Shastri Nagar, Ghaziabad
