= Jasbir Singh (politician) =

Indian politician (c.1941–2019)

(c. 1941 – 27 December 2019) was an Indian politician from Punjab belonging to Indian National Congress. He was a legislator of the Punjab Legislative Assembly. He was a minister of the Punjab Government too.

== Biography ==
Singh was elected as a member of the Punjab Legislative Assembly from Sangrur in 1992. Then, he served as a minister of the Punjab Government in 1992.

Singh died of heart attack on 27 December 2019 at the age of 78.
