= Sangrur =

City in Punjab, India

Sangrur Sangrūr (Punjabi)
- City
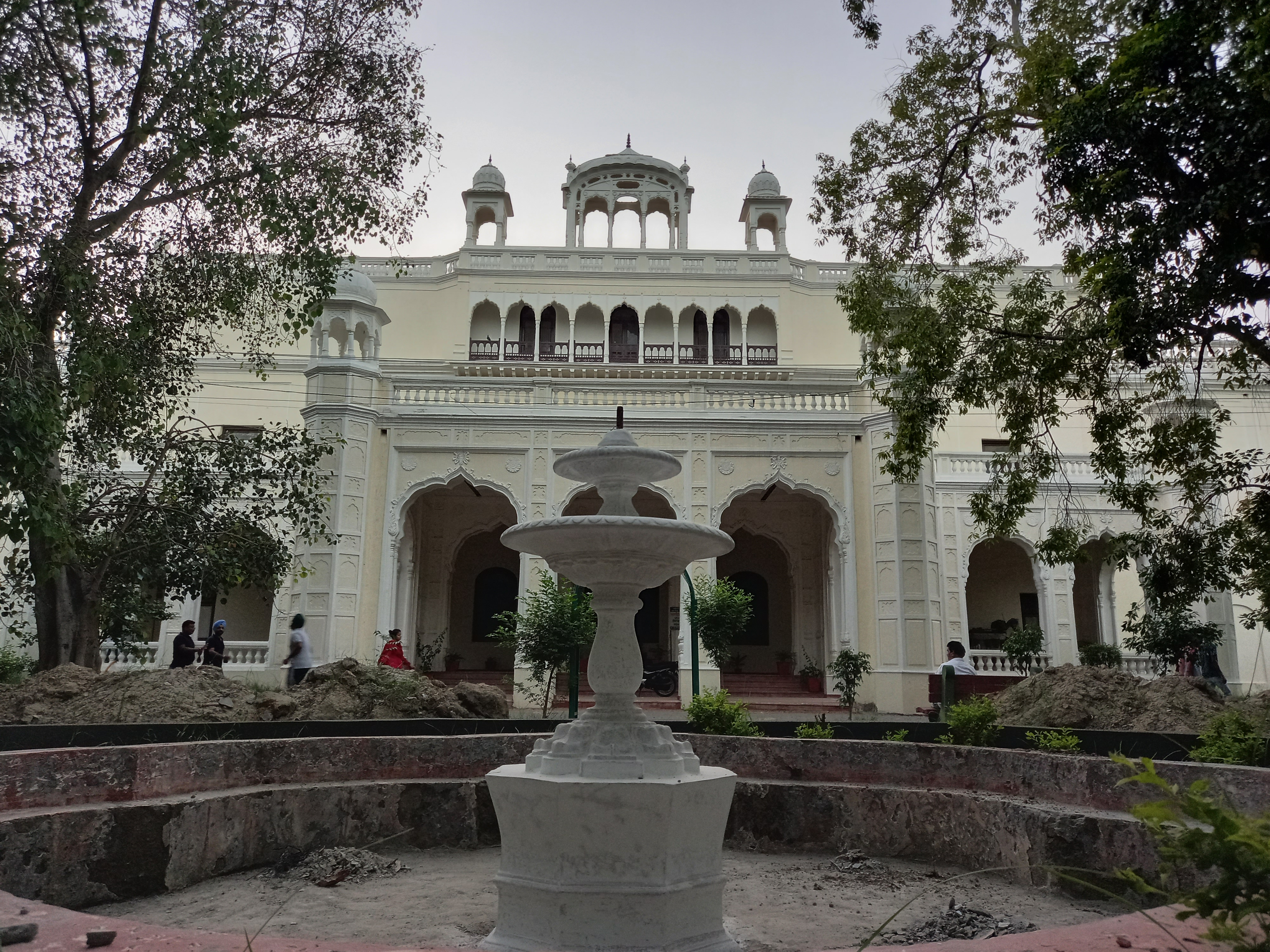
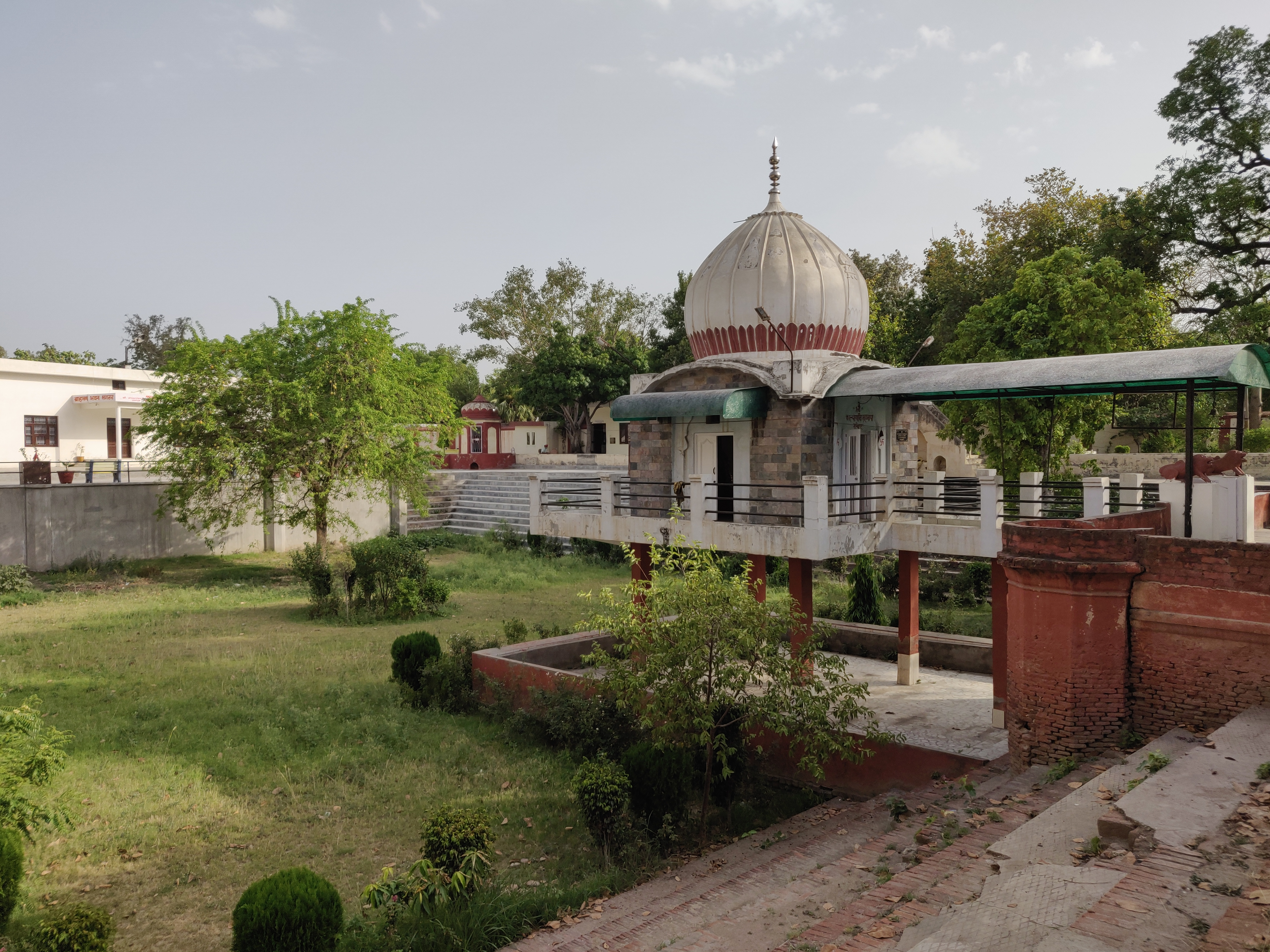
- Clockwise from top: Banasar Bagh Museum, Rajrajeshwari Temple

- Location in Punjab, India Sangrur (India)
- Coordinates: 30°15′02″N 75°50′39″E
- Country: India
- State: Punjab
- District: Sangrur

Government
  - Type: Municipal Council
  - Body: Municipal Council Sangrur
  - MP: Gurmeet Singh Meet Hayer (AAP)
  - MLA: Narinder Kaur Bharaj (AAP)
- Elevation: 237 m (778 ft)

Population (2011)
  - Total: 88,043
- Time zone: UTC+5:30 (IST)
- PIN: 148001
- Telephone code: 01672
- Vehicle registration: PB-13
- Website: sangrur.nic.in

Sangrur is a city in the Indian state of Punjab, India. It is the headquarters of Sangrur district.

== Geography ==
Sangrur is located at 30°15′02″N 75°50′39″E. It has an average elevation of 237 metres (778 feet).

== Climate ==
Climate data for Sangrur (1971–1990)
Month	Jan	Feb	Mar	Apr	May	Jun	Jul	Aug	Sep	Oct	Nov	Dec	Year
Record high °C (°F)	29.0 (84.2)	33.3 (91.9)	41.1 (106.0)	46.1 (115.0)	48.3 (118.9)	47.9 (118.2)	47.8 (118.0)	44.4 (111.9)	41.7 (107.1)	40.0 (104.0)	35.8 (96.4)	29.4 (84.9)	48.3 (118.9)
Mean daily maximum °C (°F)	18.9 (66.0)	21.0 (69.8)	26.0 (78.8)	34.6 (94.3)	38.8 (101.8)	39.6 (103.3)	34.9 (94.8)	32.9 (91.2)	33.4 (92.1)	32.0 (89.6)	26.4 (79.5)	20.7 (69.3)	29.9 (85.8)
Daily mean °C (°F)	12.8 (55.0)	14.8 (58.6)	19.4 (66.9)	26.7 (80.1)	31.1 (88.0)	33.0 (91.4)	30.5 (86.9)	28.8 (83.8)	28.5 (83.3)	24.9 (76.8)	19.0 (66.2)	14.1 (57.4)	23.6 (74.5)
Mean daily minimum °C (°F)	6.7 (44.1)	8.5 (47.3)	12.8 (55.0)	18.8 (65.8)	23.3 (73.9)	26.2 (79.2)	26.1 (79.0)	24.8 (76.6)	23.4 (74.1)	17.7 (63.9)	11.6 (52.9)	7.4 (45.3)	17.3 (63.1)
Record low °C (°F)	−2.2 (28.0)	−1.1 (30.0)	1.4 (34.5)	7.1 (44.8)	11.7 (53.1)	18.0 (64.4)	17.4 (63.3)	18.0 (64.4)	15.2 (59.4)	9.4 (48.9)	0.3 (32.5)	−1.1 (30.0)	−2.2 (28.0)
Average precipitation mm (inches)	21 (0.8)	39 (1.5)	31 (1.2)	20 (0.8)	20 (0.8)	60 (2.4)	229 (9.0)	189 (7.4)	85 (3.3)	5 (0.2)	13 (0.5)	21 (0.8)	733 (28.9)
Average precipitation days (≥ 1.0 mm)	2.8	3.6	4.5	1.9	2.3	4.7	11.6	9.6	4.5	0.5	1.4	2.1	49.5
Average relative humidity (%)	74	66	62	44	39	49	71	76	68	61	68	74	63
Source 1: NOAA
Source 2: India Meteorological Department (record high and low up to 2010)

== Health services ==
City has PGIMER Satellite Centre Sangrur for providing medical facilities to citizens. Homi Bhabha Cancer Hospital has been set up at Sangrur by Tata Memorial Centre in collaboration with Govt. of Punjab

== Demographics ==
Religion in Sangrur
Religion	Percent
Hinduism	60.90%
Sikhism	35.58%
Islam	2.61%
Others	0.91%

At the 2011 census Sangrur Municipal Council had a population of 88,043 with 46,931 males and 41,112 females, giving a gender ratio of 876. There were 9,027 children 0–6 years old and an overall literacy rate of 83.54% – 87.92% for males and 78.56% for females.

== Politics ==
Sangrur parliamentary constituency is one of the 13 Lok Sabha seats in the State of Punjab. In Lok Sabha Elections 2024, Aam Aadmi Party candidate Gurmeet Singh Meet Hayer won from Punjab's Sangrur Lok Sabha seat after defeating his nearest rival and Congress party's Sukhpal Singh Khaira, according to the Election Commission.

== Tourist attractions ==
=== Banasar Bagh ===
The Banasar Garden of Sangrur City is the most popular picnic spot of the city. It is a building with 12 doors having a marble Baradari. It lies in the middle of a pond, which is accessible through a small bridge. This bridge leads to a marble gate, which is present on the western side of these gardens. Its surroundings comprise four towers, numerous walkways, many plants and trees, and a mini zoo. In ancient times, the rulers of Jind State used to spend their summers in the buildings around these gardens.

=== The Jind State Memorial Museum ===
The Durbar Hall, built in or around 1865, in the Banasar Bagh complex is now converted into a museum by the Department of Culture, Punjab Government, which houses a collection of items used by the Jind State Royals. Also it has a collection of arms and armoury displayed.

=== Shahi Samadhan ===
The 'Shahi Samadhan' or the tombs of the erstwhile Jind state's rulers. Of the 16 samadhis, 14 were constructed over 125 years ago with bricks and lime-surkhi (brick powder), while two were built around 60–65 years ago with marble and other materials. Some of these samadhis are of Maharaja Ranjit Singh's maternal grandfather Maharaja Gajpat Singh and maternal uncle Maharaja Bhag Singh, Maharaja Fateh Singh, Maharaja Sangat Singh, Maharaja Sarup Singh, Maharaja Ranbir Singh and Maharaja Rajbir Singh. All these samadhis are situated in a complex outside the Nabha Gate.

=== The Clock Tower ===
The heritage Clock Tower, constructed in 1885, is located near the Judicial Courts complex. The grand clock tower was commissioned by Maharaja Raghubir Singh from the Canal Foundry Roorkee.

=== Maha Kali Devi Mandir ===
The Maha Kali Devi Ji temple, built in 1867, is located on Patiala Gate Market Road. The temple complex houses shrines of various Hindu deities.

== Notable people ==
- Karamjit Anmol, comedian, actor and singer
- Brish Bhan, Indian independence activist and politician
- Binnu Dhillon, comedian, actor
- Naresh Goyal, founder of Jet Airways
- Gulab Kaur, Indian freedom fighter
- Bhagwant Mann, current Chief Minister of Punjab
- Rana Ranbir, comedian, actor
- Akali Phula Singh, prominent Sikh leader
- Udham Singh, freedom fighter
- Sardar Sohi, actor
- Joginder Singh Ugrahan, farmer leader
- Kabir Waraich, racing driver
