= Trilok Singh Chitarkar =

Indian painter

- ਤ੍ਰਿਲੋਕ ਸਿੰਘ ਚਿੱਤਰਕਾਰ
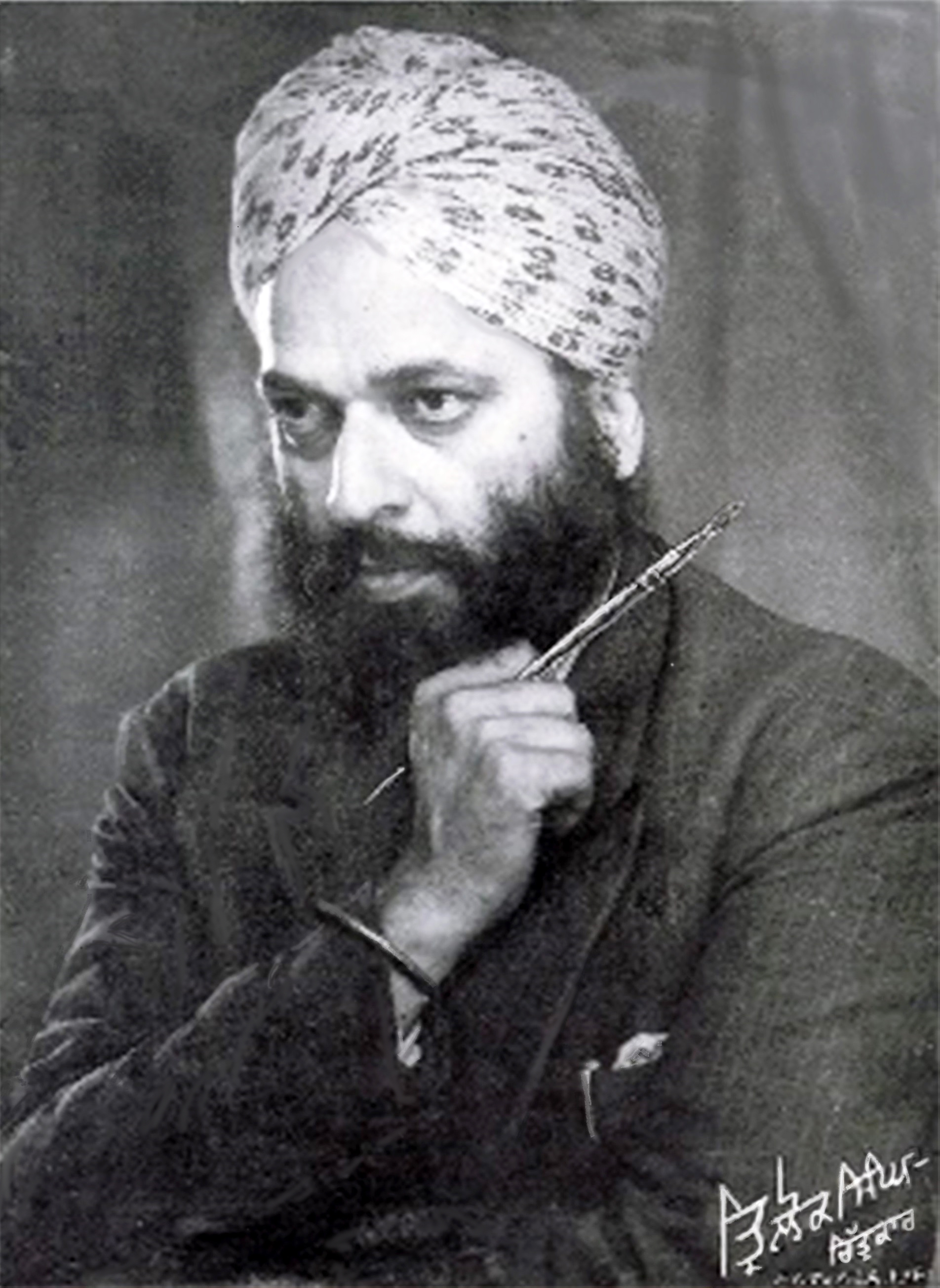
- Trilok Singh Artist (Chitarkar) 1953
- Born: 10 December 1914; Jartauli (Ludhiana District)
- Died: 11 December 1990; Patiala, Punjab, India
- Known for: Painting
- Spouse: Harbans Kaur
- Memorials: Chitralok Art Gallery, Patiala
- Website: www.triloksinghartist.com

Trilok Singh Chitarkar (1914–1990) was an Indian painter. He style of presented himself through variety of themes - Sikh religion, history, culture, folk lore, love legends, portraits, social evils, nature, illustration of Gurbani, Shabads, visuals in Punjabi Encyclopedia and books. He was well versed with deep knowledge of Gurbani, history and religion. He knew many languages i.e. Gurmukhi, Punjabi, Hindi, English, Urdu, Persian, Assamese and Bengali. He translated articles from Bengali to Punjabi and published these in the book titled Bangla De Daab in 1974. The Artist was honoured in 1973 by the Chief Minister, Punjab, India Giani Zail Singh at a state level function organised at his residence, Chitralok, Patiala. Language department, Punjab published a book in Punjabi-Chitralok's Contribution to Art and released on the 70th birthday of the artist, 10 December 1984 at a special function organised in Central Library at Patiala for his contribution to Art.

He is the first Punjabi Artist on whose works Ph.D. degree Art of Trilok Singh was awarded by Punjabi University, Patiala. A Gold medal has been established in the name of the artist and it is awarded to the topper of M.A. Fine Arts. He was appointed as a State Artist in erstwhile PEPSU state of Punjab in 1948 and later worked as Artist in Department of Languages, Punjab. He lived and worked all over India and spent last years of his life in Patiala town in Punjab state in India.

== Biography ==
=== Early life ===
Trilok Singh was born in village Jartauli, District Ludhiana to father Gurdit Singh and mother Daya Kaur. He was married to Harbans Kaur and has one daughter and three sons.

His father was a civil engineer, who worked in the Uganda Railway, Cape Government Railways, South African Republic and then in East Bengal Railways at Assam. His mother died during his childhood and he spent his childhood in Jartauli under the supervision of his grandfather Baba Daya Singh.His grandfather's knowledge of Gurbani was a boon and blessing for him beyond limits. The artist always felt that his success in life and art is only due to good training, blessing, motivation of his grandfather. He was studying in 10th class in a school at Kila Raipur, District Ludhiana when his grandfather died.

=== Education and training ===
In 1930, his father took him to Assam and gave him the responsibility to prepare land for agriculture purpose. He lived in Punjabi Basti in Lanka, District Nawgong, Assam. The natural beauty of Assam attracted him. In his free time he enjoyed drawing the nature. His creative genius arose from within and he start drawing and painting. His father thought of famous Artist S.G. Thakur Singh who was in Calcutta at that time. His father sent drawings to the artist to know whether his son would be successful in the field of art. On getting positive response. His father sent him to Calcutta in 1931 to take further professional guidance in art. He started working hard to learn. Once when Artist S.G. Thakur Singh came to know that his father has sent him money, he scolded him and advised him saying he has no right to ask for money from his father, rather he should earn money and send to his father.

=== Painting career ===
In 1932, the artist set up Trilok Studio Arts (TSA) and named it Trilok Shilp Asthan and on other side a car paint workshop situated at 7, Ashutosh Mukherjee Road in Calcutta. Shortly, it became very popular. He often spent time with Punjabi poets, writers and Bengali artists. The first biographical detail of Trilok Singh was published in 1932 in a monthly Punjabi magazine of Calcutta Pulwari by the editor Heera Singh Dard. He got silver medal for his painting in All India Ramgharia Federation, Kharagpur, Bengal in 1932. Next year, he participated in an exhibition of All India Fine Arts Association held in Calcutta. Picture of two famous Sikh artists Trilok Singh and S.G. Thakur Singh was published in special edition of Punjabi newspaper Desh Darpan, Calcutta on 11 January 1935 page 36.

In 1937, the artist with his family had to shift to Assam to look after his agricultural land as his father was very sick.There he designed an appliance attached to cart for automatic rice plantation which was pulled with a pair of bulls. It was known as 'Dhan Roopa Kala'. He helped his father in agriculture and also opened Art Studio Navrang in Nowgong. In 1938, two paintings -Mahatma Gandhi and Subhas Chandra Bose - were prepared and sent to Congress session at Haripur in Assam. He welcomed Jawaharlal Nehru at Chhaparmukh railway station, Assam and garlanded him. Next day, he attended the session and presented Pt. Nehru his painting on patriotism. While receiving it, Nehru said you are very useful artist to our country. In 1938, Sh. Gopinath Bordoloi formed the government in Assam. In 1939, the artist completed the painting ‘Mother India with flambeau’ showing his patriotic feelings.

After the death of his father, the responsibility of agricultural land and his profession fell on his shoulders. Suddenly, his son Surjit Singh fell sick and he took his son to Shillong for a change of climate. It was a very hard time for Trilok Singh. The health of his son was deteriorating day by day. He got his son admitted in The Hills Welsh Mission Hospital (Dr. H. Gordon Roberts Hospital, Shillong). To meet medical expenses, he started going to military base, prepared pencil sketches, portraits of soldiers, took photographs & developed in box camera fitted on his bicycle. He prepared a painting of Jesus Christ blessing the hospital and gifted it to the hospital on Christmas when his son recovered. Dr. Hughes Gordon Robert, Welsh Presbyterian Mission and founder of the hospital thanked the artist for the beautiful gift vide his letter Ref.no 239 dated 29 December 1941. As a mark of blessings of Almighty, he started study of Guru Nanak's life and preparing it on canvas. He ran Art and Photography studio 'Navrang' in Shillong for two years. He was blessed with second child, a daughter 'Jagdish Kaur'.

=== Return to the Punjab ===
In 1944, he shifted back to his native village Jartaulli in Punjab. He came in contact with Bhai Sahib Bhai Randhir Singh who lived in Village Narangwal about 2 km from his residence. He prepared painting of Bhai Randhir Singh who stood before him.Bhai Randhir Singh himself honoured him with Siropa, Rs125/- as token of love. Bhai Sahib advised him to prepare painting of Guru Gobind Singh. To make the painting, he travelled to Anandpur Sahib, Privar Vichora, Bhatha Sahib, Chamkaur Sahib, Machhiwara, Alamgir on his bicycle to understand the nature of that area. Bhai Sahib happily received the painting of Guru Gobind Singh. He met S. Hardarshan Singh Jeji in 1945 in Patiala and handed over Bhai Sahib's letter. He also met Maharaja of Patiala with the painting. He also visited Delhi on 14 April 1946 and met Congress leaders Pandit Nehru, Asif Ali and others. With due advise from Bhai Sahib, he joined as instructor in paint workshop at 117 E.T.C. military training center, Meerut cantonment Meerut. He worked there for two years. India got independence in 1947.

=== Later career ===
Trilok Singh was adjudged the best in painting competition held for the post of State Artist in Patiala & East Punjab States Union (PEPSU) and offered him the job. He joined on 8-06-1948. During this tenure, he was associated with art work of Rikanjat Secretariat, Punjabi and Archives department, Museum, Darbar Hall (Qilla Mubark). Rai Sahib Ganga Singh, State Artist (PEPSU), Specialist in Drawing and Painting ( University College London) wrote about Trilok Singh on 29-03-1951 :- I have had the opportunity to examine his work several times, I always found that he is up to the mark. He is very strong in perspective drawing and making original designs, which in fact is the key of success in Fine Arts. His work that he has done in Darbar Hall (Qilla Mubark) during this period would speak the efficiency itself. ( original letter is with Jotinder Singh, Chitralok, Patiala). He worked on this post up to 31-03-1951.

In 1951, Trilok Singh joined Punjabi Mehkma (PEPSU) as artist (Chitarkar). Dr. Ganda Singh was holding the charge as Director of the department at that time. The artist was member of decoration committee of Assembly Hall, PEPSU. He designed illustrations of publications, portraits and preparation of four volumes of Mahankosh (Punjabi Encyclopedia) into one book. Till 1956, Punjabi Mehkma status was temporary one, the artist and Inder Singh Chakarvarti were instrumental in getting Punjabi Mehkma status as permanent from Raja Surendra Singh of Nalagarh State, finance minister, PEPSU. After the merger of PEPSU in Punjab on 1 November 1956 it became Language department, Punjab. He was a member of Arts Study Center, Punjabi University, Patiala 1962–64. He was the life member of Indian Academy of Fine Arts, Amritsar and Chandigarh Lalit Kala Akademi. His retirement was due in 1972 but Punjab Govt. gave him extension of two years. After retirement, he devoted his time to art and illustrated the messages of Gurbani though his paintings.

=== Last days at Patiala ===
Jotinder Singh, youngest son of the artist, was living and looking after them. His wife died on 6 June 1990. The Artist wrote his will on 13 July 1990 that he will continue to dedicate himself to art work and his son Jotinder Singh will be the owner of all his works thereafter. He also wrote in the Will that his son looked after them like Gurdev Mata and Gurdev Pita and takes care of his works with love and devotion.

He completed his last painting a day before his death. He was honoured for his contribution to art at Ludhiana two days before his death i.e. 9 December 1990.

Last day. On 11 December 1990, he got ready in morning as usual and asked his son to take his photograph before leaving for Delhi. Then he went to Municipal committee for street work and became unconscious sitting with Executive Officer. They immediately took him to Rajindra Hospital. Doctors declared him dead. Harpal Kaur w/o Jotinder Singh went to the hospital and brought his body. The last day photograph has been fixed on title page of Ph.D research thesis - Art of Trilok Singh.

The artist always felt that life is too short, there is still lot is to be done. He devoted 58 years of his life in the field of art.

== Awards and honors ==
Giani Zail Singh, the then Chief Minister of Punjab inaugurated his art gallery Chitralok, in Patiala in 1973. and named a street Chitra-Lok Marg after him.

Punjabi University instituted the Sardar Trilok Singh Chitarkar Gold Medal in his memory, conferred annually on the top M.A. student. The book Chitralok's contribution to Art was published in Punjabi by the Department of Languages, Punjab in 1984.

There have been many exhibitions of his work in Punjab, India.

== Paintings ==
Being a very religious person, his knowledge about sikh religion is reflected in all his paintings. During initial days of his career, his works mostly focused towards freedom struggle of India and Patriotism. Later on his works represented teachings of Guru Granth Sahib. He also prepared illustrations of many books including Guru Gobind Singh Marg, while working with Punjab Language deptt. These original paintings by Trilok Singh Chitarkar are on display in Chitralok Art Gallery, Patiala.

=== Pre Independence works (1933 to 1947) ===
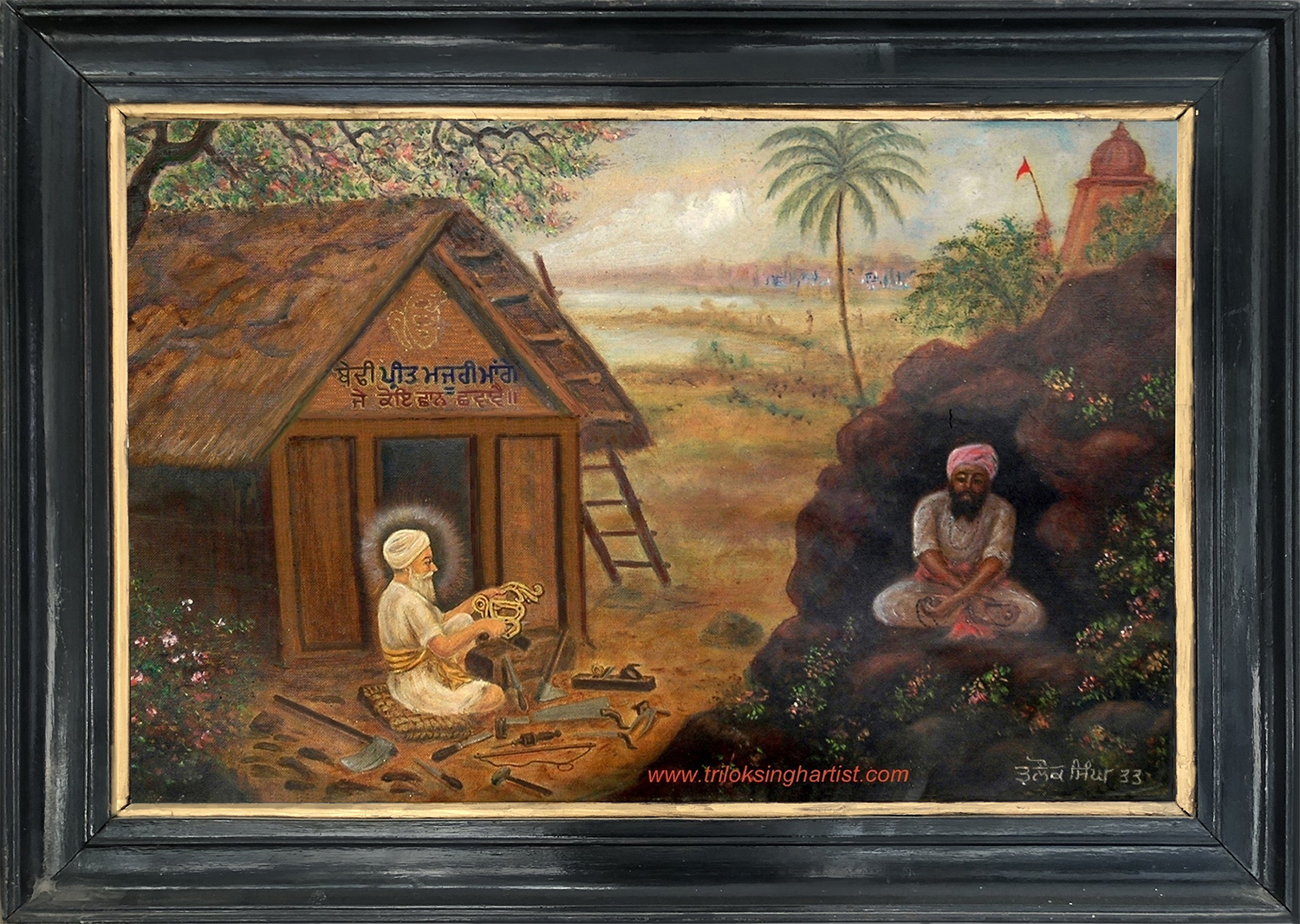
1933- Bhagat Naam Dev

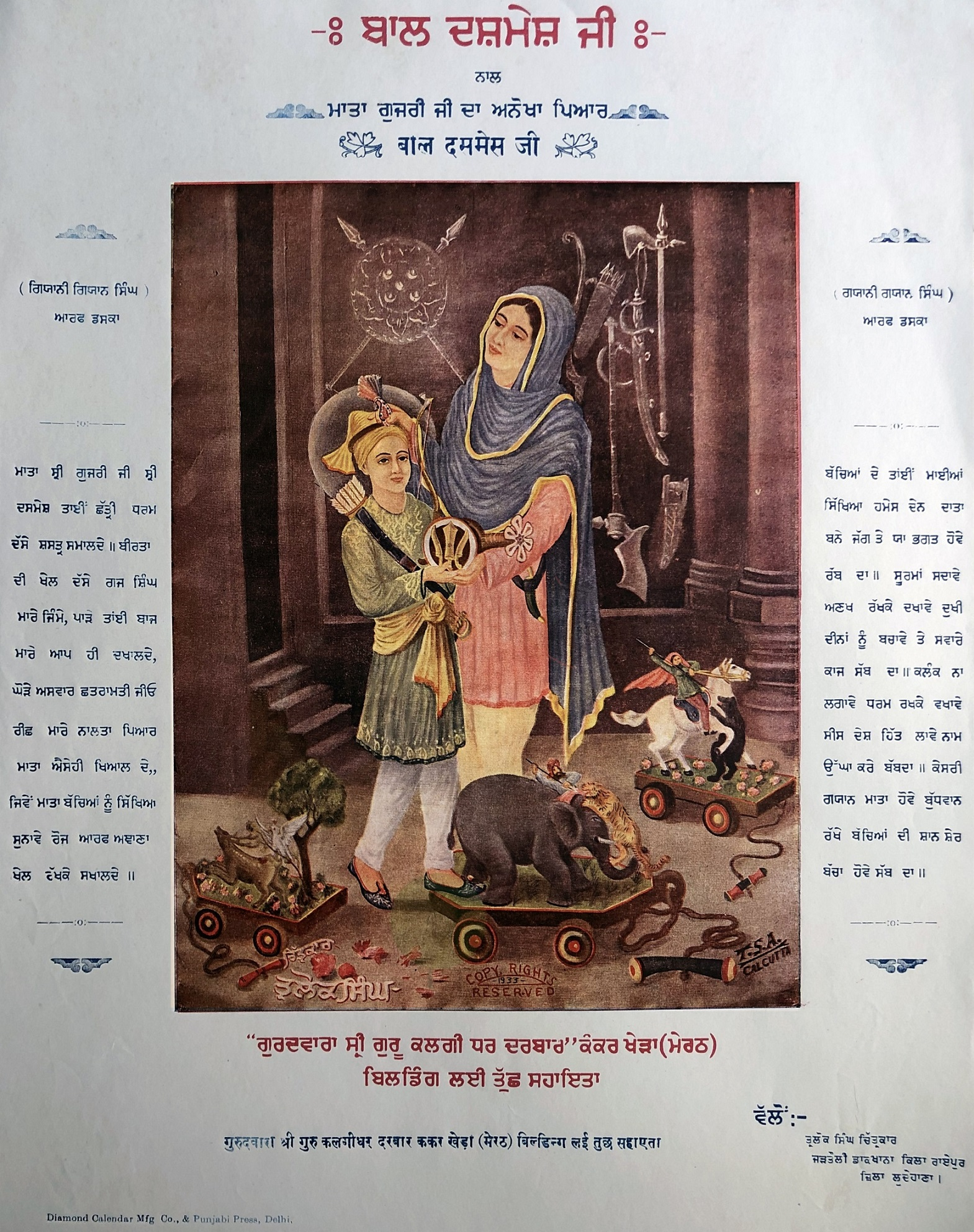
1933-Bal Deshmesh ji

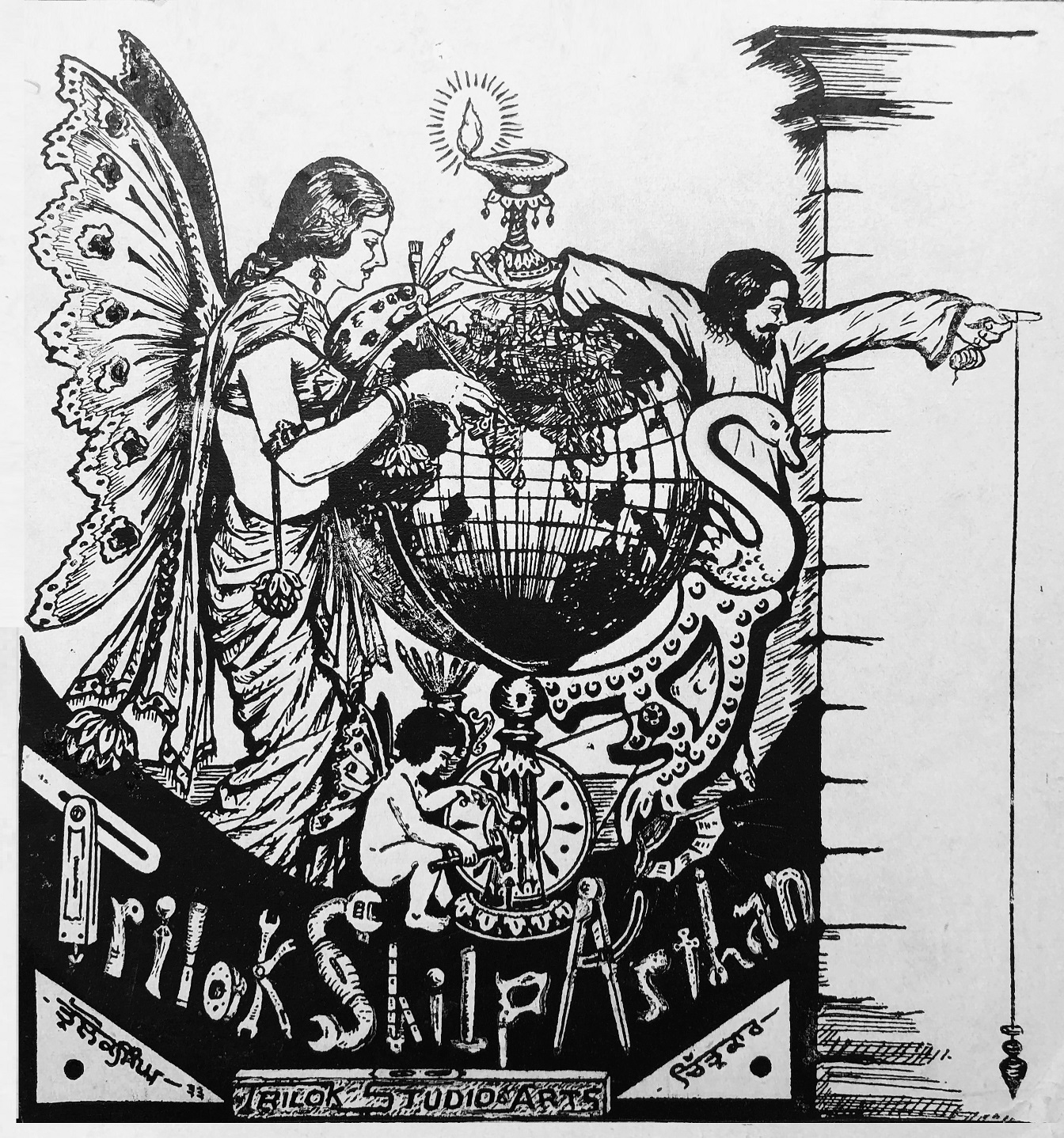
1933-Trilok Studio Arts, Calcutta

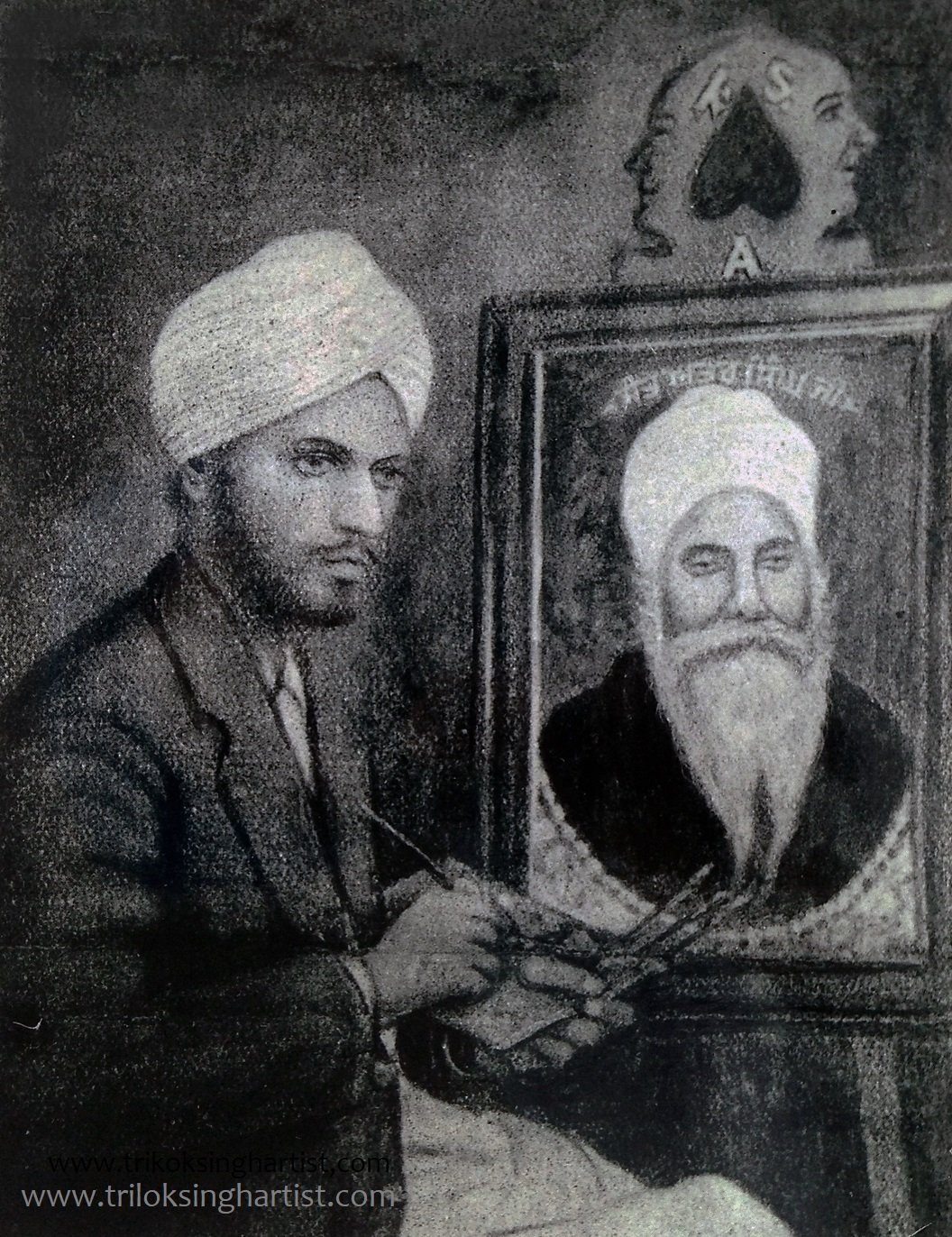
1935-Artist working on a Portrait

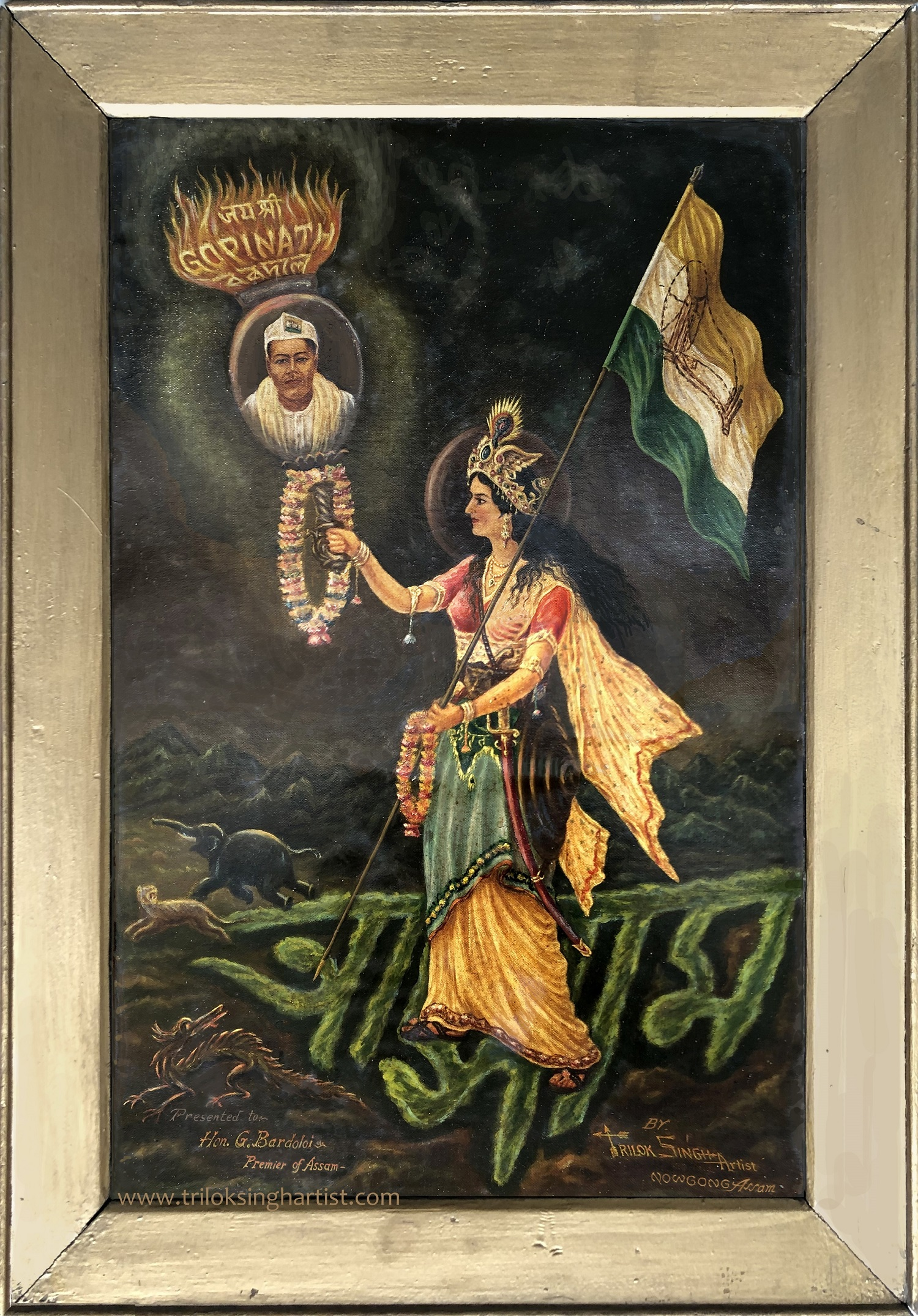
1938-Independence movement

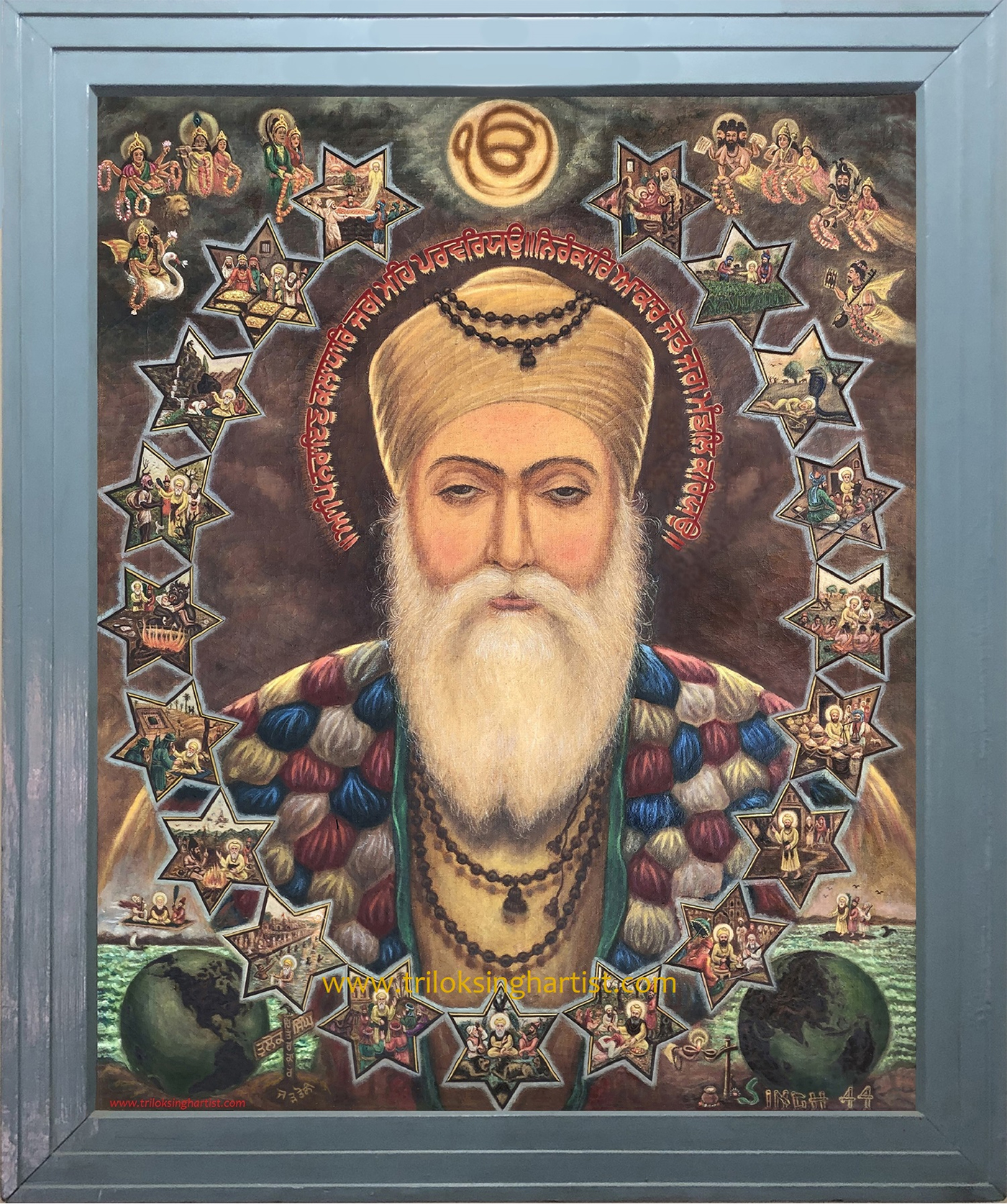
1944- Guru Nanak's life in 19 stars

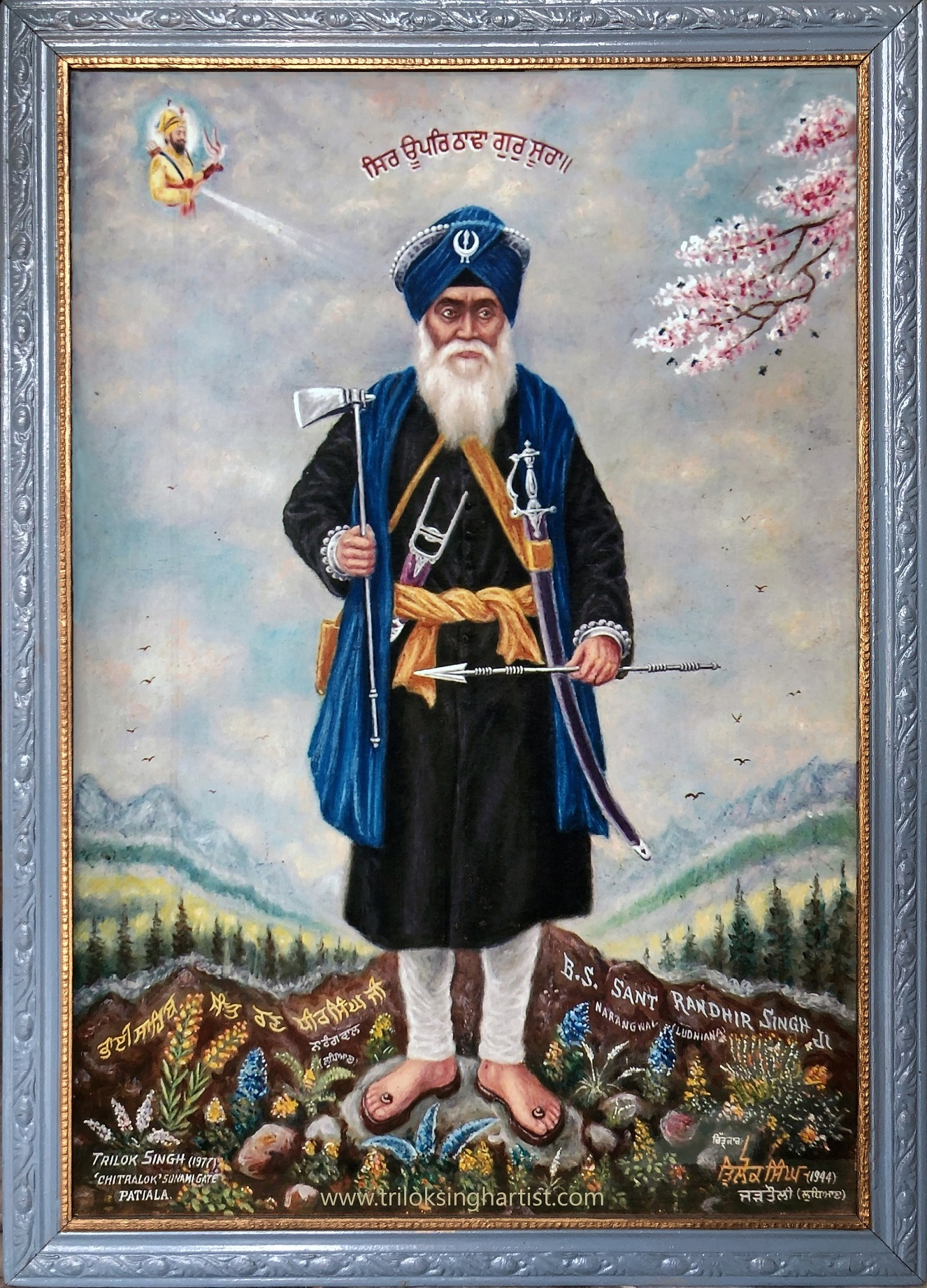
1944- Bhai Randhir Singh

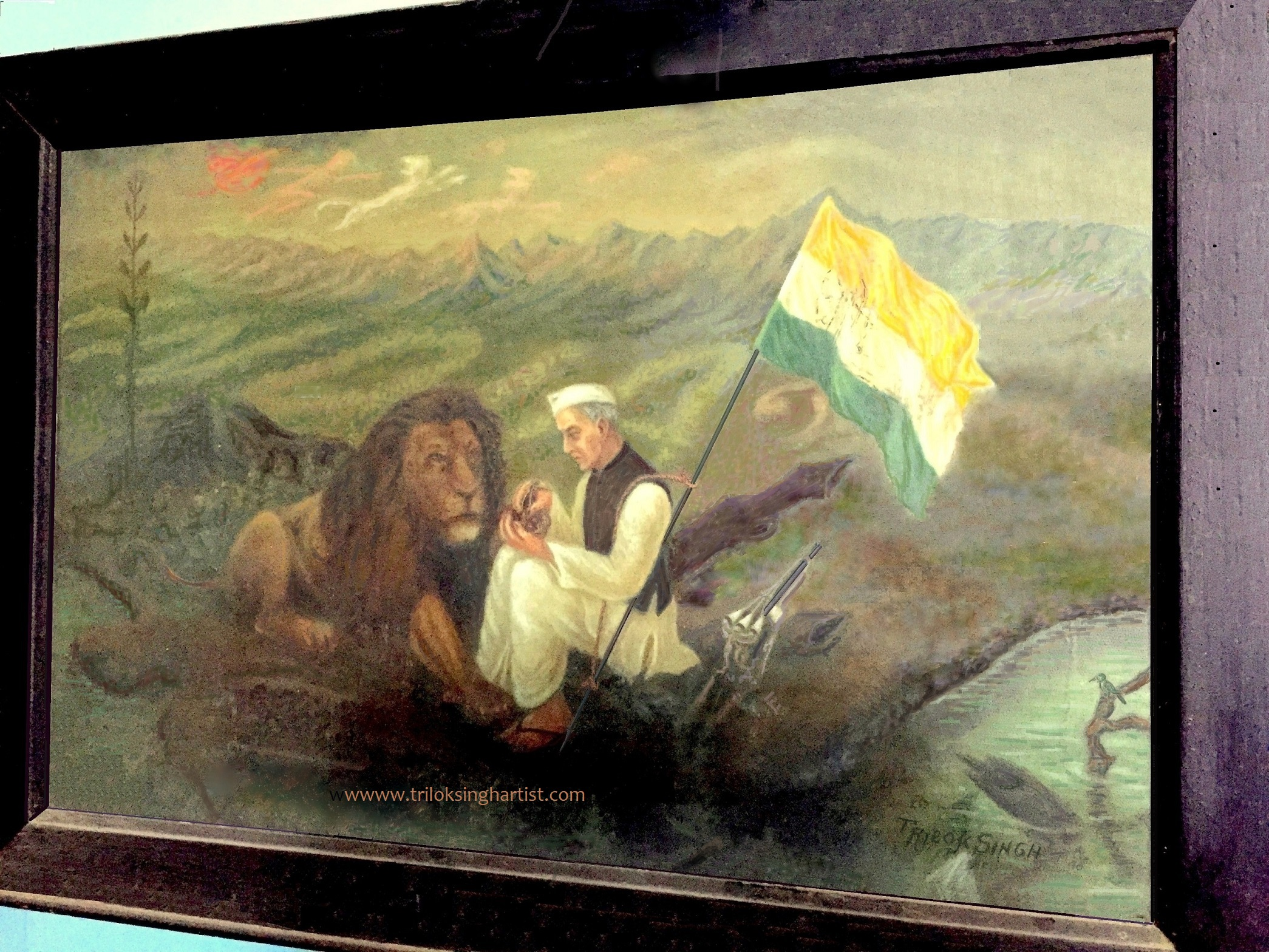
1945-Freedom struggle

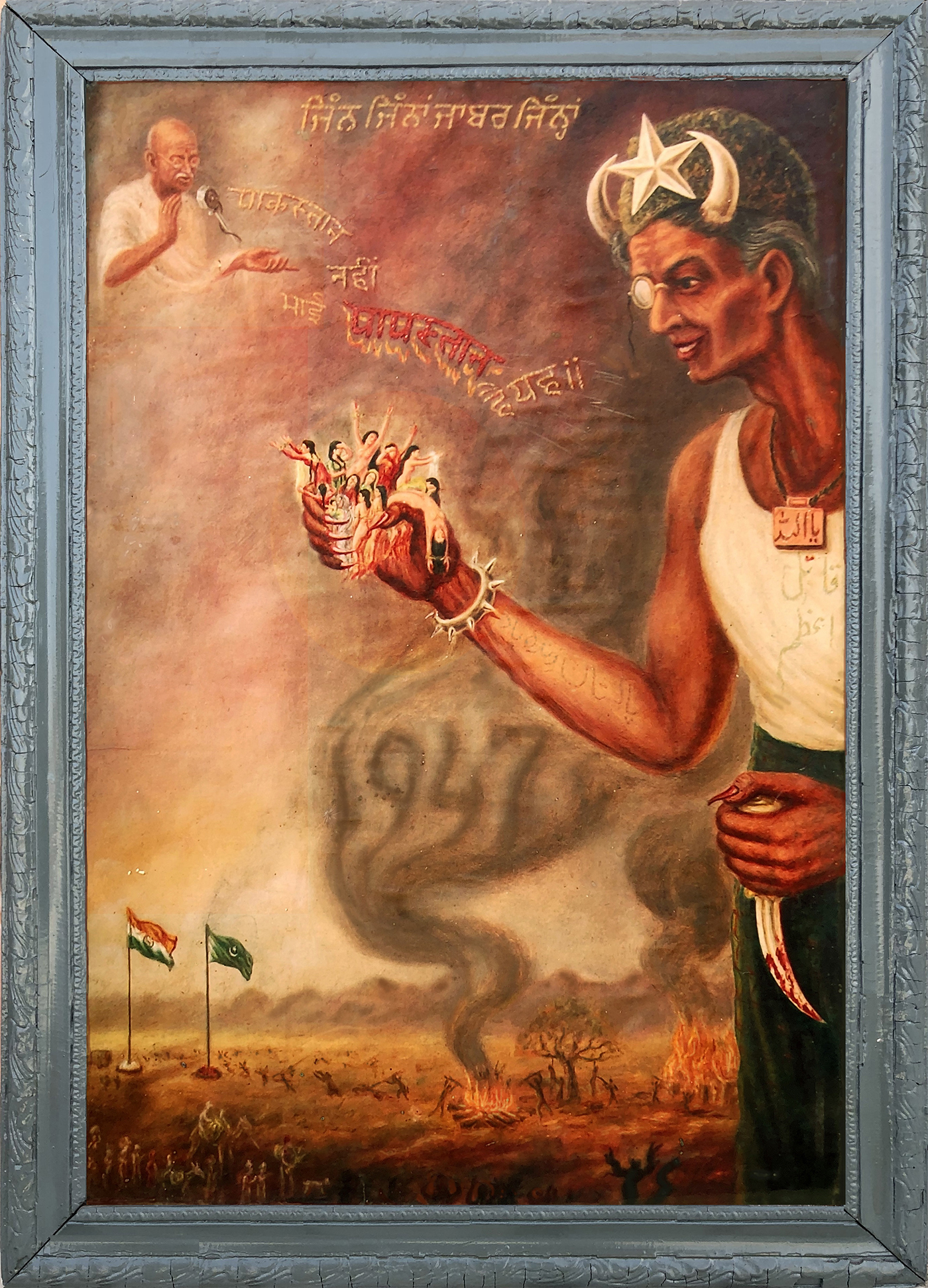
1947-India's Partition

=== Post Independence works (1948 to 1990) ===
He worked on variety of themes. Some of his works are presented in following categories:-

Love legends-

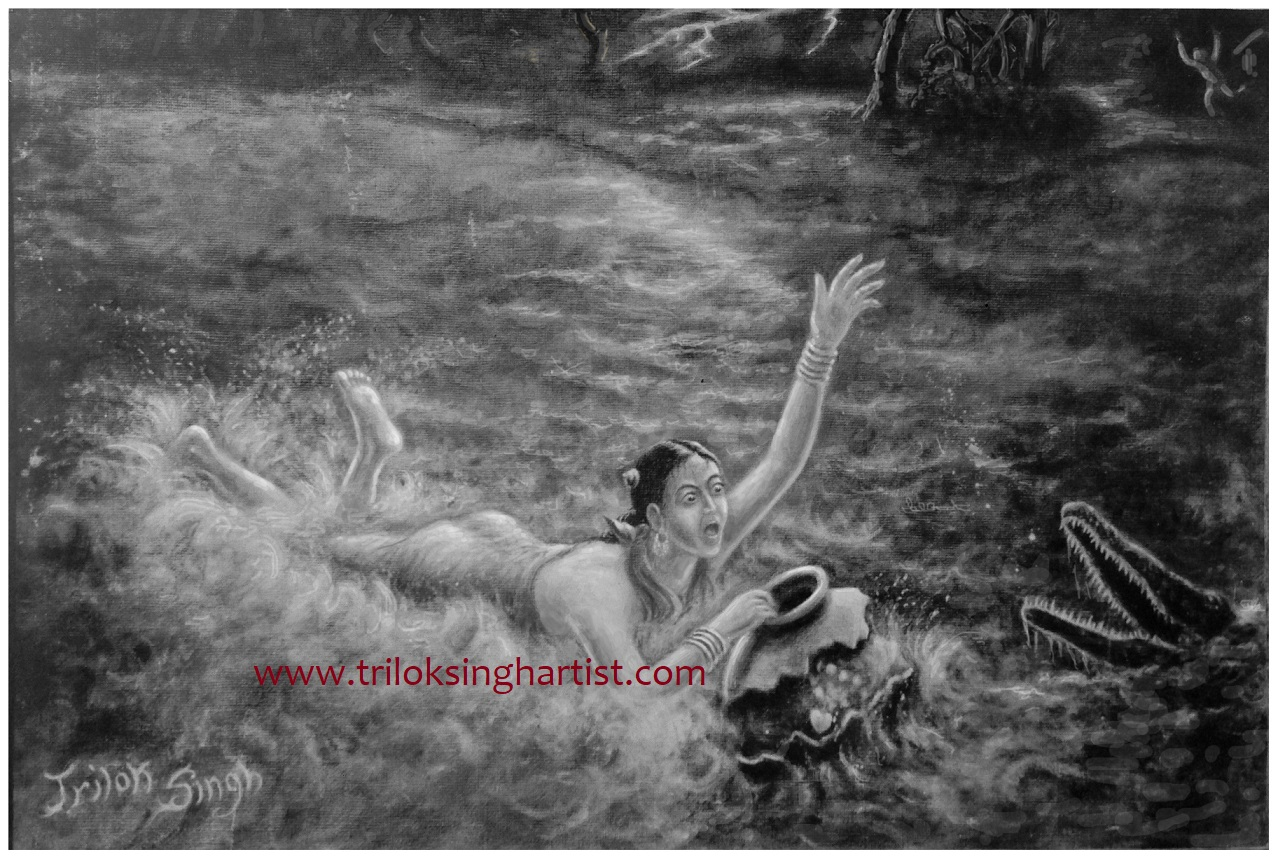
1955- Sohni Mahiwal

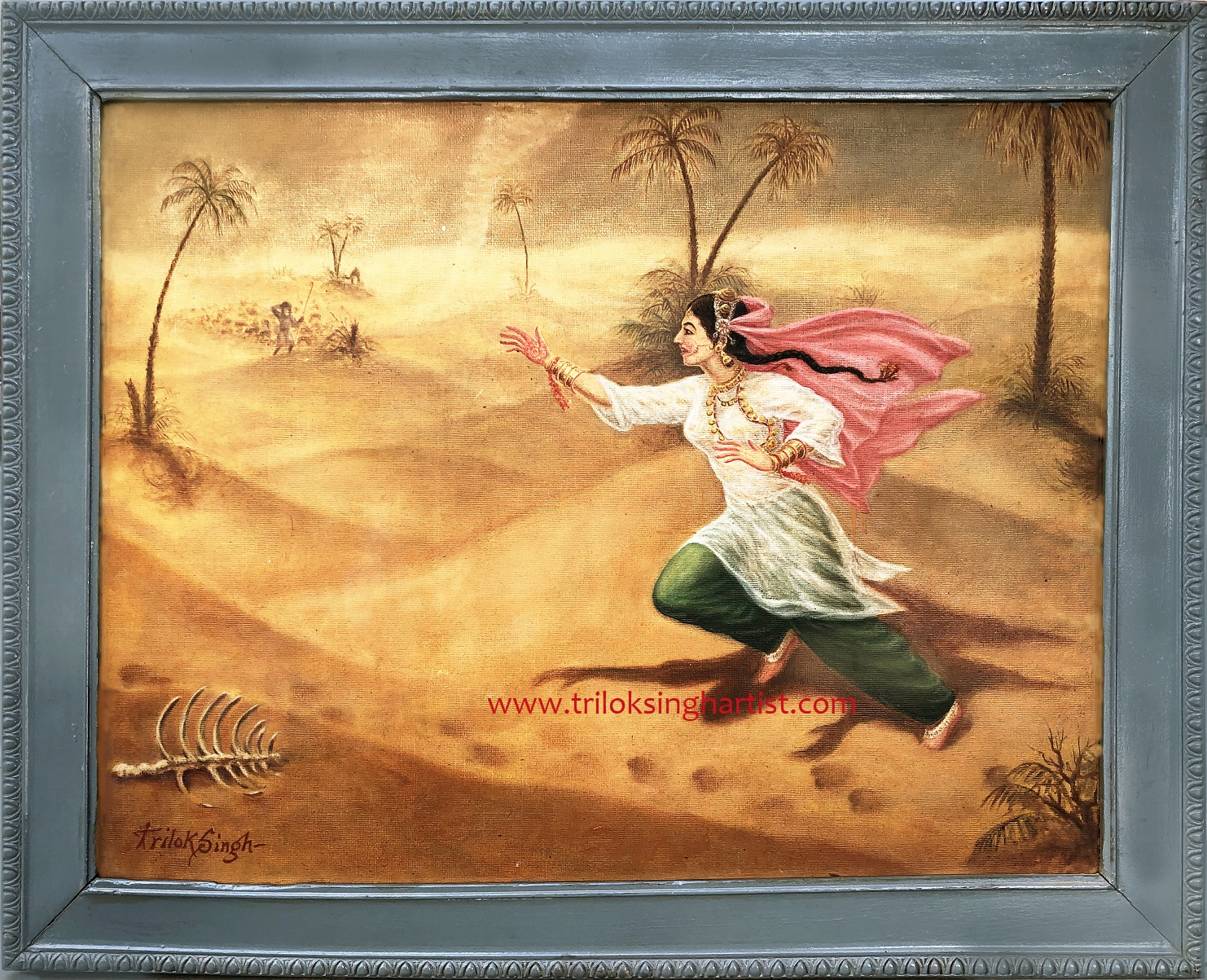
1954- Sassui Punnhun

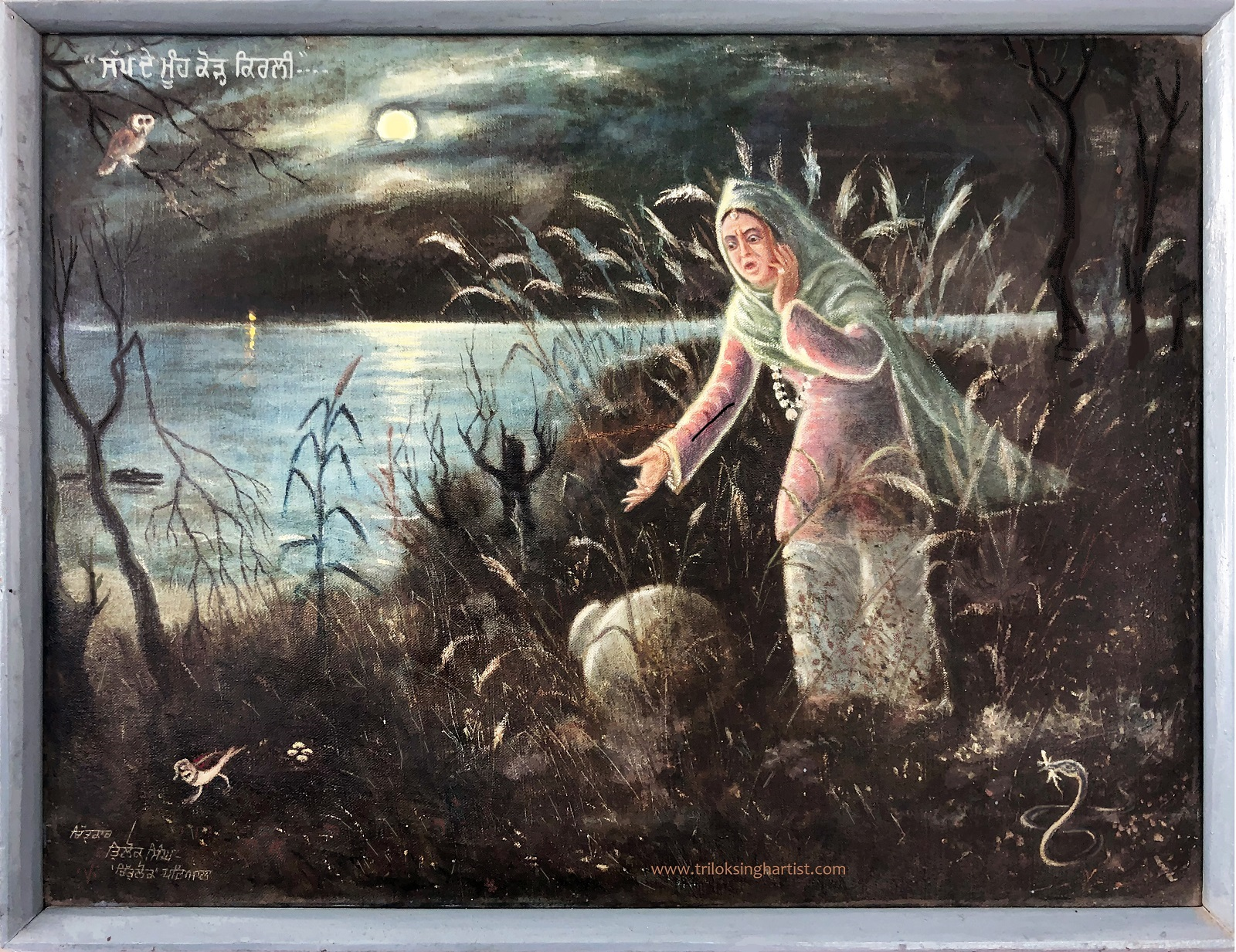
1970s - Sohni Mahiwal

Womenhood

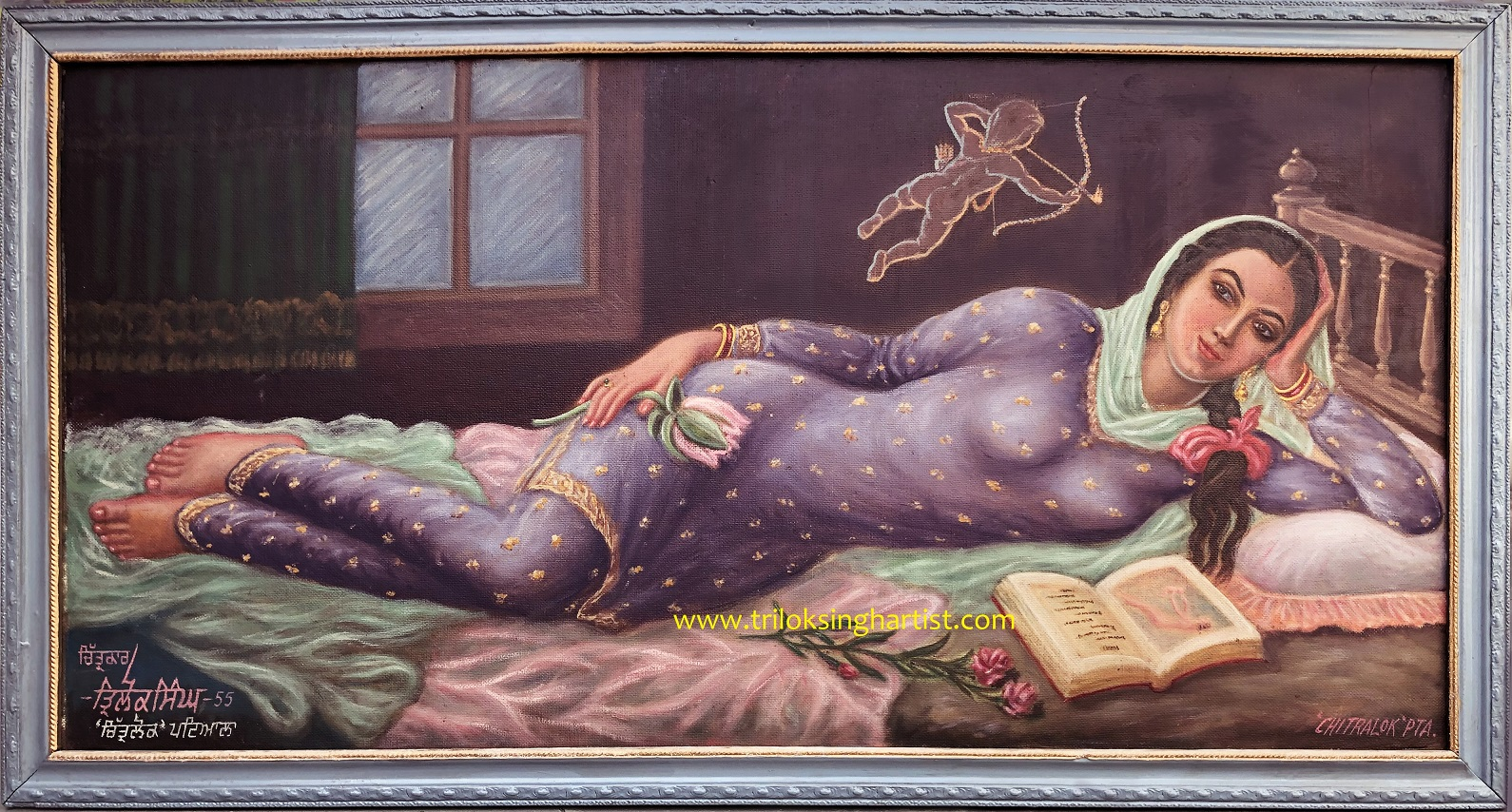
1955-Lady reading a book - an Indian woman and her baby.

Landscape

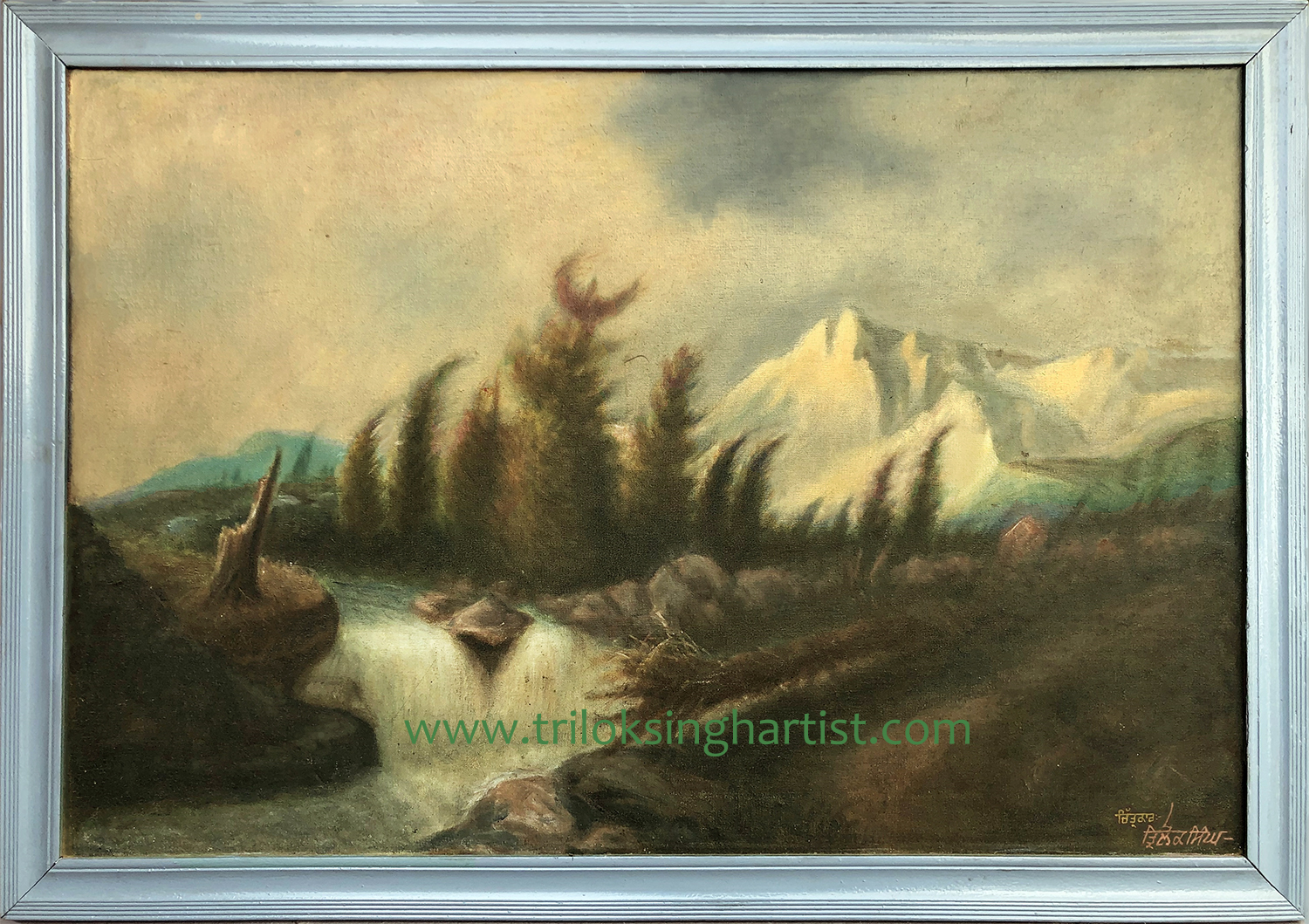
1960s - Landscape

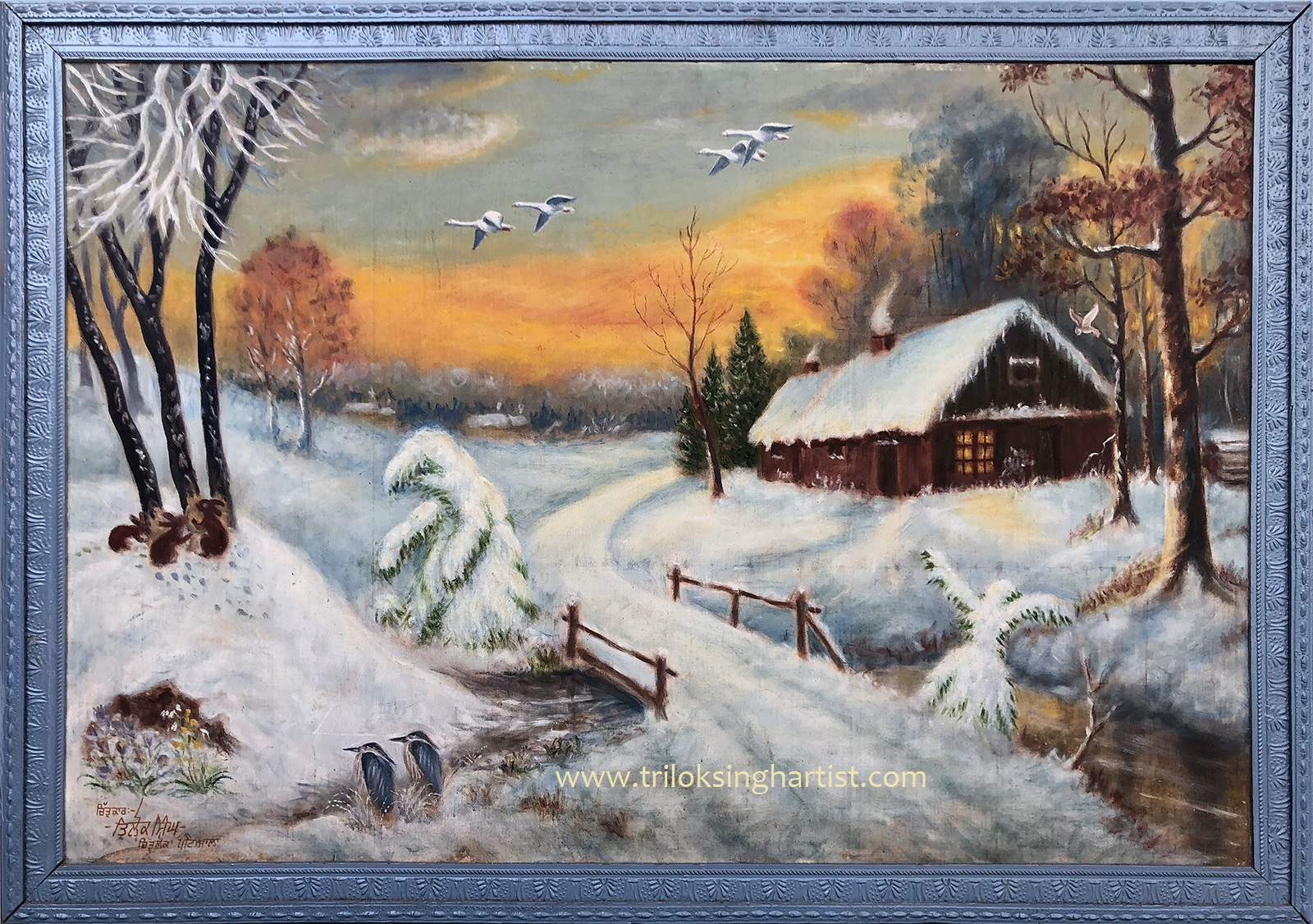
1970s- landscape

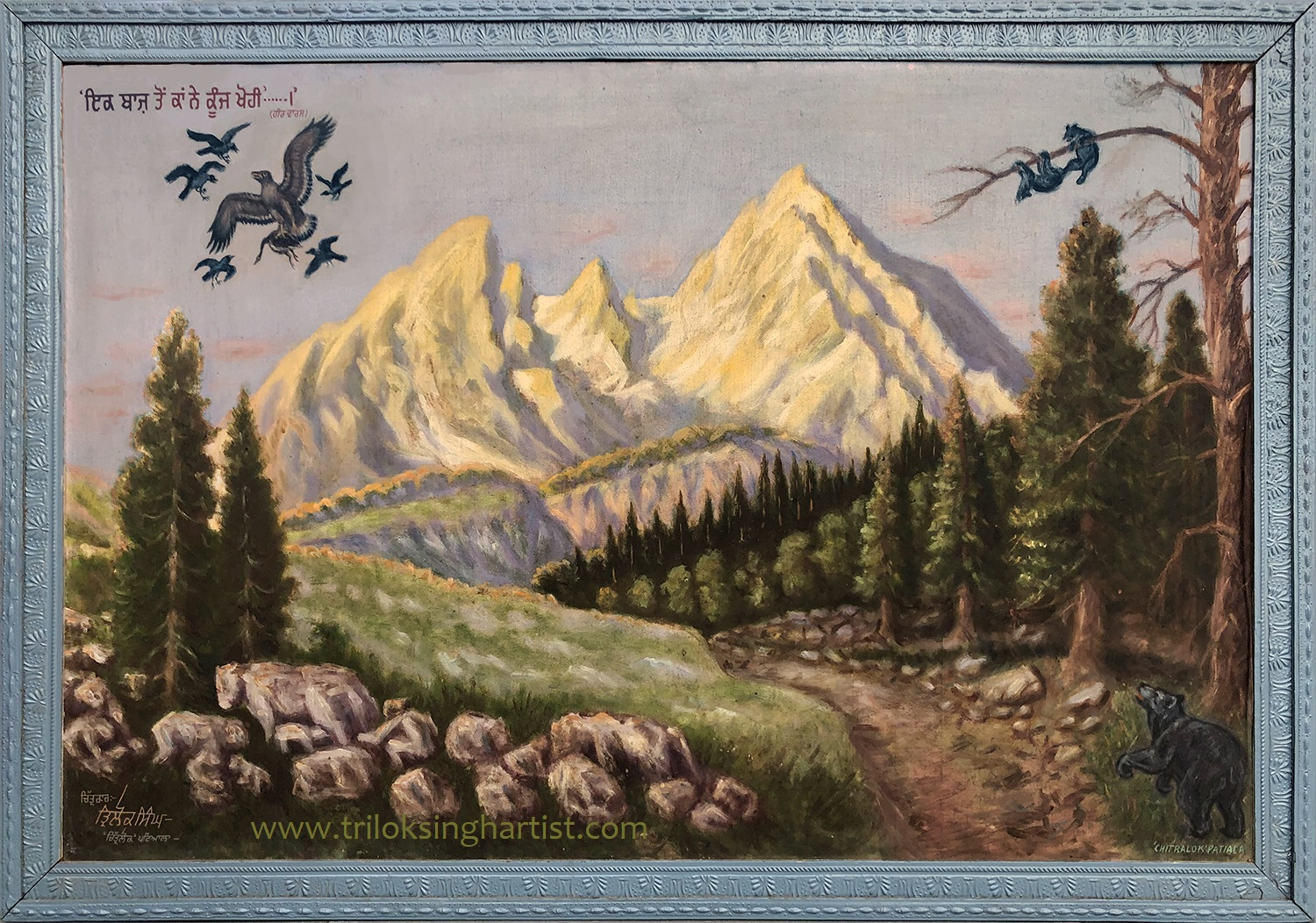
1980s - landscape

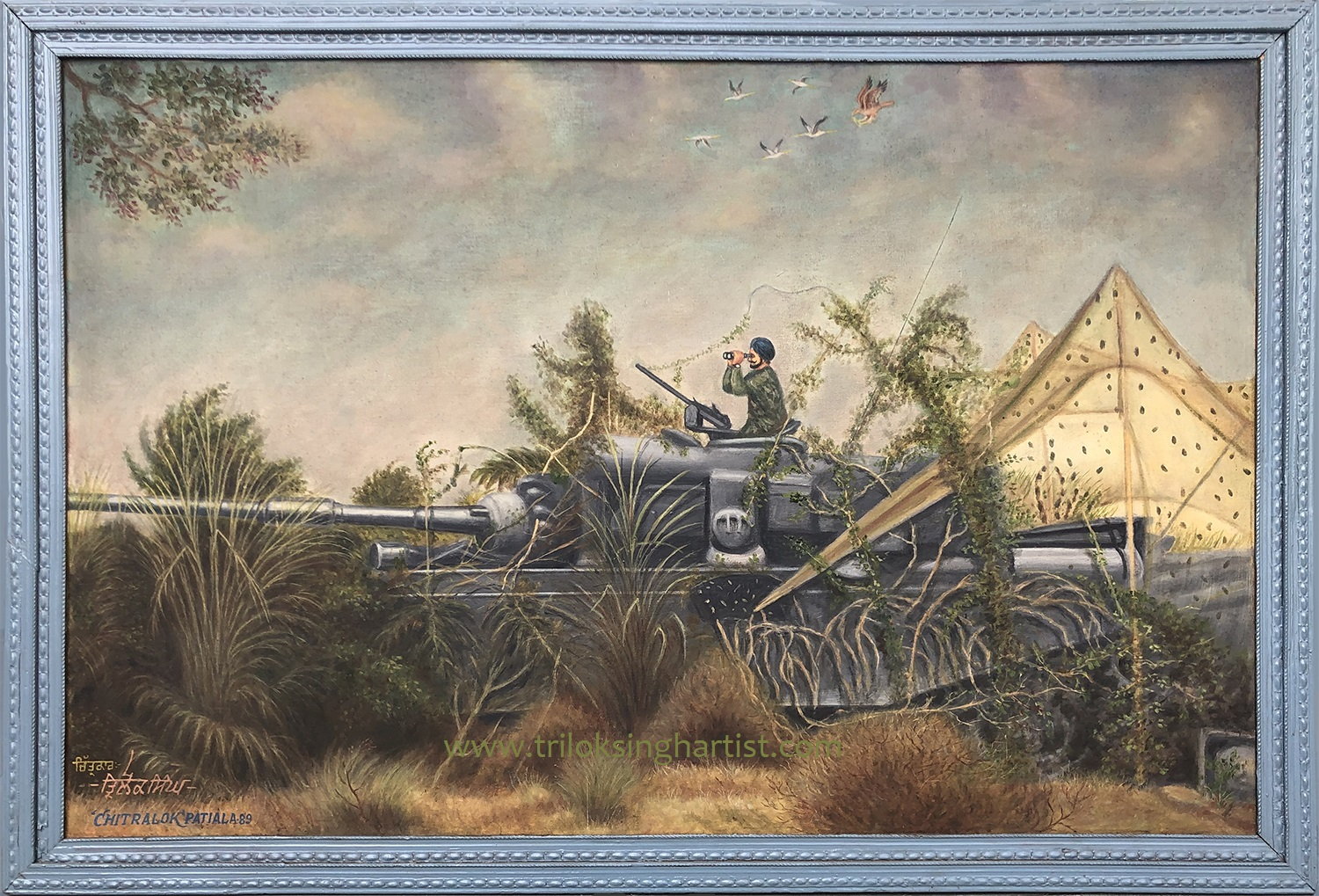
1989- Alishan

Punjabi Encyclopedia - Trilok Singh is the only Artist who made illustrations for Punjabi encyclopedia and published by Languages department, Punjab

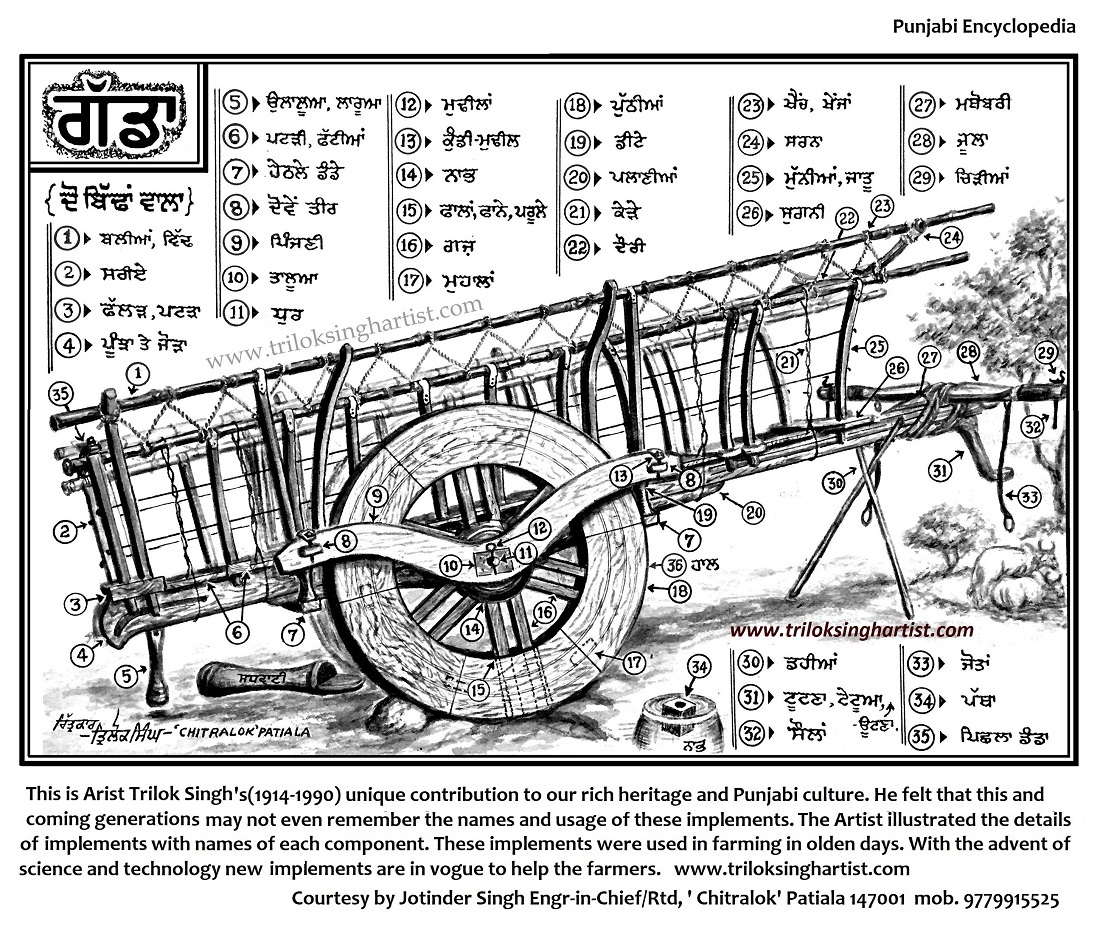
1960s-Bullock cart -Gadda in Punjabi

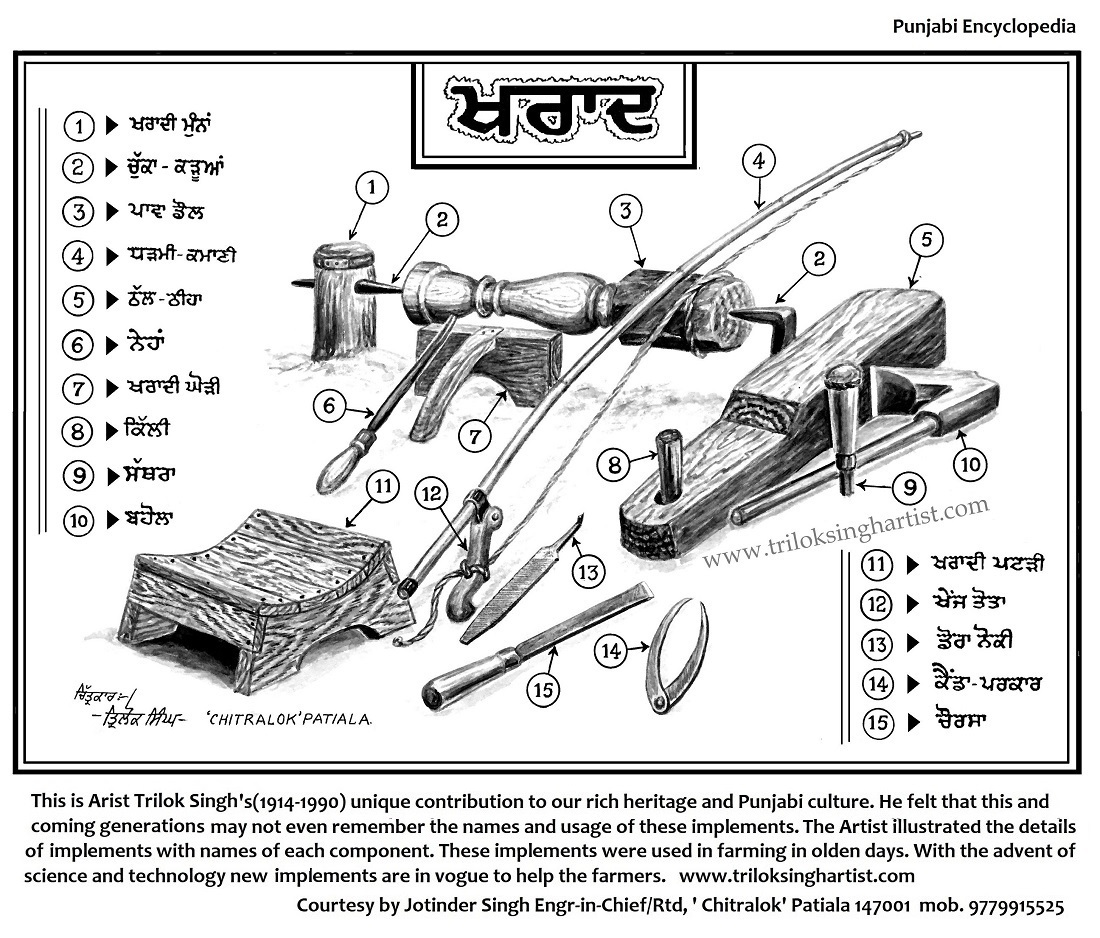
1960s - Carpenter's lathe -Khrad in Punjabi

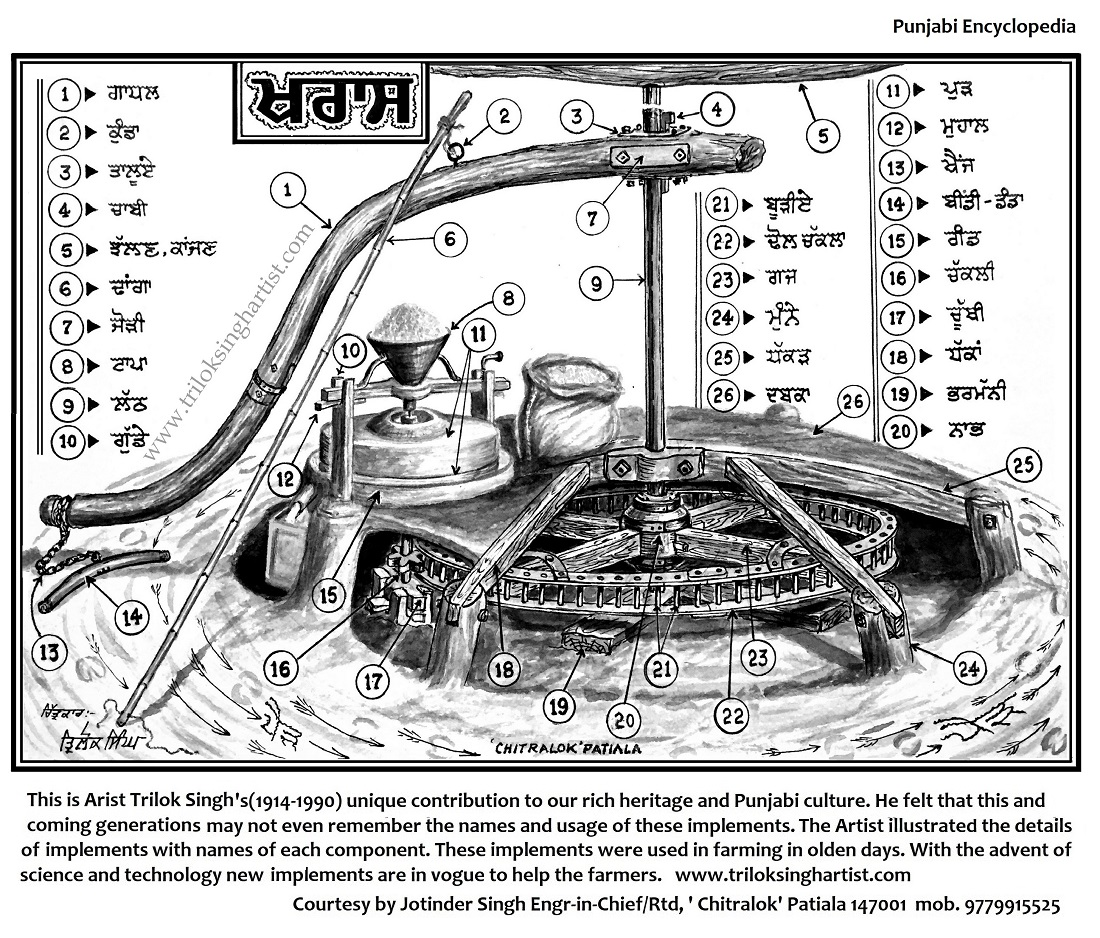
1960s- Stone grinding mill- Khras in Punjabi

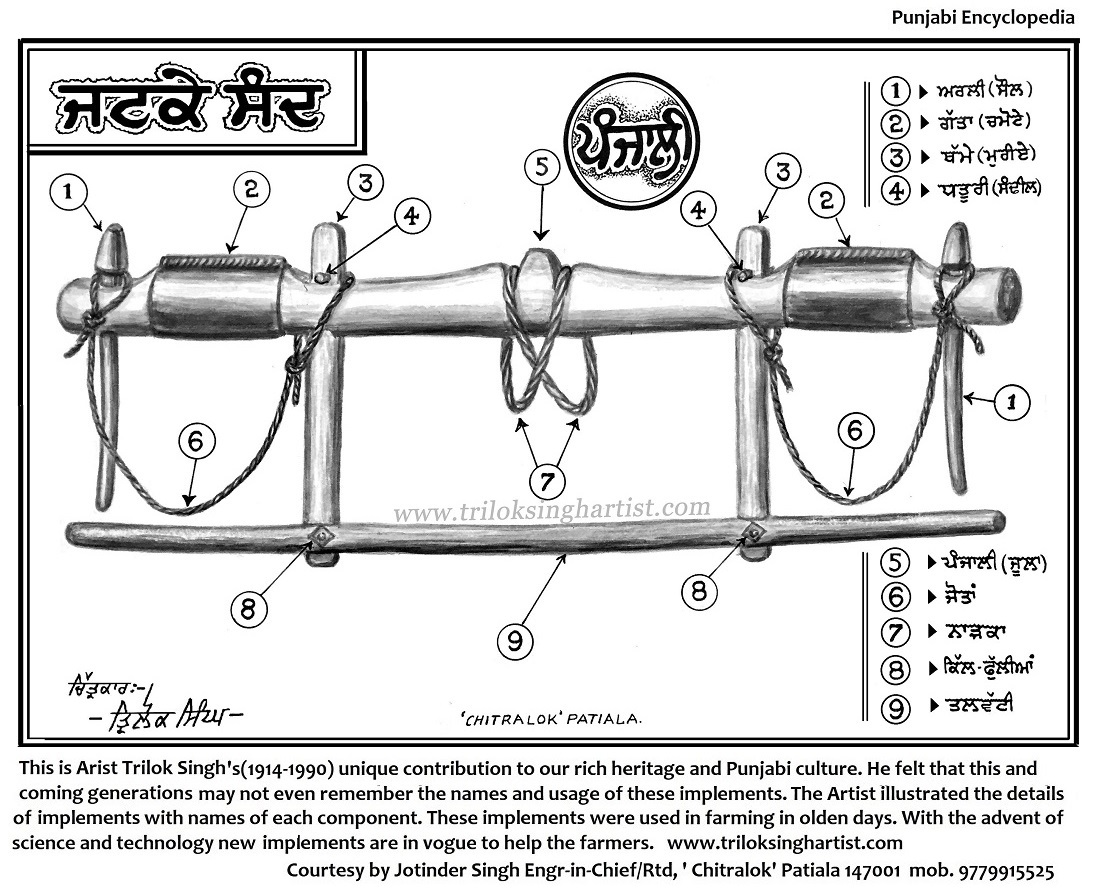
1960s- Panjali-a farm implement for bulls.

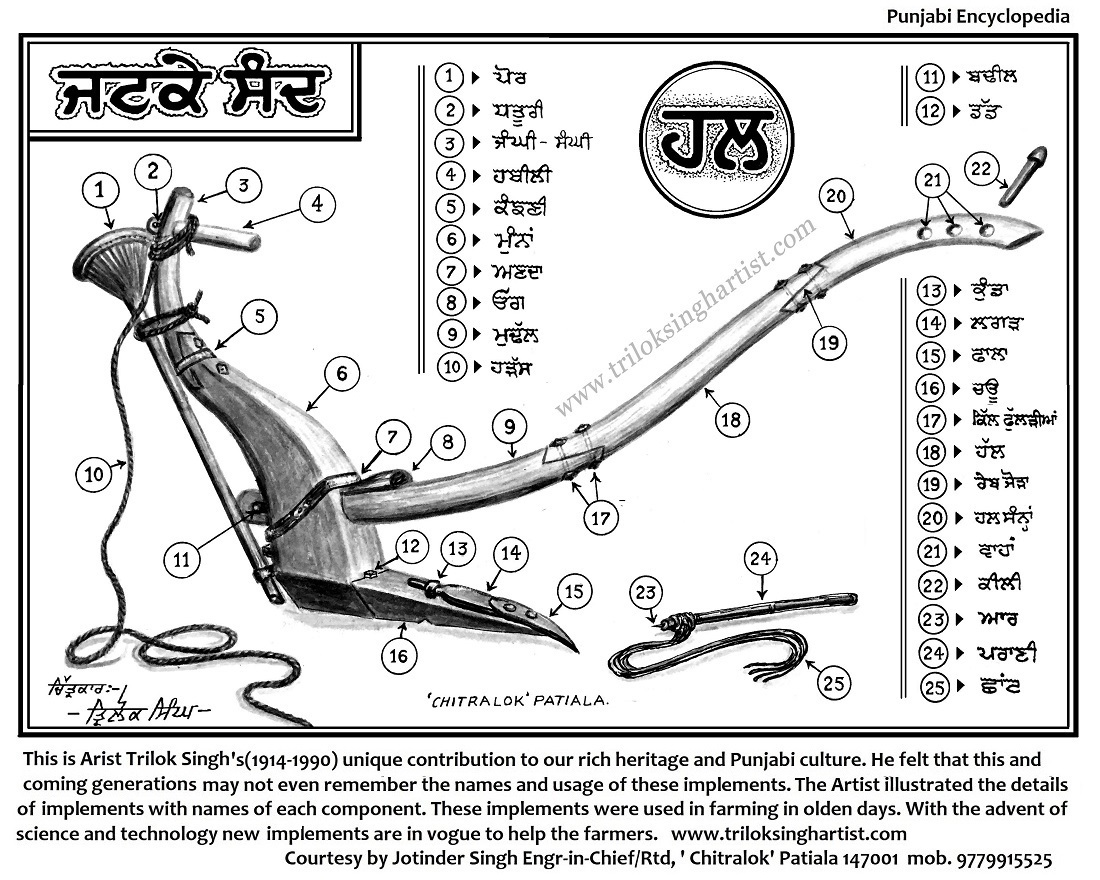
1960s- Farm implement to plough field.

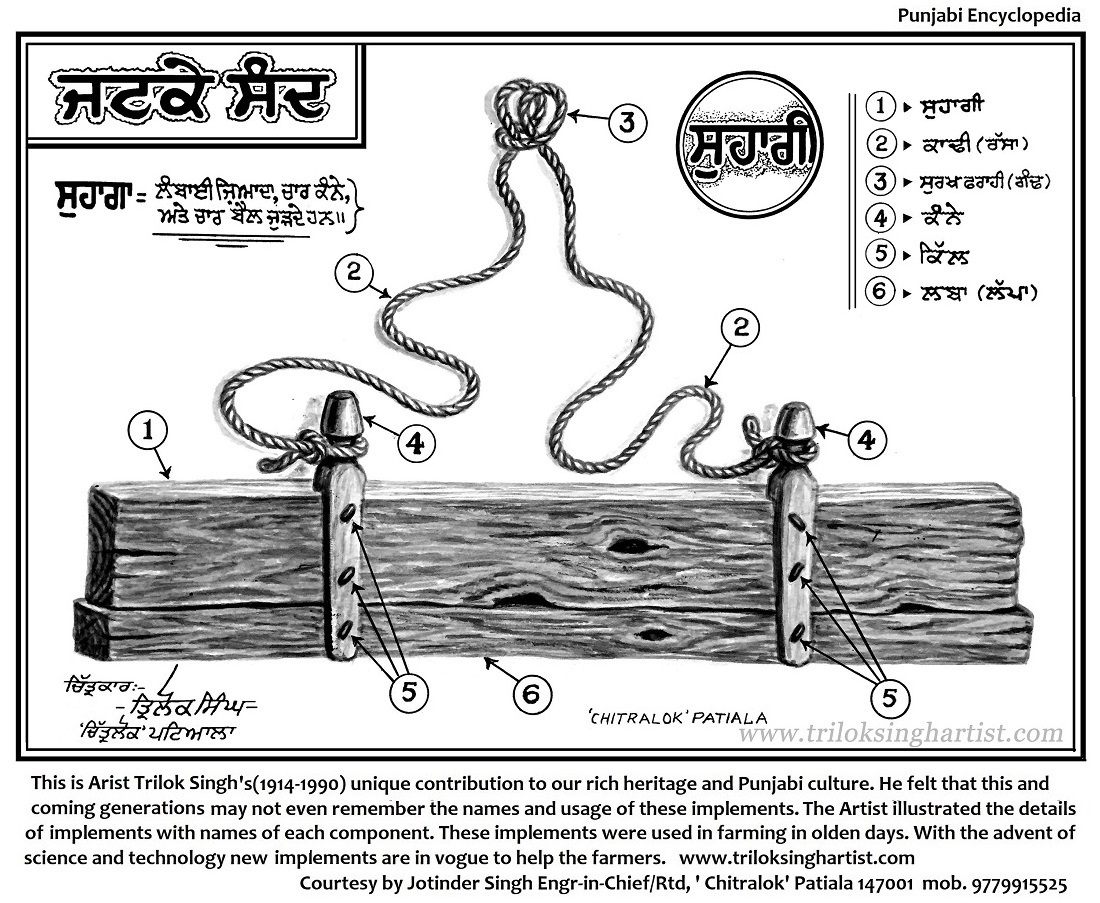
1960s Suhagi-to level field

Punjabi Culture-

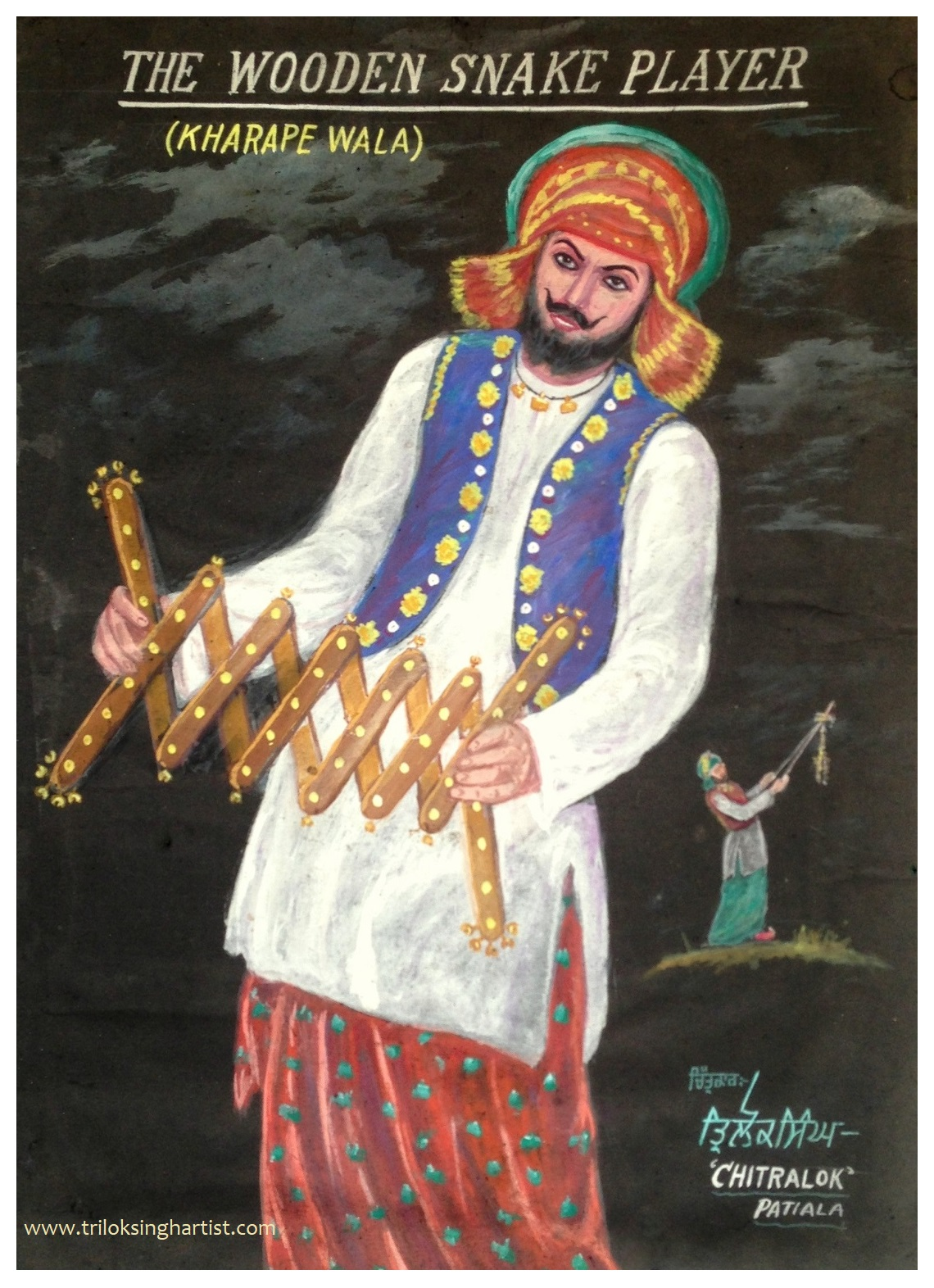
1980s- Kharape wala

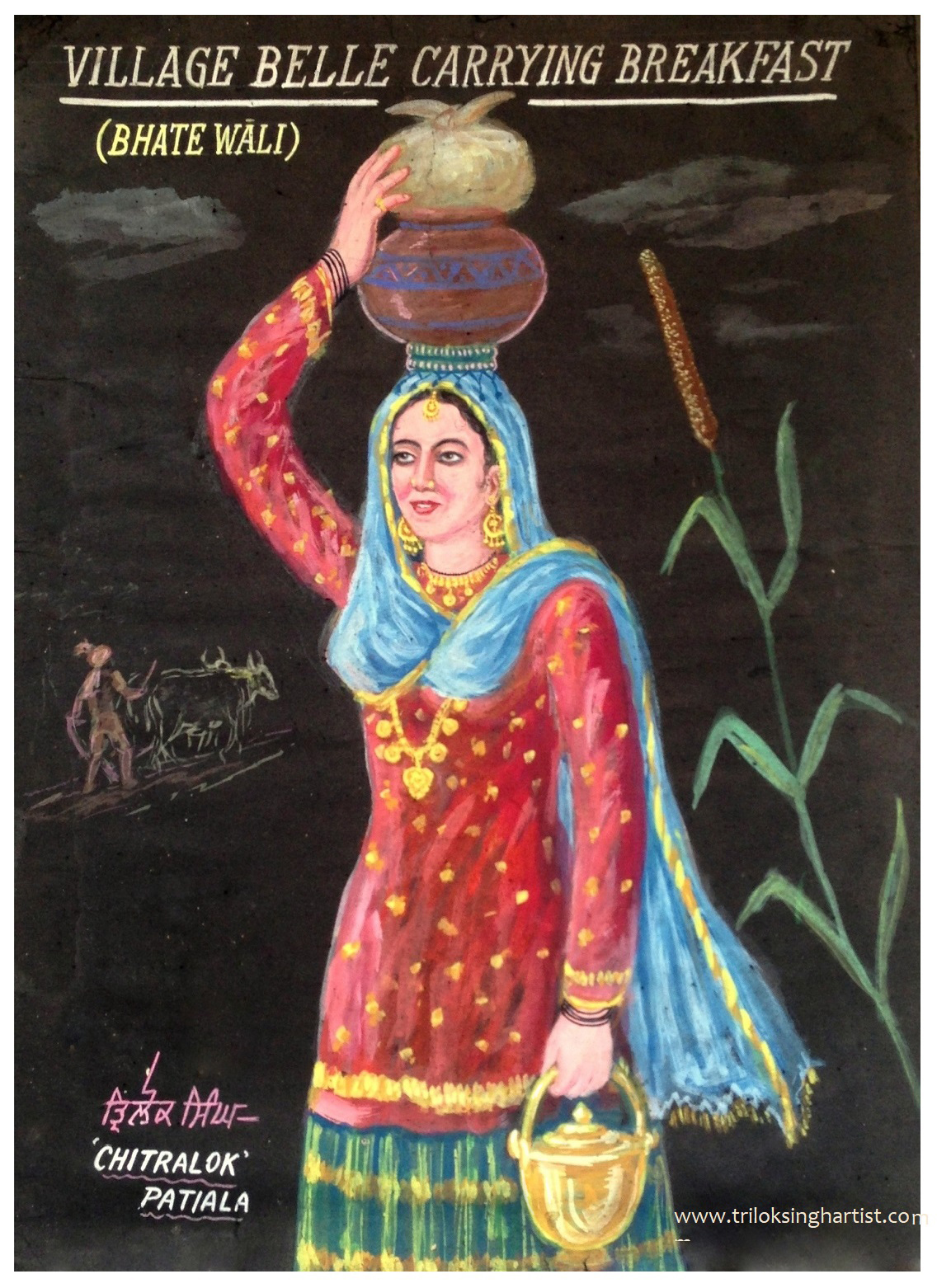
1980s- Bhatewali

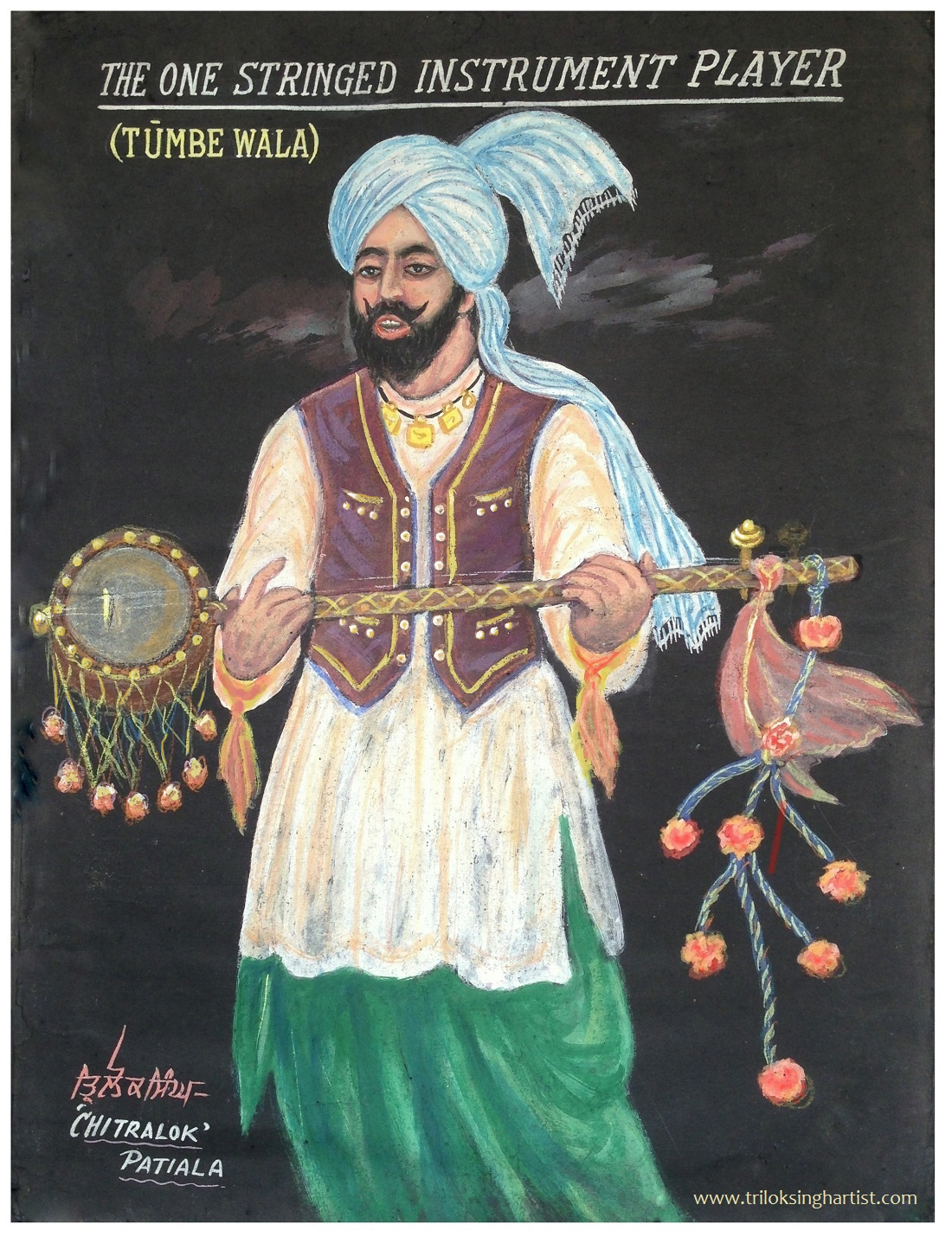
1980s- Tumbe wala

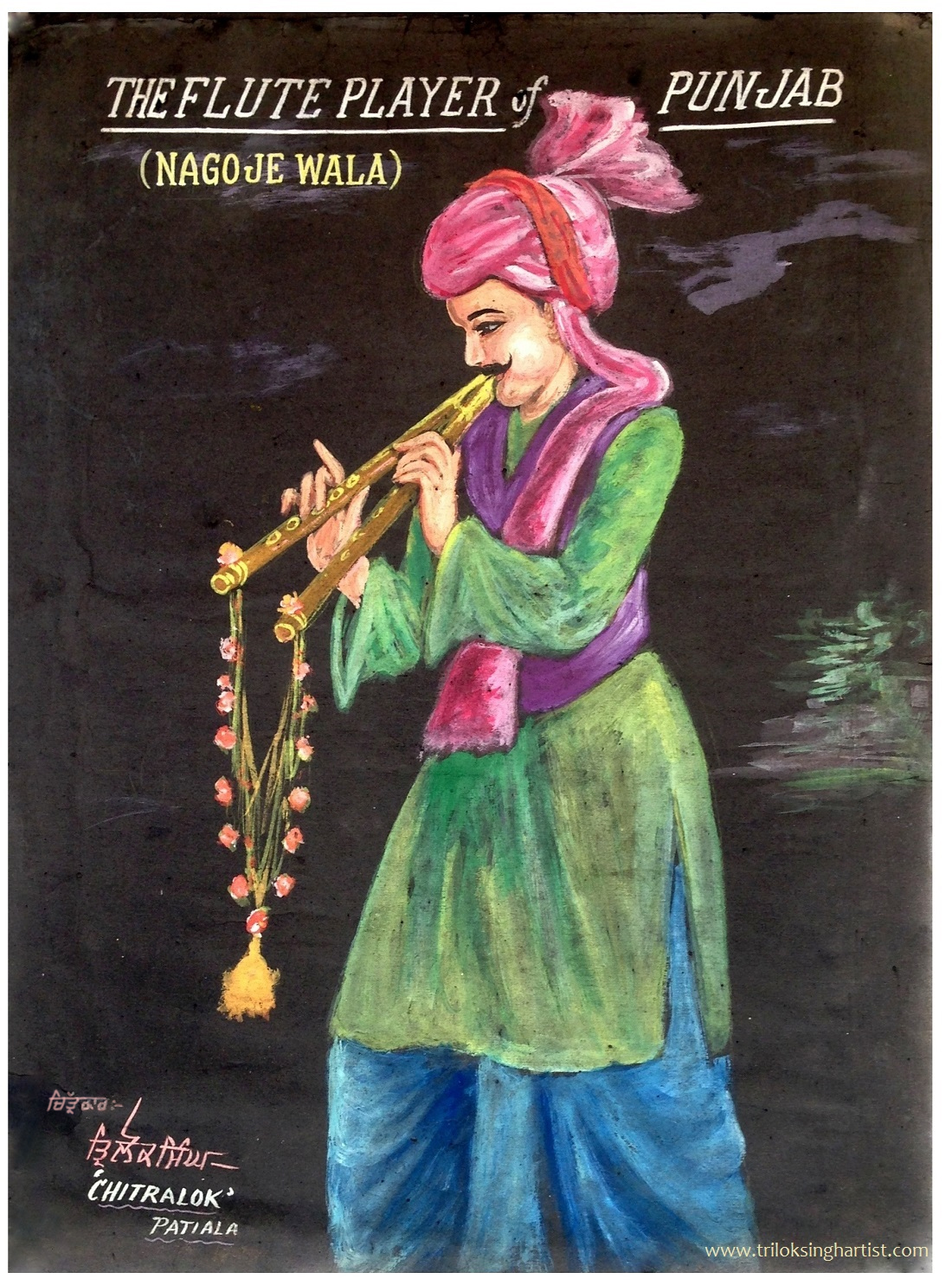
1980s- Nagoje wala

Development of Gurmukhi (Punjabi) script from 375 AD

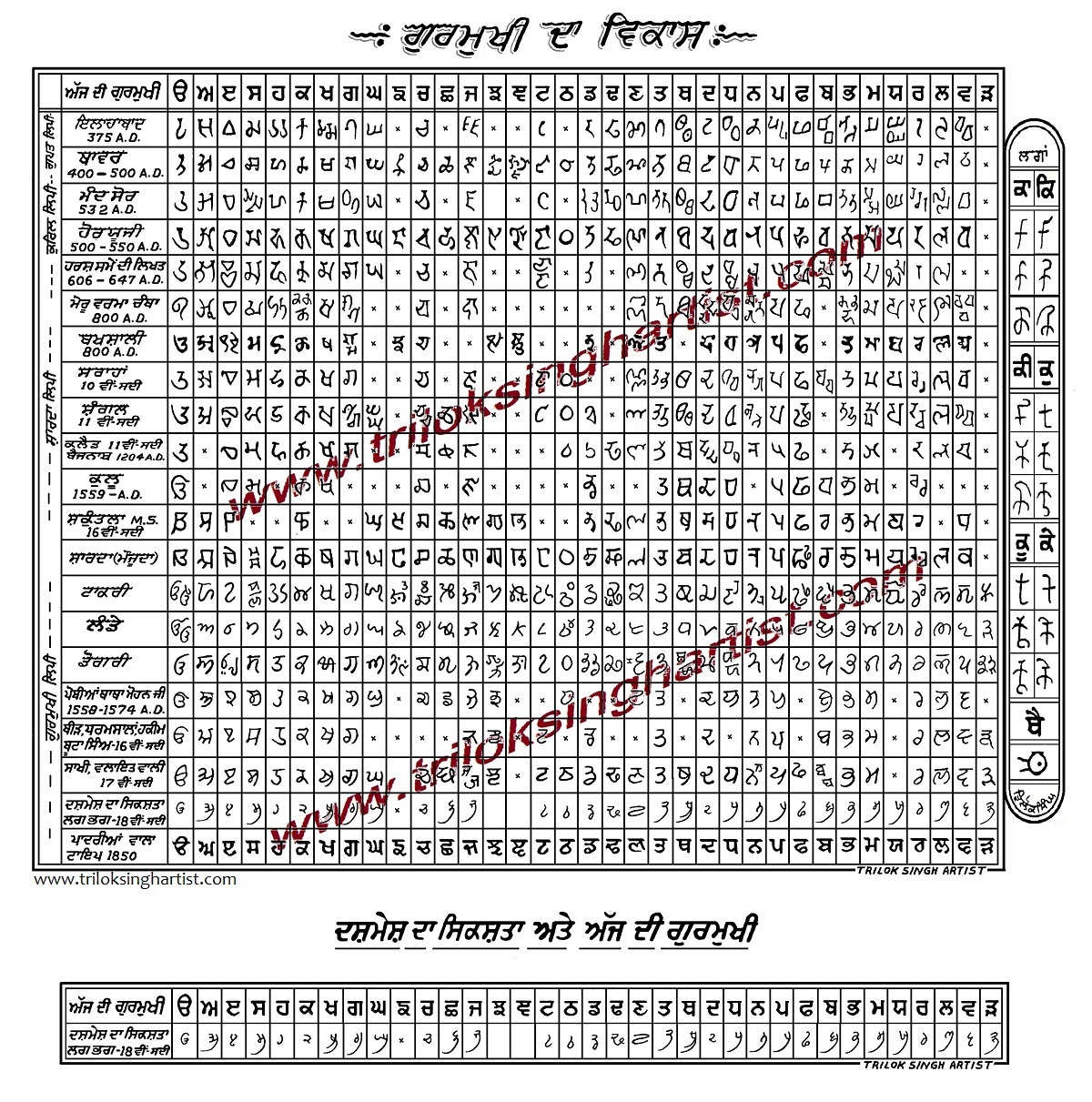
Development of Gurmukhi

Poetry

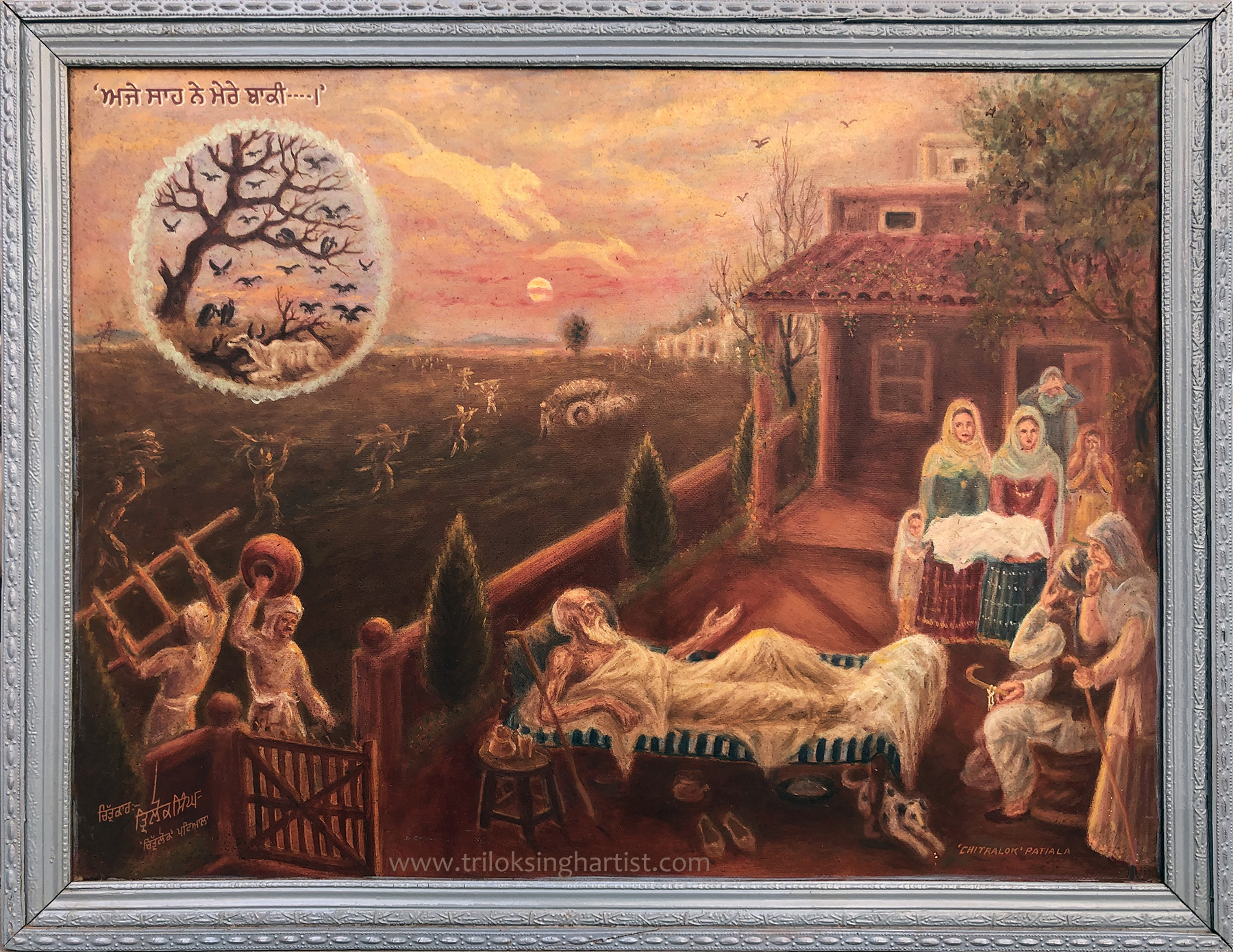
1980s- ਅਜੇ ਸਾਹ ਨੇ ਮੇਰੇ ਬਾਕੀ।..

Paintings based on Gurbani-

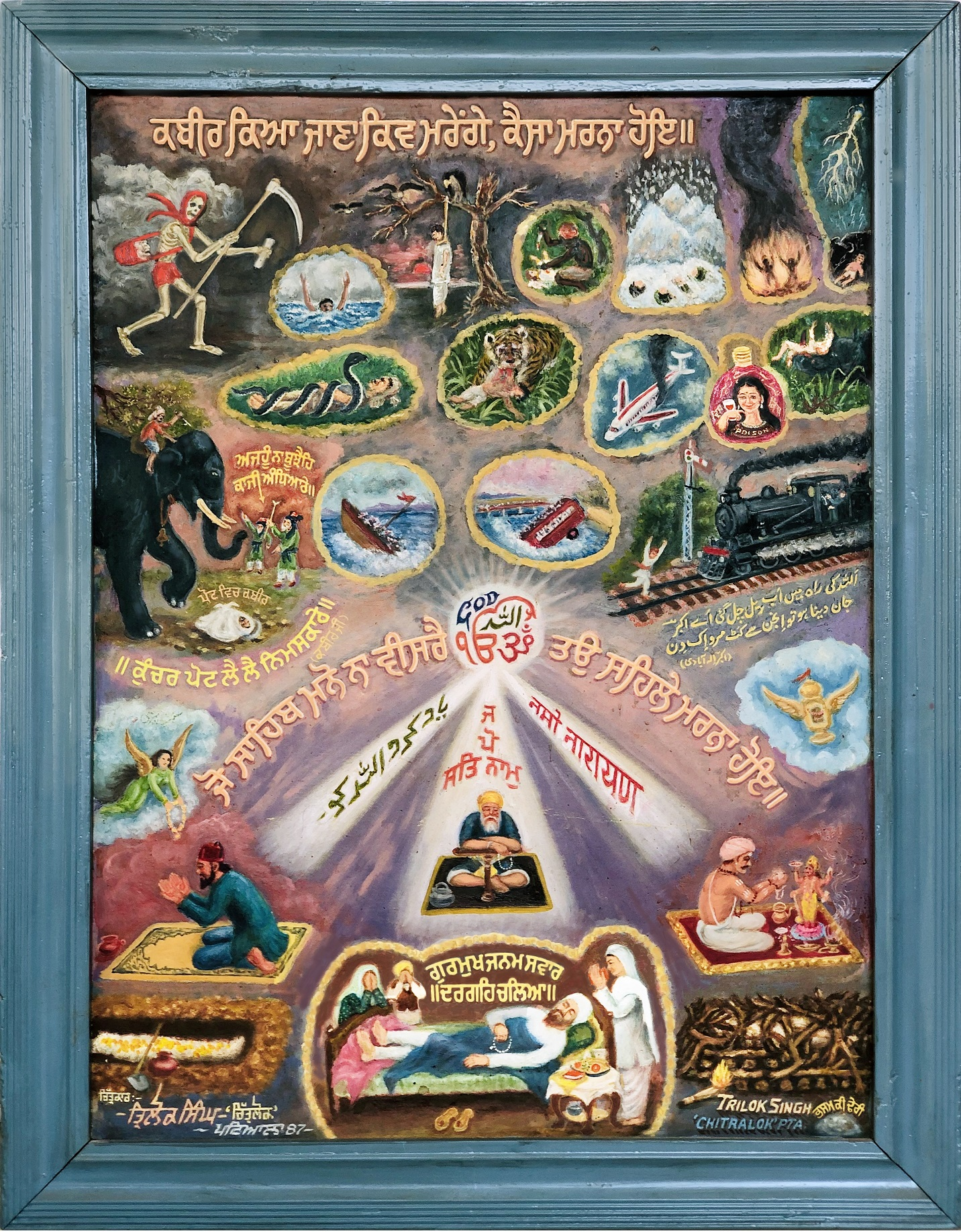
1987- Bhagat Kabir bani

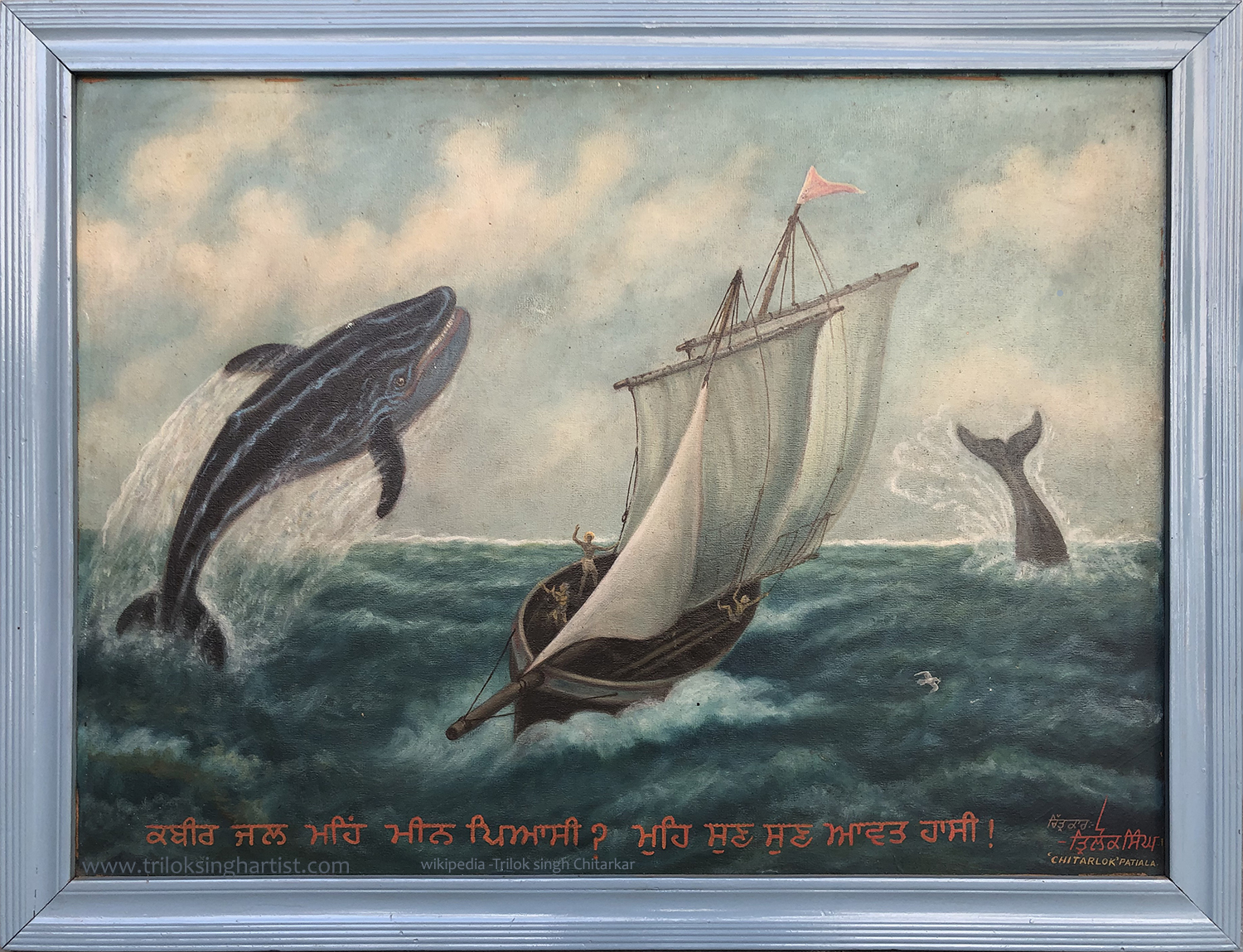
1970s- Jaal meh meen

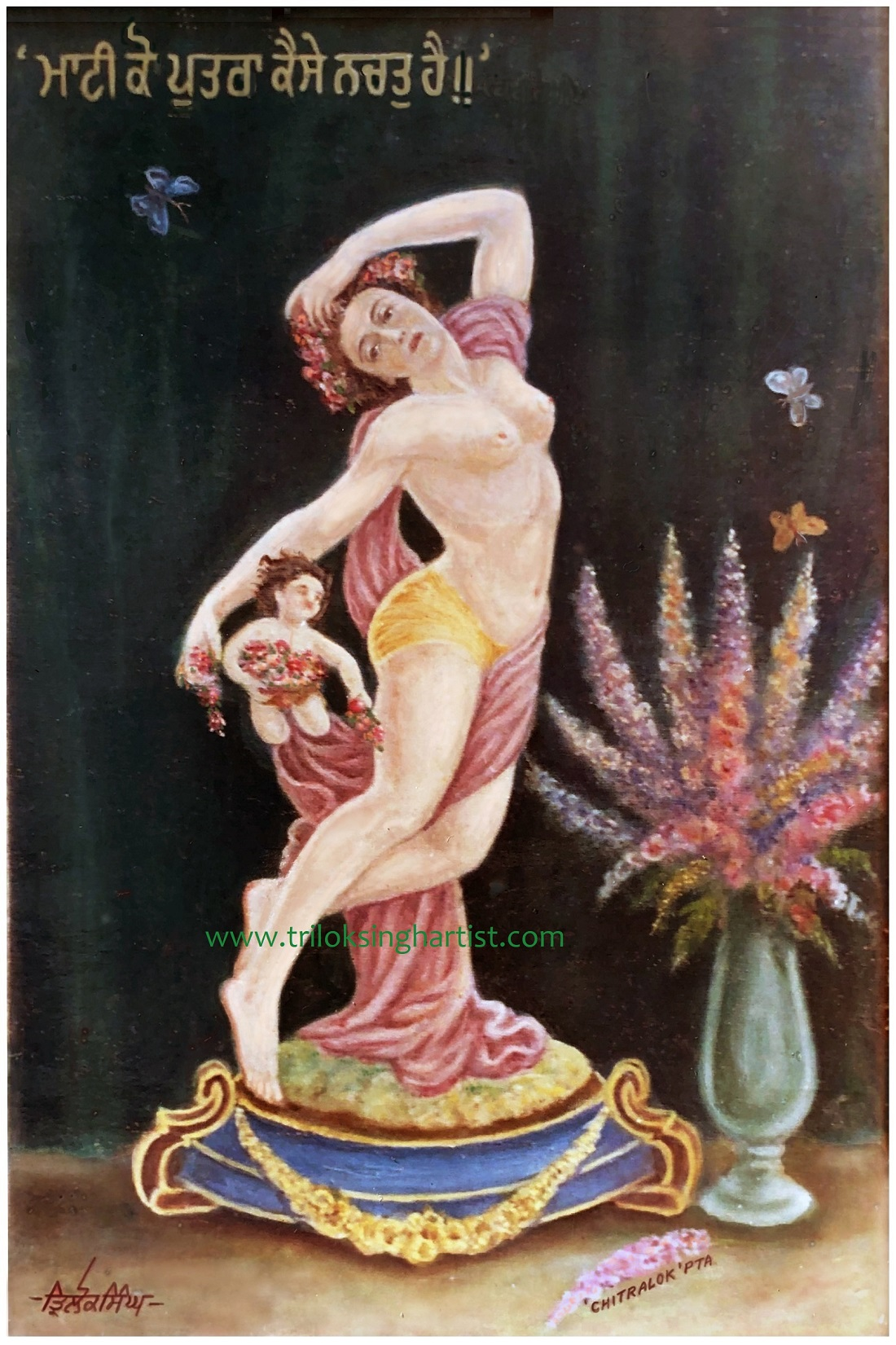
1959- Maati Ko Putra

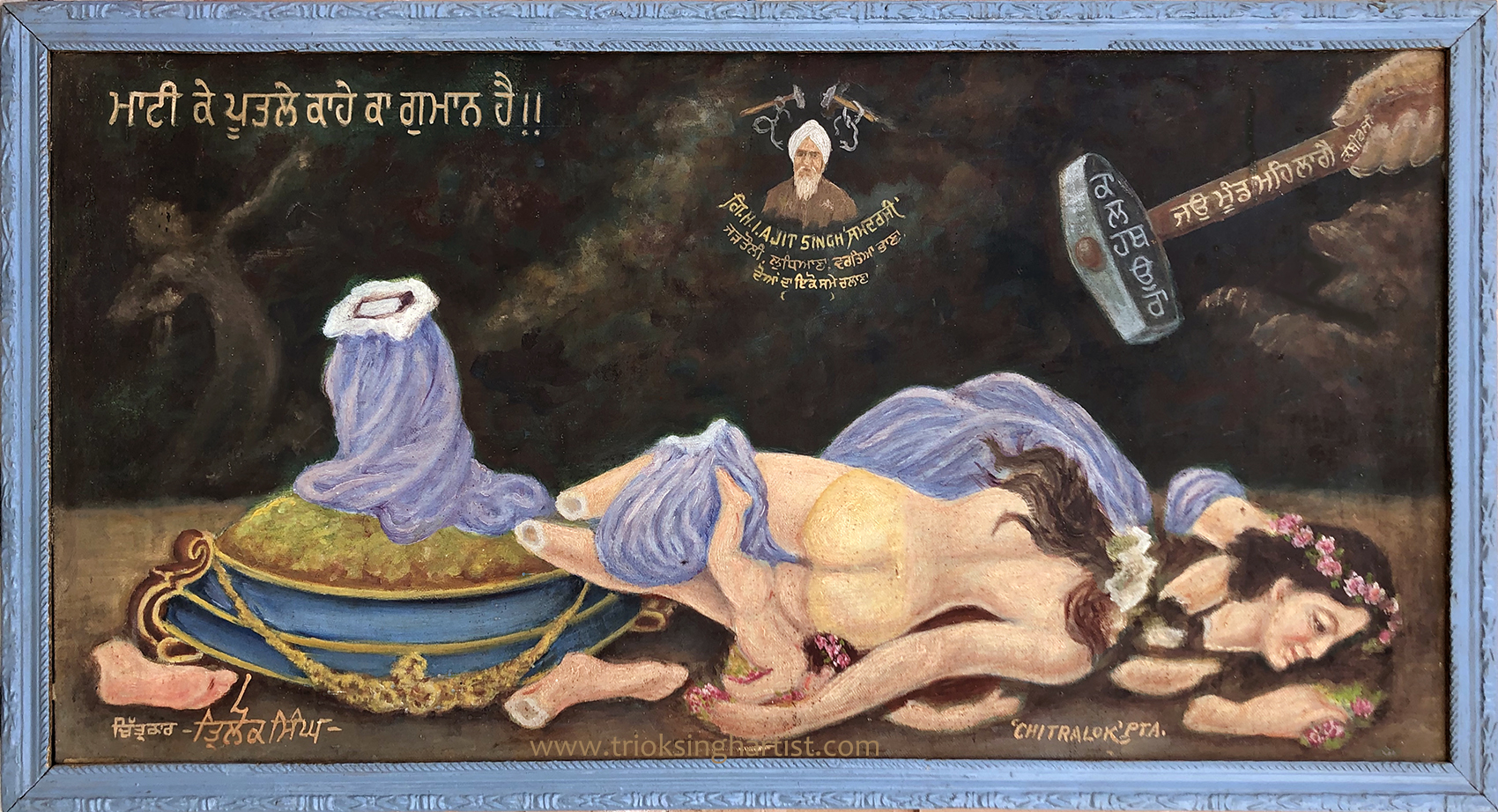
1980s - Hammer of death

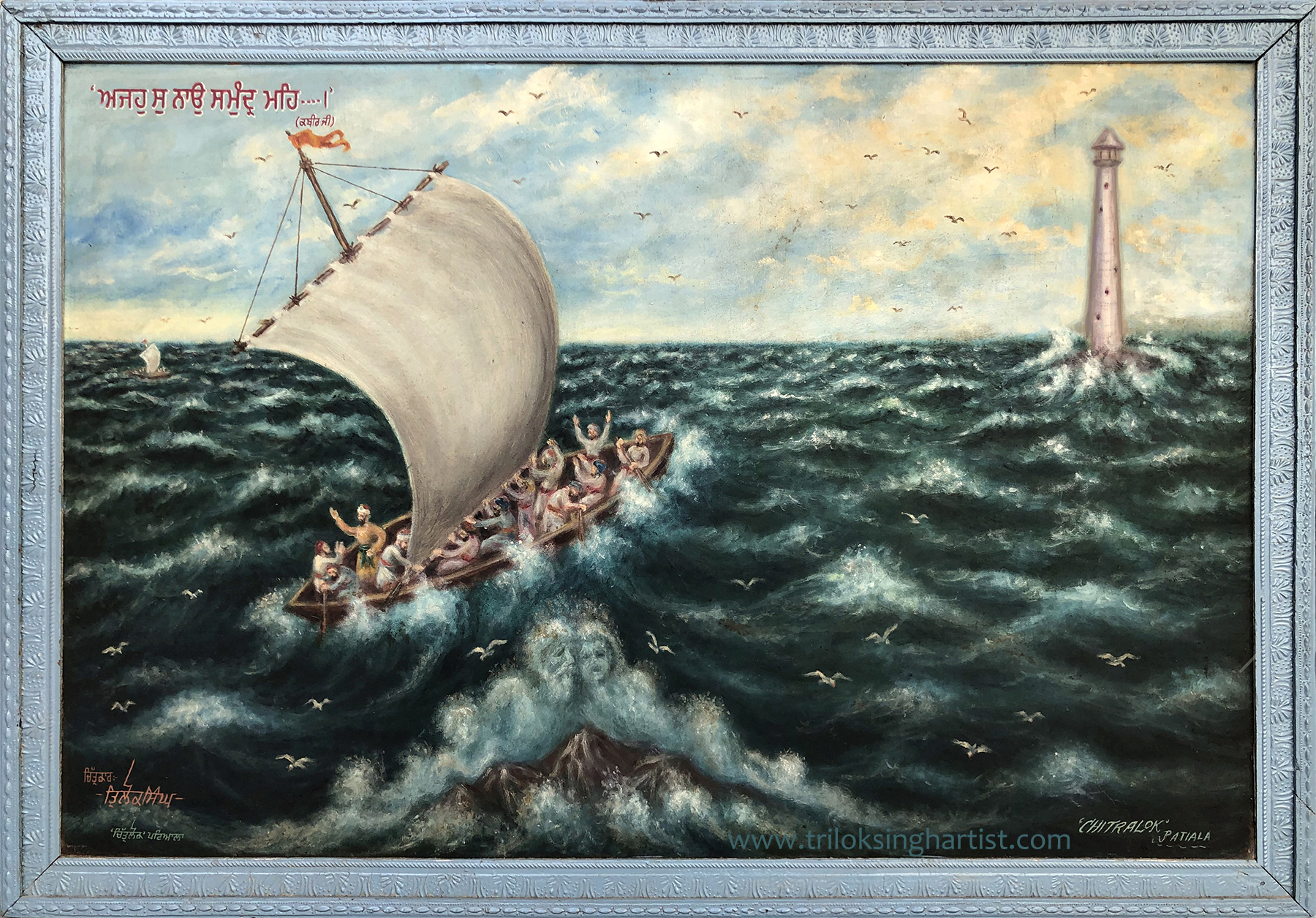
1980s-ਅਜਹੁ ਸੁ ਨਾਉ ਸਮੁੰਦ੍ਰ ਮਹਿ

Portraits

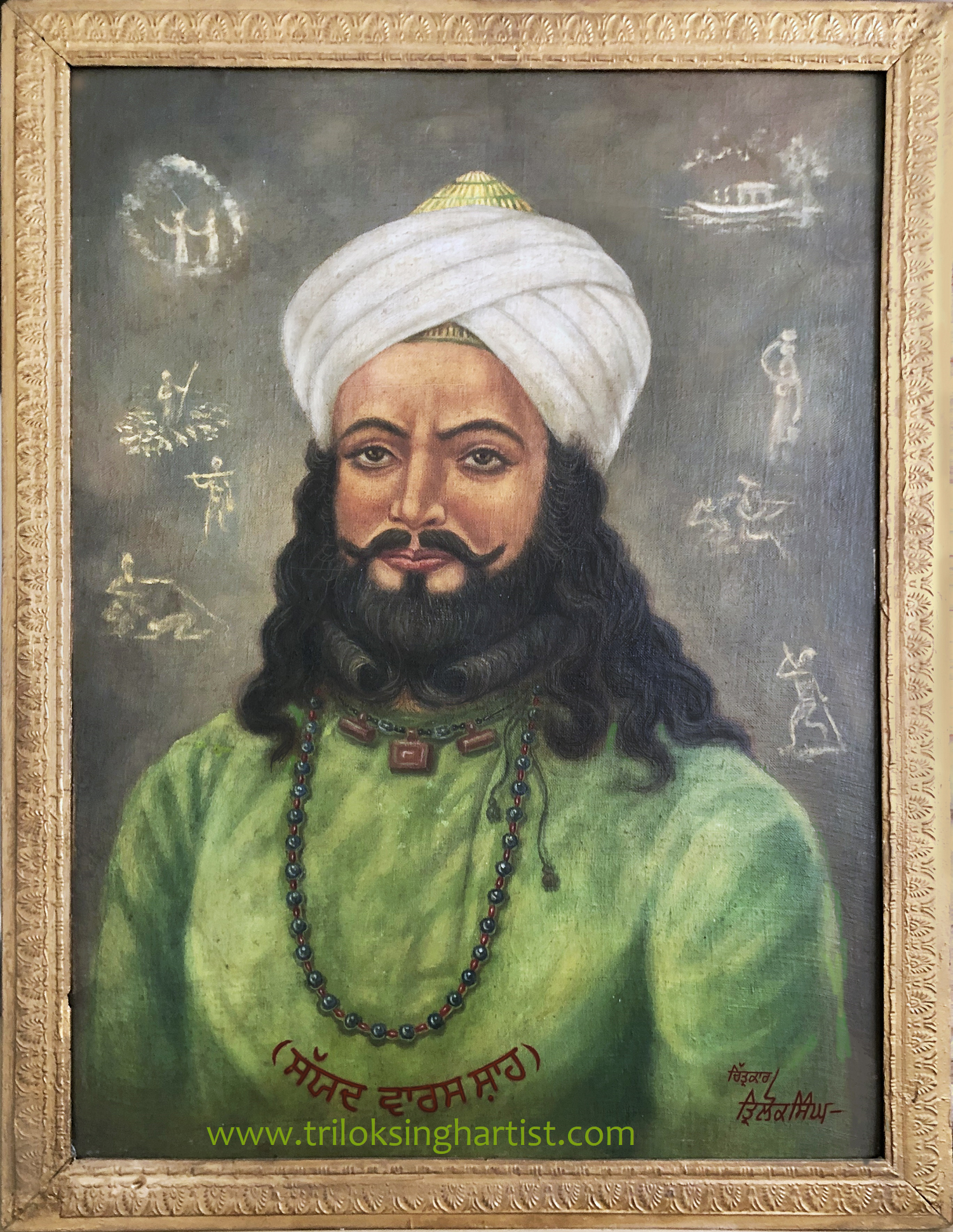
1956 - Sayyid Waris Shah

Historical-

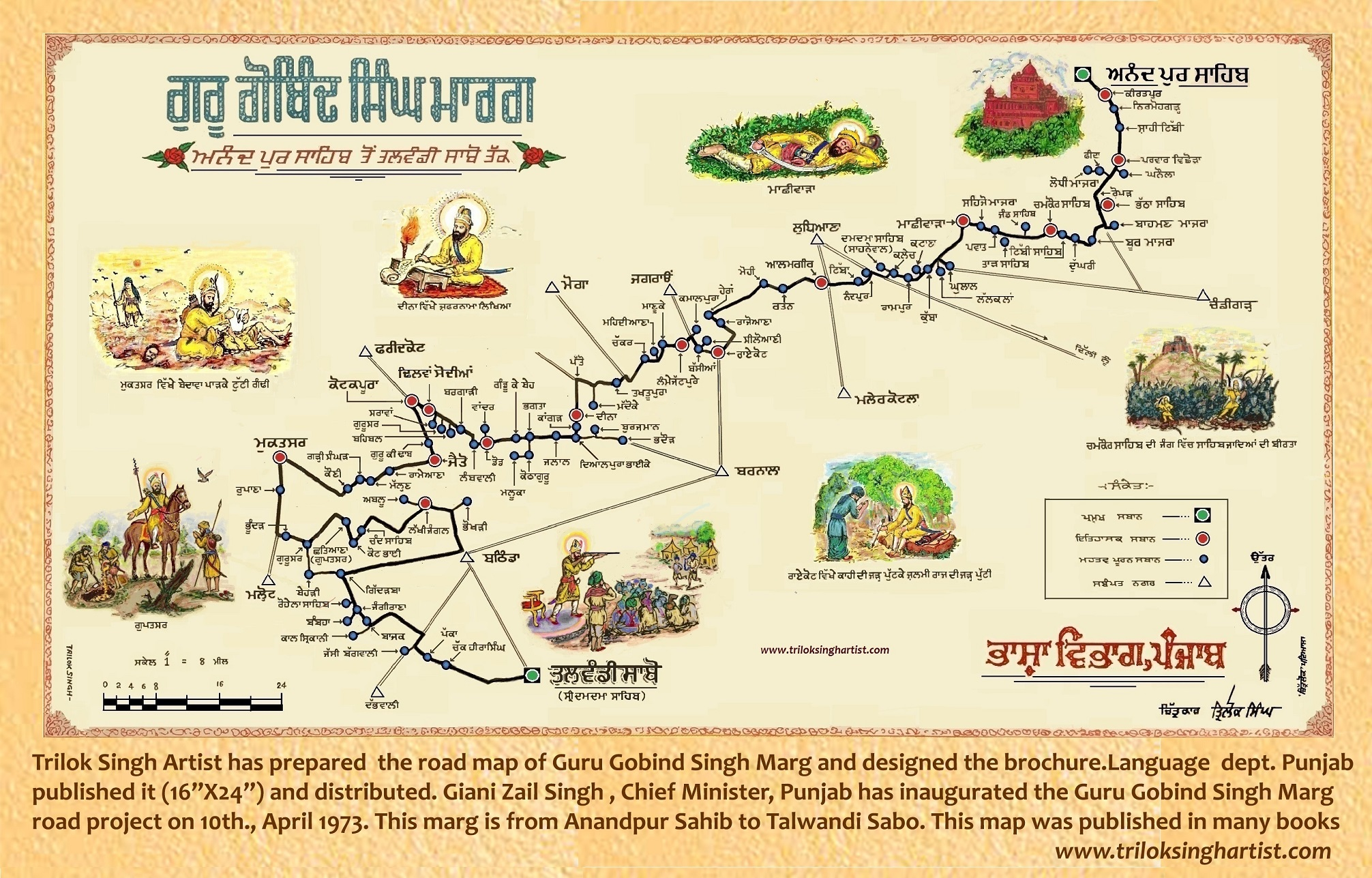
1966 - Guru Gobind Singh Marg

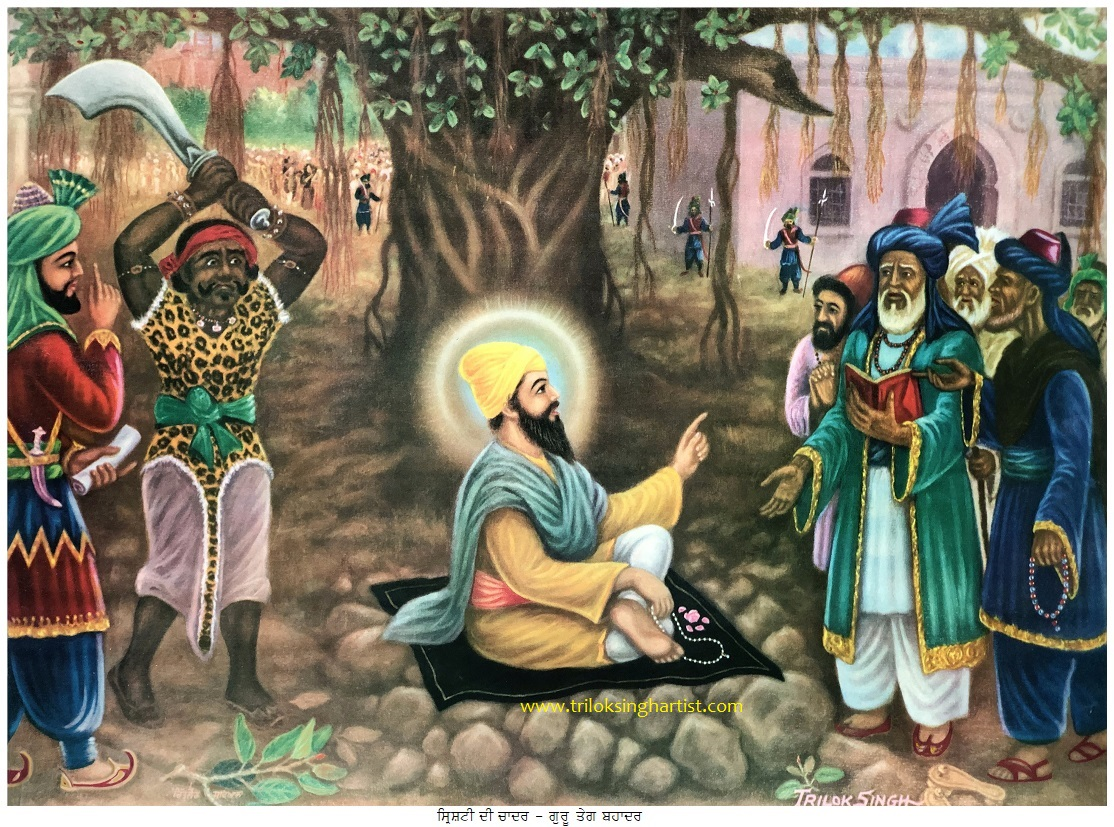
1960s- Guru Teg Bahadur Sharishti-De-Chadar

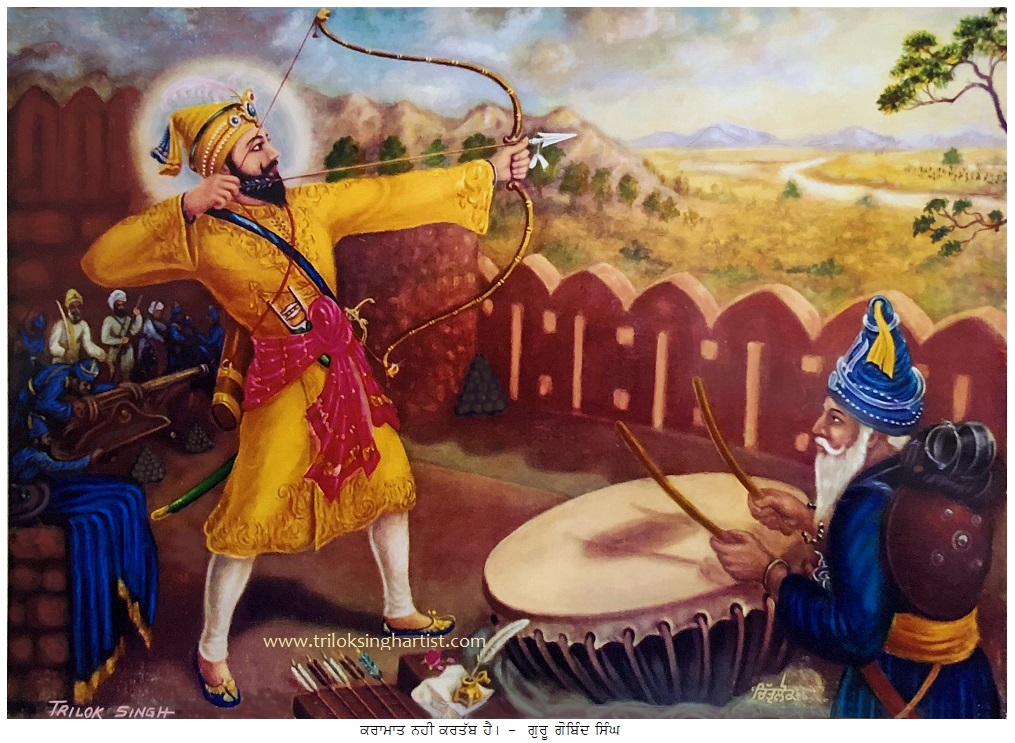
1960s- Practice only- Guru Gobind Singh

Punjabi alphabets - comparative Hindi and Bengali alphabets

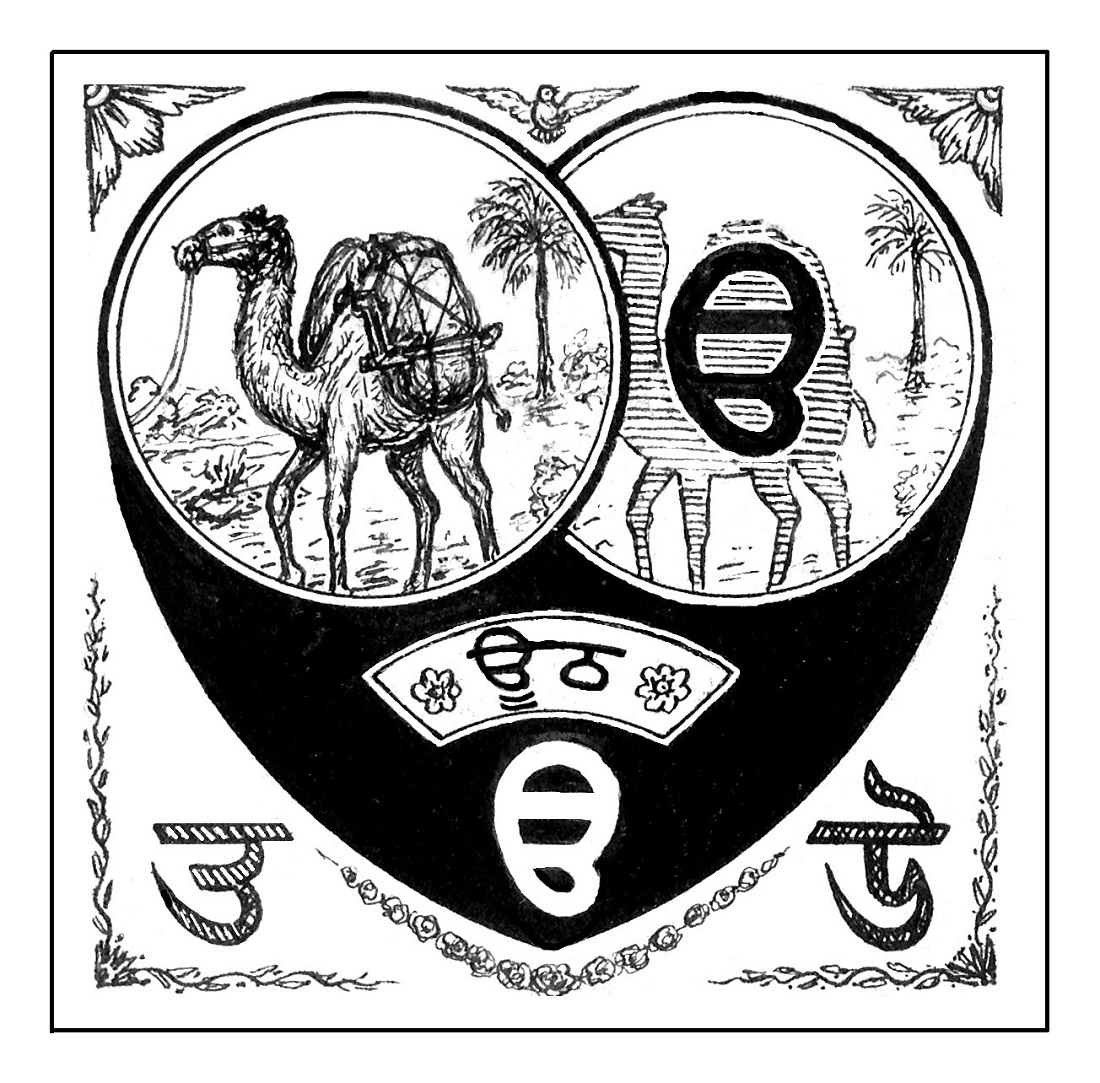
1960s- Punjabi +Hindi +Bengali

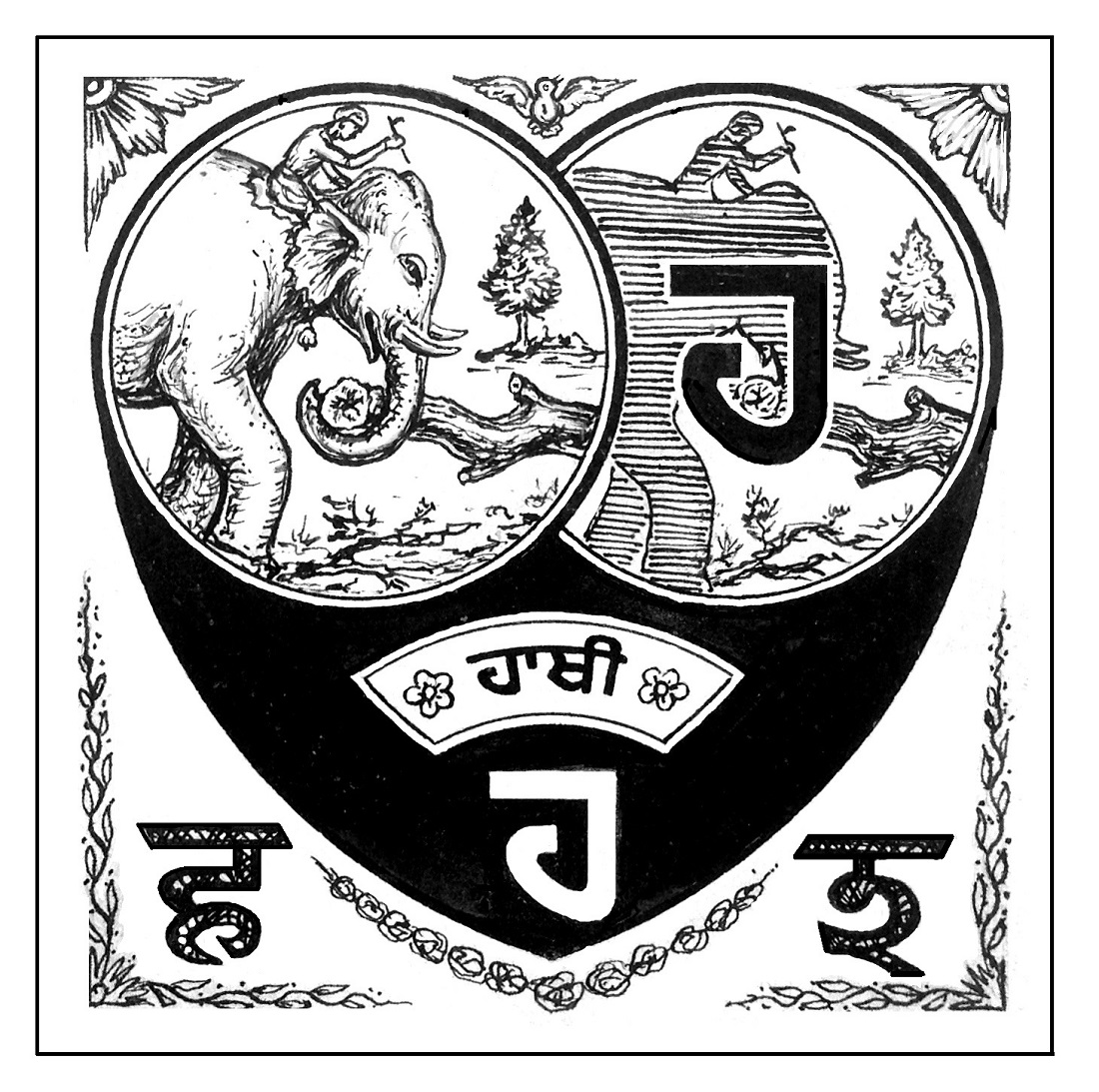
1960s- Punjabi +Hindi +Bengali

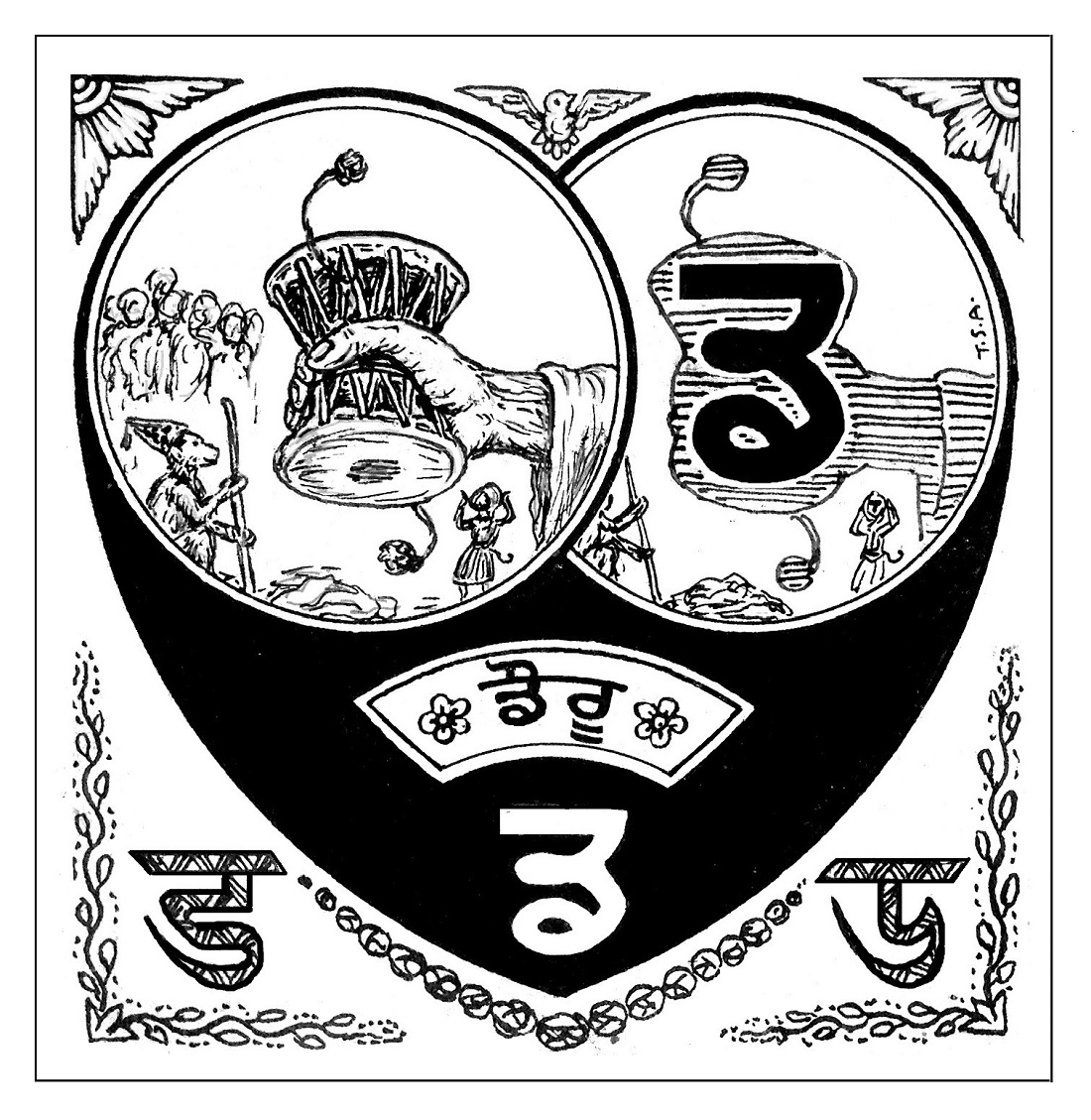
1960s- Punjabi +Hindi +Bengali

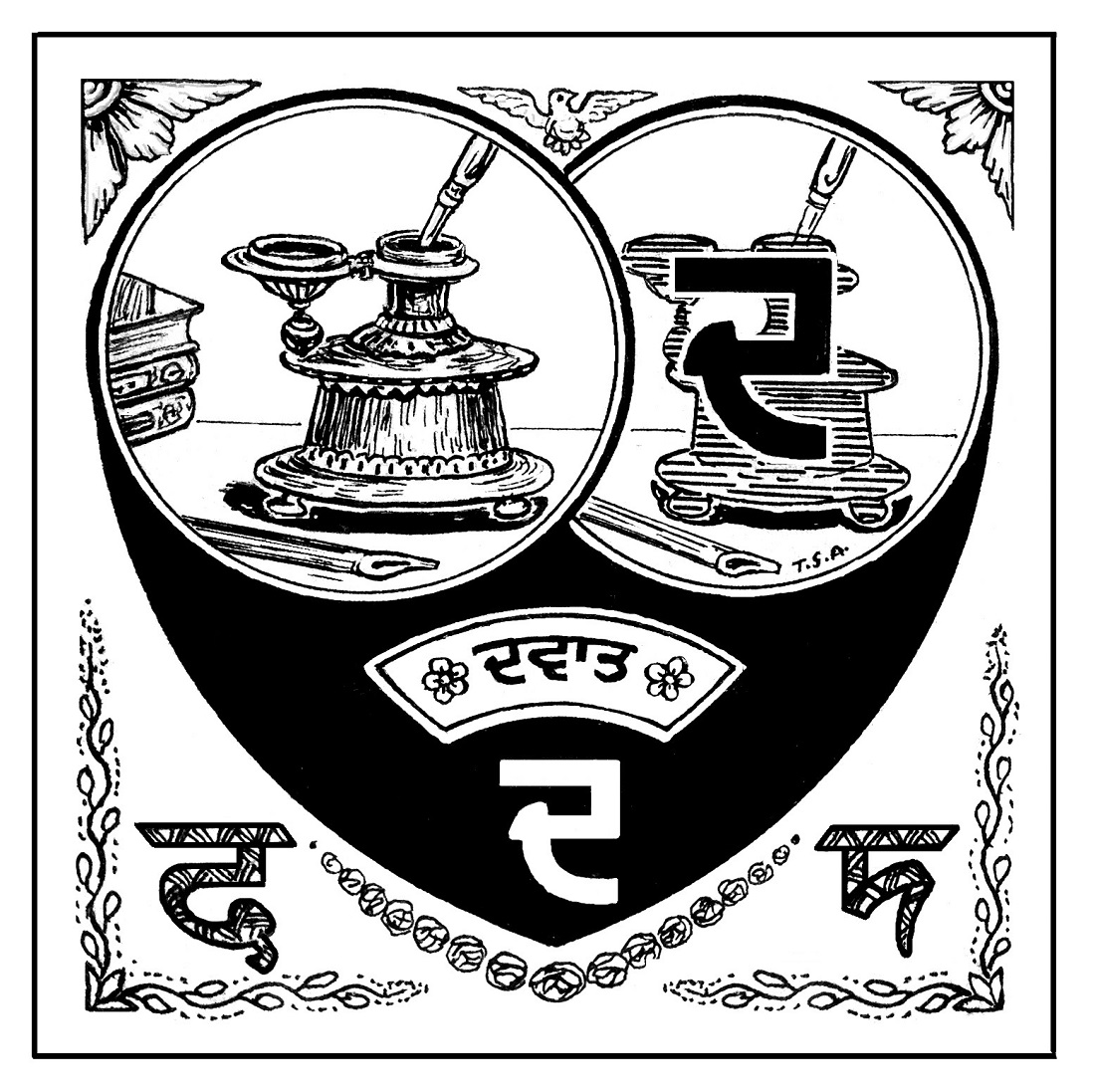
1960s- Punjabi +Hindi + Bengali

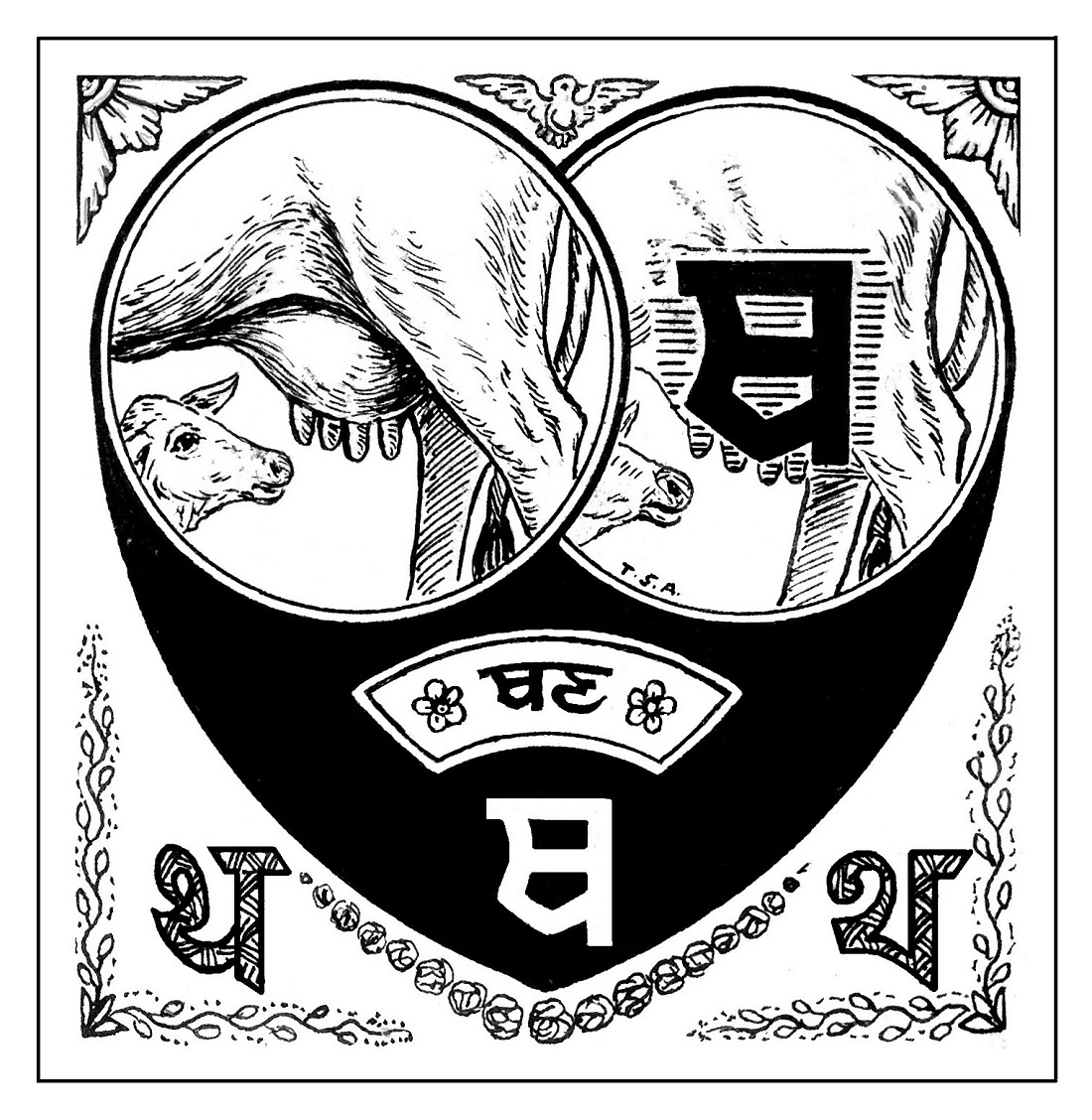
1960s- Punjabi +Hindi +Bengali

Contribution to Hindi

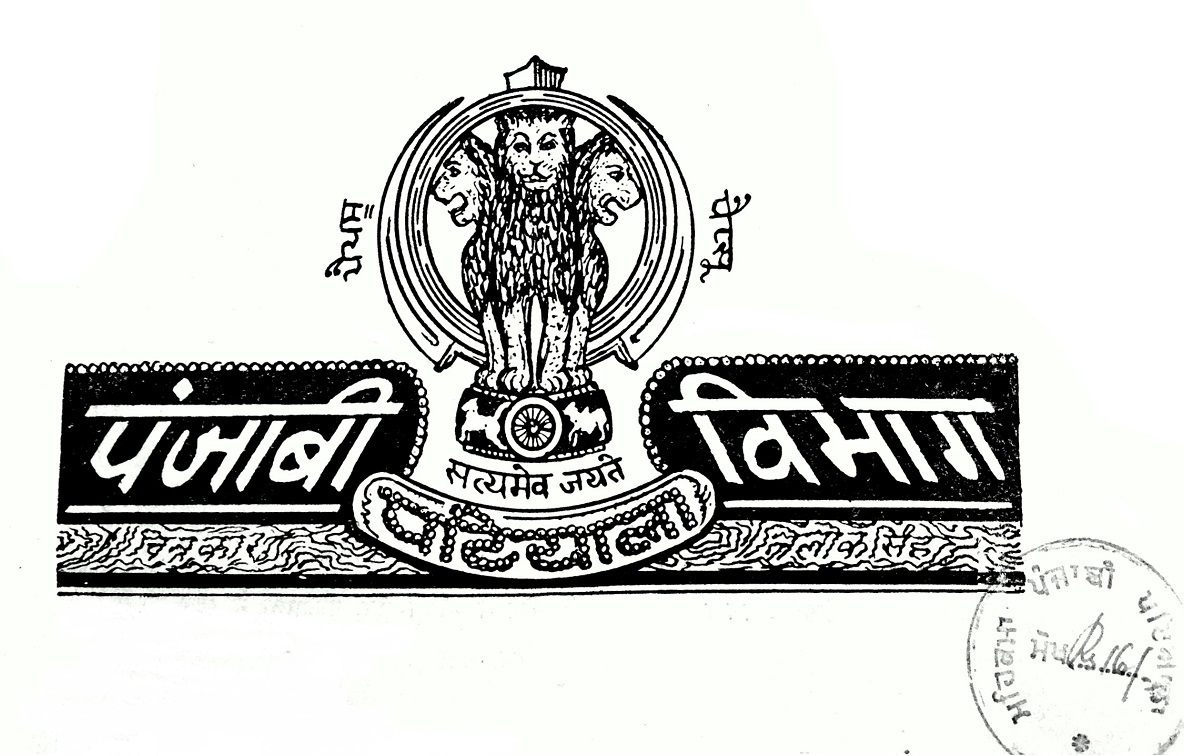
1955- Punjabi Department, PEPSU

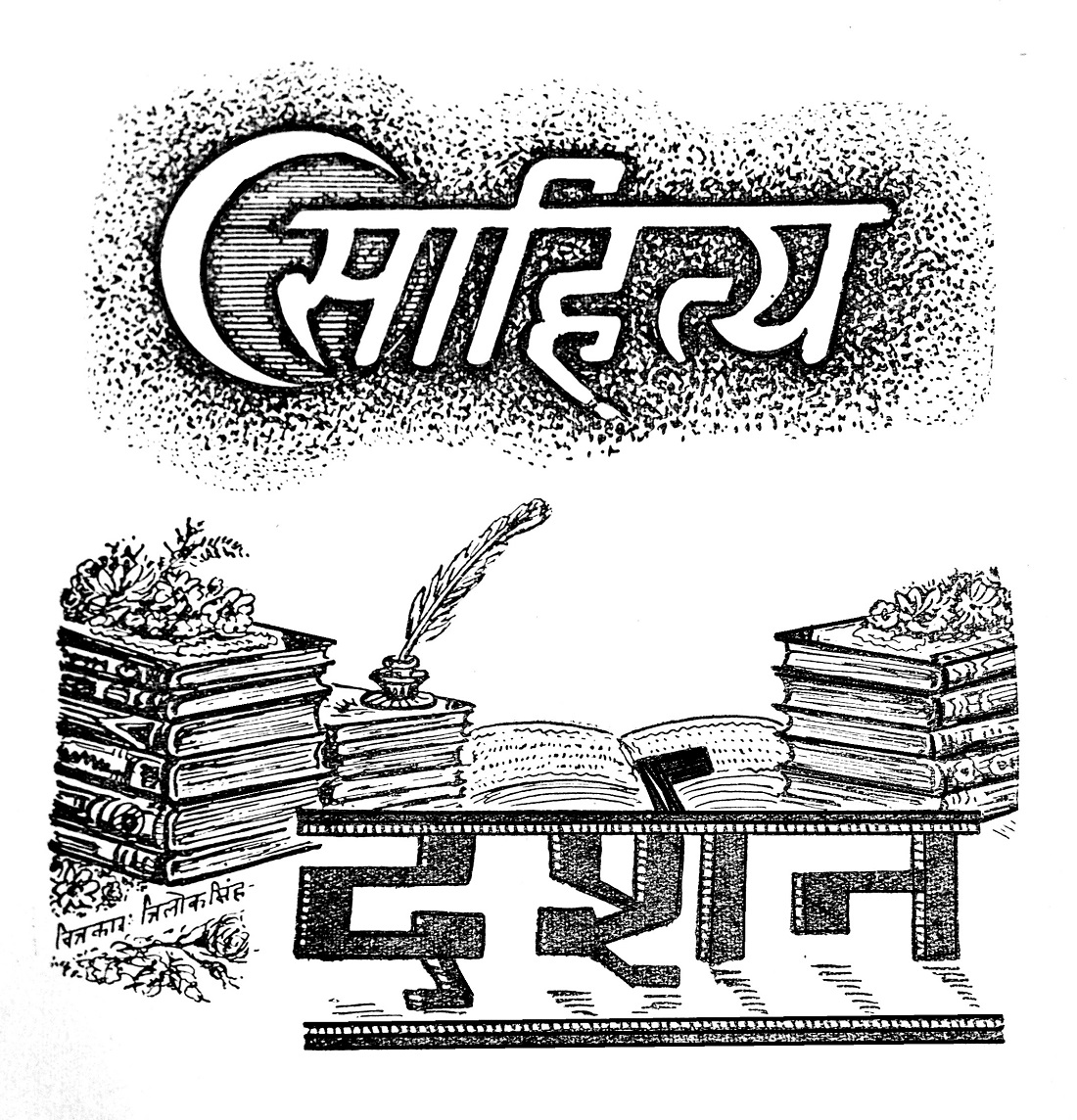
1955- Hindi works

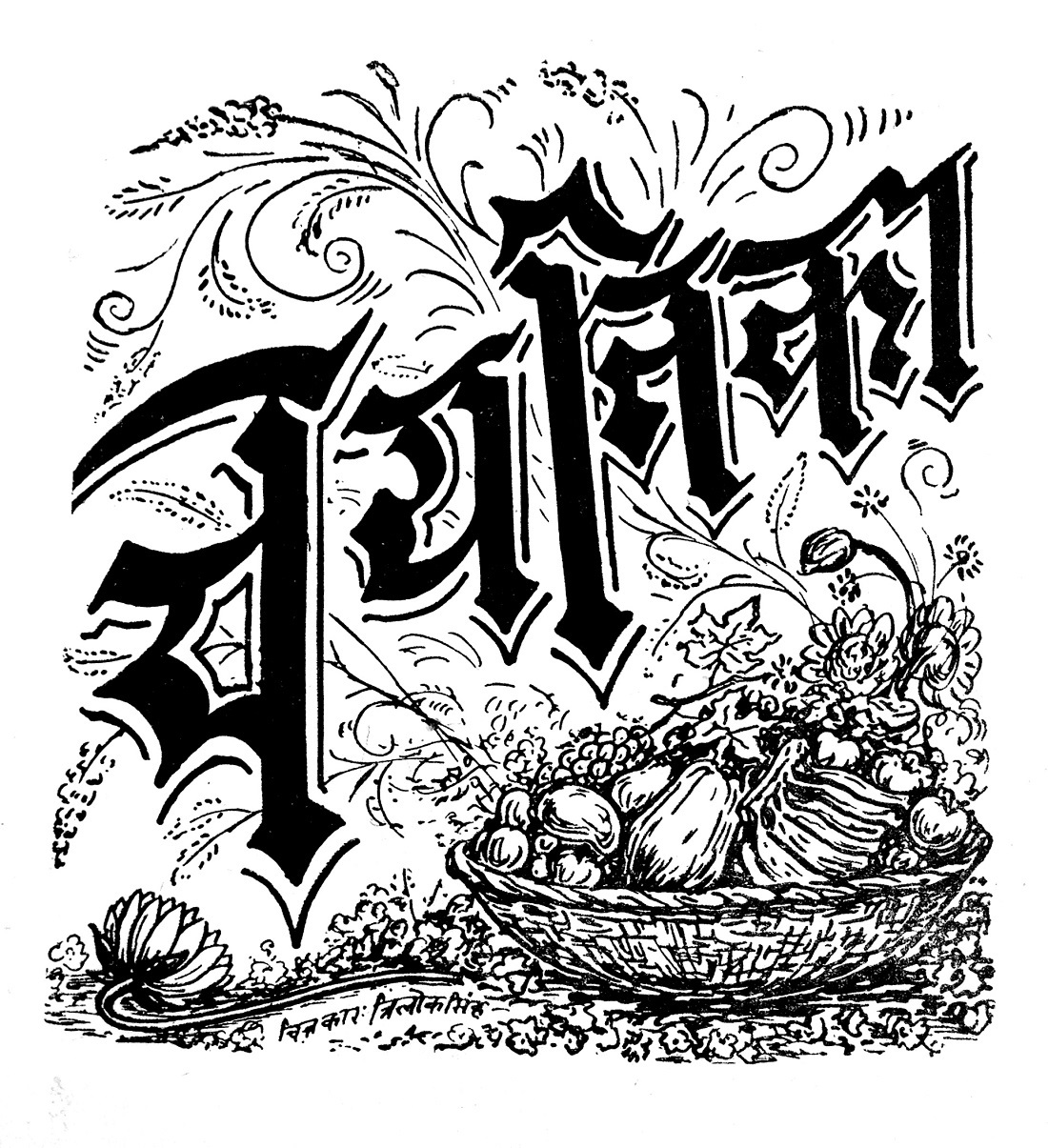
1955 - Hindi works

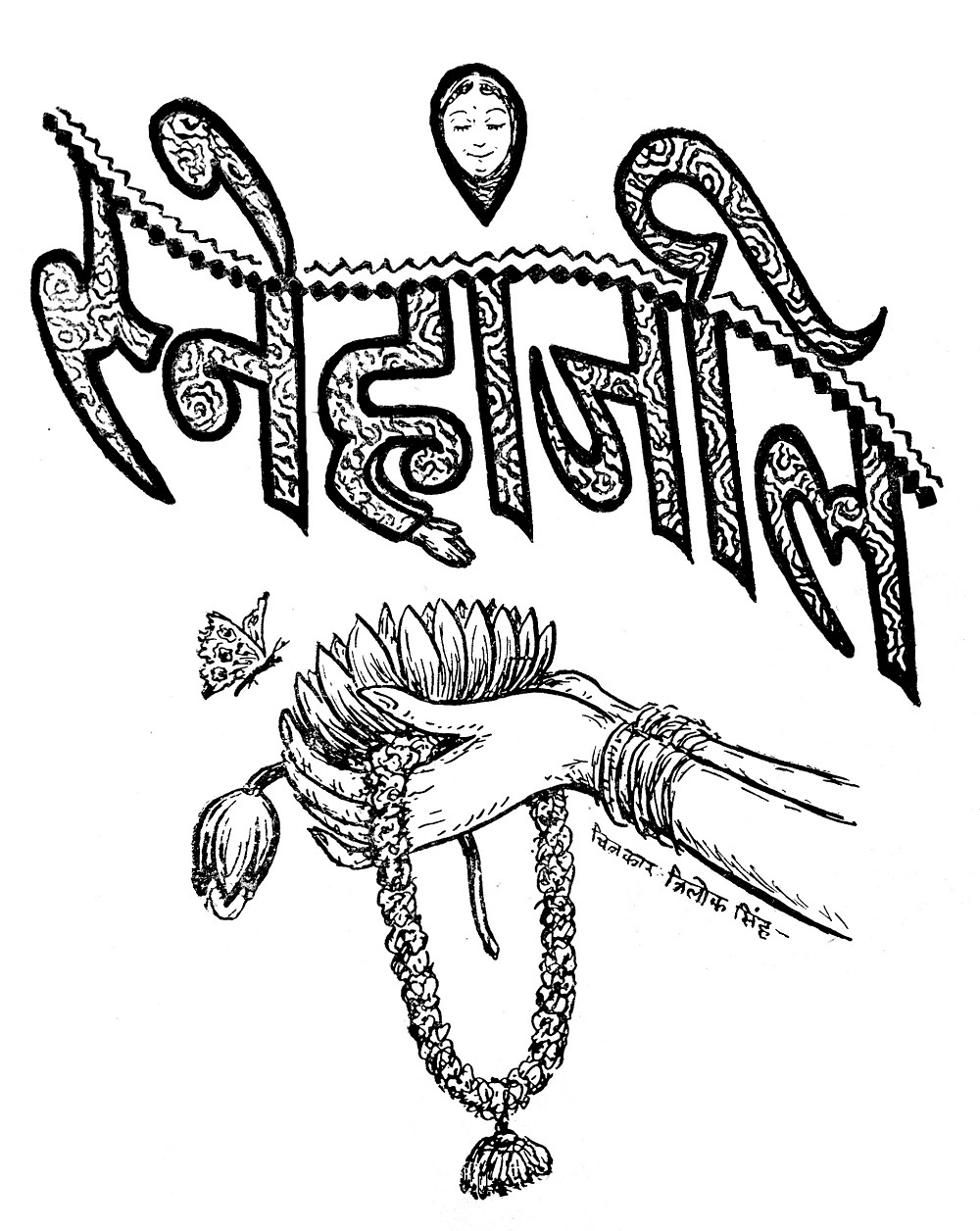
1955 - Hindi works

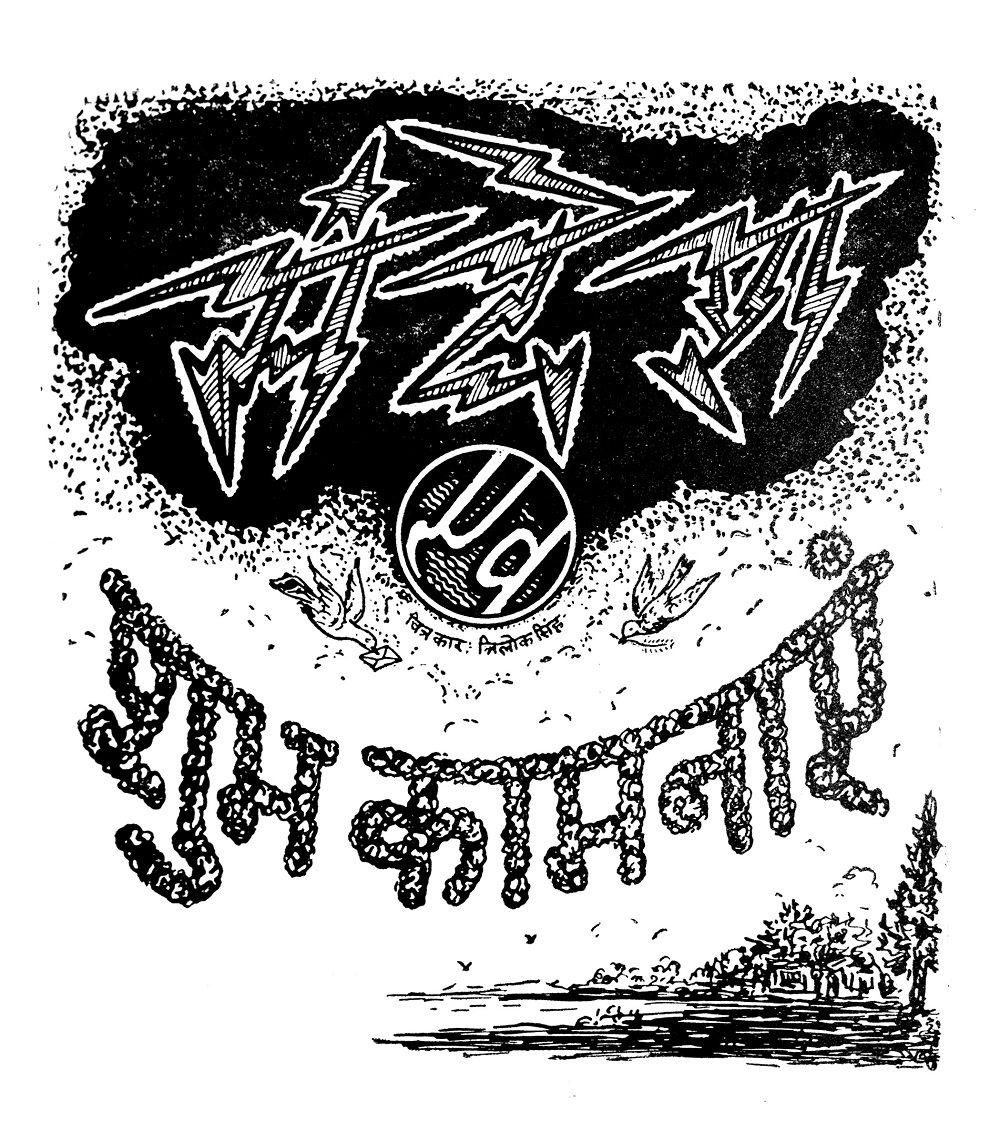
1955 - Hindi works

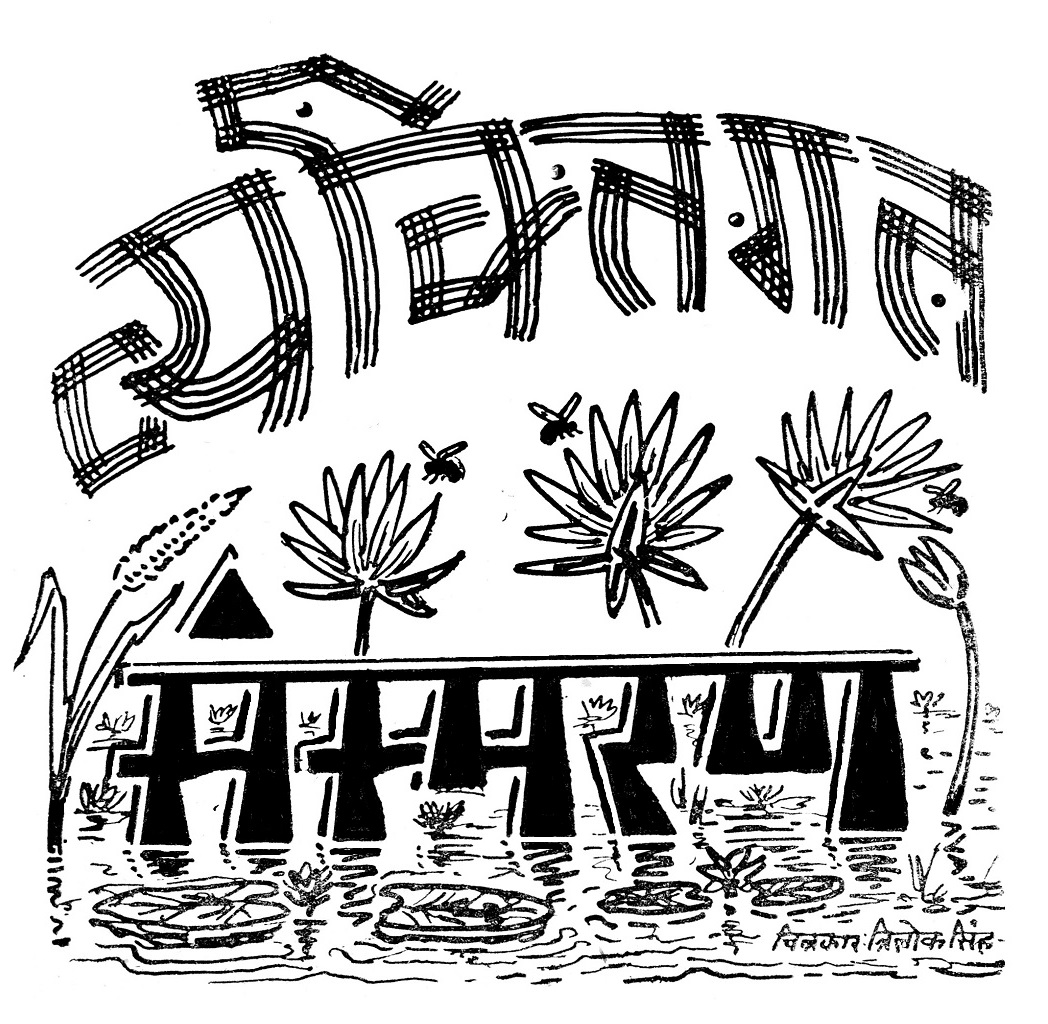
1955 - Hindi works

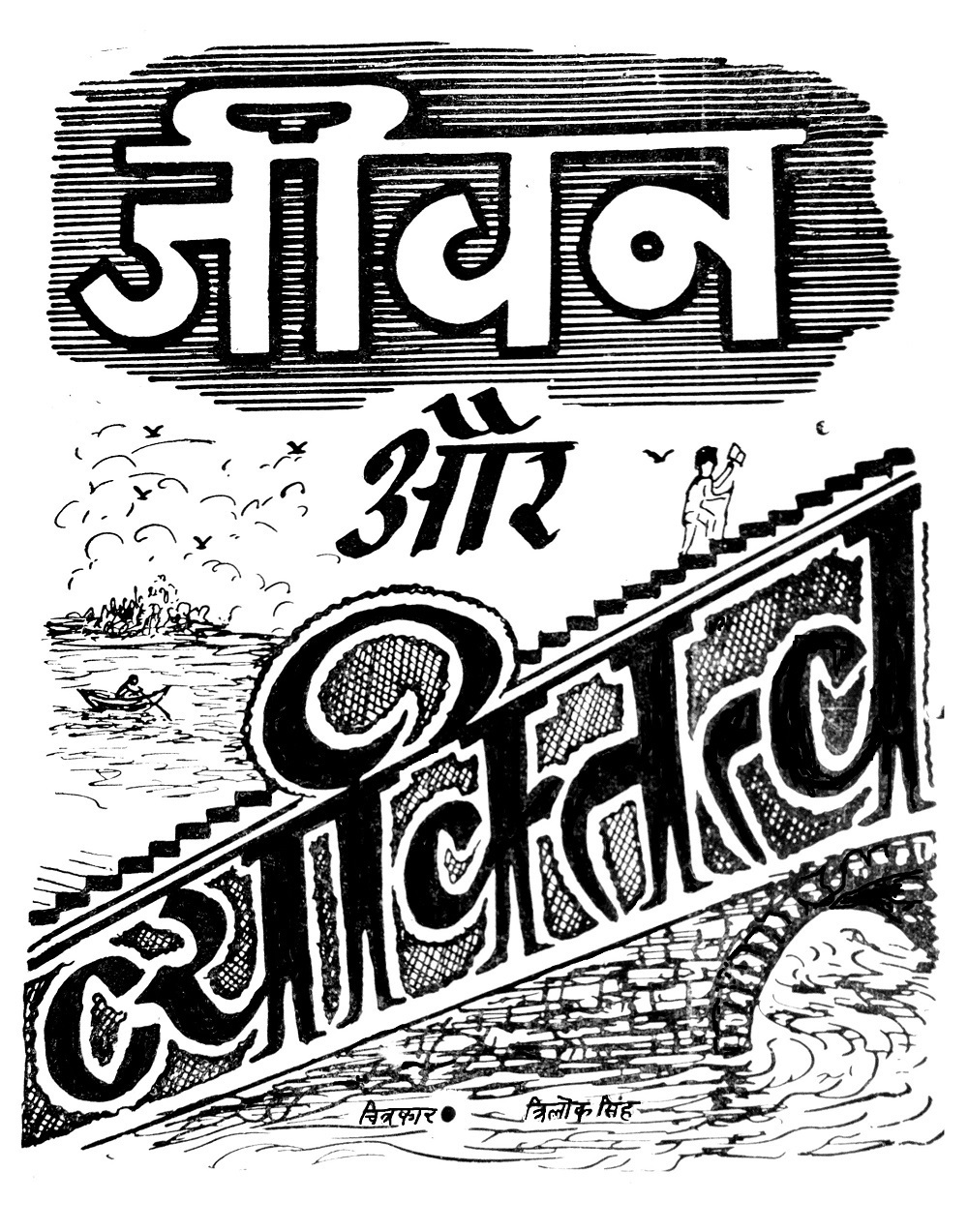
1955 - Hindi works
