= Gurbakshish Singh =

Indian politician

Member of Legislative Assembly of Patiala & East Punjab States Union
- In office 1954–1957

Member of the Punjab Legislative Assembly
- In office 1962–1965
- Preceded by: Kartar Singh
- Succeeded by: S.Singh

Personal details
- Born: 1 January 1911 Karmgarh, Barnala, Punjab, British India
- Died: 1983 (aged 72)
- Party: Indian National Congress
- Education: Aitchison College
- Occupation: Politician, feudal lord

Gurbakshish Singh (1911-1983) was an Indian politician. He was Member of the Legislative Assembly (MLA) who represented the Barnala Constituency, in Punjab.

== Early life and family background ==
Singh was born in 1911 to the royal family of Karamgarh (now Barnala District) and was a wealthy landlord of the erstwhile Patiala State, he was titled as the Rais of Karamgarh. According to the revenue records and census reports of year 1901 the area of nizamat of Karamgarh was 1834 sq miles which included 4 towns and 665 villages with a population of 500,635 people.

He was an active sportsman and a part of the elite cricket team of Chiefs College, Lahore (Aitchison College), played tennis, horse riding and shooting. The village of Karamgarh is named after Karam Singh who succeeded the throne of Maharaja of Patiala in 1813 and ruled until his death in 1845. Later on Mahendra Singh of Patiala, his younger son Raja Sahib Sir Ranbir Singh KCSI born 1873 was married to the daughter of Sardar Lahna singh of Karamgarh in 1889, he was made a KCSI in January 1903; he was granted the title of Raja in 1915.

His father Rais Gurbaksh Singh of Karamgarh was an Honorary Magistrate and exercised civil and criminal powers in the nizamat of Karamgarh. Gurbaksh Singh was married into the old family of the Wazir’s of the princely state of Nabha. His brother in law, General Shivdev Singh, was a wealthy landlord and the Prime Minister of the Nabha State. Gurbaksh Singh had 3 sisters who were married into the Royal families of Patiala State, Nabha State and Raja of Malaudh.

He became actively associated with the Congress Party while attending Aitchison College in Lahore, Pakistan. He was related to Yadavindra Singh who was Maharaja of Patiala and Raja Bhalindra Singh, had close proximity with Mohammad Reza Pahlavi who was the Shah of Iran, took the title of Shahanshah ("King of Kings") in 1967 and ruled from 1941-1979 as the last Shah of Iran.

Gurbakshish Singh’s nephews, Amarinder Singh, is currently serving as the 15th Chief Minister of Punjab in India and Raja Randhir Singh is a sports administrator and an ex-Olympian shooter.

== Education ==
Educated at Chief’s college, later known as Aitchison College, Lahore. A diploma holder alongside Iftikhar Ali Khan Pataudi who was Nawab of Pataudi and his younger brother Sher Ali Khan Pataudi who later served in the Pakistan Army, Amin ud-din Ahmad Khan who was the last Nawab of princely state of Loharu, ruling from 1926 to 1947, Nawab Malik Amir Mohammad Khan who was a prominent feudal lord, politician and the chief of his tribal estate Kalabagh in North Western Punjab, Pakistan who later served as the Governor of West Pakistan and Yadavindra Singh, Maharaja of Patiala. He returned to Patiala after completing his education.

== Politics and social work ==
He became an influential figure in agricultural development and the spread of education in India. He was an active member of the Indian National Congress and of the AD state party and he was a key figure in the Punjabi Suba movement agitation for the creation of “Punjabi Suba” which led to the creation of present day Punjab and Haryana in 1966.

Singh was twice an MLA including his first term from Sherpur in 1954 in the Patiala & East Punjab States Union from Indian National Congress and then won the elections from Barnala in 1962 when he defeated Sampuran Singh Dhaula a close aide of the then Chief minister of Punjab Partap Singh Kairon.Singh served as an advisor to Shiromani Akali Dal in 1960’s for a short tenure before quitting politics. He also served as the President of Khalsa college, Patiala unanimous for more than 20 years.

Singh was involved in national reconstruction work and the development of services for the Dalit caste and the downtrodden. He helped organize relief during the 1955 floods and donated 22,000 Bighas of cultivable land to his tenants.
