= Patiala State =

Indian royal state that existed from 1763 to 1947

Coordinates: 31°07′N 77°38′E

- 1762–1948
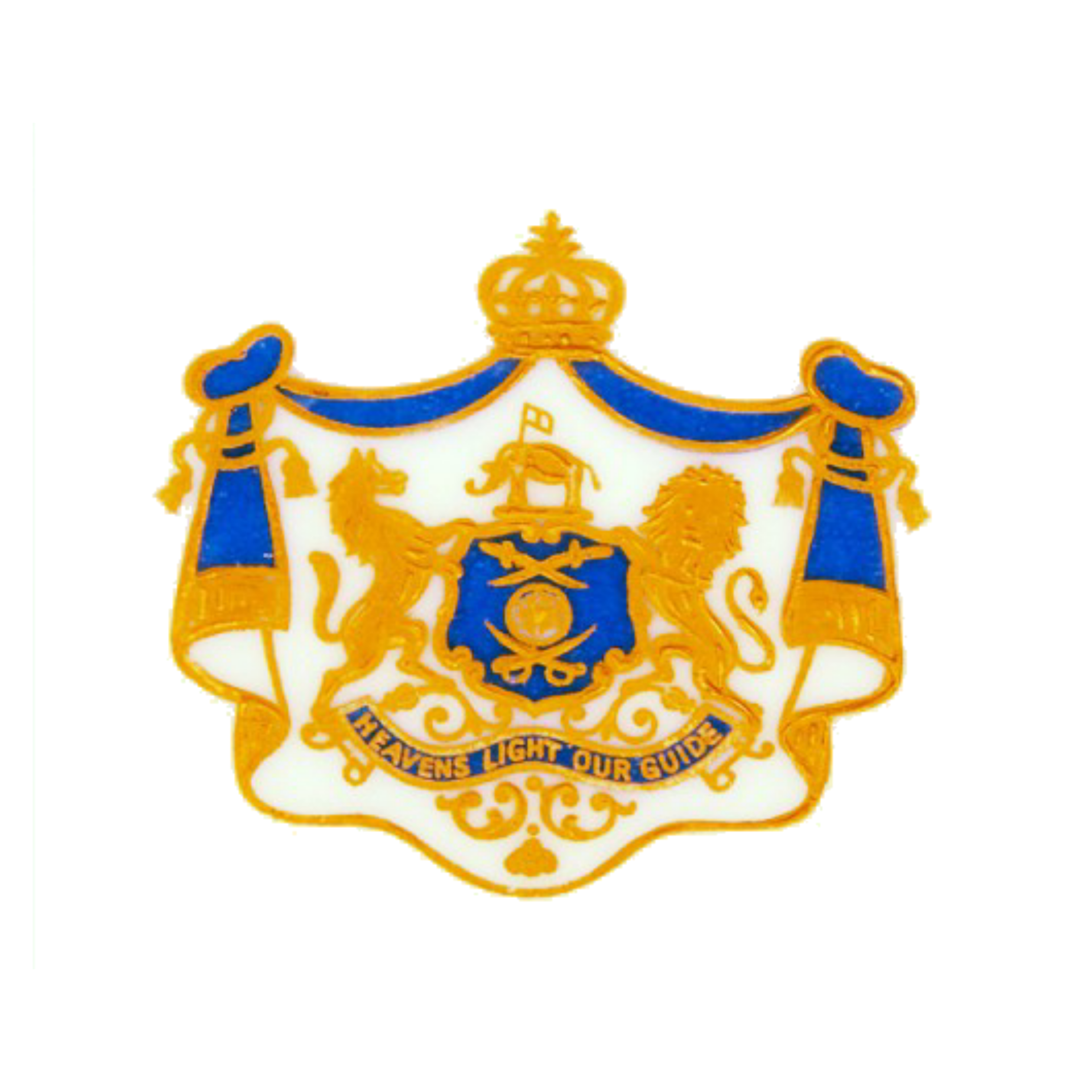
- Flag Coat of arms

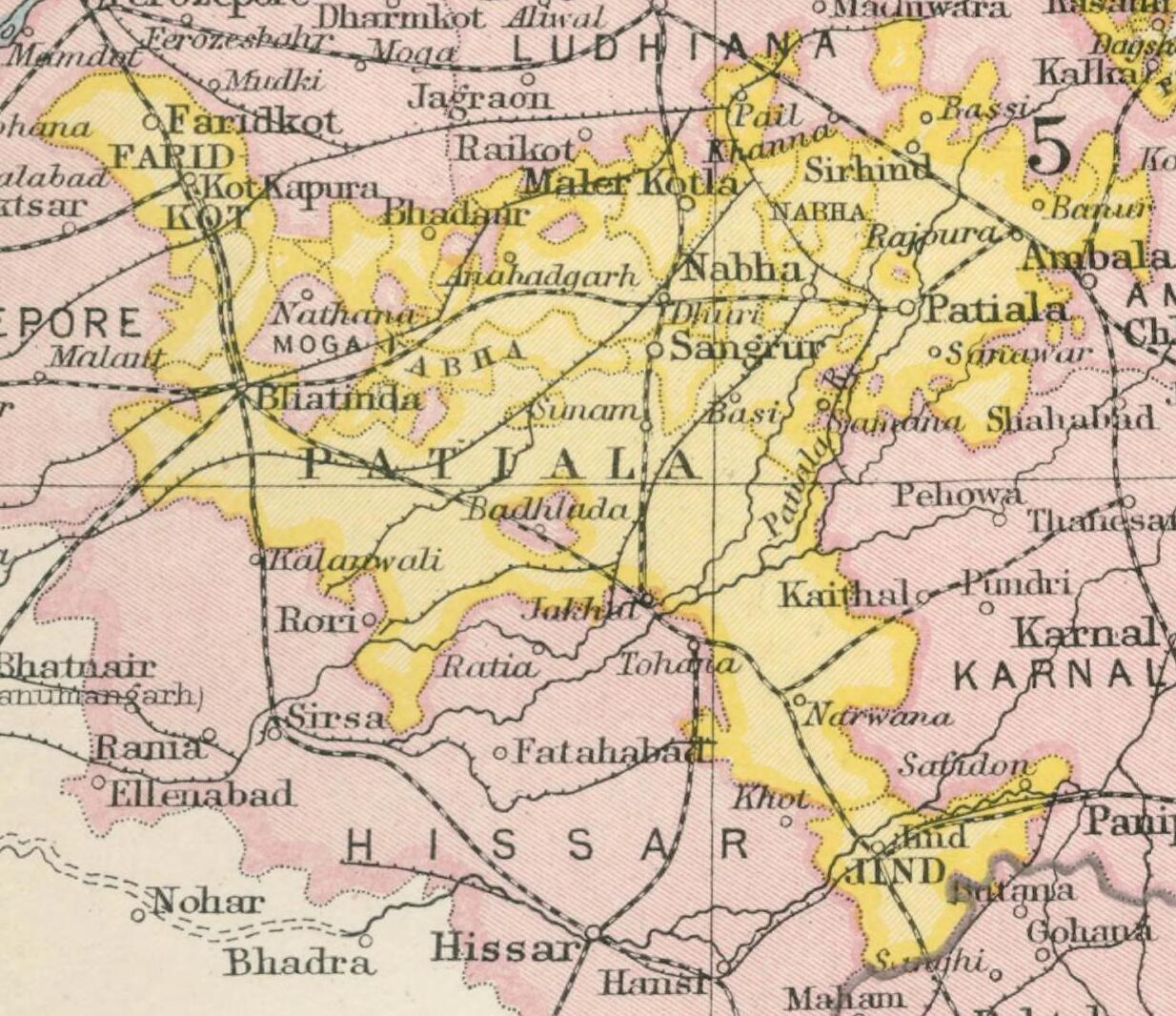
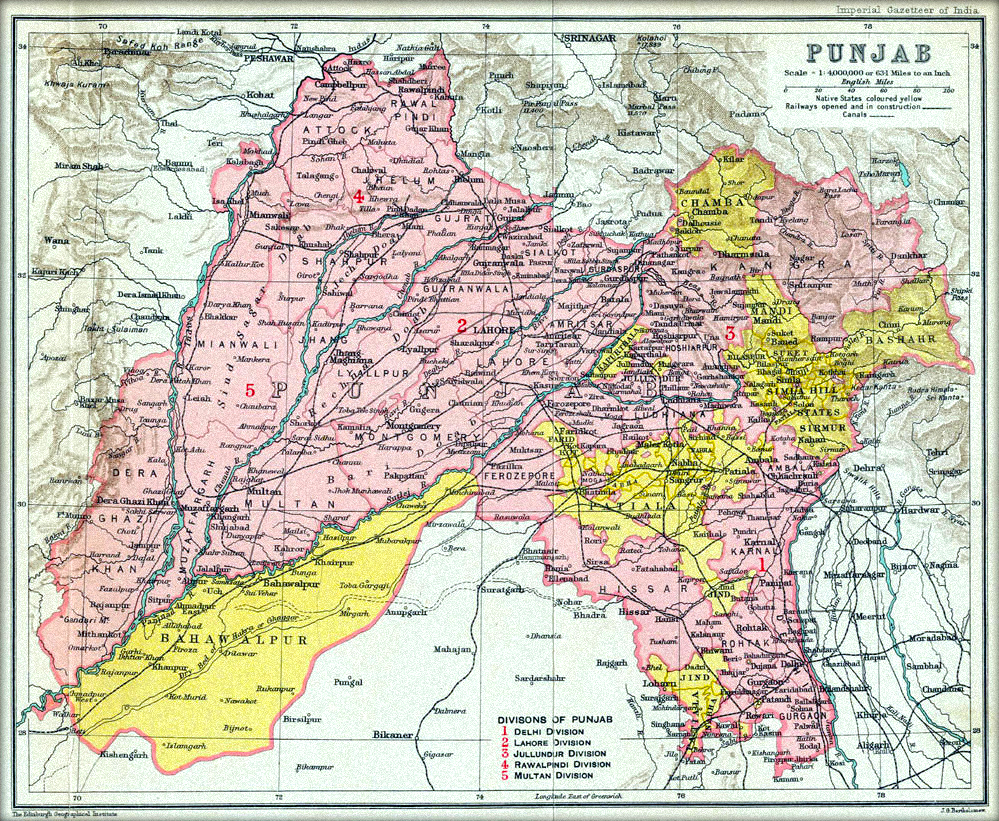
- Capital: Patiala
- Religion (1941): 46.28% Sikhism; 30.86% Hinduism; 22.55% Islam; 0.16% Jainism; 0.08% Christianity; 0.08% others
- Maharaja
  - 1763–1765: Ala Singh (first)
  - 1938–1948: Yadavindra Singh (last)
- History
  - Founded: 1762
  - Treaty of Amritsar: 25 April 1809
  - Accession to the Union of India: August 1947
  - Dissolved: 15 July 1948

Area
- Total: 15,389 km^{2} (5,942 sq mi)

Population
  - 1941: 1,936,259
  - 1931: 1,625,520
  - 1921: 1,499,739
  - 1911: 1,407,659
Preceded by	Succeeded by
Mughal Empire; Durrani Empire	Patiala and East Punjab States Union
- Today part of: India

Patiala was a kingdom and later a princely state of India. It was one of the Phulkian States that acceded to the Union of India upon Indian independence and partition in 1947. It was founded as a kingdom by Ala Singh in 1762. During the reign of Maharaja Karam Singh from 1813 to 1845, Patiala was the second-largest Sikh state in Punjab. After the collapse of the Sikh Empire, Patiala emerged in the mid-19th century as a powerful state, leading to greater revenue and territory, with the patronage of the arts. The state's ruler, the Maharaja of Patiala, was entitled to a 17-gun salute and held precedence over all other princes in Punjab during the British Raj. The state was ruled by Jat Sikhs of the Sidhu clan.

The kingdom's imperial troops also fought in World War I and World War II on behalf of the British Indian Empire.

== Etymology ==
The state took its name from its principal city and capital, Patiala, from Punjabi patti ("strip of land") and ala (referring to Ala Singh), together meaning a strip of land belonging to Ala Singh, founder of the city and state.

== History ==
=== Family background ===
The ruling family traced their origin to Krishna, via Yadu. The Patiala ruling family remotely claimed origins from Bhati Rajputs of Jaisalmer in the 12th century, specifically the Jadon Bhati chief Jaisal who was the founder and first ruler of Jaisalmer. Based on this, the Phulkian rulers claimed Rajput status up-to the 20th century. At some point, their ancestors moved from Jaisalmer in Rajasthan to Phul in Punjab. The ruling house claims descent from Rao Hem Hel of Jaisalmer, the third son of Jaisal, who settled in 1185 at Bhatinda. (Note: Rao Hem Hel's name is alternatively spelt as 'Hemhel', he is alternatively known as Han Raj or Bhim Mal (as per Giani Gian Singh).) Other sources describe Hem Hel as being the grandson of Jaisal. Hem Hel would expand to Hisar, where he was pushed back to Bhatinda by Prithviraj Chauhaun. Hem Hel managed to take control of territory located south of Muktsar and expelled the previous Punwar rulers from the tract. Hem Hel died in 1214 and was succeeded by his son Jaidrath (Jundar).

Between 1526 and 1560, the ancestral family of the later Patiala rulers was headed by chaudhary Bariam, a Phulkian Jat. Bariam was awarded with a chaudhriyat grant by the Mughal emperor Babur in 1526 due to his actions in supporting the Mughal invader at the First Battle of Panipat. This grant allowed Bariam to collect revenue from the badlands located to the southwest of Delhi.

In 1560, custodianship over the family was then led by Mehraj, who was followed by Pukko. Pukko was followed by Mohan, who led the family until 1618. Mohan and his son Rup Chand were killed in circa 1618 during a skirmish with Bhattis.

From 1618 onwards, the family was led by Kala, who was the second-son of Mohan. Kala was succeeded by Phul, a son of Rup Chand. (Note: Phul was one of the two sons of Rup Chand, with the other son being Sandali.) According to lore, Phul met with Guru Hargobind, with the guru prophesying that Phul's descendants would spread-out and be successful. This was through the Sikh guru making a pun on Phul name, which means "flower", and that Phul's descendants would "bear many blossoms" and "satisfy the hunger of many". Phul had seven sons and two wives, with two prominent sons being Rama and Tiloka, with both being born to the same mother. The progeny of Tiloka would form the houses of Nabha and Jind whilst Rama's descendants became the Patiala ruling-house. Phul headed the family until 1652, being succeeded by Rama Chand. Rama's son was Ala Singh. According to Kavita Singh, the family converted to Sikhism in the generation before Ala Singh.

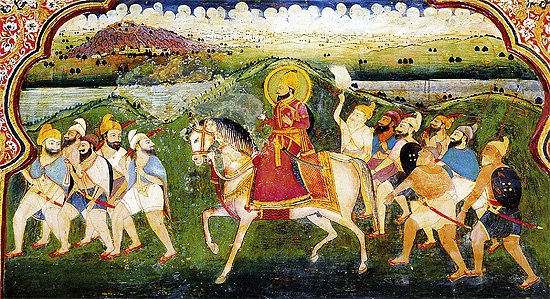
Guru Gobind Singh, damaged fresco from Qila Mubarak, Patiala, circa 19th century

In 1696, Guru Gobind Singh is believed to have blessed the family, having issued a hukamnama edict on 2 August 1696 (2 Bhadon 1753 Bk.) addressed to Rama Chand and Tiloka Chand of the family urging them to visit the guru's court and bring with them men and horses. The Sikh guru also gifted Rama and Tiloka a battle-standard and eleven weapons, which is seen as bestowing a special accord onto the family. In 1702, Rama and Tiloka underwent the pahul ceremony at Damdama Sahib, with their Khalsa baptism being conducted by Guru Gobind Singh himself. Thus-after, the family started appending the Singh title to their name. However, according to Barbara Ramusack, Ala Singh was the first member to adopt the Singh title. Out of the six sons of Rama, two of them also appended their name with Singh (with one of these two being Ala Singh). Rama Chand was succeeded as head of the family by Ala Singh in 1714. Whilst Rama's descendants formed the ruling house of Patiala State, the descendants of Tiloka formed the ruling house of Nabha and Jind states.

Ala Singh, the founder of Patiala State, was a descendant of the Sidhu clan of Jats. He was born into the Phulkian dynasty, a confederacy established by Chaudhary Phul Sidhu-Brar. Ala was the third-son of his father Rama. Ala Singh's leadership and military prowess enabled him to establish Patiala as a significant princely state in the Punjab region.

=== Founding and territorial evolution ===
The state originated as one of the many chiefdoms the Sikhs had established in the former Mughal province of Delhi after the collapse of Mughal and Afghan authority in the region. According to Giani Gian Singh's Twarikh Guru Khalsa, Ala Singh was bestowed the title of raja by emperor Muhammad Shah of the Mughal Empire in 1725 C.E. (1781 Bk.) at the Delhi Durbar to recognize Ala Singh's efforts toward fighting insurgents. Ala Singh was awarded the title by Wasiyar Khan of Sirhind. Afterwards, Ala Singh would expand and consolidate his power. Ala Singh, establisher of Patiala, had been conquering territory since around 1730.

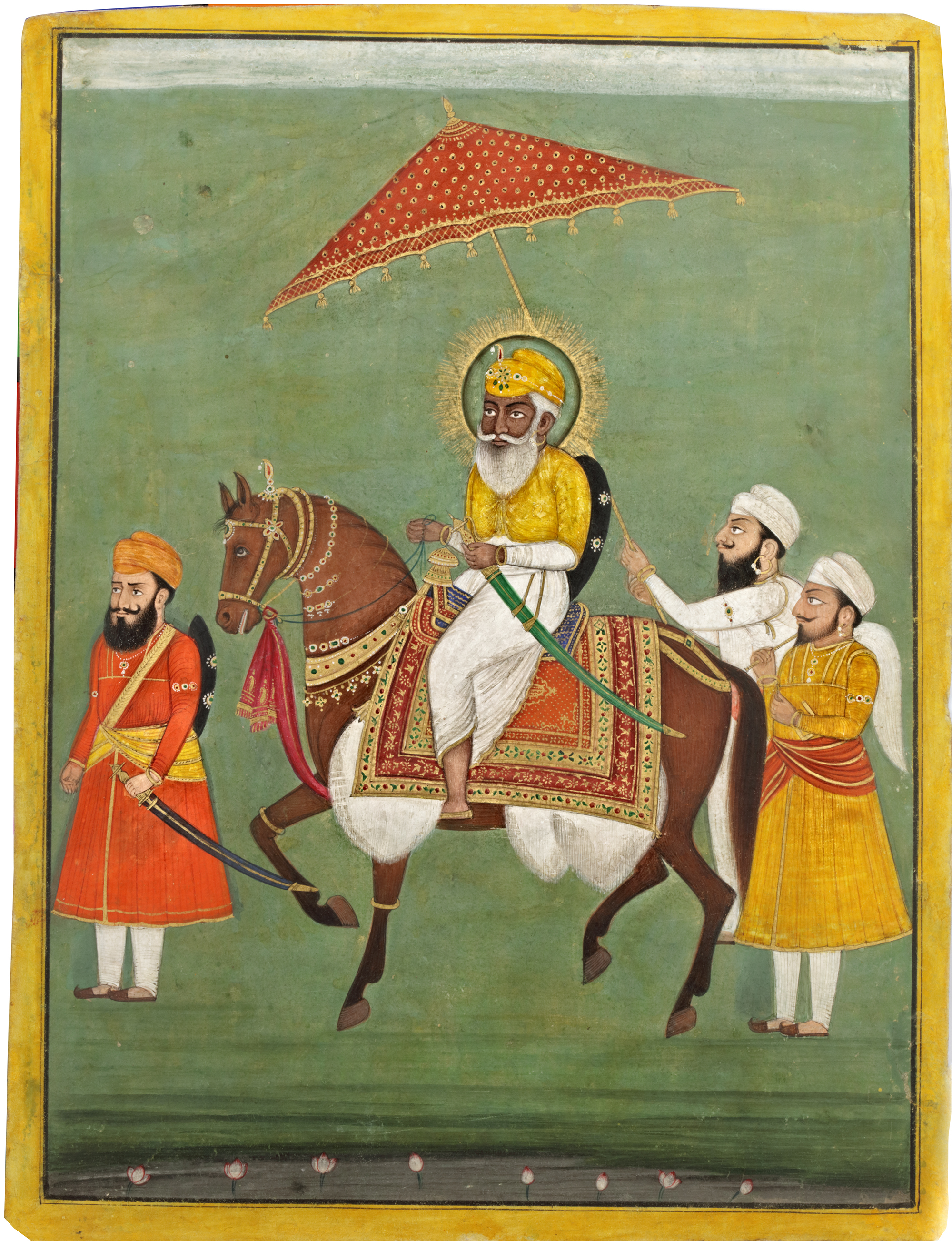
Equestrian painting of Maharaja Ala Singh of Patiala, gouache heightened with gold on paper

The locality of Patiala was founded by sardar Ala Singh in 1752. Ala Singh's rule is characterized by careful statecraft that allowed him to build his revenue and political status through careful geopolitical navigation, balancing both allegiance and independence vis-a-vis the Mughals and Durranis, much to the dismay of the Dal Khalsa. In 1761, the Afghans defeated the forces of Ala Singh at Barnala. Ahmad Shah Abdali had targeted Barnala locality of the Patiala chief due to Ala Singh assisting the Marathas by providing them supplies. Mai Fatto, Ala Singh's wife, responded diplomatically to the situation and managed to arrange a meeting between Ala Singh and Ahmad Shah Abdali through negotiations with Shah Wali Khan, the wazir of Abdali. Ala Singh was captured by the Afghans and taken to Ahmad Shah Abdali. This was the first meeting between Abdali and Ala Singh. The Afghans demanded a four lakh rupee ransom to secure Ala Singh's release. Abdali wanted to win-over Ala Singh to his cause and Ala Singh became a vassal of the Afghans. In a firman issued by Ahmad Shah Abdali to Zain Khan Sirhindi on 29 March 1761, it is noted that Ala Singh possessed 726 villages, particularly in the parganas of Sunam (224), Samana (266), Sirhind (52), Sanaur (89), Chhat (8), Masigan (17), Kohram (6), Banur (37), and Mansurpur (23), and there were four villages in other locations. Aside from the confirmation of the villages in his possession, Ala Singh also received a robe-of-honour from Abdali. The firman commanded Zain Khan to recognize Ala Singh as an independent chief and an ally of the Afghans. Mir Taqi was appointed to obtain tribute from Ala Singh. Thus, Ala Singh in 1761 was bestowed with a sanad giving him chaudhari rights and the raja title from the Durranis.

Patiala State was founded by Ala Singh as a chiefship slightly later in March 1762 after Ahmad Shah Abdali bestowed Ala Singh with the raja title, gifting him with a robe-of-honour, nagadas (war drums), the right to coin money, and an embrace. Yet Ala Singh was expected to bestow an annual tribute on the Afghan ruler. Ramusack dates this bestowal several years later in 1765. In 1763, after the Battle of Sirhind, the Sikh Confederation partitioned the Sirhind area and gave the territory to Ala Singh. The areas in Sirhind, along with Ala Singh's other conquered territories, formed the initial territories of the Patiala state. Also in 1763, Ala Singh constructed a mud-fortress (kachigarhi) around a mound, known as the Qila Mubarak (meaning "blessed fort"), which may have been established to ward off Afghan invasions. Human settlements and bazaars would form around this fort, leading to the formation of Patiala as a population centre. Ala Singh established the rules for the right of succession based on primogeniture. Indu Banga describes Ala Singh as being politically expedient in his external relations, where local Sikh leaders benefited from a complex series of relations in a region where various parties were vying for dominance. Ala Singh relied more on negotiation rather than aggression to expand his territory. However, his diplomatic approach toward the Mughals and Afghans differed from that of the Sikh Misls in the Majha region, which brought him into conflict with the Majha Sikhs, who were more militaristic toward their perceived enemies.

After Ala Singh reconciled with the Afghan ruler, becoming his vassal and receiving a robe-of-honour, he was criticized by his fellow Sikh chiefs of the Dal Khalsa as a traitor. Ala Singh defended himself by stating that he only had two options, fight Abdali and lose, meaning a loss of Sikh control over the cis-Sutlej region, or become his vassal and preserve Sikh power in the area. Jassa Singh Ahluwalia helped Ala Singh make his case to the rest of the Sikh leaders, and the other Sikh chiefs accepted Ala Singh once again. After Abdali's departure, the cis-Sutlej region was embroiled in-conflict again, with the Sikhs launching raids and extracting tribute from the Sirhind region and its governor, Zain Khan Sirhindi, being unable to get the situation under control. The diwan of Zain Khan, named Lakshami Narain, was attacked by Sikhs while en-route during revenue-collection, who stole the funds. Aside from Sirhind, the situation in Lahore province was also dire for the Afghans, as the governor Khwaja Obed was killed by the Sikhs under Charat Singh. Thus, Abdali decided to act and punish the Sikhs for their antics, which would lead up into a mass-killing known as the Vadda Ghalughara, in-which around 12,000–15,000 Sikh men were slaughtered by the Afghan forces.

According to many, Ala Singh failed to assist his religious kin during the massacre. He stayed neutral during the events and did not initiate hostilities against the Durranis. However, this neutrality would not save Ala Singh as Abdali, whom had been told that Ala Singh was a "secret ally of the Majhi Sikhs" by Zain Khan and Bikhan Khan, would later burn down Barnala and advanced upon Bhawanigarh, where Ala Singh was holed up. Ala Singh sought out the help of Najib-ud-Daula and was forced to pay a humiliating fee of "five lakhs of rupees as tribute and a hundred and twenty-five thousand rupees more for permission to appear before him with his long hair intact" to placate Abdali. After this, Ala Singh was detained for a short-while but was released on the promise that his polity would pay an annual tribute to the Durranis.

Kirpal Singh argues that Ala Singh did assist his co-religionists during the massacre. He states that the vakil of Ala Singh, named Sekhu Singh Hambalka, was with the surrounded Sikhs during the massacre at Kup. He claims that Sekhu Singh and Sangu Singh were ordered to lead the Sikh women and children to Barnala and Thikriwala for safety, which were within Ala Singh's territory. This is evidenced in the Khazana-i-Amara, which states that a report of 200,000 fleeing Sikhs sought safety in Sirhind and near the territory of "Ala Singh Jat" was made when Abdali reached Lahore. By the time Abdali reached Barnala, Ala Singh had already managed to escape. This damaged Ala Singh's relations with Abadali, whom was already being told negativities about Ala Singh by the diwan Lakhshami Narain. Thus, Ala Singh was arrested and nearly had his hair cut-off but managed to pay a fee instead. When Abdali demanded that Ala Singh's hair be cut, Ala Singh responded that he was prepared to die rather than sacrifice his hair. Ala Singh offered to pay one lakh rupees instead, with Abdali accepting a payment of 125,000 rupees. After the massacre, Ala Singh joined a coalition of Sikh forces to punish Zain Khan, to prove he was still with the Dal Khalsa. This led to the Battle of Sirhind on 13 January 1764, in-which the Sikh forces defeated the forces of Zain Khan, paving the way for Sikh domination of this tract of land for the foreseeable future.

Patiala State continued to expand during the rule of Ala Singh's successor, Raja-Rajgan Amar Singh. He was the first ruler to receive the Raja-e-Rajgan title.

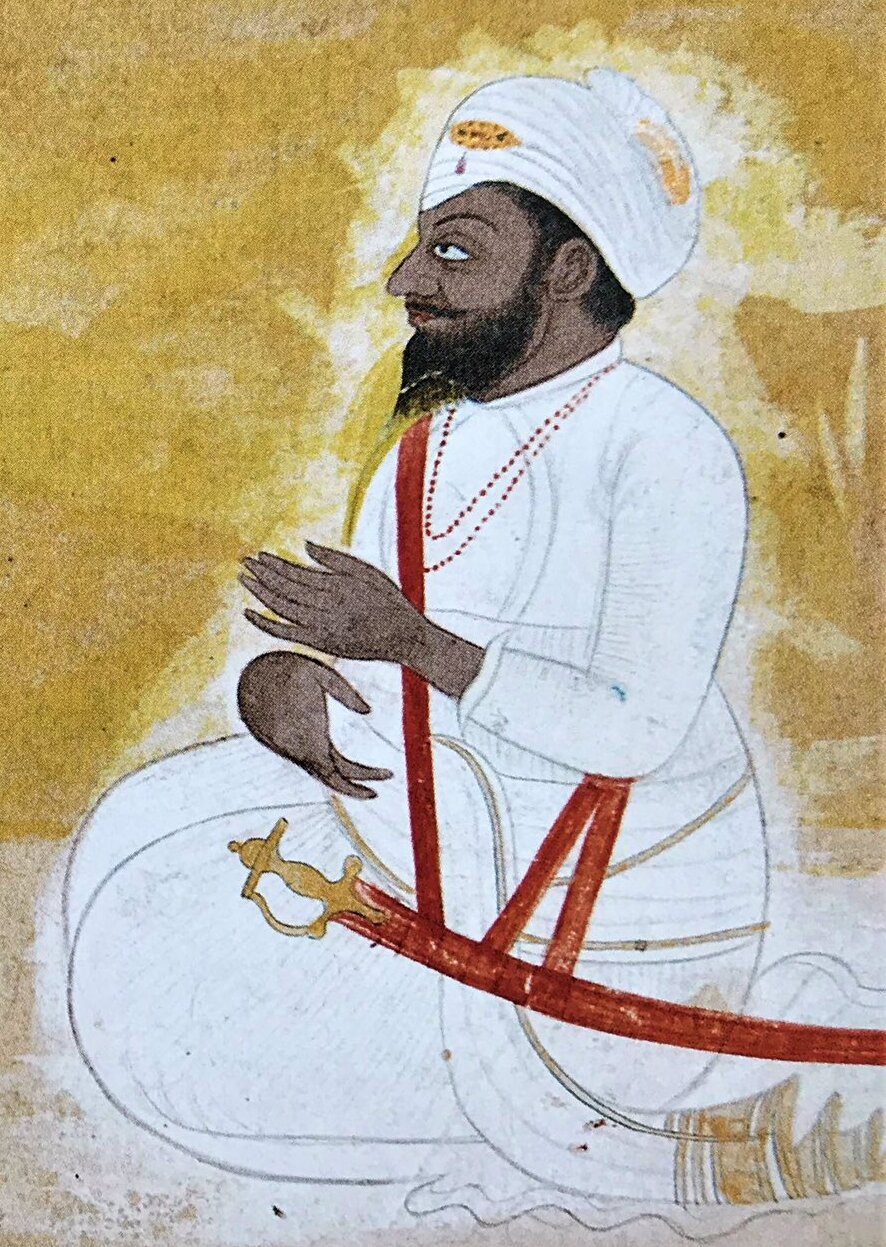
Amar Singh of Patiala

Ala Singh's successor, Amar Singh (b. 1748, r. 1765–1782), took-on the Raja-i-Rajagan Bahadur title in 1767. Amar Singh became a baptized Sikh and expanded the polity through crafty alliances and strategic conquests, expanding at the expense of the Mughals and other Sikh states. After Amar Singh's death, there were a series of succession dispute in Patiala, with the north-ward expanding Marathas and other regional, rival Sikh chiefs taking advantage of it to advance their own interests in the region. However, during the 1790s, women of the Patiala ruling-house, notably Rani Rajinder Kaur (d. 1791, cousin of Amar Singh) and Rani Sahib Kaur (d. 1799, sister of Sahib Singh) defended the political entity from the Marathas through their leadership. In 1783, the state's territory reached the outskirts of Delhi but receded afterwards back to the Punjab due to the Chalisa famine.

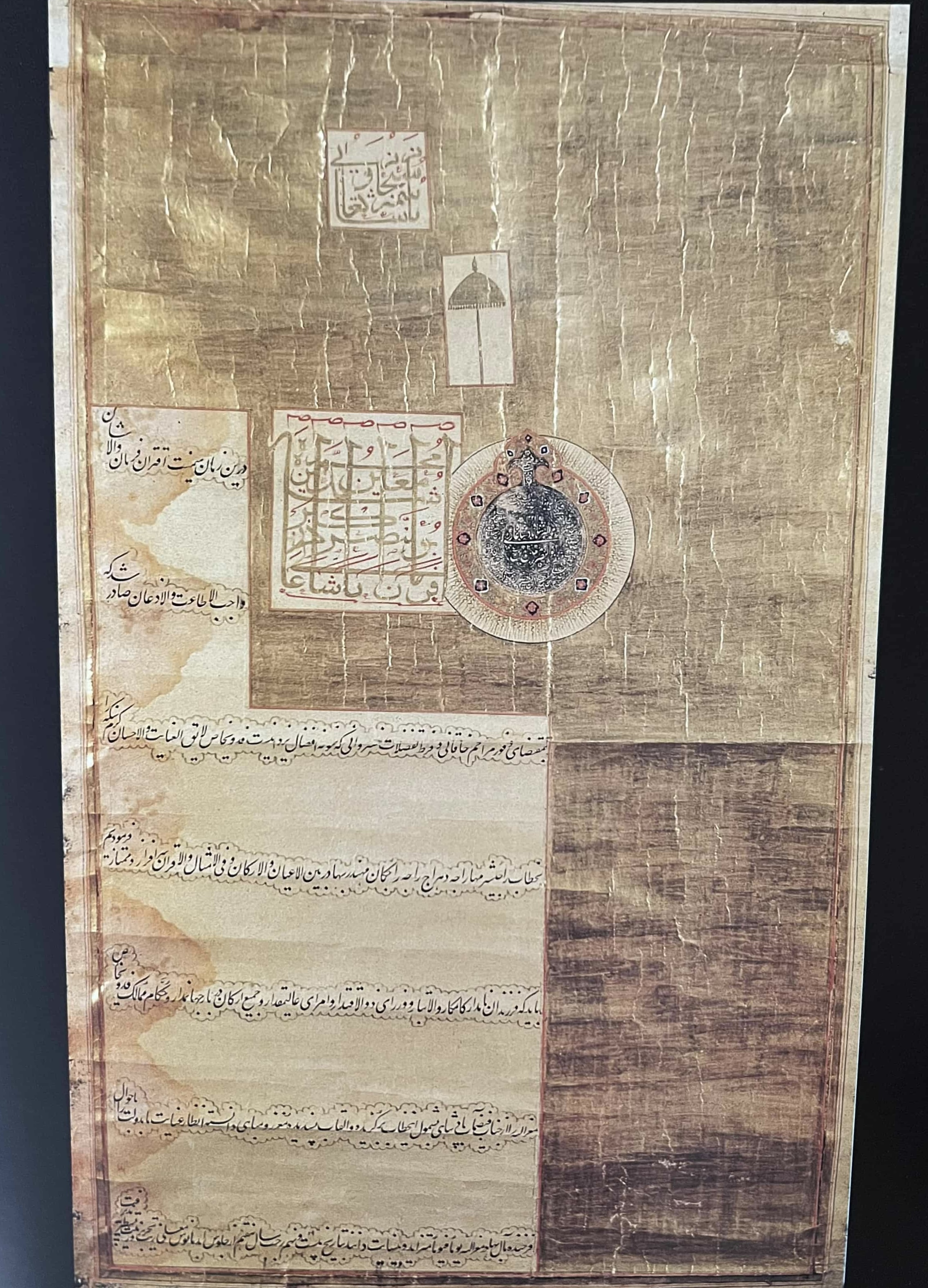
Farman issued by the Mughal emperor Akbar II to the ruler of Patiala, ca.1806–07

Maharaja Sahib Singh (the first ruler to hold the title of Maharaja), expanded the kingdom further, but he was also aware of the expanding Sikh Empire of Lahore. Therefore, he became an ally of the British East India Company. Patiala State, which initially had recognized the suzerainty of the Sikh Empire to its north, became a British protectorate in 1809 via treaty in-order to protect itself from annexation by Ranjit Singh, with the Sikh Empire and East India Company signing the 1809 Treaty of Amritsar. Seventy other principalities signed treaties with the British around this time after Patiala. The treaty effectively made Patiala and the cis-Sutlej region a buffer area between the Sikh Empire and the East India Company. Despite signing a treaty with the British, the Patiala rulers maintained internal autonomy.

Map created by the British East India Company of the Malwa region of Punjab showing the various polities, borders, and settlements of the area, ca.1829–1835. The state of Patiala dwarfed other cis-Sutlej states in-size.

The next major expansion of Patiala State's territory occurred during and after 1814, under Karam Singh, the first Patiala ruler to be crowned under British suzerainty. For Karam Singh's support during the Anglo-Nepalese War, which took place between 1814 and 1816, the British Empire awarded him territory in the hill states, extending Patiala State's territory to areas in what is now Himachal Pradesh, including Shimla and Chail. Under Karam Singh, a number of reforms were introduced, such as ending petty disputes with other chiefs, increasing centralization such as via land revenue policy, and improving the power and independence of the treasury by reducing the influence of moneylenders. Another reform was that after 1829, the Diwans of Patiala began recording state revenue records in Persian rather than Landa script, as had been the case. Furthermore, there was a patronage of the arts under Karam Singh. After the First Anglo-Sikh war, which took place between 1845 and 1846, the state expanded again when, in return for its support during the war, the British Empire confiscated land from Nabha State and rewarded it to Patiala State.

After 1857 and during the rule of Narinder Singh, Patiala State's territory was expanded for the final time. Narinder Singh's services and the support to the British Empire resulted in Patiala State gaining sovereign rights in the Narunal division of Jhajjar, in modern Haryana, and he purchased the taluka of Khamanu. Narinder Singh was also granted administrative jurisdiction over Bhadaur and the annual revenue from the area.

=== British suzerainty ===
In 1809, Patiala State entered into an alliance with the British Empire, whereby the state was given internal autonomy with certain restrictions, and the rulers of Patiala state recognised the British Empire as their suzerains. The death of Maharaja Karam Singh is mysterious, with there existing different theories. According to one claim suggested by The Illustrated London News (April 1846 issue), Karam Singh was executed by the British via hanging for supporting the Sikh Empire during the First Anglo-Sikh War in 1845–46. Another theory is that he was poisoned by his durbaris (courtiers) for refusing to support the Sikh Empire during the war. A third belief is that he died from illness. His successor, Narinder Singh, deepened ties with the British and provided them assistance, such as during the 1857 rebellion, with Patiala being recognized as a 17-gun salute state. At the Ambala Darbar held in Ambala between 18 and 20 January 1860, a decision to exempt Patiala, Nabha, and Jind states from the doctrine-of-lapse. During the British Raj, the rulers of Patiala State were entitled to a 17-gun salute and held precedence over every other princely state in the Punjab Province. In 1891, Dewan Gurmukh Singh, Finance Minister of Patiala State, authored the Guru Nanak Parkash, covering the Patiala ruling dynasty, a manual of princely conduct, and also a commentary on Sikh scripture.

Maharaja Bhupinder Singh developed an elaborate, courtly culture and was involved with the Chamber of Princes, patronized sports, and was involved in international matters.

=== Independence and abolition ===
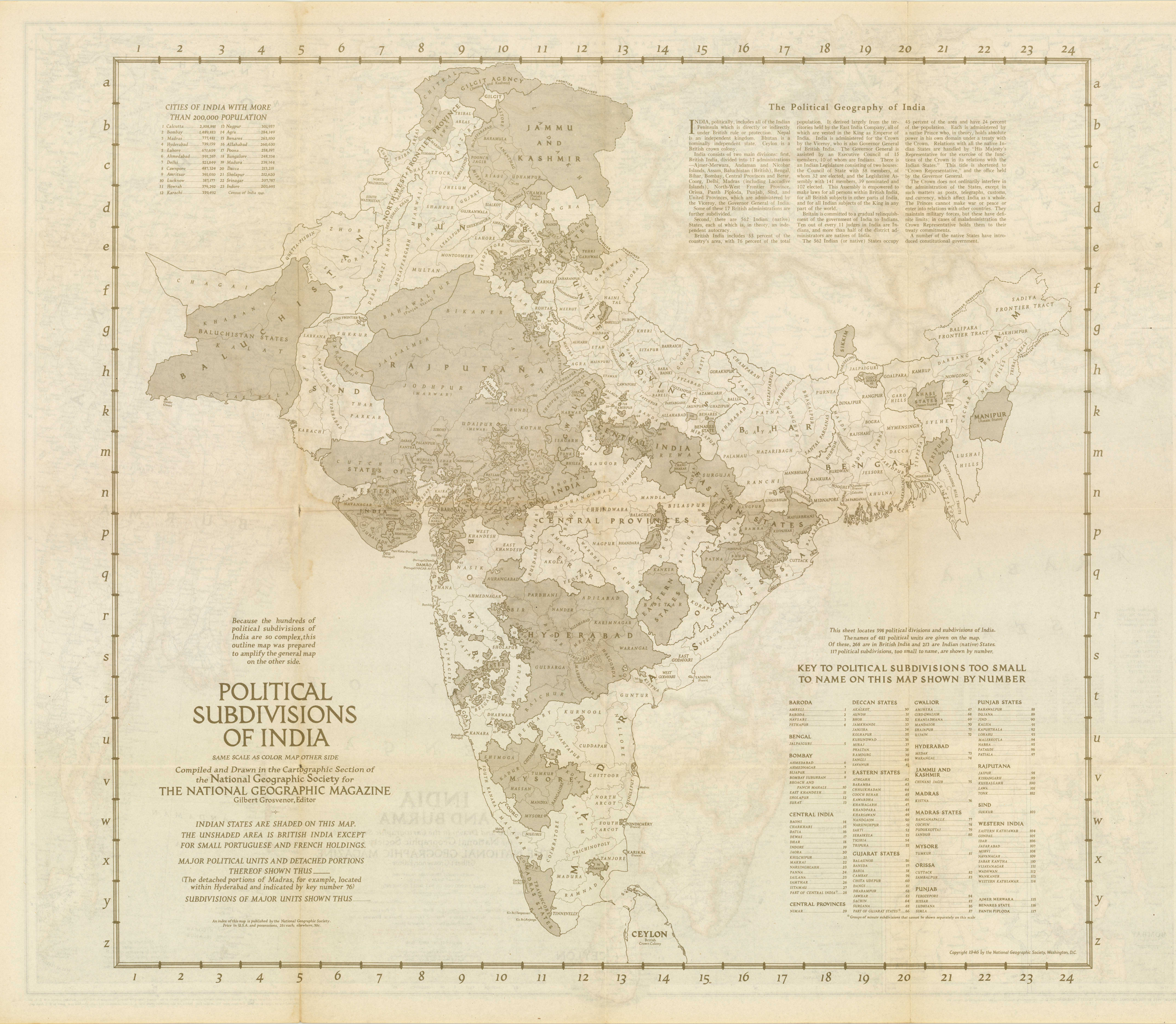
1946 map of India showing the various states; Patiala is found in the middle of eastern Punjab

In 1947, Yadavindra Singh, the last Maharaja of Patiala, agreed to the accession of Patiala State into the independent Dominion of India. Patiala became the capital of the Patiala and East Punjab States Union (PEPSU). PEPSU was merged into the State of Punjab in 1956. Members and descendants of the Patiala royal family maintained their princely titles until they were abolished in India in 1971 through the 26th Amendment to the Constitution of India. Patiala State's historical territory is in the Indian states of Punjab, Haryana and Himachal Pradesh. The current Patiala heirs reside in New Moti Bagh Palace.

== Role of women in Patiala State ==
Many women played prominent roles in Patiala State throughout its history. Lepel Griffin remarked that the Phulkian chiefs (including Patiala) excluded women from positions of power due to "... suspicion that they [women] were able to use it far more wisely than themselves [men]". Political intrigues by energetic queens led to the removal of power and royal succession with British approval of Patiala monarchs in 1837 and 1858.

According to Syad Muhammad Latif: "For many years Patiala was under the influence of women of courage, wisdom and activity, such as Rani Hukman, Rani Khem Kaur, Bibi Pardhan Kaur, the grand aunt of Maharaja Sahib Singh and Rani Rajender Kaur of Phagwara."

Some notable women of Patiala State are as follows:

- Mai Fatto
- Bibi Pardhan Kaur
- Bibi Rajindar Kaur
- Bibi Sahib Kaur

The first ruler, Ala Singh, only had one wife as maintaining a zenana was rendered difficult in the politically and militarily uncertain situation of 18th century Punjab. However, his successors would have multiple wives. The women of the state became housed and enclosed in a zenana located in the Qila Androon section of the Qila Mubarak in the second quarter of the 19th century.

== Rulers and titles ==
=== Raja ===
- 29 March 1762 – 22 August 1765: Ala Singh (b. 1691 – d. 1765)
- 22 August 1765 – 1767: Amar Singh (b. 1748 – d. 1781)

=== Raja-e-Rajgan ===
- 1767 – 5 February 1781: Amar Singh (s.a.)
  - 1771 – 1774: Himmat Singh (Pretender; died 1774)
- February 1781 – 1813: Sahib Singh (b. 1774 – d. 1813)
  - 1781 – 1790: Dewan Nandu Mal (Regent)

=== Maharaja ===
- 26 March 1813 – 23 December 1845: Karam Singh (b. 1797 – d. 1845)
  - 26 March 1813 – 1823: Maharani Aus Kaur (f) – Regent (b. 1772 – d. af.1823)
- 23 Dec 1845 – 13 November 1862: Narinder Singh (b. 1823 – d. 1862) (from 25 June 1861 Sir Narendra Singh)
- 13 November 1862 – 14 April 1876: Mahendra Singh (b. 1852 – d. 1876) (from 28 May 1870 Sir Mahendra Singh)
  - 13 Nov 1862 – 26 February 1870: Jagdish Singh (Regent, chairman of regency council)
- 14 Apr 1876 – 9 November 1900: Rajinder Singh (b. 1872 – d. 1900) (from 21 May 1898 Sir Rajendra Singh)
  - 14 April 1876 – October 1890: Sir Deva Singh (Regent) (b. 1834 – d. 1890) (chairman of regency council)
- 9 November 1900 – 23 March 1938: Bhupinder Singh (b. 1891 – d. 1938) (from 12 December 1911 Sir Bhupindra Singh)
  - 9 November 1900 – 3 November 1910: Sardar Gurmukh Singh – (Regent, chairman of regency council)
- 23 Mar 1938 – 15 August 1947: Yadavindra Singh (b. 1913 – d. 1974) (from 1 January 1942 Sir Yadavindra Singh)

== Administration ==
Khalifa Sayyad Mohammad Hassan served as the Prime Minister of Patiala during the reigns of Karam Singh, Narinder Singh, and Mohinder Singh. During the mid-nineteenth century, Mir Imdad Ali served as a senior state officer (*Diwan*) of Patiala State under Maharaja Narinder Singh (1845 – 1862) and Maharaja Mahendra Singh (1862 – 1876). He was the son of Mir Zulfikar Ali, who had entered Patiala service under Maharaja Sahib Singh, and the father of Mir Tafazzal Hussain Chief Justice of Patiala, after whom the locality Tafazalpura was later named. As a Kingdom and later a Princely State, Patiala was one the few polities in the Indian subcontinent to have a fully established currency mint that had the capacity to regularly produce gold mohurs and the mohurs were approved by suzerain powers.

=== Administrative divisions ===
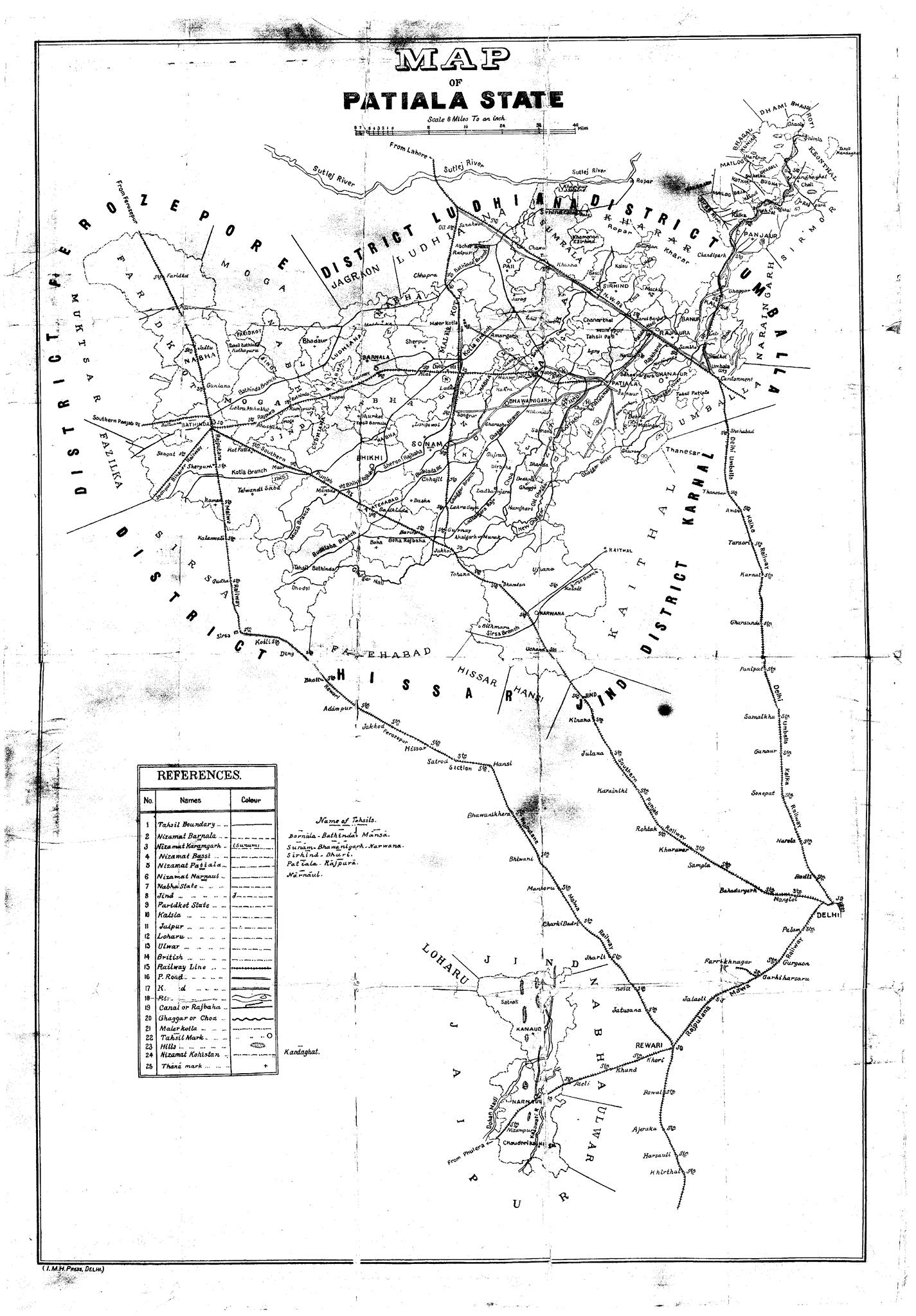
Map of Patiala State, including its internal administrative divisions (nizamats and tehsils) 1941

Patiala State was divided into various districts (Nizamat) and sub-districts (Tehsil).

Administrative Divisions of Patiala State (1941)
District	Tehsil	Police Stations
Patiala	Rajpura	Rajpura, Lalru, Banur
Patiala	Patiala	Kotwali & Sadar Patiala, Ghanaur, Behru
Bassi	Dhuri	Sherpur, Dhuri, Payal
Bassi	Sirhind	Bassi, Sirhind, Mulepur
Karamgarh	Narwana	Narwana
Karamgarh	Sunam	Sunam, Munak
Karamgarh	Bhawanigarh	Bhawanigarh, Dirba, Samana
Anahadgarh	Bhatinda	Bhatinda, Raman
Anahadgarh	Barnala	Barnala, Bhadaur
Anahadgarh	Mansa	Mansa, Bhikhi, Sardulgarh, Boha
Kohistan	Kandaghat	Kandaghat, Dharampur, Pinjore
Mahendargarh	Narnaul	Satnali, Mahendragarh, Narnaul, Nangal Chowdhry
Today, the entire Mahendragarh district is part of Haryana. Most of Narwana tehsil also lies within Haryana, while the majority of the former Kohistan district is now divided between Himachal Pradesh (Kandaghat part) and Haryana (Pinjore part). The remaining districts are now part of Punjab.

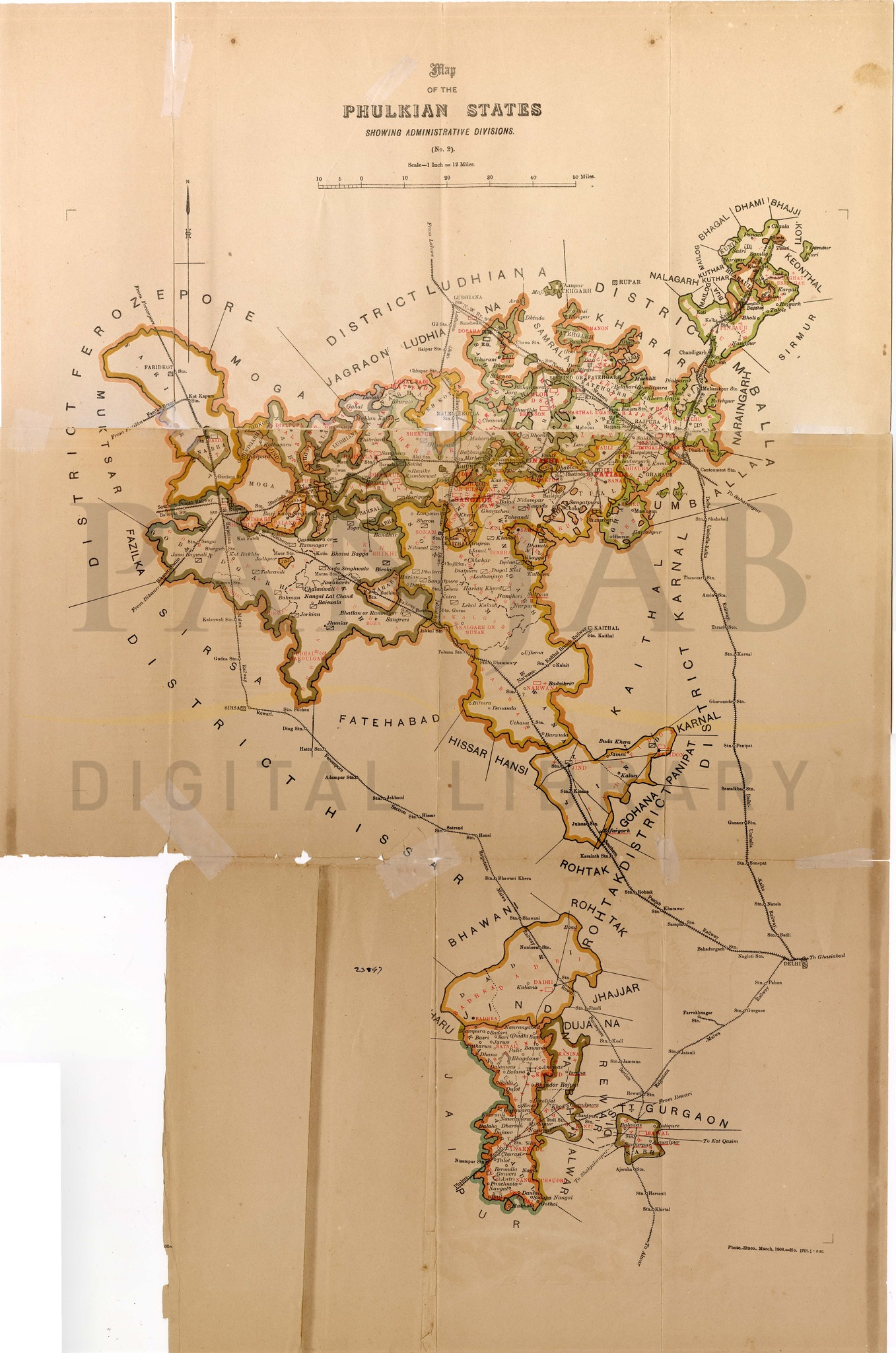
Map of the Phulkian & Neighbouring States showing administrative divisions and railway lines from Lahore to Delhi, c. 1909. Source: Wikimedia Commons

Administrative Divisions of Patiala State (1904)
District (Nizāmat)	Tahsil	Remarks
Karmgarh, also called Bhawānigarh, at which place its head-quarters are.	Patiāla	also called Chaurāsi, in Pawādh.
Karmgarh, also called Bhawānigarh, at which place its head-quarters are.	Bhawānigarh	or ‘’’Dhodhān’’’, Pawādh and partly in the Jangal.
Karmgarh, also called Bhawānigarh, at which place its head-quarters are.	Sunām	mostly in the Jangal.
Karmgarh, also called Bhawānigarh, at which place its head-quarters are.	Narwāna	comprising the Bāngar.
Amargarh, also called Bāssī, at which place its head-quarters are.	Fatehgarh	or ‘’’Sirhind’’’, in the Pawādh.
Amargarh, also called Bāssī, at which place its head-quarters are.	Amargarh	also known as ‘’’Dhūrī’’’, where the present tahsīl headquarters are, in the Jangal.
Amargarh, also called Bāssī, at which place its head-quarters are.	Sāhibgarh	or ‘’’Payal’’’, where the head-quarters are, mainly in the Jangal and partly in the Pawādh.
Anāhadgarh, also called Barnāla, at which place its head-quarters are.	Anāhadgarh	in the Jangal.
Anāhadgarh, also called Barnāla, at which place its head-quarters are.	Govindgarh	or ‘’’Bhatinda’’’, in the Jangal.
Anāhadgarh, also called Barnāla, at which place its head-quarters are.	Bhīkhi	in the Jangal.
Pinjaur	Rājpura	in the Pawādh.
Pinjaur	Banūr	in the Pawādh.
Pinjaur	Ghanaur	in the Pawādh.
Pinjaur	Pinjaur	in the Himālayān area.
Mohindargarh, popularly called the Nārnaul nizāmat.	Mohindargarh	also called Kānaud, from the name of the old fort and town at which its head-quarters are.
Mohindargarh, popularly called the Nārnaul nizāmat.	Nārnaul	also called Kānaud, from the name of the old fort and town at which its head-quarters are.

== Demographics ==
1941 Census of Patiala State (Religion-wise Distribution)
District & Tehsil	Hindu		Sikh		Islam		Christian		Jain		Parsi	Jews	Budh	Others		Total
District & Tehsil	Pop.	%	Pop.	%	Pop.	%	Pop.	%	P.	%	P.	P.	P.	Pop.	%	Pop
PATIALA	82,639	27.77%	108,937	36.61%	104,929	35.27%	603	0.20%	256	0.09%	8	7	3	158	0.05%	297,540
Patiala	52,802	28.81%	62,469	34.08%	67,384	36.76%	329	0.18%	146	0.08%	8	7	3	158	0.09%	183,306
Rajpura	29,837	26.12%	46,468	40.68%	37,545	32.87%	274	0.24%	110	0.10%	0	0	0	0	0.00%	114,234
BASSI	52,747	13.75%	218,960	57.07%	111,026	28.94%	549	0.14%	24	0.01%	1	0	0	368	0.10%	383,675
Sirhind	26,149	16.12%	73,258	45.16%	62,174	38.33%	375	0.23%	0	0.00%	1	0	0	255	0.16%	162,212
Dhuri	26,598	12.01%	145,702	65.79%	48,852	22.06%	174	0.08%	24	0.01%	1	0	0	113	0.05%	221,463
KARAMGARTH	167,790	36.67%	194,457	42.50%	93,210	20.37%	63	0.01%	2,079	0.45%	0	0	0	0	0.00%	457,599
BhawaniGarh	24,413	16.48%	77,250	52.15%	46,420	31.34%	1	0.00%	48	0.03%	0	0	0	0	0.00%	148,131
Narwana	112,025	71.67%	24,009	15.36%	18,643	11.93%	0	0.00%	1,629	1.04%	0	0	0	0	0.00%	156,306
Sunam	31,352	20.47%	93,198	60.85%	28,147	18.38%	63	0.04%	402	0.26%	0	0	0	0	0.00%	153,162
ANAHADGARTH	68,290	12.57%	371,165	68.33%	102,051	18.79%	325	0.06%	575	0.11%	0	5	0	792	0.15%	543,203
Barnala	17,460	14.33%	79,372	65.14%	24,710	20.28%	116	0.10%	126	0.10%	0	0	0	55	0.05%	121,839
Mansa	22,600	12.04%	136,454	72.69%	28,647	15.26%	10	0.01%	0	0.00%	0	0	0	0	0.00%	187,711
Bhatinda	28,230	12.08%	155,339	66.48%	48,694	20.84%	199	0.09%	449	0.19%	0	5	0	737	0.32%	233,653
KOHISTAN	53,797	88.58%	2,296	3.78%	4,579	7.54%	49	0.08%	3	0.00%	12	0	0	12	0.02%	60,736
Kandaghat	53,797	88.58%	2,296	3.78%	4,579	7.54%	49	0.08%	3	0.00%	12	0	0	12	0.02%	60,736
MAHENDRAGARTH	172,225	89.00%	206	0.11%	20,744	10.72%	3	0.00%	164	0.08%	0	0	0	164	0.08%	193,506
Narnaul	172,225	89.00%	206	0.11%	20,744	10.72%	3	0.00%	164	0.08%	0	0	0	164	0.08%	193,506
All State	597,488	30.86%	896,021	46.28%	436,539	22.55%	1,592	0.08%	3,101	0.16%	21	12	3	1,482	0.08%	1,936,259

Religious groups in Patiala State (British Punjab province era)
Religious group	1881		1891		1901		1911		1921		1931		1941	
Religious group	Pop.	%	Pop.	%	Pop.	%	Pop.	%	Pop.	%	Pop.	%	Pop.	%
Hinduism (Note: 1931-1941: Including Ad-Dharmis)	734,902	50.08%	942,739	59.53%	880,490	55.14%	563,940	40.06%	642,055	42.81%	623,597	38.36%	597,488	30.86%
Sikhism	408,141	27.81%	285,348	18.02%	355,649	22.27%	532,292	37.81%	522,675	34.85%	632,972	38.94%	896,021	46.28%
Islam	321,354	21.9%	352,046	22.23%	357,334	22.38%	307,384	21.84%	330,341	22.03%	363,920	22.39%	436,539	22.55%
Jainism	2,997	0.2%	3,228	0.2%	2,877	0.18%	3,282	0.23%	3,249	0.22%	3,578	0.22%	3,101	0.16%
Christianity	39	0%	105	0.01%	316	0.02%	739	0.05%	1,395	0.09%	1,449	0.09%	1,592	0.08%
Zoroastrianism	0	0%	55	0%	26	0%	22	0%	21	0%	2	0%	21	0%
Buddhism	0	0%	0	0%	0	0%	0	0%	3	0%	2	0%	3	0%
Judaism	—N/a	—N/a	0	0%	0	0%	0	0%	0	0%	0	0%	12	0%
Others	0	0%	0	0%	0	0%	0	0%	0	0%	0	0%	1,482	0.08%
Total population	1,467,433	100%	1,583,521	100%	1,596,692	100%	1,407,659	100%	1,499,739	100%	1,625,520	100%	1,936,259	100%
Note: British Punjab province era district borders are not an exact match in the present-day due to various bifurcations to district borders — which since created new districts — throughout the historic Punjab Province region during the post-independence era that have taken into account population increases.

== Transport ==
=== Railways ===
The following railway stations were situated within Patiala State territory as per the 1941 Census Report:

Railway Stations in Patiala State Territory (1941)
No.	Railway Line	Stations
1	North Western Railway (Delhi Division)	Taksal, Gumman, Dharampur, Kumarhatti, Barog, Kandaghat, Kanoh, Kathleeg hat, Jatog, Doraha, Gobindgarh, Sirhind, Sadhugarh, Sarai Banjara, Rajpura, Shaubhu, Kauli, Patiala, Kakrala, Chhintawala, Dhuri, Alal, Sekha, Barnala, Hadyaya, Tappa, Rampura Phul, Phusmandi, Kot Fatta, Maisarkhana, Maur, Sadasinghwala, Mansa, Narindrepura, Bareta, Dhamtan, Dhraudi, Narwana, Ghaso, Uchana, Kalayat, Sajuma, Lalru, Surajpore, Fatehgarh Sahib, Bassi, Nagawan
2	North Western Railway (Ferozepore Division)	Sunam, Chhajli, Lehragaga, Gurney, Baluana, Bhatinda, Katarsinghwala
3	Bikaner State Railway	Sangat, Baghwali, Mohindergarh, Zerpurpali, Nanwan, Satnali, Bojawas
4	B B & C I Railway (Sirsa Division)	Shergarh, Raman
5	B B & C I Railway (Bandikui Division)	Narnaul, Nazampur
The following towns are in Himachal Pradesh today: Taksal, Gumman, Dharampur, Kumarhatti, Barog, Kandaghat, Kanoh, Kathleeg hat, and Jatog. The towns that are in Punjab today include: Doraha, Gobindgarh, Sirhind, Sadhugarh, Sarai Banjara, Rajpura, Shaubhu, Kauli, Patiala, Kakrala, Chhintawala, Dhuri, Alal, Sekha, Barnala, Hadyaya, Tappa, Rampura Phul, Phusmandi, Kot Fatta, Maisarkhana, Maur, Sadasinghwala, Mansa, Narindrepura, Bareta, Lalru, Fatehgarh Sahib, Bassi, Sunam, Chhajli, Lehragaga, Gurney, Baluana, Bhatinda, Katarsinghwala, Sangat, Baghwali, and Raman. The following towns are in Haryana today: Dhamtan, Dhraudi, Narwana, Ghaso, Uchana, Kalayat, Sajuma, Mohindergarh, Satnali, Bojawas, Shergarh, Narnaul, Nazampur, Pinjore, Mahendragarh, Nangal Chowdhri, Surajpore, Zerpurpali, Nanwan and Nagawan.

== Orders and decorations ==
The Nishan-i-Phul, Padshahi Phuli Manya Mandal, Yadu Vansha Manya Mandal, Guru Ghar Manya Mandal, and Nishan-i-Iftikhar were orders and decorations conferred by the Maharaja of Patiala.

== Patronage of the arts ==
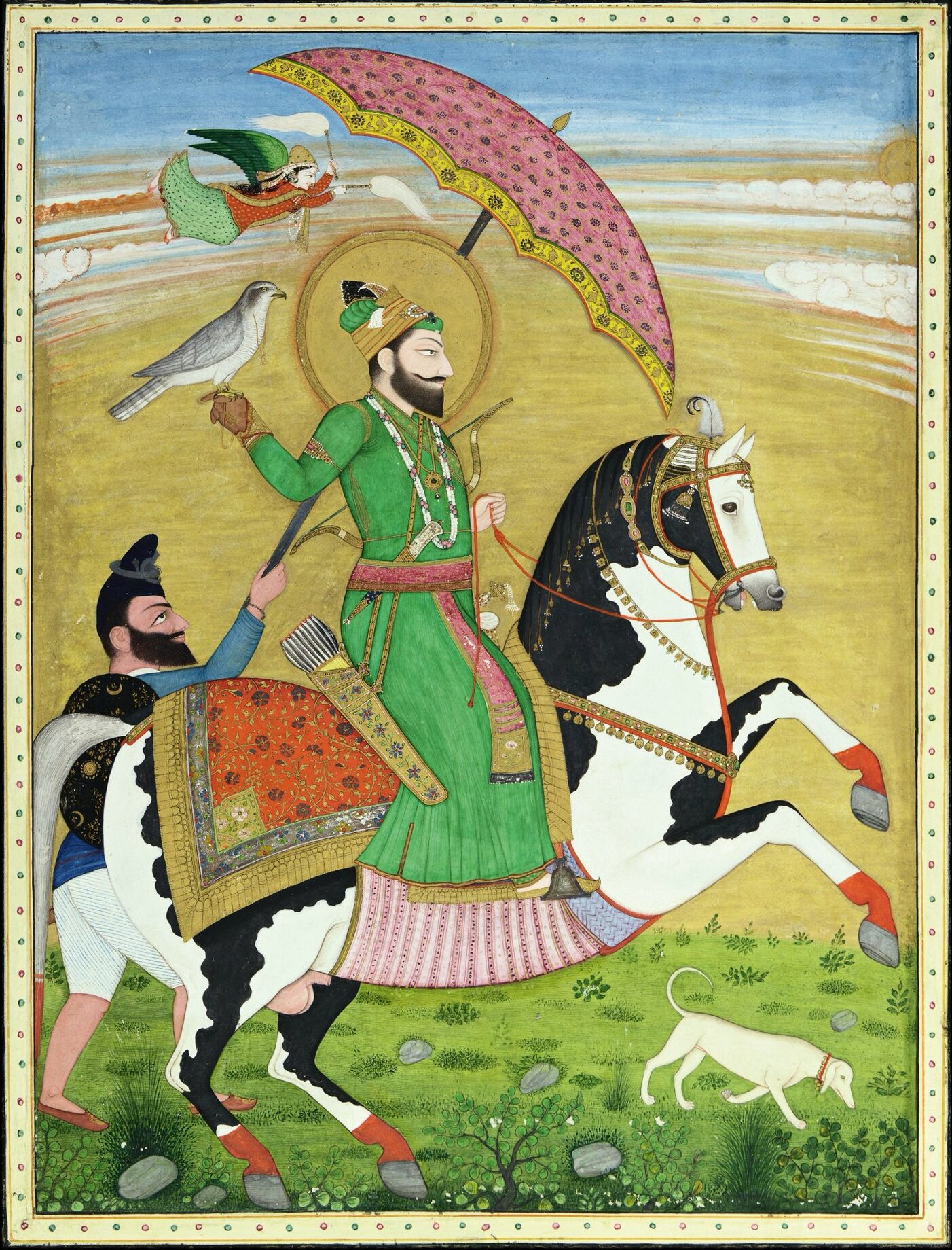
Guru Gobind Singh with a Nihang bodyguard. Ram Chand (attributed), Patiala, Punjab, c. 1830–40. Toor Collection.

Patiala is noted for its patronage of Sikh arts, architecture, and literature. For around the first half century of the state's existence, there were few attempts at producing artwork due to the unstable political and military situation. However, the regional peace and stability in the cis-Sutlej that prevailed after the signing of the 1809 treaty allowed the Patiala rulers to extend their patronage to architectural and artistic projects. This is seen with Maharaja Karam Singh, who undertook a number of projects. Karam Singh invited and hired a number of architects, masons, and artists from Jaipur for his projects. Under Karam Singh's patronage, a number of artists and poets enjoyed patronage. During his reign, the poet Vir Singh Bal wrote the Singh Sagar Granth documenting the life of Guru Gobind Singh and wrote his own unique rendition of the Heer-Ranjha folk-tale titled Heer of Jhang Sial and Ranjha of Takhta Hazara. Ram Singh was given the task of translating the Persian political treatise, the Ikhlaq-e-Mohsin, with the translated work being known as Suniti Prakash. Furthermore, the Sikh poet Santokh Singh enjoyed the patronage of Patiala from 1823 to 1829. Pahari, Rajasthani, and Awadhi artists were invited to Patiala, leading to the formation of a local Patiala school of art, with depictions of both religious and secular themes, mostly using the gouache on paper medium. The patronage of the arts led to a Phulkian sub-type of Sikh architecture, with a key feature being roofs influenced by Bengal roofs rather than onion-style domes. A number of Sikh gurdwaras were constructed in this Phulkian style, although most have subsequently been destroyed in the centuries since due to Kar Seva renovations.

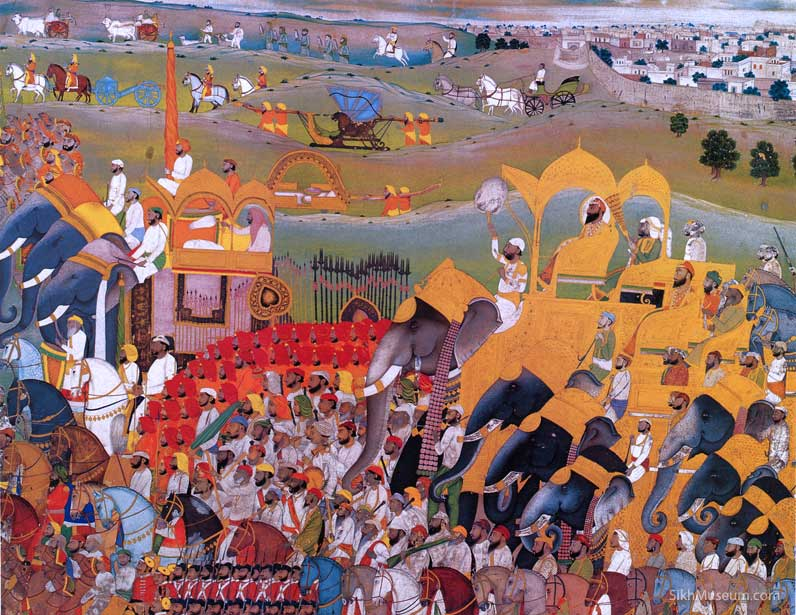
Painting of Maharaja Narinder Singh of Patiala State in procession, c. 1850

This artistic patronage was continued by his son, Maharaja Narinder Singh and by Maharaja Mohinder Singh. After Narinder Singh was awarded with increases in revenue and territory from the British, he expanded his projects, building a number of gardens and structures (including Hindu and Sikh temples) and having them decorated with artwork. Narinder Singh likely maintained an atelier of traditional painters during his reign but was also curious in European artwork. In 1853, Narinder Singh obtained a daguerreotype and tried to have one of his artists trained in its use. The Sheesh Mahal in Patiala was constructed during Narinder Singh's reign, being influenced by both Mughal and European architecture. Mohindra College was established in the 1870s, which offered a Western-style education and being affiliated with the University of Calcutta. Moti Bagh Palace was expanded under Maharaja Bhupinder Singh.

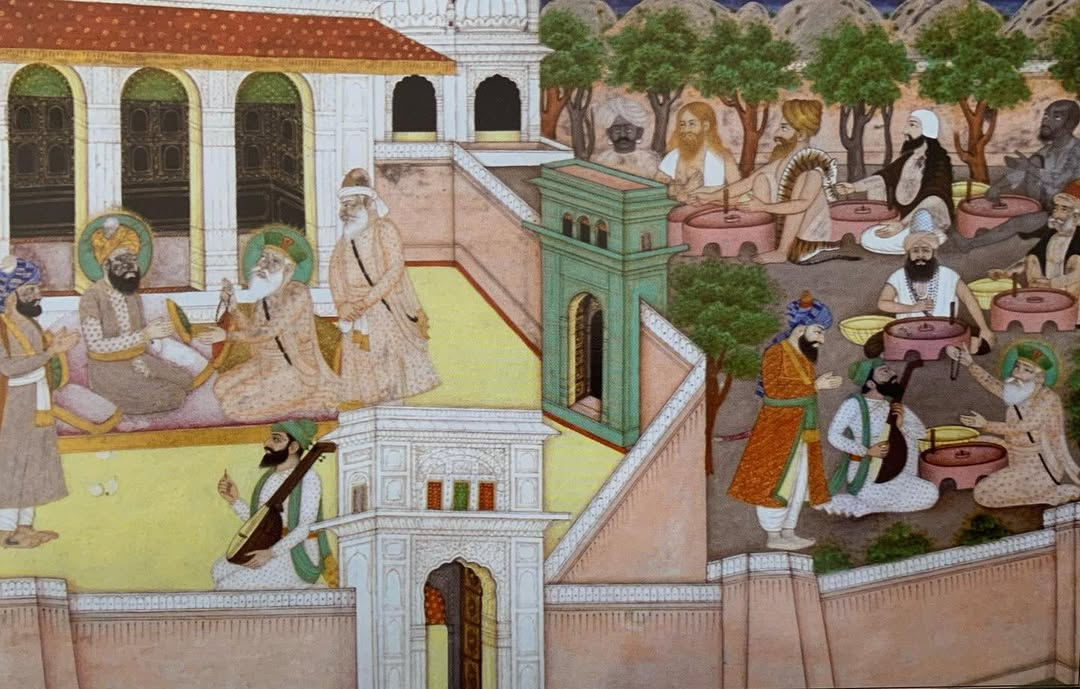
Painting of Guru Nanak imprisoned at Saidpur by Babur, by Basahathullah (Basharat Ullah), circa late 19th century

Patiala was home to artists from Jaipur, the Pahari Hills, and Mughal artists. Due to this diverse source of artists, a number of styles prevailed without the development of a unique Patiala school. Many descendants of the Seu-Nainsukh family, such as Chhajju, Devi Ditta, Kehru, Kehr Chand, and Saudagar, found work in the Patiala atelier. Two members of another Pahari family, named Biba and Gohi (of Guler), also found work in Patiala. The Muslim artists Allah Ditta, his son, Basharat Ullah, and his grandson Muhammad Sharif migrated from Delhi to Patiala to find work. Some Rajasthani artists from the Alwar-Jaipur region, namely Ude Ram Jaipuria, Ganda Baksh, and Sheo Ram, also found work at Patiala. A common literary source used by the Patiala artists for inspiration was the Prabodhachandrodaya, with these paintings serving a talismanic role for the ruling dynasty. Common themes painted by the Patiala artists were Vaishnavist ones, such as the avatars of Krishna and Vishnu. Due to British influences, art patronage later shifted from gilded plasterwork, inlaid mirrors, and murals to simple interiors and oil paintings of royal portraits in the second half of the 19th century. Philip Tennyson Cole was hired by the Maharaja of Patiala to paint him and members of his dynasty, including historical figures, such as Ala Singh. Surviving Patiala paintings can be found in the Darbar Hall of the Qila Mubarak, the Sheesh Mahal Museum and Medal Gallery, and the new Moti Bagh Palace.

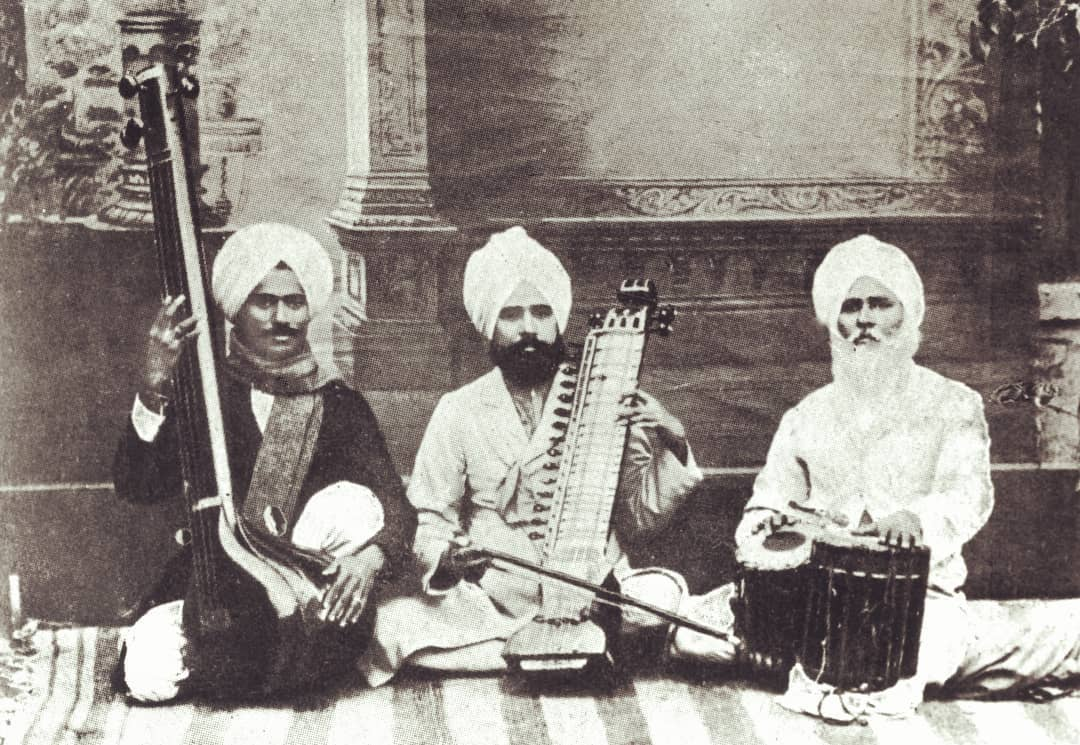
Photograph of the kirtanis Bhai Chhaila, Bhai Ghasita, and Bhai Gopal Singh of the Patiala court, in-attendance at the 2nd All-India Music Conference, Delhi, 1918

The Patiala gharana of classical Indian music developed due to the patronage of the state in the late 19th century under maharajas Rajinder Singh and Bhupinder Singh. Bhupinder Singh commissioned the Patiala Necklace from Cartier.

== Sports ==
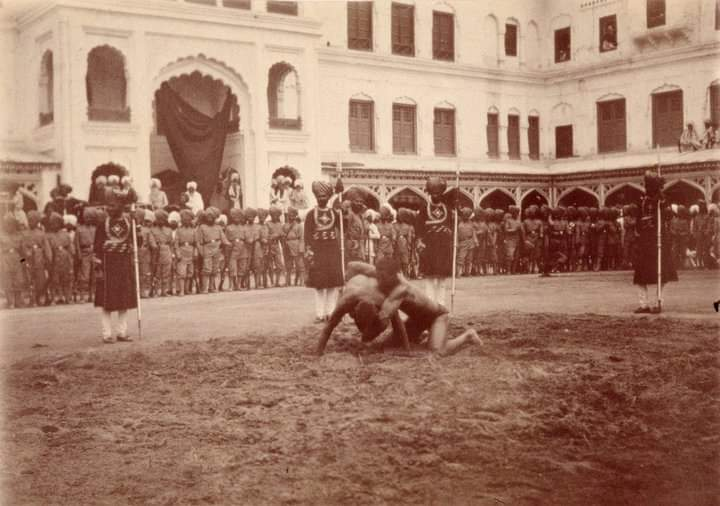
Photograph of a wrestling bout held in the court of Maharaja Bhupinder Singh of Patiala state, c. 1903

The state of Patiala cultivated both indigenous sports, such as shikar (hunting), kushti (wrestling), ghursawari (horsemanship and riding), and martial arts (such as archery, known as tirandazi), and foreign sports, such as cricket, polo, and hockey. Due to the infusement of Sikh martial culture, patronage was afforded to akharas (gymnasiums), which were important for wrestling. Regional wrestling competitions took place at fairs and religious festivals, being tied to the ruling culture. Successful wrestlers were gifted by rulers in various ways, such as financially, materially, or with land and titles. The Patiala rulers arranged an annual wrestling competition on the occasion of Muharram. Wrestlers, known as pehlwans, drew from military, peasant, and artisan backgrounds. According to Saurav Sagar, sports emerged in the princely states as a "performance and negotiation of power" under the British colonial framework, with a reproduction of colonial hierarchies. Western sports, such as cricket and atheletics, were introduced in the region via cantonments and missionary schools, with the Patiala rulers actively promoting these sports by accommodating them architecturally (by constructing playing areas for them) and educationally (training a segment of their population in such sports), however Western sports did not completely displace traditional sports, rather they were an addition to a pre-existing sporting culture as a way to showcase the state's modernity. Sports emerged as a medium to cultivate relations between British officials, Indian elites, and international players.

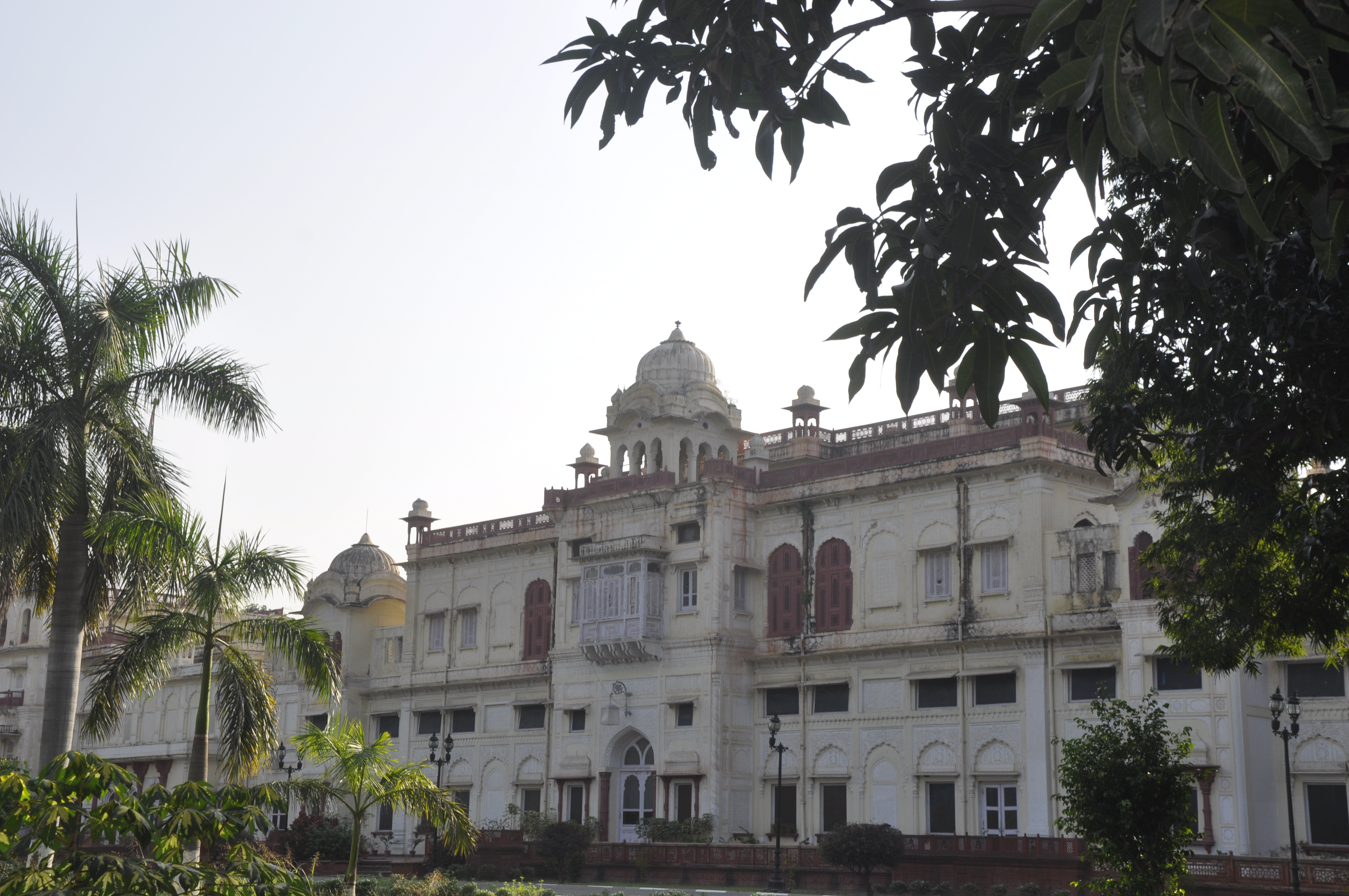
This is the old Moti Bagh palace that belonged to the royal family of Patiala and after independence was purchased by the Government of India. It now houses Asia's largest sports institute, National Institute of Sports (NIS)

Maharaja Rajinder Singh was an avid promoter of cricket and polo. Polo was introduced to the state in 1889 via Raja Gurdit Singh being encouraged by Dholpuris. By 1894, it became a staple of the state's sporting culture, being supported by state's military and aristocracy class. In 1934, Maharaja Bhupinder Singh was the President of the Cricket Club of India and of the Indian Olympic Association, with him financially supporting polo, cricket, and hockey. He funded the construction of the Brabourne Stadium and assisted with the foundation of an Indian cricket tournament, the Ranji Trophy. Chail as Patiala's summer capital became a centre for cricket. The state's polo team was the Patiala Tigers with a number of playing areas dedicated to the sport, such as the Polo Ground area, the Raja Bhalindra Sports Complex, and the Yadavindra Sports Stadium. The polo team won the 1910 Shimla season and the Duke of Connaught’s Cup. In the 1920s, the state's polo team participated in Delhite tournaments. A notable polo player for the state was Chanda Singh. Hockey was introduced to the state in the early 20th century, with Patiala teams participating in hockey tournaments in the 1920s. While polo was tied more with royal aristocracy under colonial purview, hockey was associated more with Indian nationalism. Bhupinder Singh was also a promoter of traditional wrestling, such as him offering patronage to the popular wrestler Ghulam Mohammad Baksh, known as the Great Gama. This wrestler, who was trained at and based in Patiala, achieved worldwide acclaim after a 1910 campaign in London and in 1928 after he defeated Stanislaus Zbyszko in Patiala. Bhupinder Singh's successor, Yadvinder Singh, founded the National Institute of Sports at Moti Bagh Palace in 1958, which later became the Netaji Subhas National Institute of Sports. Patiala remains a centre for Indian sports due to its sporting infrastructure (stadiums and akharas), institutions (NIS), and culture, such as via the Maharaja Bhupinder Singh Punjab Sports University. However, there is a prevalence of performance enhancer and steroid use.

== Gallery ==
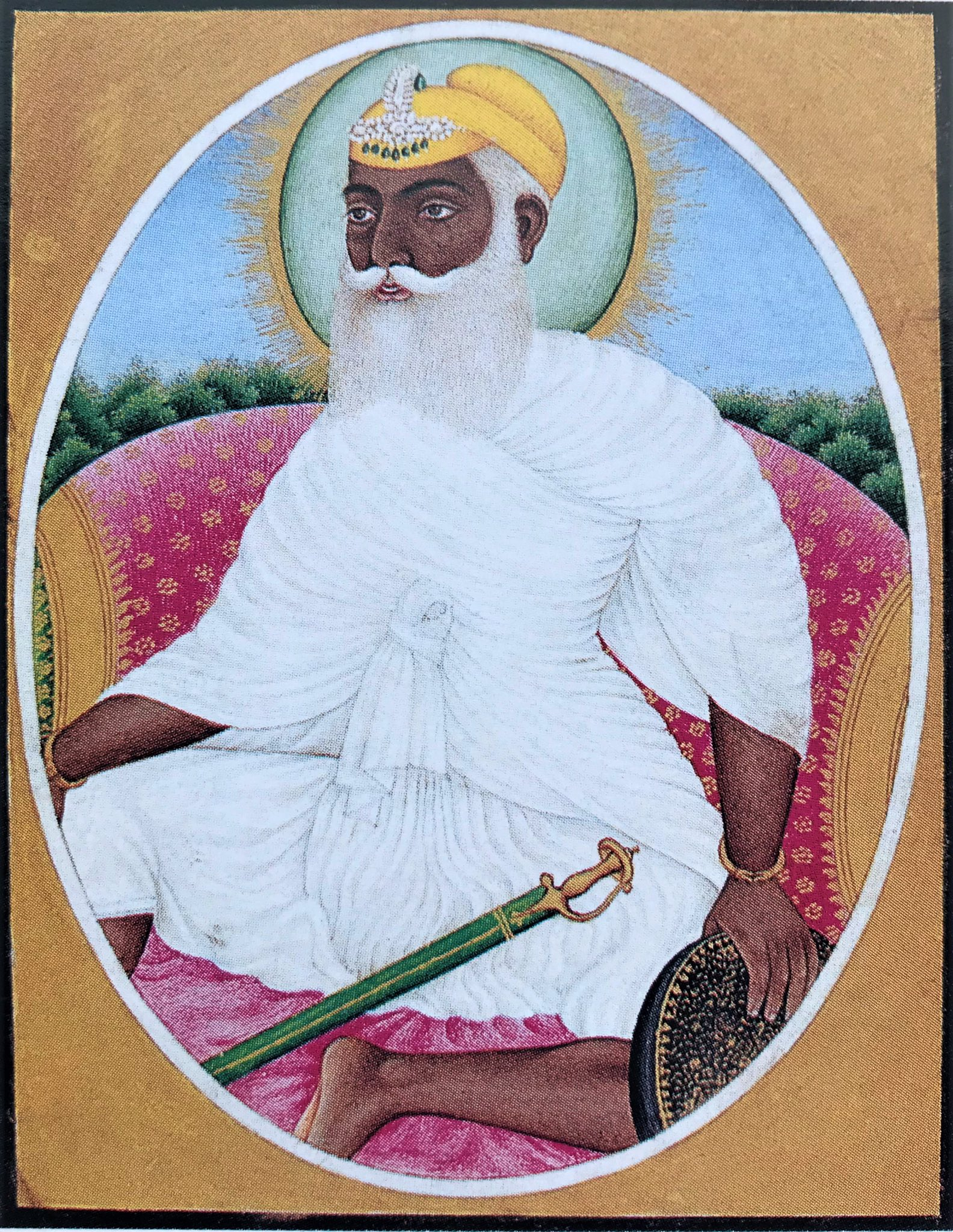
Ala Singh, the founder and first ruler of Patiala

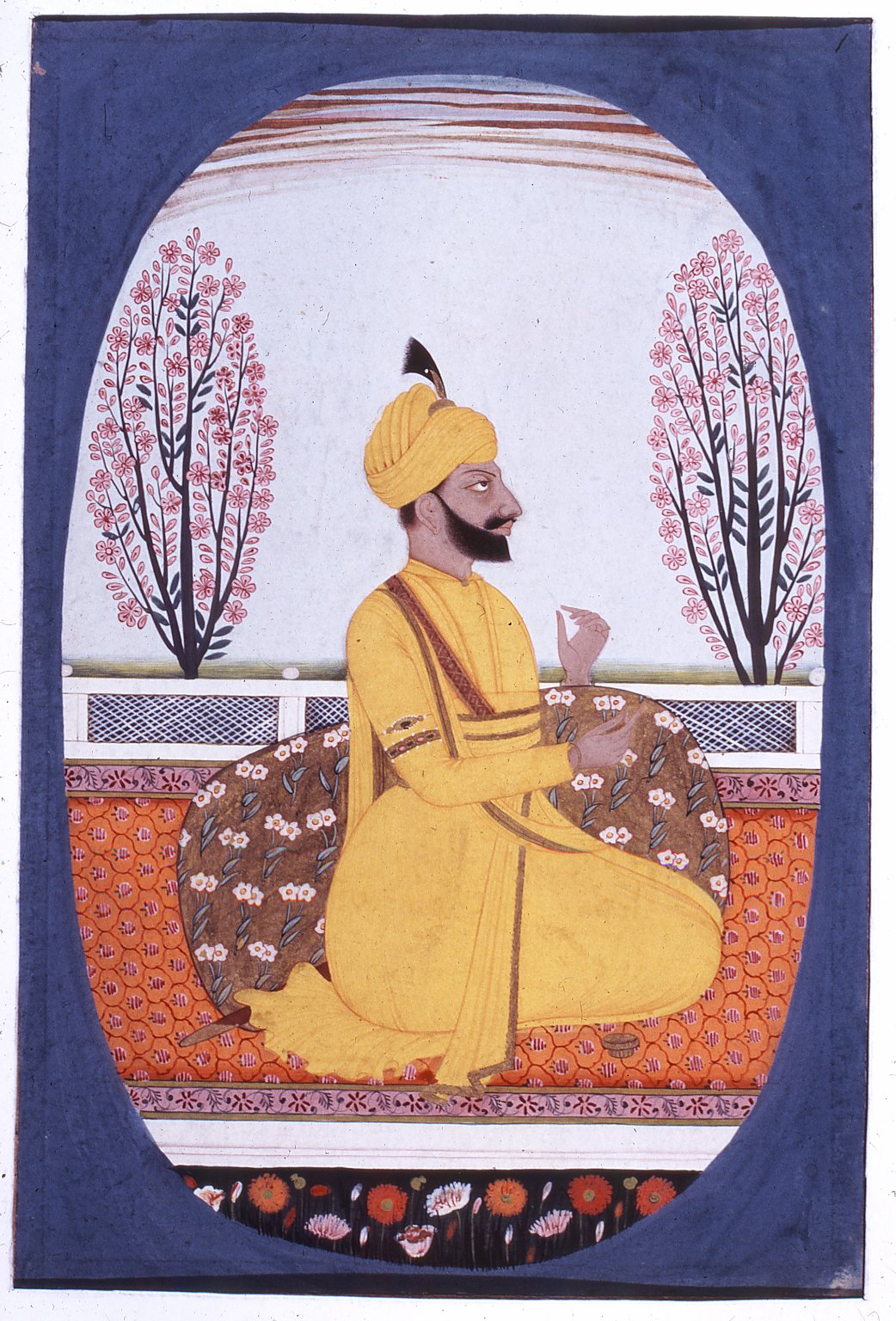
Miniature painting of Raja-e Rajgan Amar Singh of Patiala, ca.1830

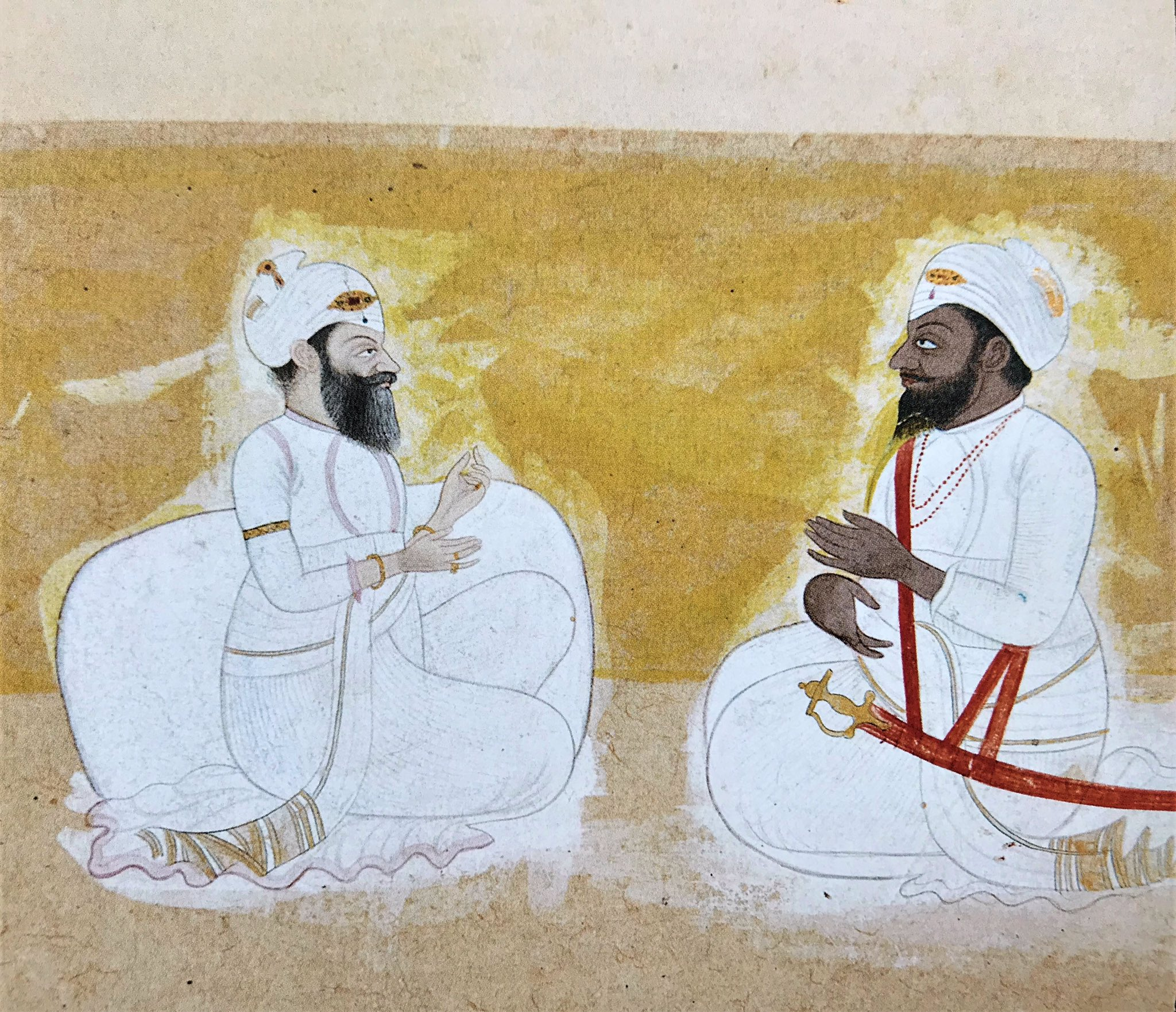
Sardar Jassa Singh Ramgarhia on left and Amar Singh of Patiala on right, late 18th century

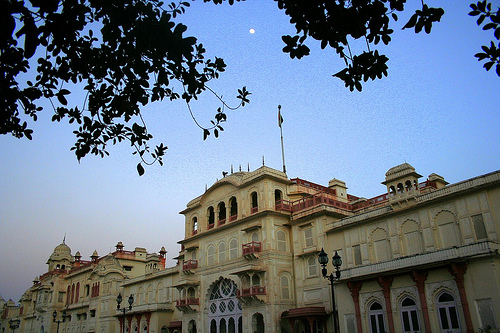
Moti Bagh Palace, Patiala.

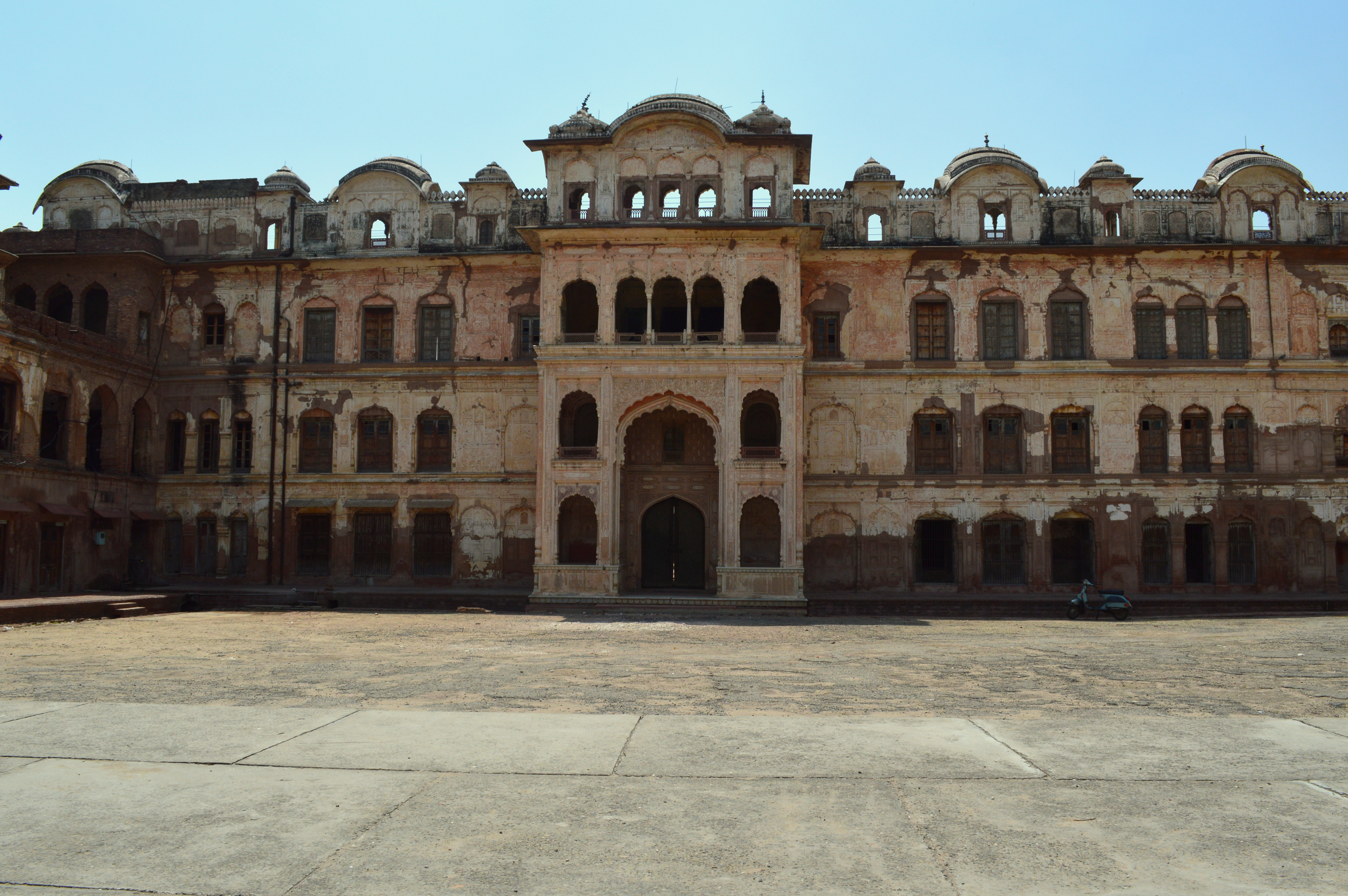
The main gate of the Qila Mubarak

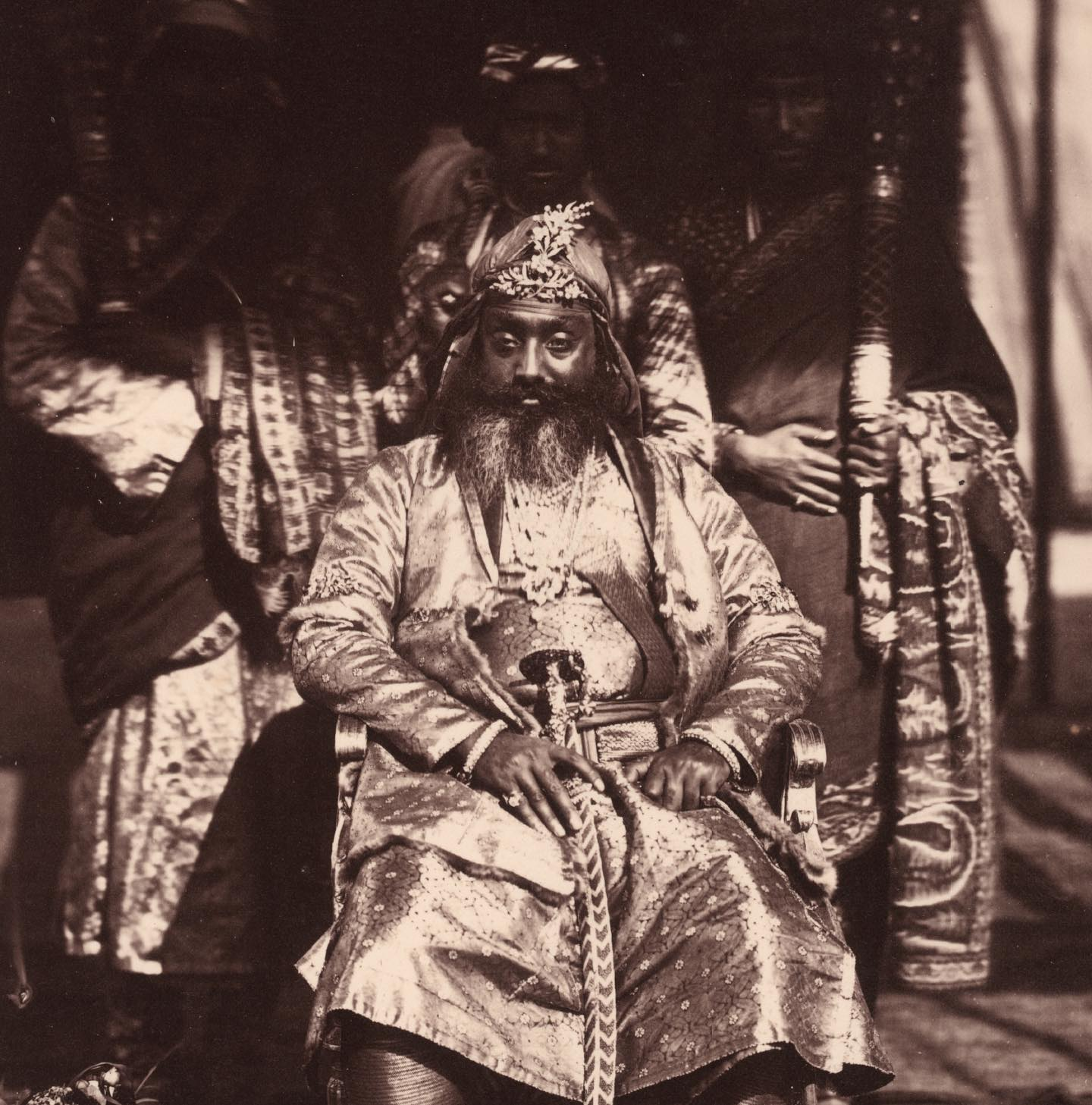
Maharaja Narinder Singh of Patiala

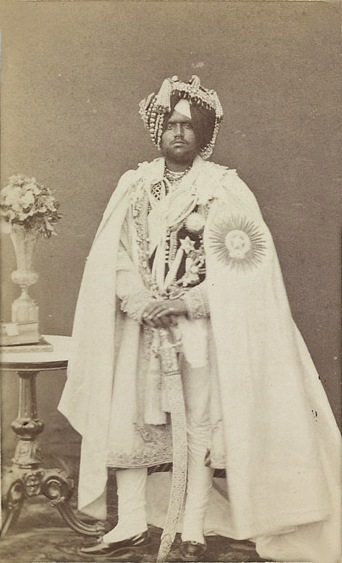
Maharaja Mahendra Singh of Patiala

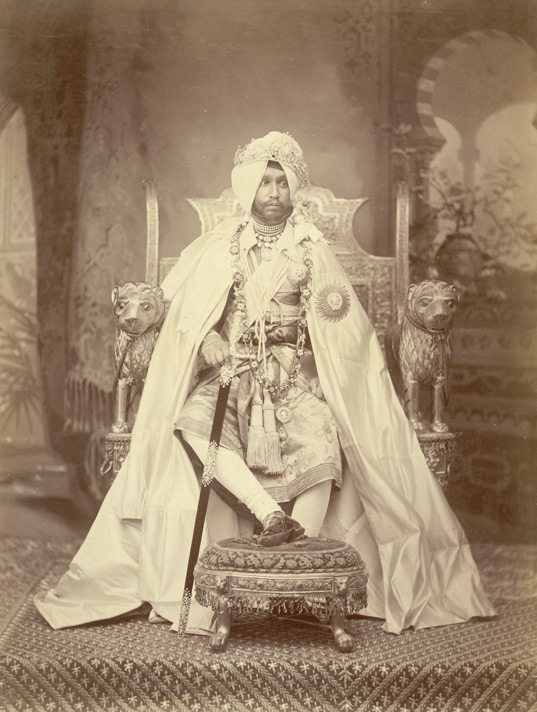
Maharaja Rajinder Singh of Patiala

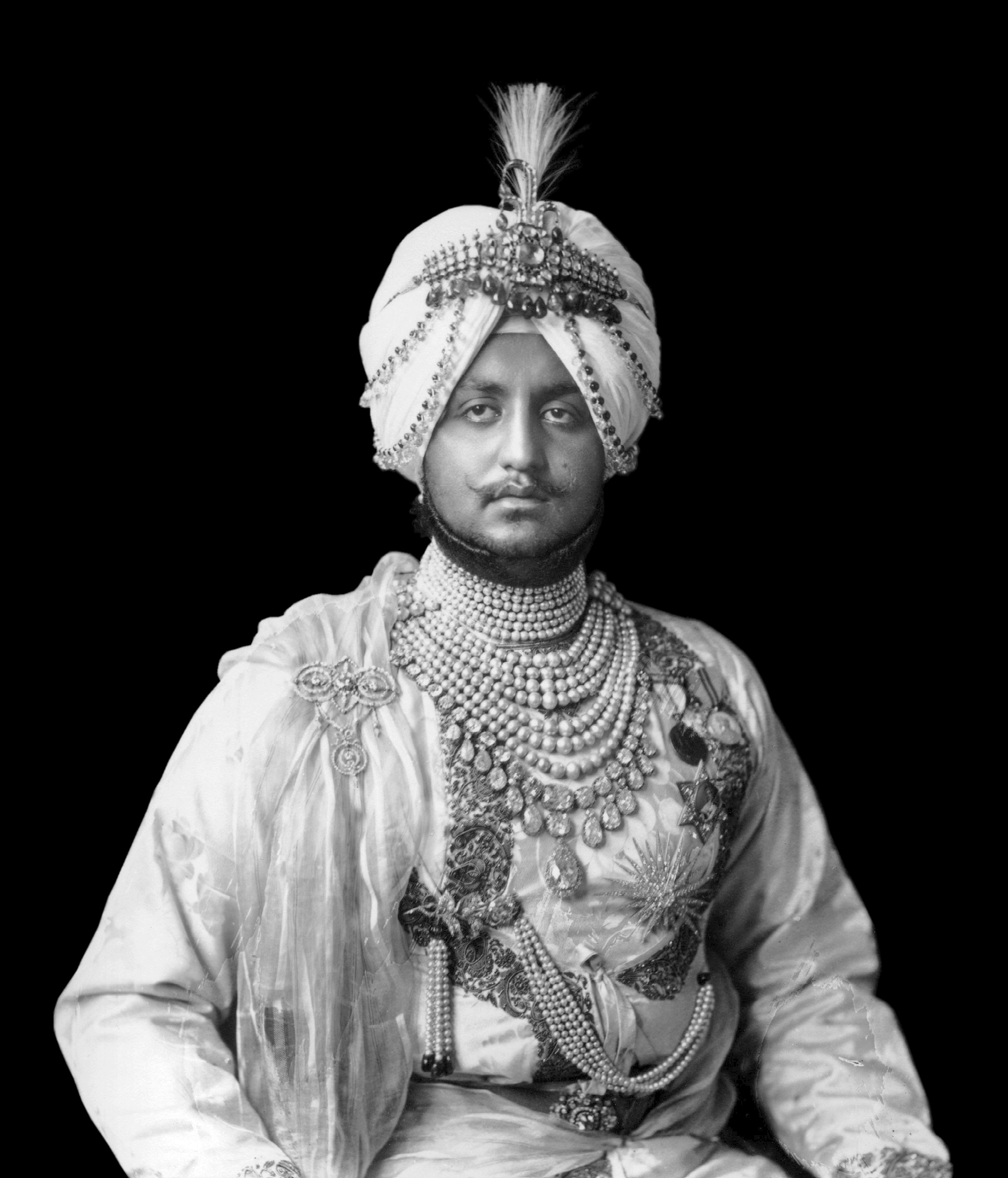
Maharaja Bhupinder Singh of Patiala

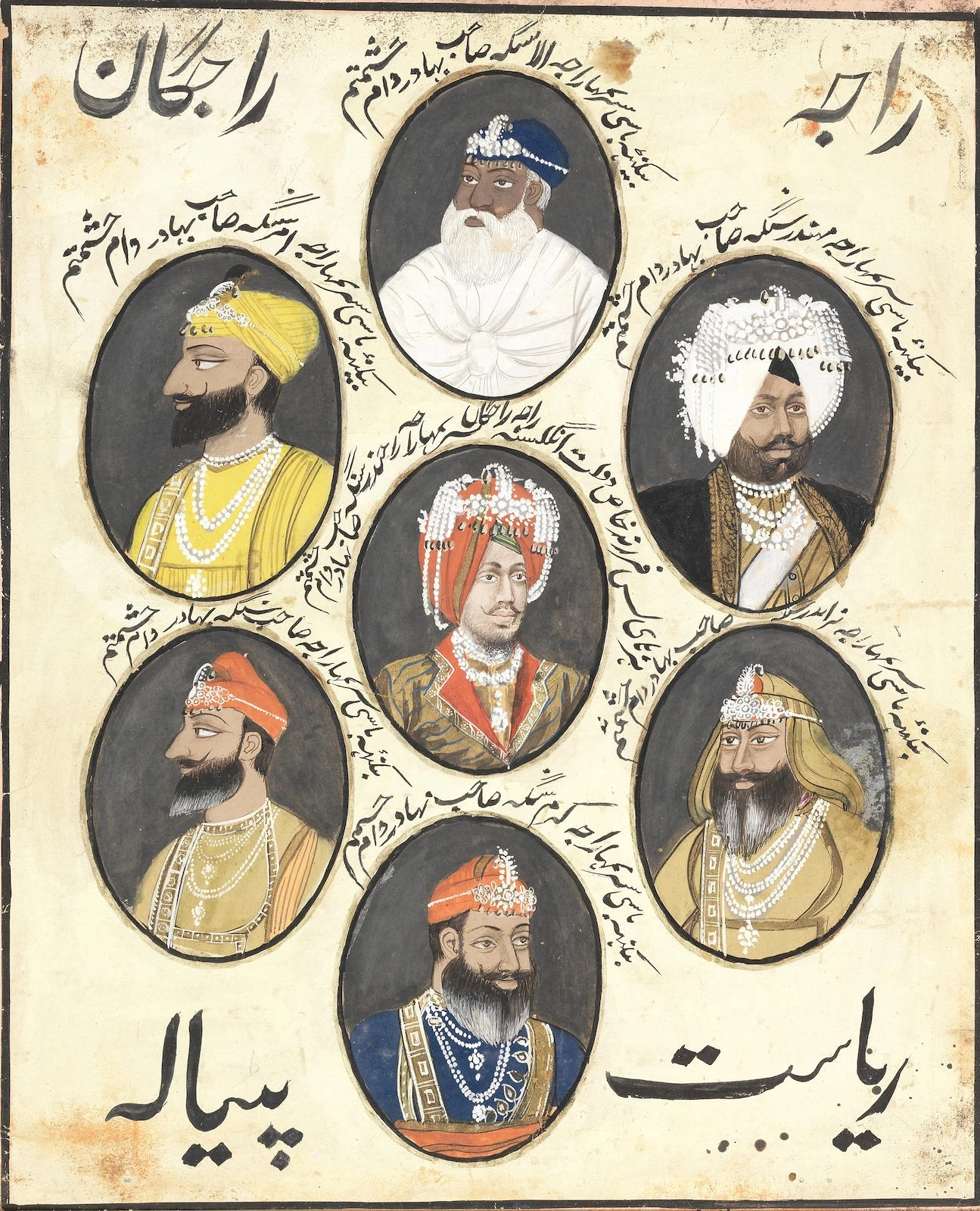
A panel of seven portraits of rulers of Patiala State

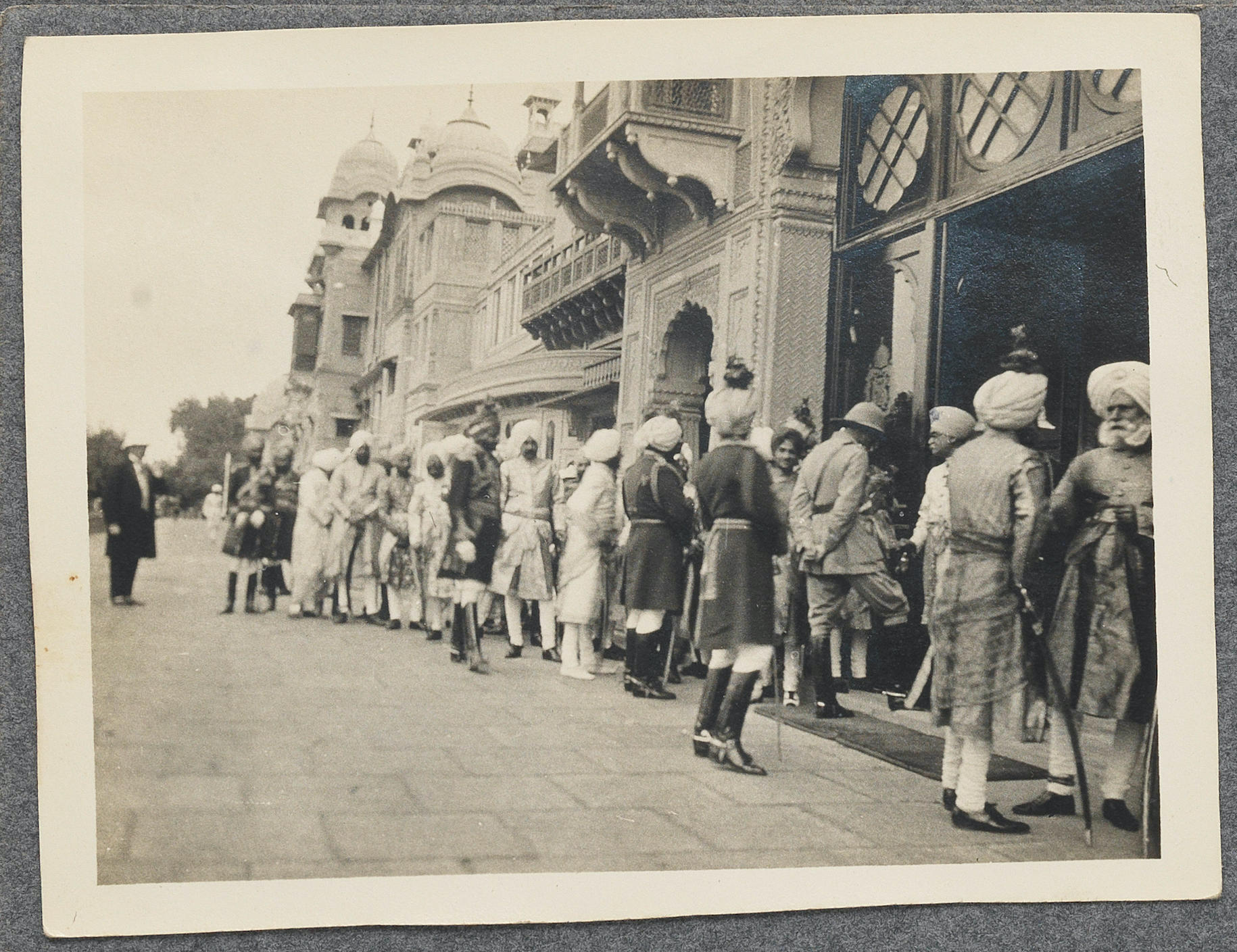
Informal visit at Moti Bagh Palace, from a photo album by the wife of Dr. H.R. Hunter, dental surgeon during Maharajah Bhupinder Singh's reign, c. 1922–23.

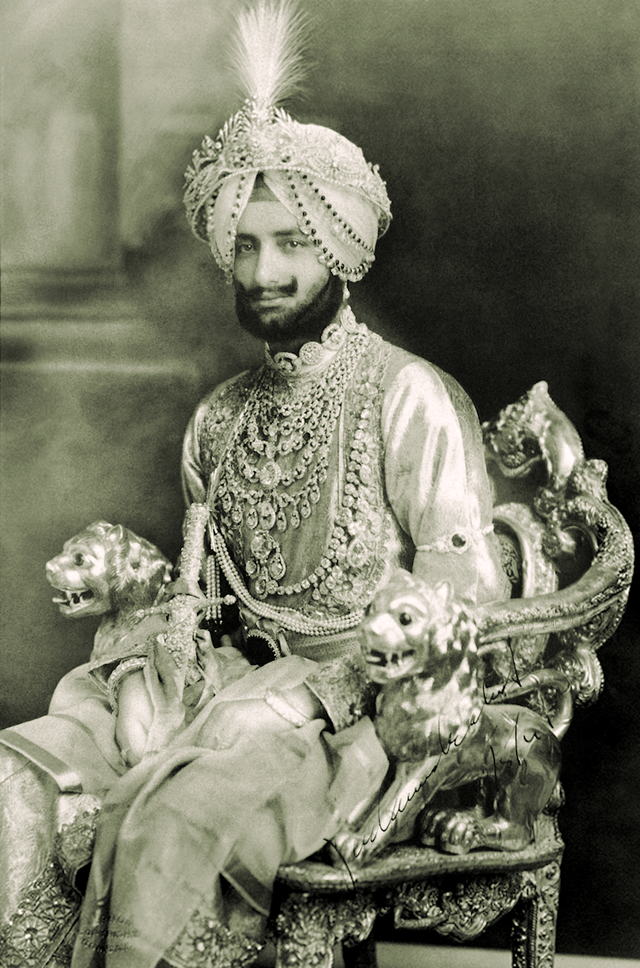
Yadavindra Singh, the last Maharaja of Patiala

== See also ==
- Maharaja of Patiala
- Patiala State Monorail Trainways
- Political integration of India
- Phulkian sardars
- Nabha State
- Jind State
- Faridkot State
- Malaudh
- Bhadaur
- Kaithal
- Cis-Sutlej states
- Nanu Singh Saini
- 85 (Patiala) Field Battery
