= Nishan-i-Phul =

Dynastic order of Patiala

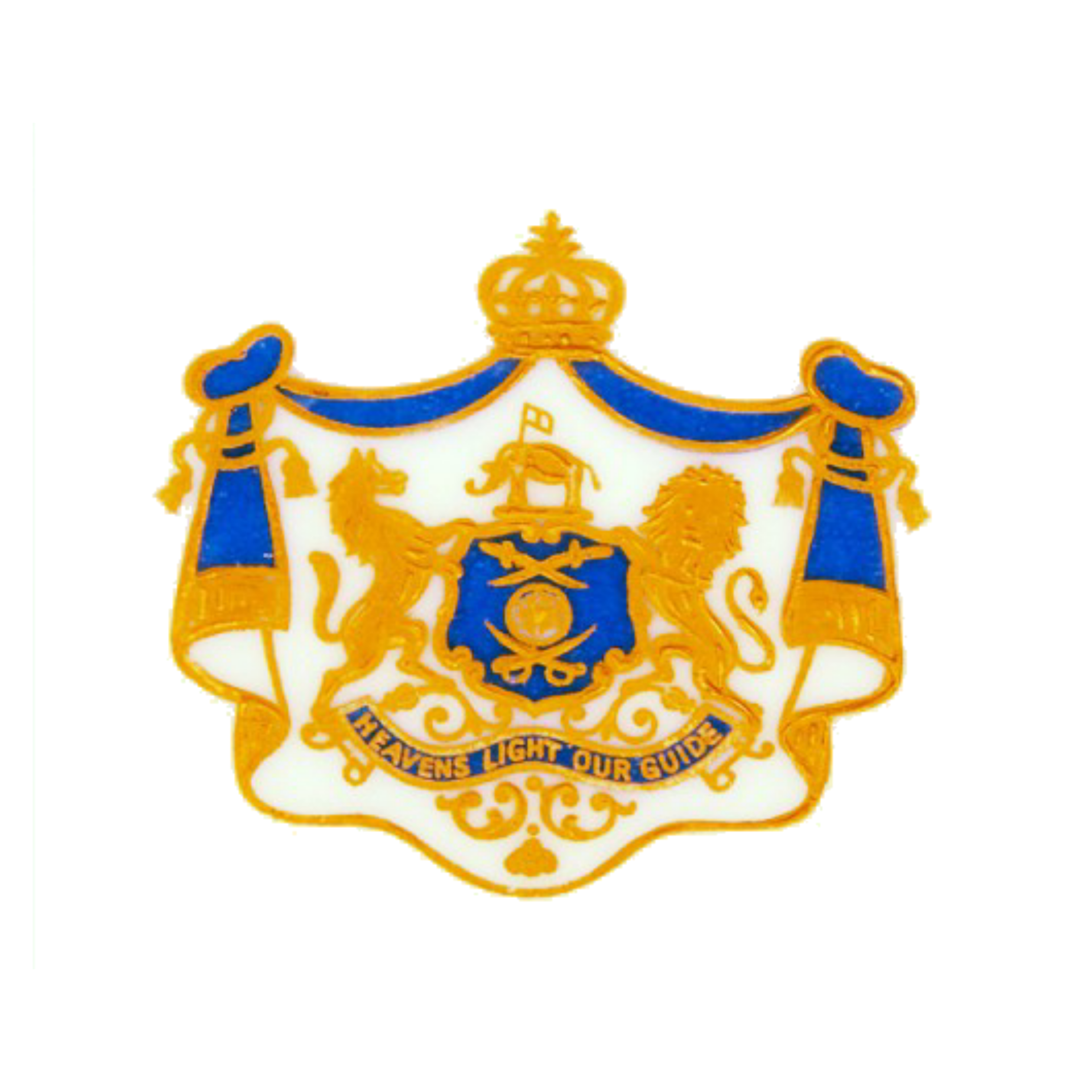
Awarded by the Maharaja of Patiala
- Type: Order
- Established: c. 1911
- Country: Patiala State
- Motto: Tera Ghar Mera Aseh
- Status: Dormant since 1947
- Founder: Bhupinder Singh
- Sovereign: Amarinder Singh

Nishan-i-Phul (Urdu: نشانِ پھول, lit. 'Order of Phul') was an order conferred by the Maharaja of Patiala.

== Description ==
Like the rulers of Jind and Nabha, the Maharaja of Patiala also claimed descent from Phul. As such, they were collectively referred to as the Phulkian states. Ala Singh, the progenitor of the Patiala royal family, was a grandson of Phul. The order takes its name from the founding father of the dynasty.

This order was instituted by Bhupinder Singh around 1911. It was conferred upon male members of the Phulkian dynasty. The Order comprises two classes: First and Second. It bore the following inscription in Gurmukhi script: Tera Ghar Mera Aseh (transl. Your home is my refuge/abode).

It was manufactured by the London-based jewellers Garrard & Co. Limited. Bhagwan Singh Harika was awarded it in October 1934. Sardar Narain Singh also received the order in recognition of his loyal service and the merits of his family.

== See also ==
- Padshahi Phuli Manya Mandal
- Yadu Vansha Manya Mandal
- Guru Ghar Manya Mandal
