= Yadu Vansha Manya Mandal =

Order of Patiala State

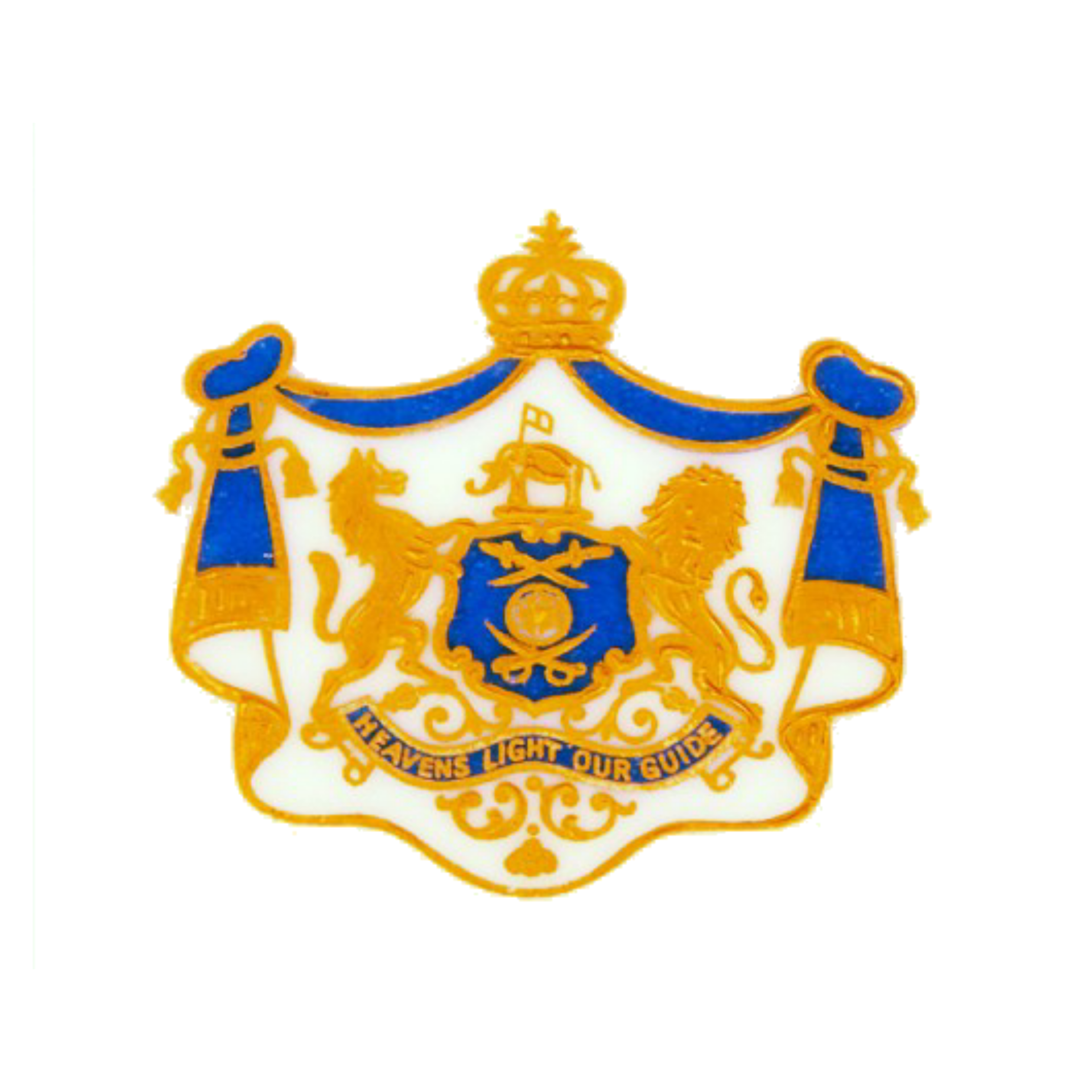
Awarded by the Maharaja of Patiala
- Type: Order
- Established: c. 1933
- Country: Patiala State
- Status: Dormant since 1947
- Founder: Bhupinder Singh
- Sovereign: Amarinder Singh

Yadu Vansha Manya Mandal was an order conferred by the Maharaja of Patiala.

== Description ==
The earliest ancestors of the Maharaja of Patiala were members of the royal house of Jaisalmer. The Maharaja traced his lineage to Jaisalmer’s founder, Jaisal. In turn, the Maharawal of Jaisalmer claimed descent from Krishna, and through him, from Yadu. Among the titles of the Maharaja of Patiala was Yadu Vansha Vatans (transl. a scion of the Yaduvansh).

This order was established by Bhupinder Singh in 1933. It was also known as the Order of Krishna. It was primarily awarded to Hindus. The number of recipients was limited to five at any one time, including foreign sovereigns and their consorts, ruling princes, heirs apparent, and ministers of state. The order comprised three classes: Sovereign Grand Master, Members, and Honorary Members.

== See also ==
- Nishan-i-Phul
- Padshahi Phuli Manya Mandal
- Guru Ghar Manya Mandal
