= Padshahi Phuli Manya Mandal =

Royal Family Order of Patiala

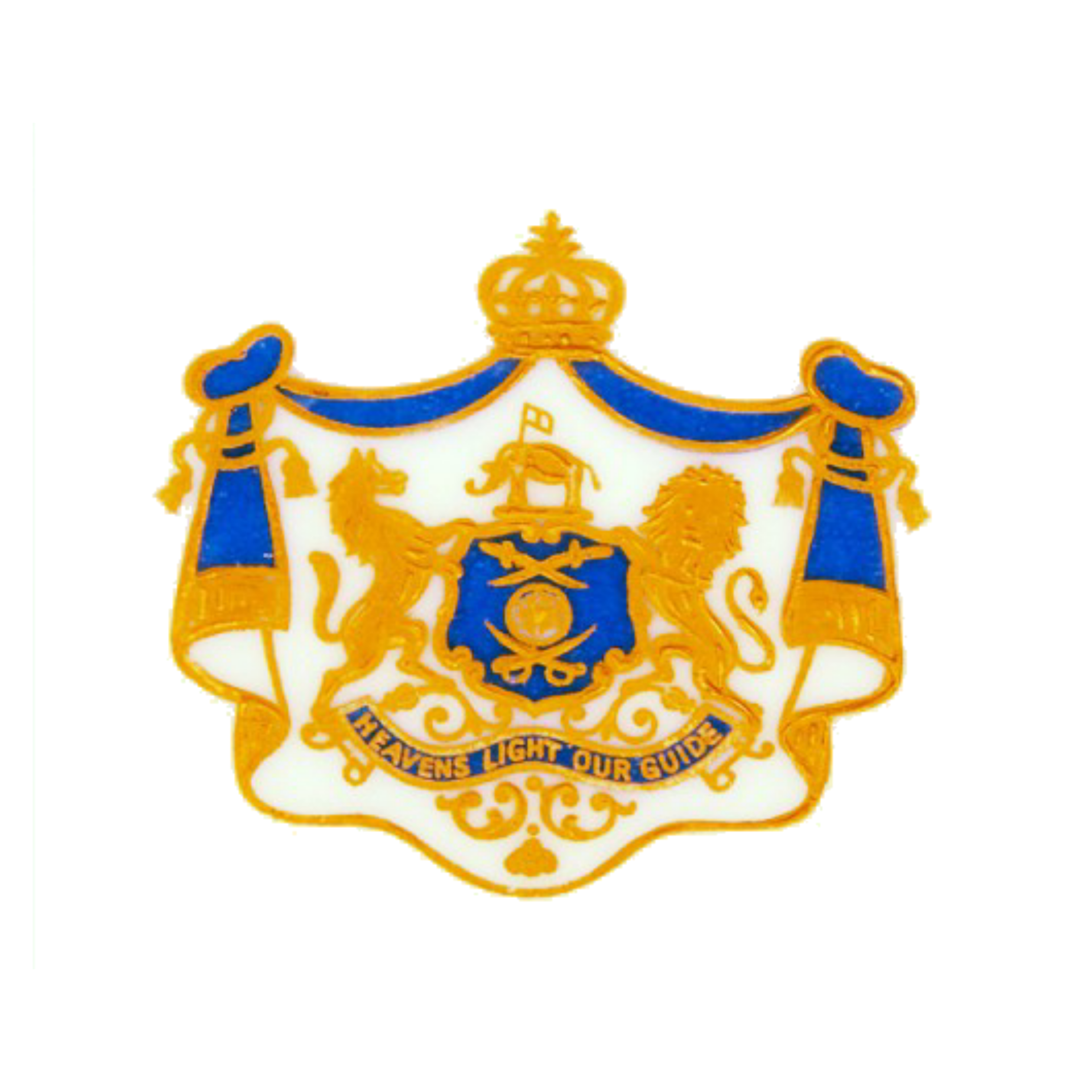
Awarded by the Maharaja of Patiala
- Type: Royal Family Order
- Established: c. 1918
- Country: Patiala State
- Eligibility: at the Maharaja's pleasure
- Status: Dormant since 1947
- Founder: Bhupinder Singh
- Sovereign: Amarinder Singh

Padshahi Phuli Manya Mandal (or Royal Phulkian Family Order) was an order conferred as a sign of personal esteem by the Maharaja of Patiala.

== Description ==
This order was instituted by Bhupinder Singh around 1918. It was awarded in recognition of personal services to the household of the Maharaja of Patiala. The Order consists of six classes: Knight Grand Commander, Knight Commander, Commander, Officer, Member of the Fifth Class, and Member of the Sixth Class.

It bore the following inscription in Gurmukhi script: Pachhmi Padshah Phooli Phali Raha Phuli Ki Bari (transl. May the House of Phul prosper for ever).

== See also ==
- Nishan-i-Phul
- Yadu Vansha Manya Mandal
- Guru Ghar Manya Mandal
