= Guru Ghar Manya Mandal =

Order of Patiala State

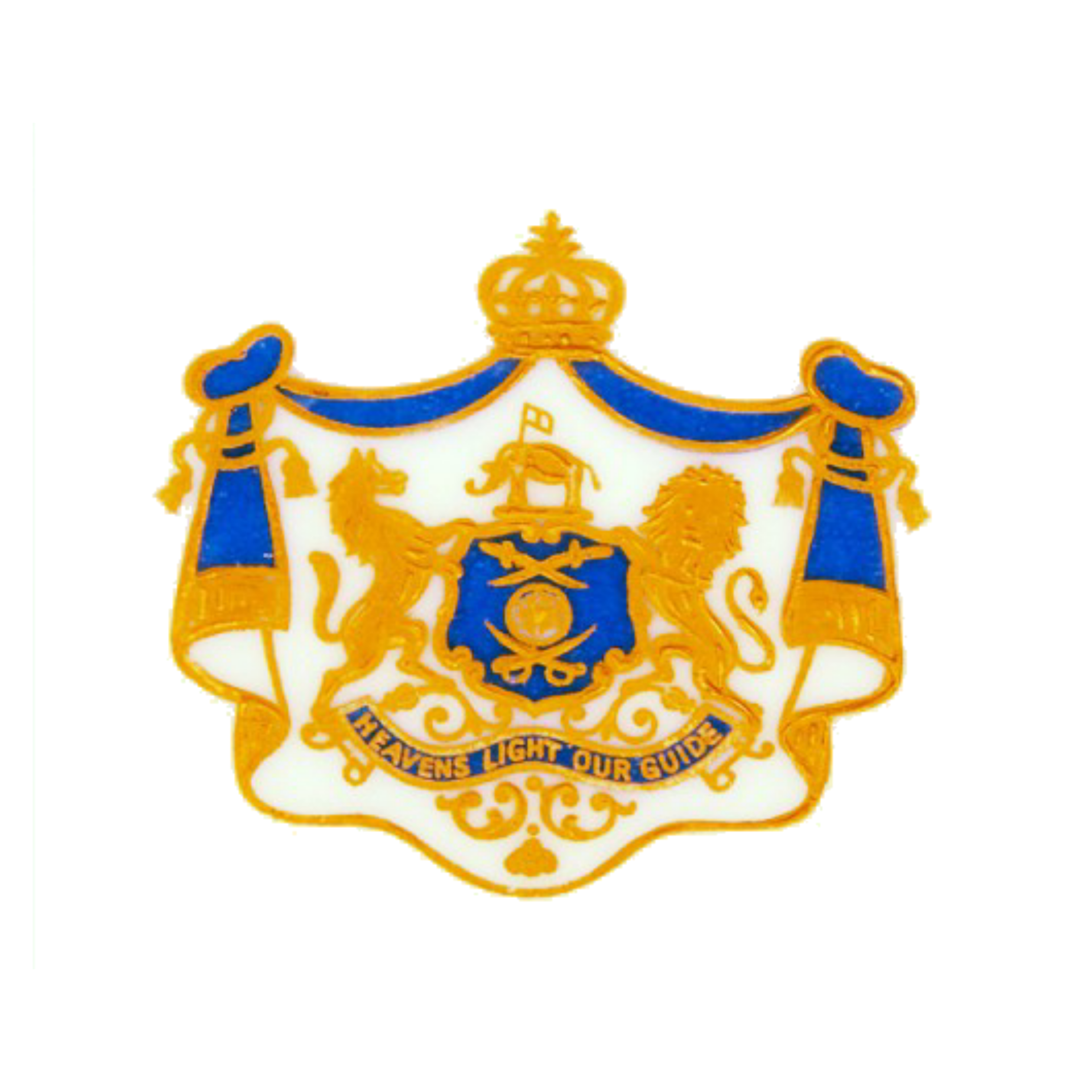
Awarded by the Maharaja of Patiala
- Type: Order
- Established: c. 1933
- Country: Patiala State
- Motto: Ik Onkar; Deg Tegh Fateh
- Status: Dormant since 1947
- Founder: Bhupinder Singh
- Sovereign: Amarinder Singh

Guru Ghar Manya Mandal (Urdu: گرو گھر مانیا منڈل, lit. 'Order of the Holy Saint') was an order conferred by the Maharaja of Patiala.

== Description ==
This order was established in 1933 by Bhupinder Singh, the Maharaja of Patiala. It was awarded to Sikhs and comprised the following classes: Sovereign Grand Master, Members, and Honorary Members. The number of recipients was limited to five at any one time. The Maharaja of Patiala was a Sikh, and his house had been blessed by the tenth Sikh Guru, Guru Gobind Singh.

It bore a portrait of Guru Gobind Singh. The image was set within an oval frame, showing him dressed in saffron-yellow robes, seated and resting against a royal cushion. He held an arrow in his left hand, while a falcon perched on his gloved right hand. Above the portrait, the following inscription appeared in Gurmukhi: Ik Onkar; Deg Tegh Fateh (transl. One God; Victory to Charity and Arms). Below the portrait, the words Sache Badshah (transl. The True King) were inscribed.

== See also ==
- Nishan-i-Phul
- Padshahi Phuli Manya Mandal
- Yadu Vansha Manya Mandal
