= Karmgarh =

Karamgarh
- Village
- Location in India
- Coordinates: 30.414531°N 75.607714°E
- Country: India
- State: Punjab
- District: Barnala
- Postal code: 148101

Karamgarh is a village in the Barnala district, Punjab, India. The village is about 10 kilometres (6.2 mi) far from the city of Barnala, on the Barnala to Malerkotla road. The revenue records and census reports of year 1901 show that the area of nizamat of Karamgarh was 1834sq miles which included four towns and 665 villages with a population of 500,635 people and a population of 273.0 per square mile.

Gurbakshish Singh of Karamgarh won MLA elections from Barnala in 1962 and was a notable figure of that area. Karamgarh was a nizamat under the Patiala state before independence of India and was administered by Raja Dewan Singh of Karamgarh during the era of Maharaja Ranjit Singh and Karam Singh who was the Maharaja of Patiala from 1813-1845 and was a descendant of Baba Ala Singh the founder of Patiala.

The village is named after Maharaja Karam Singh who was Maharaja of Patiala as he succeeded to the gadi from Maharaja Sahib Singh on 30 June 1813 and ruled until his death in 1845. The village was earlier known as Dewangarh after the then ruler and administrator Raja Dewan Singh.k
