= Thomas O'Brien Butler =

Irish composer

Thomas O'Brien Butler (3 November 1861 – 7 May 1915; lost on the Lusitania), was an Irish composer who wrote the Irish-language opera Muirgheis (1903).

== Biography ==
O'Brien Butler, as he was generally known, was born in Cahersiveen, County Kerry, the youngest child of Pierce Butler (c.1804–1873), a shopkeeper in the village, and Ellen Webb (c.1818–1876). There is no source for his correct surname. Baker's Dictionary indicates that his surname was Whitwell; when he registered at the Royal College of Music in London, his name was noted as Thomas Whitwell-Butler. He does not seem to have been directly related to another O'Brien Butler family from Ireland who lost three brothers in World War I. He does however claim heritage to Lady Margaret O'Brien in his collection Seven Original Irish Melodies dedicating the first song 'Kincora; or the Lament for King Brian' to "My Great Mother Lady Margaret O'Brien, daughter of Donough O'Brien, Earl of Thomond."

Before going to London he grew up in an environment steeped in traditional music. His musical education began in Italy, but it is not known when and where exactly. He enrolled at the Royal College of Music in February 1897 at the rather advanced age of 35 and stayed for three terms only, studying composition with Charles Villiers Stanford and Walter Parratt. Baker's Dictionary also says that Butler travelled extensively and spent some time in India, where his opera Muirgheis was written, but it is not certain whether these travels took place before or after his London studies. A song composition published in Dublin in 1900 is dedicated to "His Highness Rajendrah Singh, Maharajah of Patiala" (see 'Selected works'). In an obituary, the Kerry Evening Post confirms that Muirgheis was written in Kashmir, northern India. After around 1900 he mainly lived in Kilmashogue, in the mountains above Rathfarnham, Dublin, in a house he had called Muirgheis.

After settling in Dublin, O'Brien Butler tried to align himself with some of Ireland's leading cultural figures. The diary entries of Lady Gregory indicate that in May 1900 he met with W.B. Yeats and George Moore in order to join the Celtic movement, although both were unimpressed by his talents. He did however find more support from the Gaelic League, which promoted his opera Muirgheis in their publication An Claidheanh Soluis.

Butler died during World War I, when a German torpedo hit the passenger vessel Lusitania on 7 May 1915 just off the southern Irish coast near Kinsale. Butler was on his way back from New York. Baker's Dictionary (1958 edition) claimed that he was on his way home from a concert performance of Muirgheis in New York, while other sources suggest he was returning from making "tentative arrangements for the production of his opera the following year". A photograph of the composer from the Cork Examiner, 11 May 1915, was reprinted in a 2004 documentary book. The Evening Ledger newspaper reported on 8 April 1915 under a photo of a moustachioed O'Brien Butler in a fez that "He wrote the music for the first purely Irish opera which has been produced in this country".

A friend of Thomas MacDonagh, O'Brien Butler was working on a trio of operas in Irish with him when he died in the Lusitania; MacDonagh died the next year, executed by a British Army firing squad after the Easter Rising.

== Music ==
Butler wrote a number of songs and some chamber music, but Muirgheis remained his only major score. The plot of the opera abounds in Celticist clichés featuring "names redolent of Irish mythology such as Diarmuid, Donn, and a number of sea fairies", taking place "at the dawn of Christianity". The music makes use of pentatonic scales and numerous melodic and rhythmic allusions to Irish traditional music, but only once quotes from an original Irish lament in a tune Butler claimed he had known from his childhood. Muirgheis was promoted as "The first Irish opera." The libretto was written by Nora Chesson in English, and was translated to Irish by Tadhg Ó Donnchadha in 1909. The vocal score of 1910, published by Breitkop and Hartel contains both the English libretto and Irish translation. As the opera was only performed in 1903, using the English libretto, the first opera to be performed in the Irish language was actually Eithne (1909) by Robert O'Dwyer.

The reception of the work, particularly in terms of its musical quality, was highly controversial – both after a performance of excerpts in June 1902 and after its full performance in December 1903. A critic in the Irish Times wrote: "One would fain encourage Irish art, but it must be confessed that Muirgheis does not possess the elements of popularity. We do not think that it is more characteristically Irish than Stanford's Shamus O'Brien. […] Mr O'Brien Butler has not yet attained the art of writing a good opera." Another critic wrote "We are very sorry to have to criticise so severely a work intended to be thoroughly Irish. But it would be a bad service to Irish music to praise a composition merely because it is Irish." Others including John Millington Synge and Edward Martyn had more positive views.

The few other compositions by Butler that survived are small-scale chamber music pieces and songs, which, like the opera, make obvious attempts at reconciling Irish and European musical traditions. His Irish Sonata (1904) for violin and piano was championed by Arthur Darley for many years, while the song Kincora from the Seven Original Irish Melodies (1903) was a test piece for soprano at the Feis Ceoil (Irish competitive music festival) in May 1915.

== Selected works ==
- My Little Red Colleen (Mo Cailin Beag Ruadh), Irish Song ("Ita's Laureate"), Dublin: Pohlmann & Co. 1900 ("Dedicated to His Highness Rajendrah Singh, Maharajah of Patiala G.C.S.I."). See score at DIT Conservatory of Music and Drama, Dublin.
- Muirgheis (Thadgh O'Donoghue, English version by Nora Chesson and George Moore), "(The First Irish Opera) in three acts" (1903). First performance: Dublin, Theatre Royal, 7 December 1903 (New York: Breitkopf & Härtel, 1910; plate no. L. 206.). Dedicated "To Clann na hÉireann".
- Seven Original Irish Melodies (texts by James Clarence Mangan, Denny Lane, Dan Lynch, P.J. McCall, Ethna Carbery, J.J. Callanan, Edward Walsh; with Irish translations by Dan Lynch) for voice and piano (Dublin: Pigott, Gaelic League Offices, 1903).
- Fódhla. Irish Sonata for violin & piano (London: Charles Woolhouse, 1904).

== Bibliography ==
- Obituary: The Musical Times 56 (1915) 868 (1 June), p. 352.
- Joseph J. Ryan: Nationalism and Music in Ireland (PhD thesis, National University of Ireland, Maynooth, 1991; unpublished).
- Axel Klein: Die Musik Irlands im 20. Jahrhundert (Hildesheim: Georg Olms, 1996).
- Axel Klein: "Stage-Irish, or The National in Irish Opera 1780–1925", in: Opera Quarterly 21 (2005) 1, p. 27–67.
- Axel Klein: "Butler, Thomas O'Brien", in: The Encyclopaedia of Music in Ireland, ed. Harry White & Barra Boydell (Dublin: UCD Press, 2013), p. 142–143.
- David Scott: "Examining the Irish Art Song: Original Song Settings of Irish Texts by Irish Composers, 1900-1930" (MPhil, DIT, 2018).
