= Robert O'Dwyer =

Irish composer

Robert O'Dwyer (in Irish: Riobárd Ó Duibhir) (27 January 1862 – 6 January 1949) was an Irish composer mainly known for having written one of the first operas in the Irish language.

== Biography ==
Robert O'Dwyer was born to Irish parents in Bristol, England, where he received private musical education and acted as a chorister and assistant organist during the years 1872 to 1891. O'Dwyer's interest in opera manifested itself initially by becoming the conductor of a local amateur opera company in 1889, before he became a conductor of the Carl Rosa Opera Society (1891–97) and the Arthur Rousby Opera Company (1892–96), with which he undertook tours throughout the British Isles. After one such tour he settled in Dublin in 1897, where he held various positions as organist in the counties of Dublin and Wicklow. From 1899 he taught music at the Royal University of Ireland and from 1901 conducted the choir of the Gaelic League, for which he wrote numerous arrangements of Irish traditional music and Sean nos songs. He also wrote articles and concert reviews for The Leader, which became an outlet for his increasingly nationalist views. O'Dwyer completed his major composition, the three-act opera Eithne, in 1909, on the strengths of which he was appointed Professor of Irish Music at University College Dublin (1914–1939). Although he wrote (and published) a number of other works, including a second opera, none of his later works came near the success and significance of Eithne. O'Dwyer died in Dublin.

== Music ==
O'Dwyer is chiefly notable for having written the opera Eithne (1909), one of the first full-scale operas written entirely in the Irish language. Although Muirgheis (1903) by Thomas O'Brien Butler (1861–1915) was earlier, that work had initially been performed in an English translation, whereas Eithne was performed in Irish. After a small-scale performance in 1909, the first full performance took place at the Gaiety Theatre, Dublin, on 16 May 1910. A concert performance of the work took place at the National Concert Hall, Dublin, in October 2017 featuring the RTÉ National Symphony Orchestra and singers Orla Boylan, Gavan Ring, Robin Tritschler and Eamonn Mulhall. The background to both Muirgheis and Eithne – and other works including Connla of the Golden Hair (1903) by William Harvey Pélissier, The Tinker and the Fairy (1909) by Michele Esposito, and to some extent Diarmuid and Gráinne (1901) by Edward Elgar – is the increasing recourse to Irish mythology and the Celtic revival within Irish culture as a means for national identification in the (cultural) struggle for independence. Eithne is one of the best pieces of its kind and would certainly deserve a modern revival.

The composer's background in liturgical music led to a number of works in this area, too, including Benediction Music (c.1924) and some works in the Irish-language collection of religious songs, Dánta Dé (1928), of which O'Dwyer was one of the editors. His second opera was a one-act piece called Cleopatra (1929) and was not as successful. He also wrote a number of choral works, mostly arrangements of folksongs.

== Selected works ==
Operas

- Eithne (Thomas O'Kelly), romantic Irish opera, 3 acts (1909; Dublin: Gaiety Theatre, 16 May 1910) (Dublin: Cramer, Wood & Co., 1910)
- Cleopatra (librettist unknown), opera, 1 act (1929)

Instrumental

- Overture in D major (1900) for orchestra
- Three Old Irish Melodies for violin & piano (Dublin: Cramer, Wood & Co., 1917)
- Rêverie à l'orgue (n.d.) for organ

Choral

- Duan na Saoirse (trad.) (1902) for satb
- Péarla an Bhrollaigh Bháin (trad.) (1902) for satb
- Seaghán Ó Duibhir an Ghleanna (trad.) (1902) for satb
- Siubhail a Gradh (trad.) (1904) for 3 equal female voices
- Slán le Máigh (trad.) (1904) for satb
- Irish Lullaby (T. MacDonnell) (1913) for ssa & piano (London: Vincent Music Co.)
- Benediction Music in A flat (bibl.) (c.1924) for satb and organ (further ones in E flat and C)
- Deus tu conversus (bibl.) (c.1924) for satb and organ
- three religious pieces for satb (nos. 49, 83, 84), in: Dánta Dé, ed. Úna Ní Ógáin & Riobard Ó Duibhir (Dublin: Oifig an tSoláthair, 1928)

Songs

- An Arab Love Song (F. Wood) (Dublin: Cramer, Wood & Co., 1905; also London: Bach & Co., 1913)
- Thoughts (D. O'Carroll) (London: Bach & Co., 1912)
- Sé ubhla as Ubhla de'n chraoibh (Robert O'Dwyer) (1926)

== Bibliography ==
- Annie W. Patterson: "Feis Prize Winners for 1900: Mr Robert Dwyer", in: Weekly Irish Times, 16 June 1900.
- Joseph J. Ryan: Nationalism and Music in Ireland (PhD thesis, National University of Ireland, Maynooth, 1991; unpublished).
- Axel Klein: Die Musik Irlands im 20. Jahrhundert (Hildesheim: Georg Olms, 1996).
- Axel Klein: "Stage-Irish, or The National in Irish Opera 1780–1925", in: Opera Quarterly 21 (2005) 1, p. 27−67.
- Axel Klein: "O'Dwyer, Robert", in: The Encyclopaedia of Music in Ireland, ed. Harry White & Barra Boydell (Dublin: UCD Press, 2013), p. 760.
