= 1870 Birthday Honours =

British government recognitions

The 1870 Birthday Honours were appointments by Queen Victoria to various orders and honours to reward and highlight good works by citizens of the British Empire. The appointments were made to celebrate the official birthday of the Queen, and were published in The London Gazette on 31 May 1870.

The recipients of honours are displayed here as they were styled before their new honour, and arranged by honour, with classes (Knight, Knight Grand Cross, etc.) and then divisions (Military, Civil, etc.) as appropriate.

== United Kingdom and British Empire ==
=== The Most Exalted Order of the Star of India ===
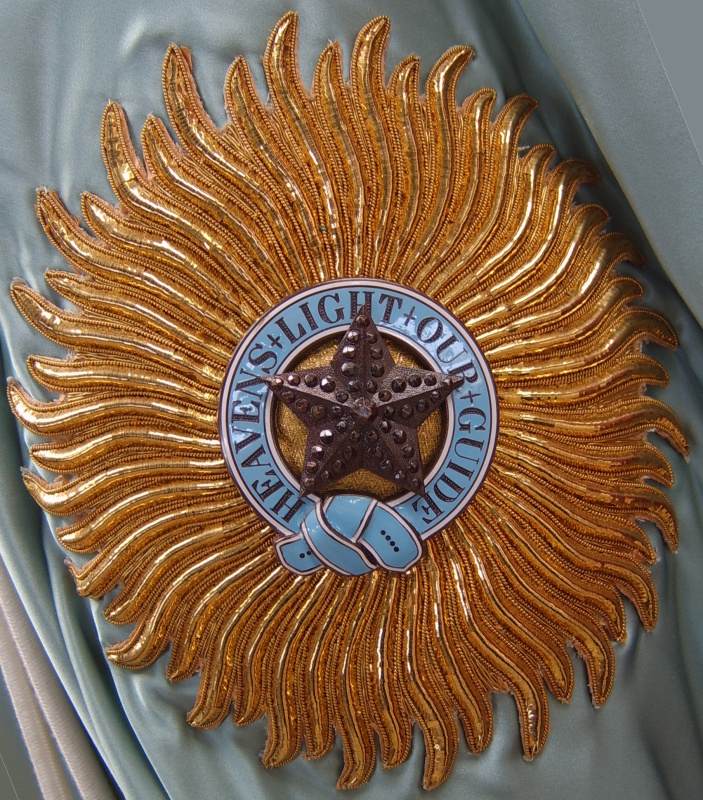
Star of a Knight Grand Commander of the Most Exalted Order of the Star of India

==== Knight Grand Commander (GCSI) ====
- His Highness Mahendra Singh, Maharaja of Patiala
- The Nawab Salar Jung Bahadoor KCSI Minister of the Hyderabad State

==== Knight Commander (KCSI) ====
- His Highness Prince Gholam Mahomed
- William Grey, Bengal Civil Service, Lieutenant-Governor of Bengal

==== Companion (CSI) ====
- Alexander John Arbuthnot, Madras Civil Service, Member of the Council of the Governor of Madras
- Edward Clive Bayley, Bengal Civil Service, Secretary to Government of India, Home Department
- The Rajah Jai Kishan Das, Deputy Magistrate at Allyghur
- Colonel Michael Dawes, late Bengal Artillery
- Colonel Henry Errington Longden CB late Adjutant-General of the Bengal Army
- Colonel Henry Edward Landor Thuillier, Royal (late Bengal) Artillery, Surveyor-General in India
- Colonel John Cumming Anderson, Royal (late Madras) Engineers, formerly Chief Engineer at Lucknow
- Colonel Martin Dillon CB Rifle Brigade, Military Secretary to the Commander-in-Chief in India
- Baboo Shiva Persad, of Benares, Educational Department
