= Mahendra Singh of Patiala =

Maharaja of Patiala from 1862–1876

Mahendra Singh
- Maharaja of Patiala (more)
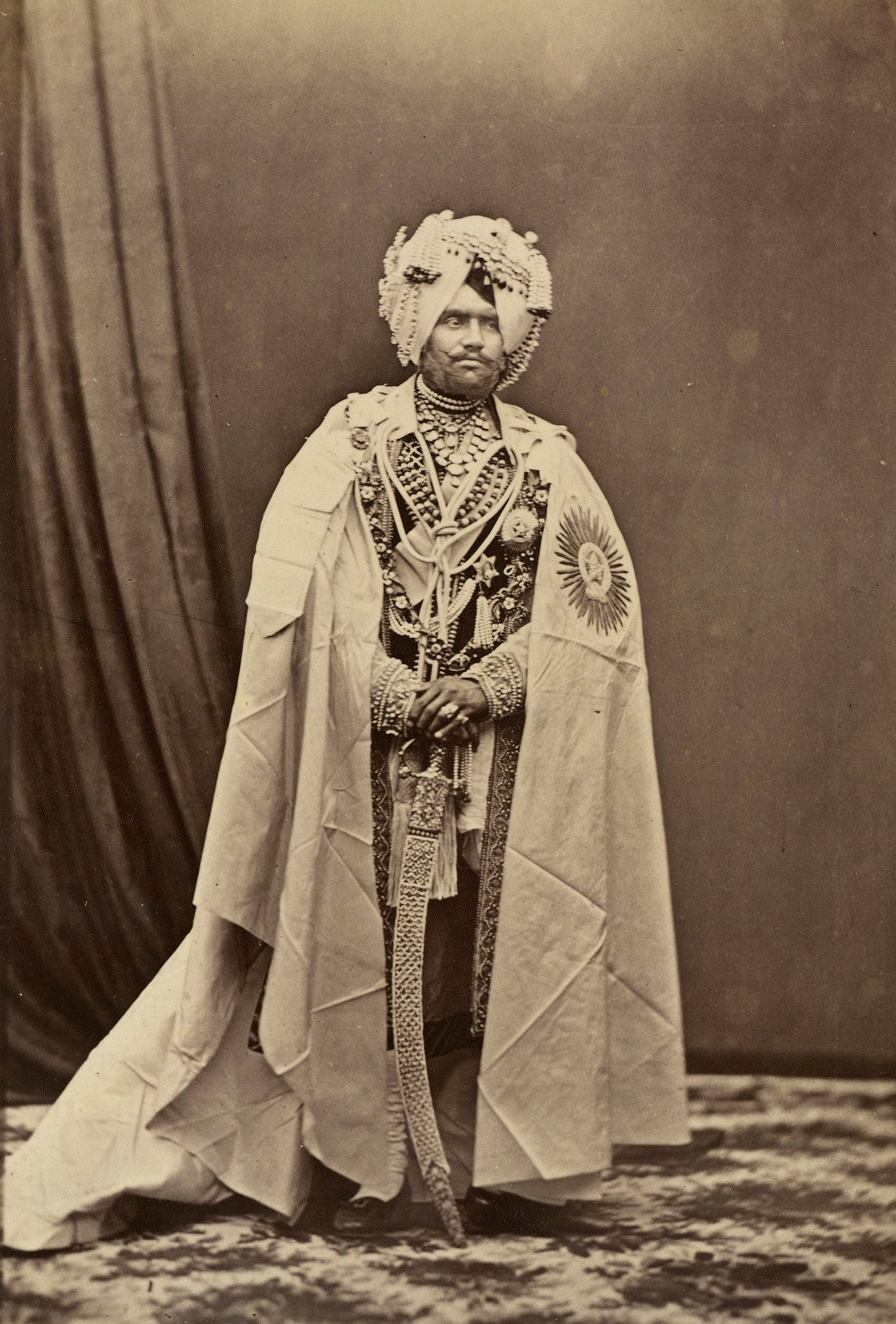
- Portrait, c. 1875–1876

Maharaja of Patiala
- Reign: 1862–1876
- Predecessor: Narinder Singh
- Successor: Rajinder Singh
- Born: 16 September 1852
- Died: 13 April 1876 (aged 23); Moti Bagh Palace, Patiala
- Issue: Rajinder Singh; Ranbir Singh
- Dynasty: Phulkian
- Father: Narinder Singh
- Mother: Maharani Kakarawala
- Religion: Sikhism

Mahendra Singh GCSI (1852–1876), also spelt as Mohinder Singh, was the Maharaja of Patiala from 1862 to 1876.

== Early life ==
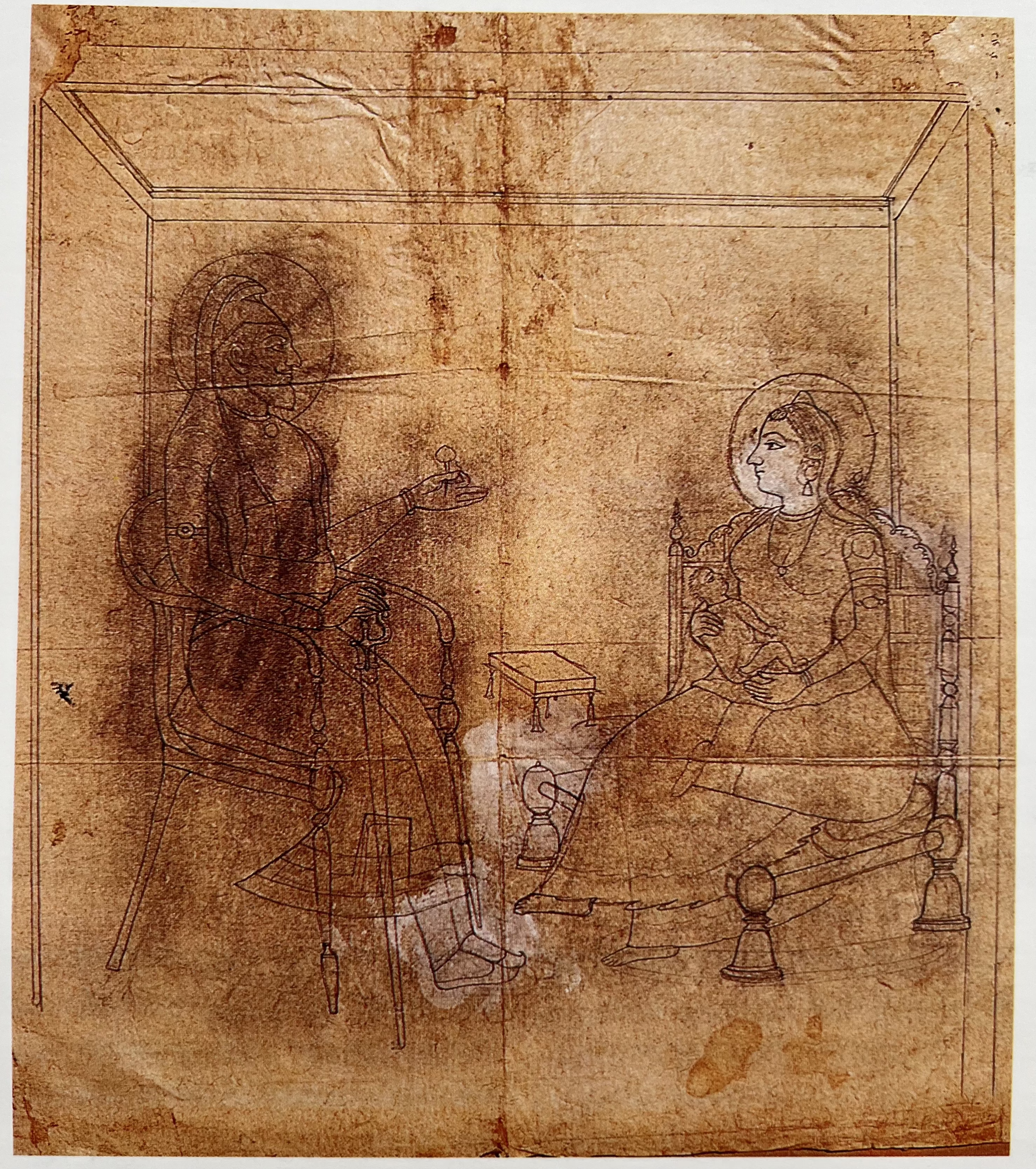
Drawing of Maharaja Narinder Singh of Patiala with his wife Maharani Kakarawala and newborn son Mohinder Singh, circa mid-19th century

Mahendra Singh was the son of Narinder Singh, the Maharaja of Patiala. He was a member of the Phulkian Dynasty and succeeded to the throne in 1862. Singh was still a minor when he became Maharaja and a council of regency ran the Patiala State government until he came of age in 1870.

== Reign ==
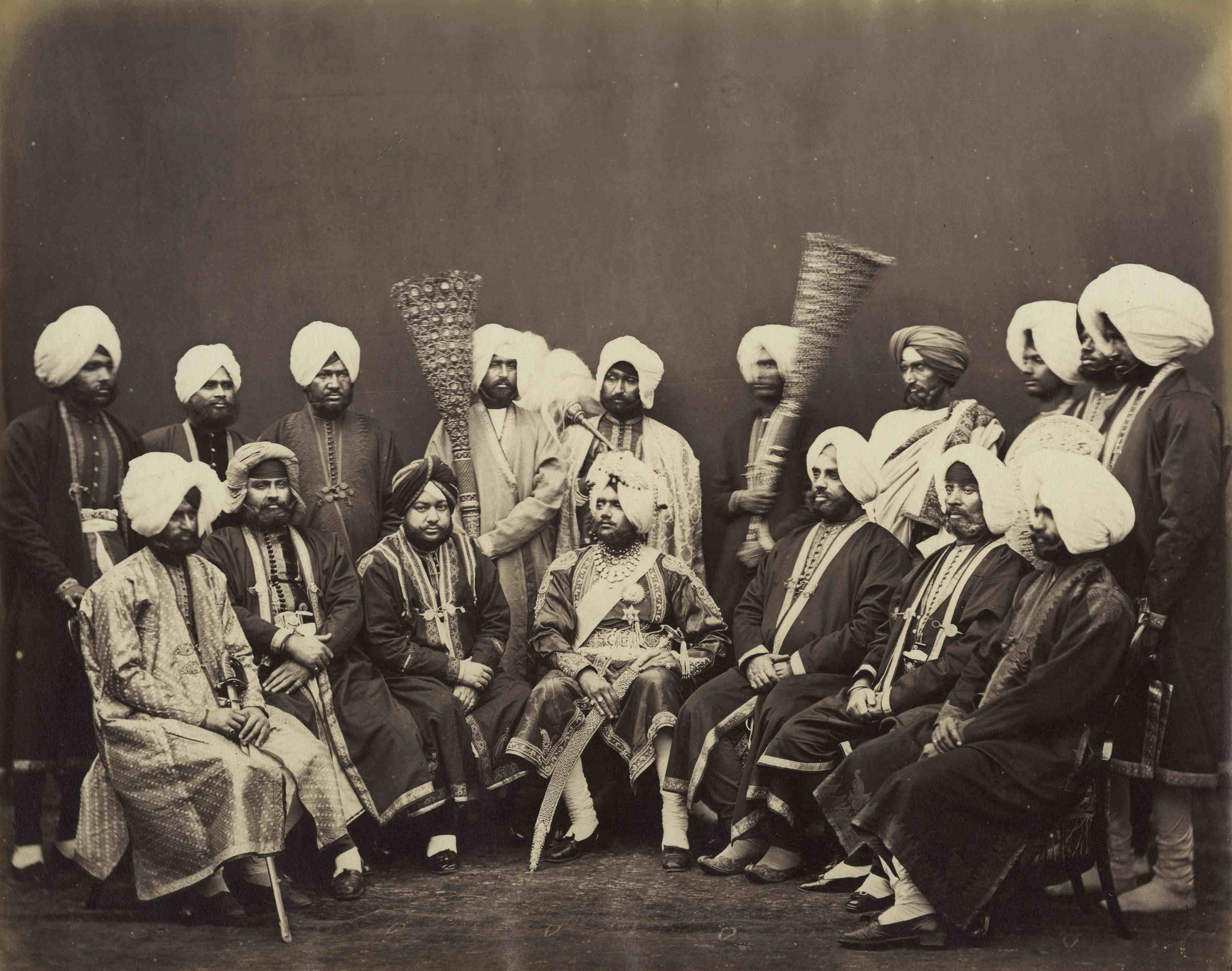
Photograph of Mahendra Singh and suite, by Bourne & Shepherd, c. 1870s

The project of the Sirhind Canal was sanctioned during his reign in 1867, and Singh contributed one crore and twenty lakhs towards the construction costs of the canal. In the 1870 Birthday Honours, Singh was appointed a Knight Grand Commander of the Order of the Star of India (GCSI).

Singh donated 70,000 rupees to University College, Lahore. In 1873, during the Bihar famine of 1873–1874, he donated 10 lakh rupees to the British Raj government to help famine-stricken people in Bengal. In 1875, Mohindra College was founded in Patiala and endowed with a palatial building. Mohindra College was established to promote higher education, and the college charged no fees. Singh also supported Syed Ahmad Khan in establishing and developing Aligarh Muslim University.

The telegraph line between Patiala and Ambala was also constructed during this reign. During his reign, numerous artists and painters from Rajasthan and Himachal Pradesh would work at his court in Patiala.

== Death and successor ==
Dying in 1876, Singh was succeeded as Maharaja by his four year old son Rajinder Singh, who was born in 1872. His second son was Ranbir Singh, who was a Knight Commander of the Order of the Star of India (KCSI) and served on the Imperial Legislative Council. In 1903, Ranbir Singh donated his estates and residences in Kasauli, now in Himachal Pradesh, for the Indian Pasteur Institute, which later became the Central Research Institute, Kasauli.

== Title ==
His Highness Farzand-i-Khas-i-Daulat-i-Inglishia, Mansur-i-Zaman, Amir ul-Umara, Maharajadhiraja Raj Rajeshwar, Sri Maharaja-i-Rajgan, Maharaja Sir Mahendra Singh, Mahendra Bahadur, Yadu Vansha Vatans Bhatti Kul Bushan, Maharaja of Patiala, GCSI.
