= Narinder Singh of Patiala =

Maharaja of Patiala from 1845 to 1862

Narinder Singh
- Maharaja of Patiala
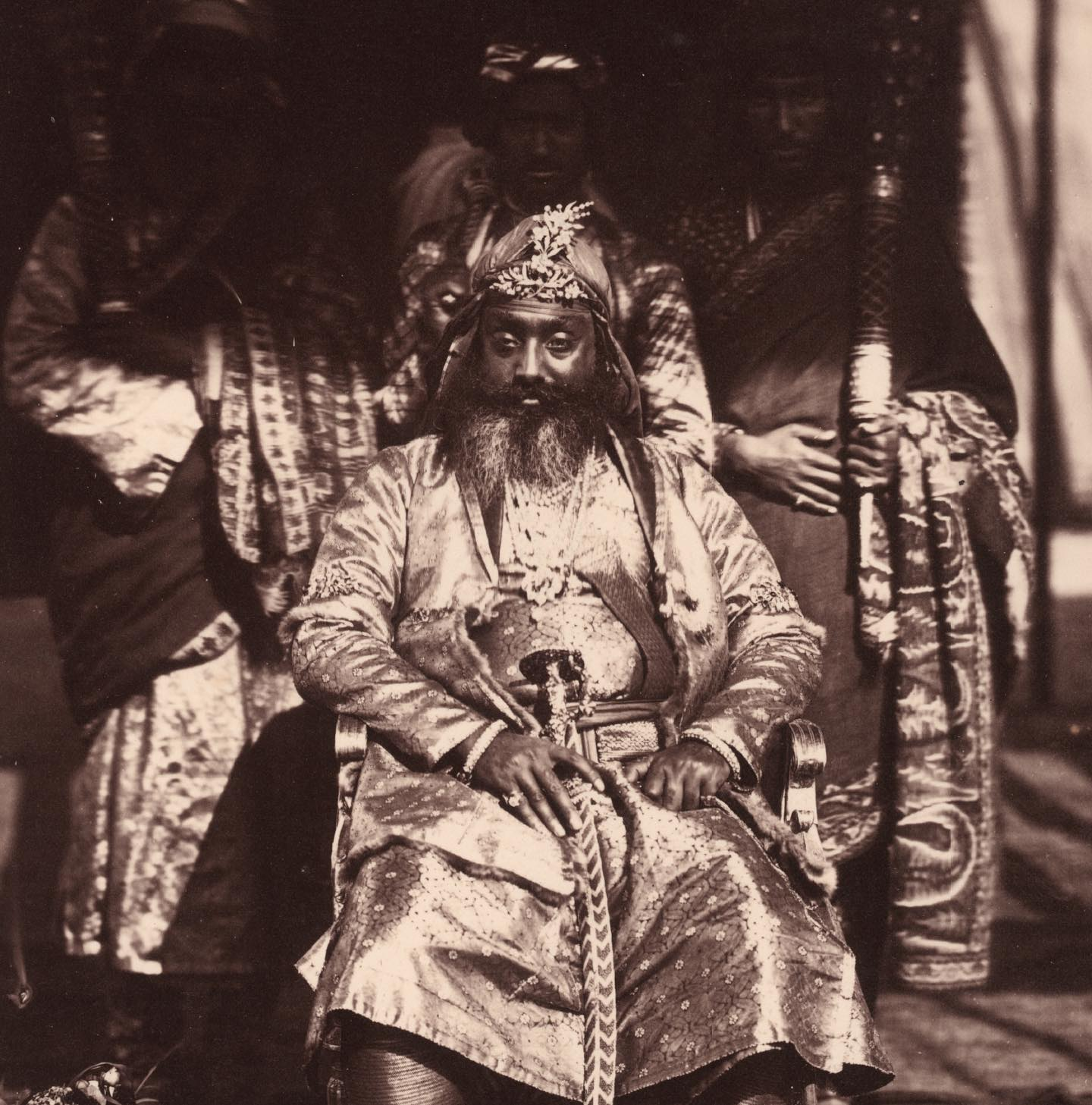
- Narinder Singh with attendants, c. 1860

Maharaja of Patiala
- Reign: 1845 – 1862
- Predecessor: Karam Singh
- Successor: Mahendra Singh
- Born: 26 November 1824
- Died: 13 November 1862 (aged 37)
- Issue: Mahendra Singh; Basant Kaur; Bishan Kaur
- Dynasty: Phulkian
- Religion: Sikhism

Narinder Singh KSI (26 November 1824 – 13 November 1862), also spelt as Narendra Singh, was the Maharaja of the princely state of Patiala from 1845 to 1862. He was one of the first local rulers to receive the Order of the Star of India and was a member of the Indian Legislative Council during Lord Canning's Viceroyalty. He is popularly regarded as one of the wisest rulers of Patiala, with him having a wide diversity of interests.

== Biography ==
Singh was born in 1824, his father was Maharaja Karam Singh of Patiala. At an early age, his father arranged for him to be educated in the Urdu and Persian languages, making Singh the first Patiala heir to have his education arranged personally by his father, with the two sharing a close bond. In his youth as a Crown Prince, also referred to by the tile of Tikka, he was betrothed to a princess from Alwar, who may have influenced his later artistic intrigues. He succeeded his father on 18 January 1846, aged twenty-three. He would keep a painting of his father near him to keep an example in mind and preserve Karam's memory. During Singh's reign, the Moti Bagh Palace was constructed in 1847 at a cost of five lakhs of rupees. Despite the construction of Moti Bagh, he continued to reside regularly at Qila Mubarak.

In 1848, he assisted the British during the Second Anglo-Sikh War. After the war he was awarded with further revenue and territory. After the war, he completed the building of the Sheesh Mahal in the late 1840s with Moti Bagh gardens near it. He also would construct a number of Hindu and Sikh temples in Patiala around this period.

During the Indian Rebellion of 1857, Singh assisted the East India Company, and his assistance were later acknowledged by the Governor-General of India, Lord Canning as being of incalculable value. In 1859, he added the Darbar Hall to the Qila Mubarak complex.

He died of fever on 13 November 1862 at the age of thirty-nine. He was succeeded as Maharaja by his ten-year-old son, Mahendra Singh. His daughter, Basant Kaur, married Bhagwant Singh, the Maharaj-Rana of Dholpur. His other daughter, Bishan Kaur, married Jaswant Singh, the Maharaja of Bharatpur.

== Patron of the arts and science ==
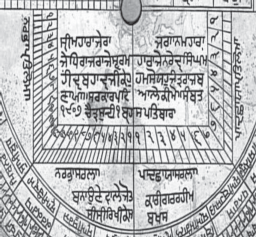
Gurmukhi inscription on the back of the astrolabe produced in Patiala State during the reign of Maharaja Narinder Singh, c. 1850

Narinder Singh was a patron of the arts, hiring artists, architects, musicians, poets, and historians. Many artists left Lahore and Delhi after 1849 (also after Ranjit Singh's death in 1839) and 1857, finding new employment at Patiala under Narinder Singh's patronage, who had been awarded with revenue and territory from the British due to his pro-British activities during wars. He likely maintained an atelier of traditional artists (producing miniatures) and architects but he was also interested in European art. In 1853, Maharaja Narinder Singh of Patiala obtained a daguerreotype and tried to have one of his artists trained in its use. He constructed the Sheesh Mahal, which is decorated with wall paintings. The Qila Mubarak was also redecorated during his reign with mural work. His commissioned four portraits of his predecessors in the royal dails of the Shish Mahal in the Ranivas of the Qila Mubarak. A Gurmukhi astrolabe was produced during his reign. After his death, his style of art-patronage was continued by his successors and imitated by other Sikh states, such as Kapurthala, Nabha, Jind, and Faridkot. Narinder Singh was able to successfully obtain manuscripts of the Guru Granth Sahib that had been looted by the Pahari Rajas during their invasion of Anandpur in 1704. Attempting to align Patiala with the Anandpur raj that had been founded by Guru Gobind Singh in the 1690s, especially the guru's Kavi Darbar tradition, Narinder Singh patronized the re-creation of Guru Gobind Singh's Mahabharata, which had consisted of eighteen main books like the original.
