= Nora Chesson =

English journalist and poet (1871–1906)

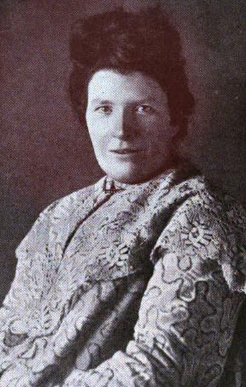
Nora Hopper Chesson, from a 1906 publication

Nora Hopper - Under Quicken Boughs

Nora Chesson (2 January 1871 – 14 April 1906) was an English journalist and poet. She won for herself a distinct celebrity as a contributor to most of the English periodicals and newspapers of her time.

== Biography ==
Eleanor Jane Hopper was born in Exeter, on 2 January 1871. Her father, Capt. Harman Baillie Hopper, was Irish. She was a participant in the Irish literary movement of the 1890s, having some influence on W. B. Yeats in particular with her Ballads in Prose (1894).

Her career as an author of poetry and prose began in 1887 when she was not quite seventeen years of age. She went on to increase her literary reputation until her death. In some of her poems, there was an atmosphere of melancholy which might seem as if it cast upon them the shadow of a too-early death. She provided the English translation to Thadgh O'Donoghue's libretto for the Irish opera Muirgheis (1903) by Thomas O'Brien Butler (1861–1915).

In 1901, she married the English man of letters Wilfrid Hugh Chesson (1870–1953). She died from heart failure at her home in North Sheen on 14 April 1906. They had three children: Ann Caroline Spry (b. 1902), Dermot (b. 1904), and Dagmar (b. 1906). Five volumes of her selected poems were published that year by Alston Rivers, of London, which included a short biographical note by the editor, her husband, and an introductory appreciation by Ford Madox Hueffer.
