= Moti Bagh Palace =

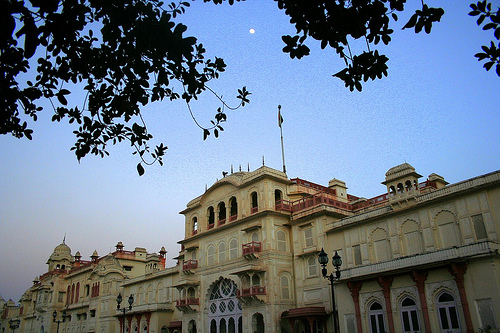
- The Old Moti Bagh Palace
- Type: royal palace
- Location: Patiala, Punjab, India

History
- Built: 1847
- Original use: Residence of the Maharaja of Patiala

Site notes
- Architectural style: Sikh architecture
- Current use: Headquarters of the North Zone Cultural Centre; Office of the National Institute of Sports; museum.

Moti Bagh Mahal (Pearl Garden Palace) is a palace in Patiala. The palace was built by Maharaja Narinder Singh, the great-grandfather of Maharaja Bhupinder Singh, in 1847, at a cost of half a million rupees. The Old Palace is one of the largest residencies in Asia, housing the Netaji Subhas National Institute of Sports (NIS) currently. The New Moti Bagh Palace is the residence of Former Chief Minister of Punjab Captain Amarinder Singh currently.

== History ==
The Old Moti Bagh Palace and New Moti Bagh Palace were built respectively by Maharaja Narinder Singh (reigned 1845–62) and Maharaja Yadavindra Singh (reigned 1938-47). The original complex was constructed in 1847 under Maharaja Narinder Singh, being based upon the Mughal palace of Shalimar Gardens in Lahore.

Film footage of palaces of Patiala, Punjab, by Roger Dumas, circa November–December 1927

It was expanded in 1920s under the supervision of Sir Ganga Ram during the reign of Maharaja Bhupinder Singh. After independence, the Government of India took over the premises, and later converted it into a museum, a taxidermy gallery, and the North Zone Cultural Centre.

The National Institute of Sports (NIS) Patiala is situated in its East wing, where the annual Patiala Heritage festival is celebrated.

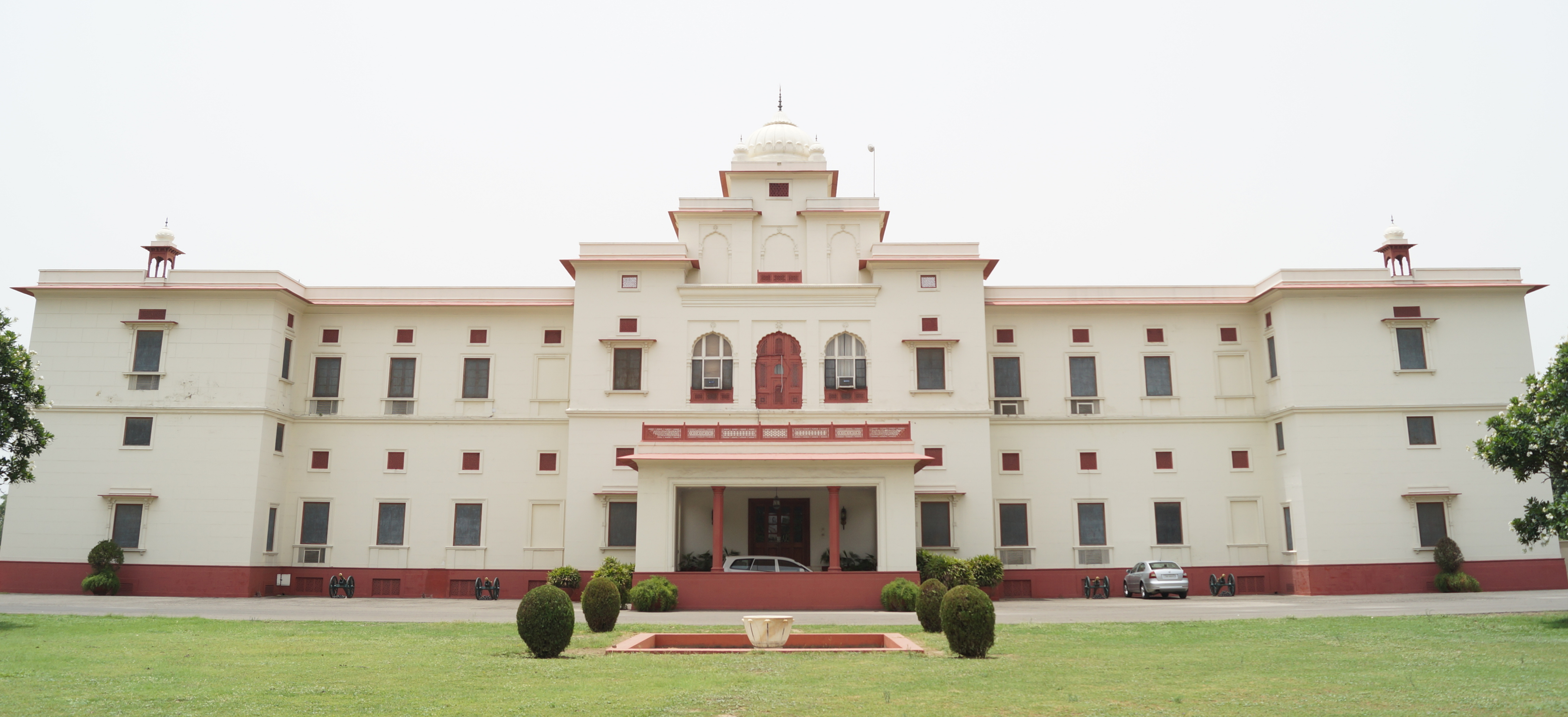
The New Moti Bagh Palace

There is another building, called the New Moti Bagh Palace, built in 1959, that is residence of Amarinder Singh. The current familial heirs of Patiala reside in New Moti Bagh Palace.

== Architecture ==
The Palace incorporates Indian and European architectural features.

== Gallery ==
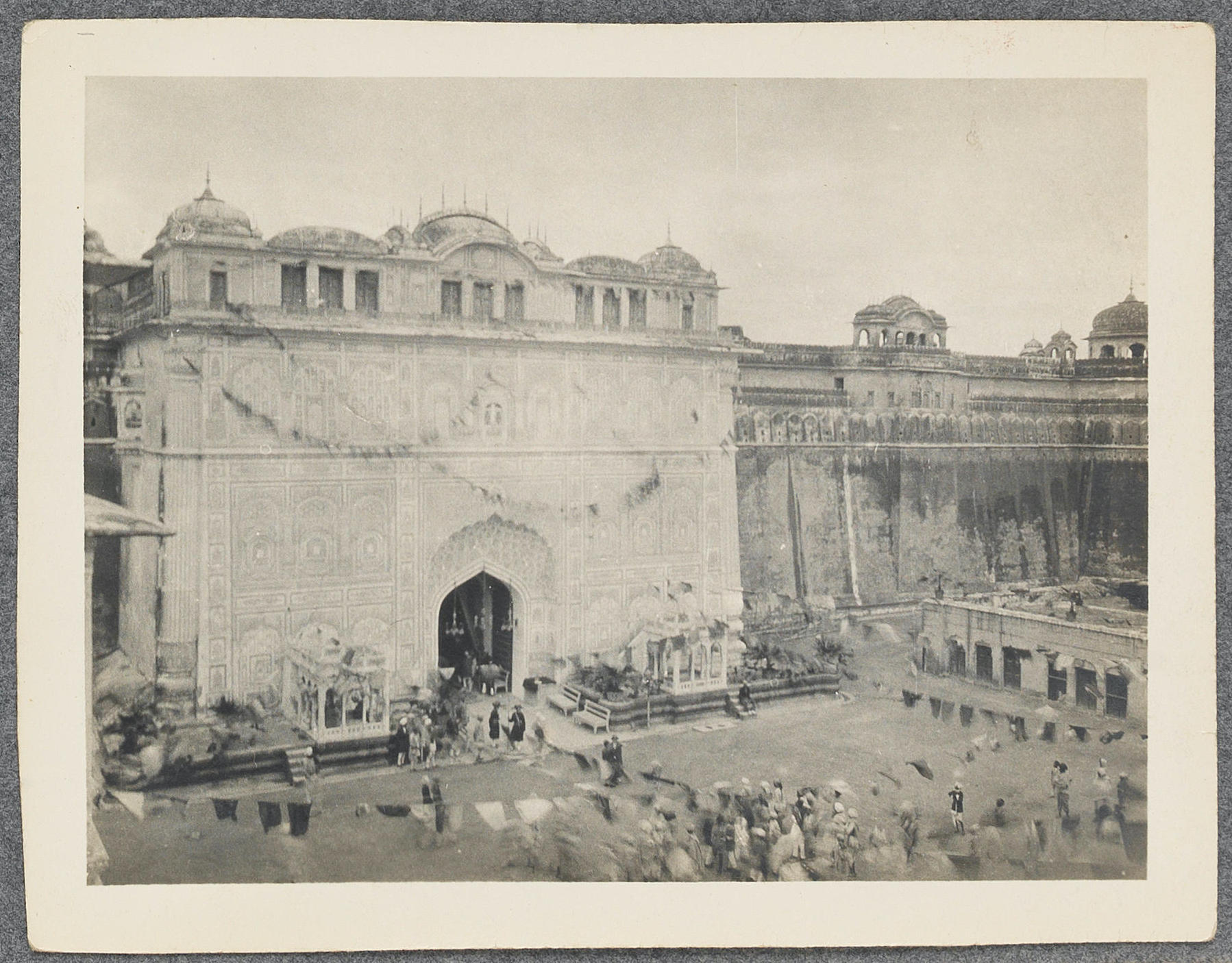
Detail of the entrance of Moti Bagh Palace from an album of photographs compiled by the wife of H.R. Hunter during his time as Dental Surgeon at Moti Bagh Palace during the reign of Maharajah Bhupinder Singh, c. 1922–23

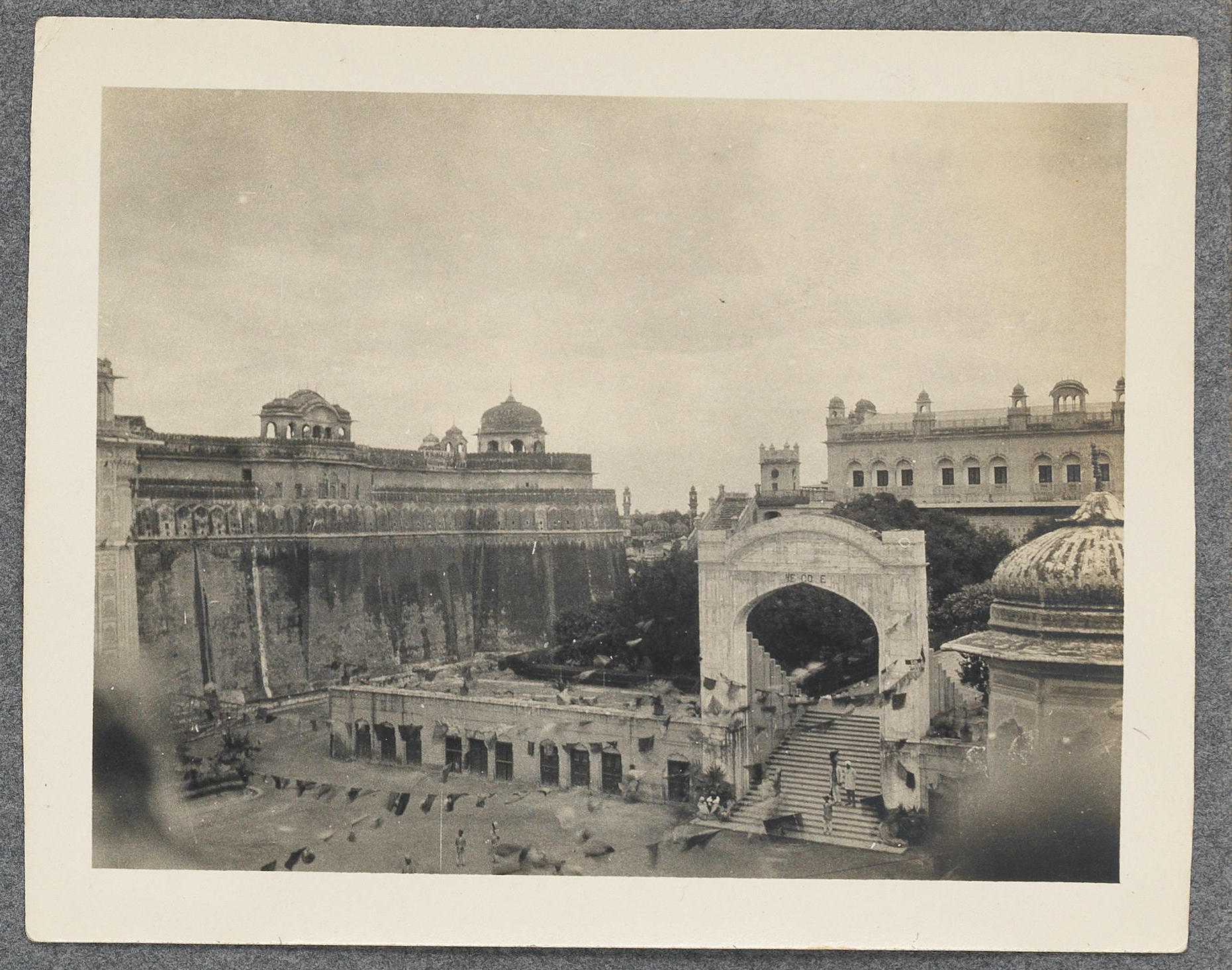
Detail of the entrance of Moti Bagh Palace from an album of photographs compiled by the wife of H.R. Hunter during his time as Dental Surgeon at Moti Bagh Palace during the reign of Maharajah Bhupinder Singh, c. 1922–23

== See also ==
- Qila Mubarak, Patiala
- Bahadurgarh Fort
