= Karam Singh of Patiala =

Maharaja of Patiala (r.1813 – 1845)

Karam Singh
- Maharaja of Patiala
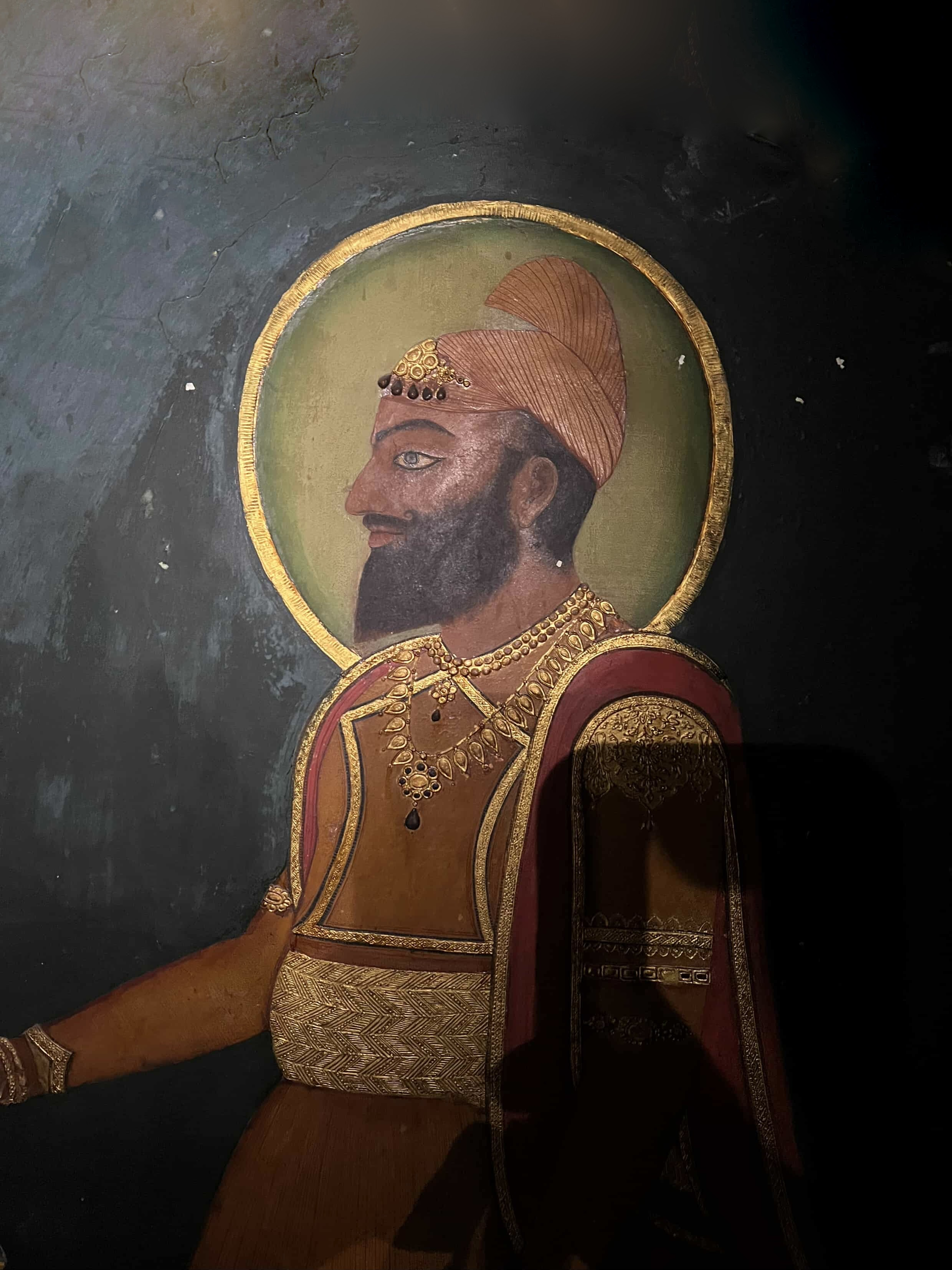
- Painting of Maharaja Karam Singh in the Audience Hall of Qila Mubarak, Patiala, circa mid-19th century

Maharaja of Patiala
- Reign: 1813 – 1845
- Predecessor: Sahib Singh
- Successor: Narinder Singh
- Born: 1798
- Died: 1845 (aged 46–47)
- Issue: Narinder Singh
- Dynasty: Phulkian dynasty
- Father: Sahib Singh
- Mother: Rattan Kaur

Karam Singh (1798 – 1845) was the fourth ruler of Patiala State and the Maharaja of Patiala. Singh was the first of the Patiala rulers to have the title of Maharaja. His reign was noted for Patiala State's territorial expansion and his support for the British Empire. During his reign, the kingdom of Patiala was the second-largest Sikh state, located in present-day southern Punjab and northern Haryana. The cause of his death is disputed, with varying theories regarding it.

== Early life and background ==
As per lore, Baba Ram Das of the Divana sub-sect of Sikhism blessed Raja Sahib Singh with a son, thus when the son was born he was named karam meaning "luck" or "fortune". Karam Singh was born in 1797 or 1798. He was the son Sahib Singh, the ruler and Raja-e-Rajgan of Patiala, his mother was Rattan Kaur (other sources state it was As Kaur). Singh was also the member of the Phulkian dynasty.

== Reign ==
Singh became the ruler of Patiala in 1813. He was also the first ruler of Patiala to have been referred to as a Maharaja, the title having been bestowed on him by Mughal Emperor Akbar II. Singh was also noted as a patron of paintings, and from 1814 to 1815, he had a family of Rajasthani painters at his court.

=== Administration and rule ===
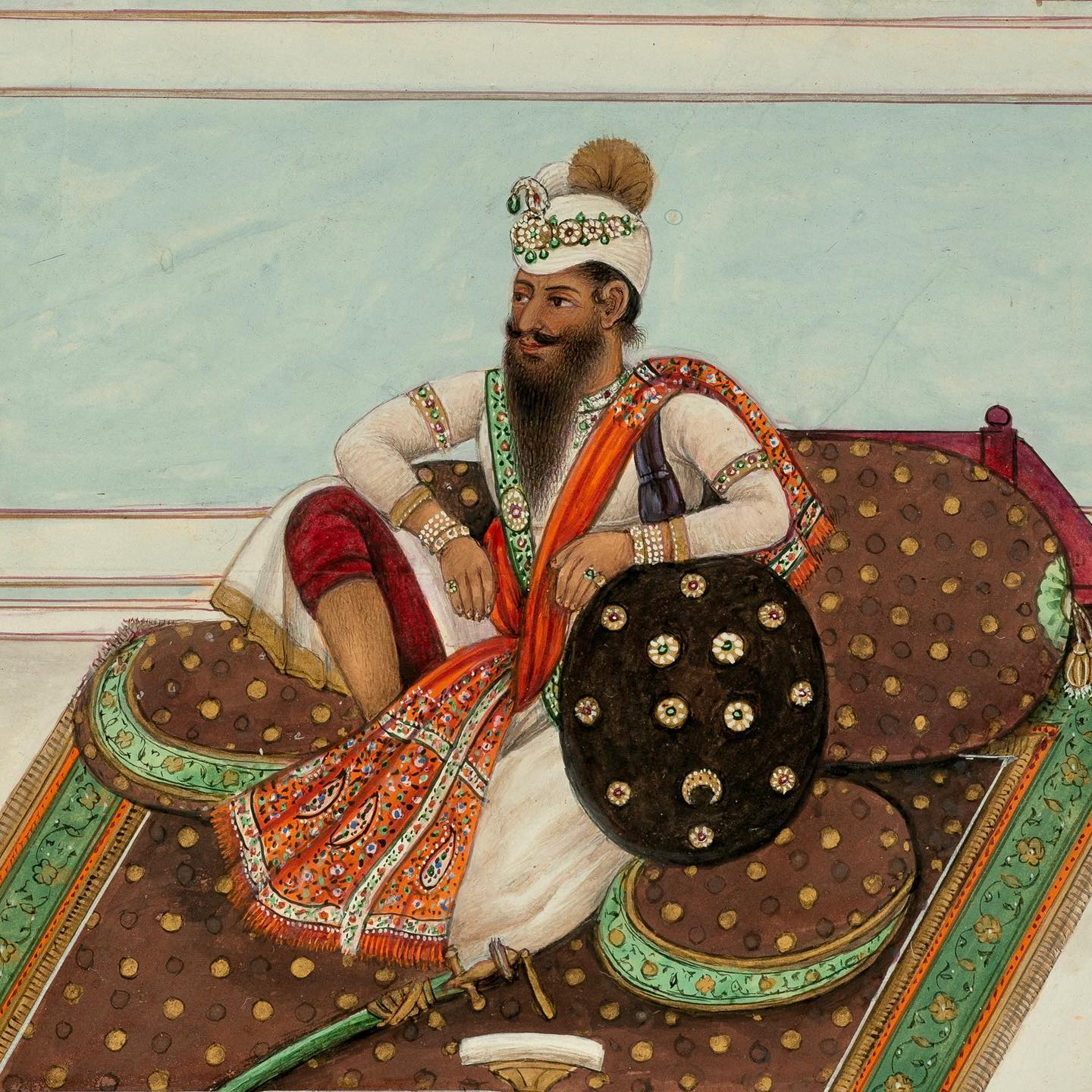
Detail of a painting of Karam Singh, ca. 1836

During his early reign, Singh had disputes with his mother and his younger brother, Ajit Singh. Singh continued his dispute with Nabha State, another Phulkian dynasty state, which had been carrying on since 1807. He helped the British repel the Gurkha advance early in his reign, with him being bestowed the territories of Shimla and Chail due to this assistance. From 1838 to 1843, Singh had a border dispute with Kaithal State. He had extensive diplomatic relations with Maharaja Ranjit Singh of the Sikh Empire, whose court in Lahore a vakil of Patiala was often dispatched to. By 1823, a number of reforms were enacted by Karam Singh to improve the rule of the kingdom, such as ending petty disputes with other chiefs, increasing centralization such as via land revenue policy, and improving the power and independence of the treasury by reducing the influence of moneylenders. Another reform was that after 1829, the Diwans of Patiala began recording state revenue records in Persian rather than Landa script, as had been the case.

=== Relations with the British Empire and territorial expansion ===
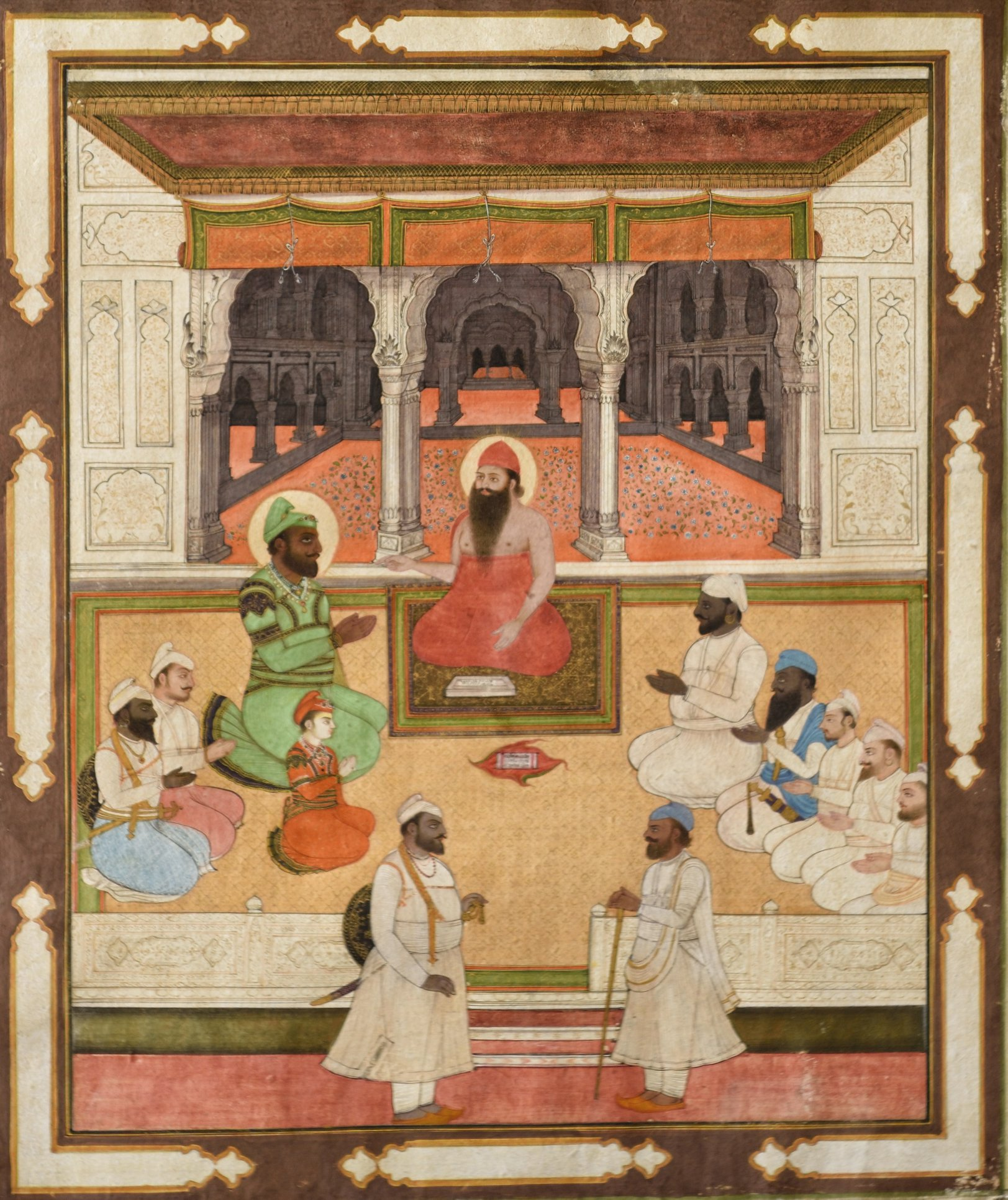
Singh and his son, Narinder Singh, with a holy man

Singh supported the British Empire during the Anglo-Nepalese War from 1814 to 1816. In return for Singh's support during the Anglo-Nepalese War, the British awarded Singh territory in the hill states, extending Patiala State's territory to Shimla, Chail and other areas in modern-day Himachal Pradesh. In 1845, Singh declared his support for the British against the Sikh Empire.

== Art, literary, and architectural projects ==
Karam Singh hired a number of Pahari, Rajasthani, and Awadhi artists, leading to the development of a unique Patiala school of art. During the reign of Karam Singh, the Qila Mubarak was expanded and renovated as Karam Singh hired Jaipuri artists, architects, and carpenters. He is also attributed for the construction of a Kali temple in Patiala, renovations at Bahadurgarh Fort, and the reconstructions of various gurdwaras and Sikh shrines at various Sikh pilgrimage spots. He is also noted for his architectural patronage, with a unique Phulkian style of Sikh architecture developing under him. Some gurdwaras built during his reign include Gurdwara Qila Mubarak, Bathinda, Gurdwara Fatehgarh Sahib and Gurdwara Tilak Asthan (Garhi Sahib) in Chamkaur, and Gurdwara Sri Patshahi Nauvin Sahib Qila Bahadurgarh. Under Karam Singh's patronage, a number of artists and poets enjoyed patronage. During his reign, the poet Vir Singh Bal wrote the Singh Sagar Granth documenting the life of Guru Gobind Singh and wrote his own unique rendition of the Heer-Ranjha folk-tale titled Heer of Jhang Sial and Ranjha of Takhta Hazara. Ram Singh was given the task of translating the Persian political treatise, the Ikhlaq-e-Mohsin, with the translated work being known as Suniti Prakash. Furthermore, the Sikh poet Santokh Singh enjoyed the patronage of Patiala from 1823 to 1829.

== Death and succession ==
Singh died in 1845 and was succeeded by his son, Narinder Singh, as the Maharaja of Patiala. The death of Maharaja Karam Singh is mysterious, with there existing different theories. According to one claim suggested by The Illustrated London News (April 1846 issue), Karam Singh was executed by the British via hanging for supporting the Sikh Empire during the First Anglo-Sikh War in 1845–46. Another theory is that he was poisoned by his durbaris (courtiers) for refusing to support the Sikh Empire during the war. A third belief is that he died from illness.
