= Qila Mubarak, Patiala =

Royal palace in Patiala, India

Qila Mubarak
- Fort of Baba Ala Singh
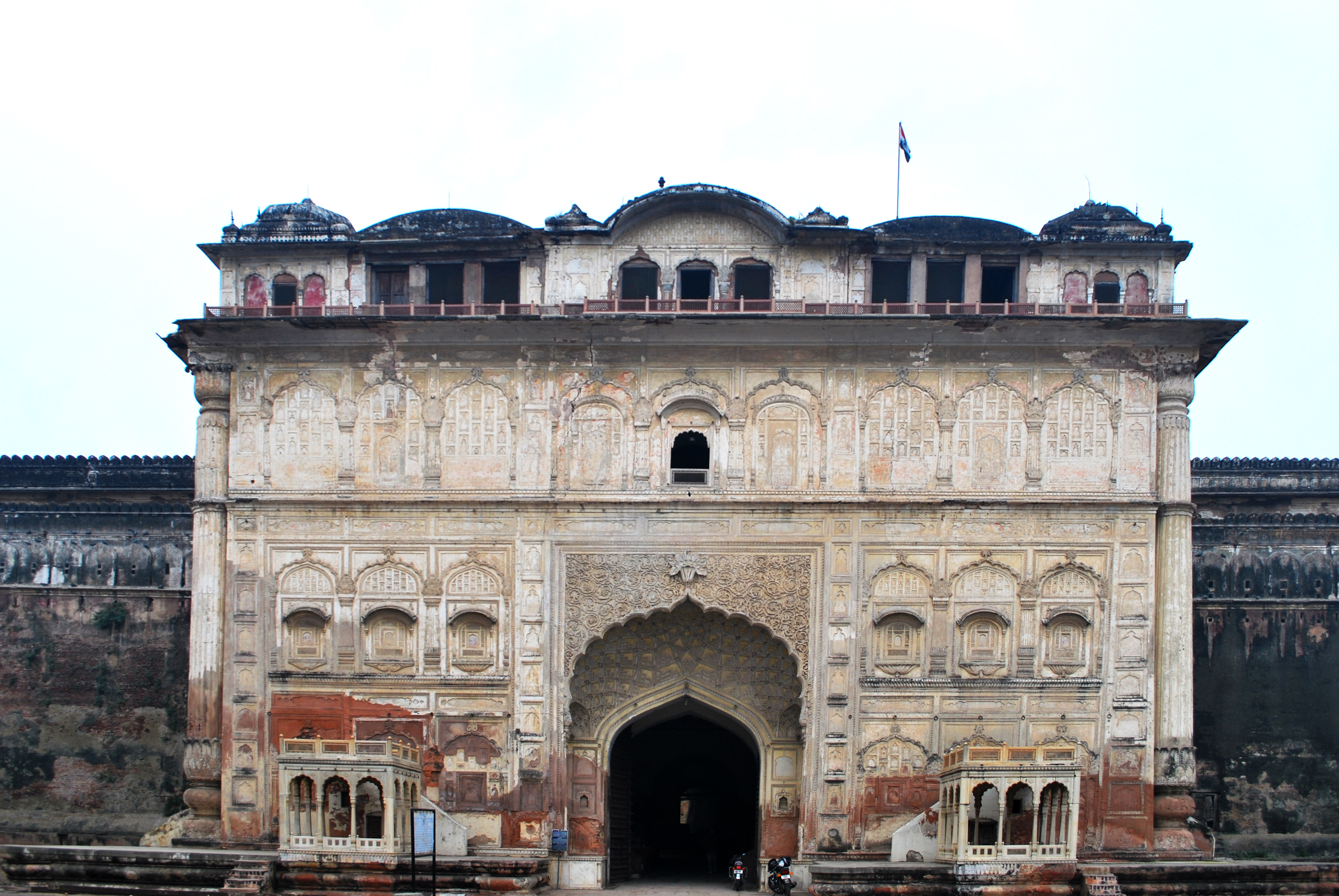
- The Main Gate of Qila Mubarak in 2012
- Interactive map of Qila Mubarak
- 30°19′27″N 76°24′03″E
- Type: Royal palace of Patiala State
- Location: Patiala, Punjab, India

Site notes
- Architectural style: Sikh architecture

Qila Mubarak, (Note: note it spelling variation may include Quila Mubarak) is a fortress of Sikh architecture in Patiala, Punjab, India. It was the residential palace of the Maharaja of Patiala. It is mostly disused now and in poor condition. Much of the fortress is closed-off to public access, including its Shish Mahal. However, there is public access to the Darbar Hall (now a museum), Sarad Khana, Jalau Khana, and cannon-barrels on-display. According to the World Monuments Fund, it was among the 100 most endangered sites in the world in 2004.

== Etymology ==
The name Qila Mubarak means "fort of felicity" in Persian.

== History ==
Qila Mubarak was first built as a 'Kachigarhi' (mud and brick fortress) by Sidhu Jat ruler Baba Ala Singh in 1763, who was the founder of the Patiala branch of the Phulkian dynasty. Ala Singh used revenue collected from the city of Sirhind, which had been conquered a few years earlier, for the construction of the fort. Later, it was reconstructed in baked bricks. It is said that the original fort created in 1763 was an extension built on top of an already existing Mughal fortress built by governor Hussain Khan in Patiala. Over a period of a century and a half, additions were made to the complex by successive rulers of Patiala in various architectural styles. The interior portion of Qila, which is known as Qila Androon is built by Maharaja Amar Singh. Meanwhile, the outer portions were constructed under Maharaja Karam Singh. Karam Singh constructed the Ranivas. Architects, artists, and carpenters from Jaipur were hired for the work during the reign of Karam Singh. The complex also served as the residence for residence of Maharaja Sahib Singh (1781–1813), Maharaja Karam Singh (1813–45), and Maharaja Narinder Singh (1845-62).

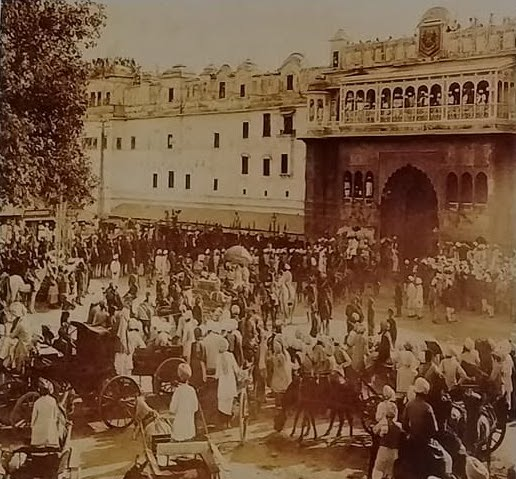
Photograph of the Maharaja's procession leaving the Qila Mubarak in Patiala, circa late 19th or early 20th century

According to Atsushi Ikeda, the Qila Mubarak was constructed during the reign of Karam Singh and renovated by his successor, Narinder Singh, who was a patron of the arts. The site began to be neglected after the ruling family moved its residence from it to a newer palace outside the old town in the 1840s, with only dependent relatives remaining at Qila Mubarak. In 1859, Maharaja Narinder Singh constructed the Darbar Hall of the complex. The complex remained in use by the public until the first half of the 20th century. After the independence of India in 1947, the Punjab government used the complex to house some of its offices. However, it was vacated in the 1960s and since has fallen into a state of decay. The complex has been protected on a regional level since 1964 (under the Punjab Ancient and Historical Monuments and Archeological Sites and Remains Act) and at a national level since 1994 (based upon Article 49 of the Indian Constitution). Due to this protection status, the site is closed off to the public. Some sections of the complex have become discoloured or collapsed (such as the Bagh Ghar and Ran Baas) due to neglect by the responsible government authorities (such as the Archaeological Survey of India and Department of Cultural Affairs, Archaeology and Museums) and weather. The decay of the site has been attributed to the passage of time, complex politics, inheritance, and lack of preservation funds. It is also threatened by urban development projects.

It is usually closed to visitors. In the 1990s, a miniature painting depicting Guru Gobind Singh was stolen from the Shish Mahal area of the Ranivas. The site was included in the 2004 World Monuments Watch. In 2004, some miniature paintings from the Ran Vaas were stolen. The complex is now surrounded by market places. A heritage walk focused on the site led by Puneet Kaur Virk was conducted by Sahapedia in 2019. A renovated Ran Baas opened in 2025 as a heritage hotel.

== Complex ==
The complex is expansive and is located in the heart of the Old City of Patiala, near the Adalat Bazaar, Bajaj Bazaar, Gur Mandi, Shah Nashin Bazaar, and Anardana Chowk. The residential palace of the royal family of Patiala, Qila Mubarak complex is built over 10-acre (40,000 m^{2}) or 4.64 hectares in the heart of the city. The site contains two main sections, the inner fort (Qila Androon) and outer fort. The complex can be divided into sub-sections with five main buildings, such as the Ran Baas (royal guest house), Mardana (men's quarters), Zenana (women's quarters), Ranivas (queens' lounge), Shish Mahal, Masnad Hall (audience hall), the Darbar Hall (where the royals ruled, the Divan Khana), the Qila Androon (royal residence), Lassi Khana (kitchen or royal pantry), Putli Ghar (pupper house), Bagh Ghar (garden house), Rang Mahal (now used for private dinners), Naqqar Khana, the Sard Khana (underground freezer), and Jalaun Khana (jewellery storage). The former Darbar Hall is now a museum. The Ranivas was originally a reception area for noble visitors and a wedding hall but was transformed into a women's quarters in the early 20th century by Maharaja Bhupinder Singh to accommodate his many wives. The Sarad Khana was for European guests while the Jalau Khana was an exhibition hall, which features ionic-columns. There are different palaces and courtyards within the complex. The eastern courtyard was for public events (such as artistic and musical performances) while the western courtyard was private. There is also underground sewerage system in the complex and a natural air-conditioning system. There are three royal platforms at the site, located at the back wall of a public audience hall consisting of deep alcoves. There are two tunnels, one connecting to Bahadurgarh Fort some 35 kilometres away, and connecting to the Shahi Samadhan (royal crematory grounds). The outer walls of the fortresses house shops (some of whose families had served the rulers of Patiala). There is also the Cannon Park, which contains cannons. A 200-year-old Maulsari tree is present.

=== Qila Androon ===
Qila Androon has 13 royal chambers with scenes from Hindu mythology painted in the Patiala art style. Its architecture is a mixture of Rajasthani and Mughal elements. Within the Qila Androon is the Shish/Sheesh Mahal pavilion. This section houses a sacred fire (known as the Akhand Jyot) sourced from the Jwalamukhi temple in the Himalayas, brought by Baba Ala Singh. As per local lore, as long as the fire burns, the city of Patiala shall flourish and be protected. The fire is protected by priests.

=== Darbar Hall ===
The Darbar Hall now houses a museum. The Darbar Hall contains rare cannons, swords, shields and maces, daggers of Guru Gobind Singh, and sword of Nadir Shah.

=== Shish Mahal ===
The hall of mirrors (Shish Mahal) is located in a private section of the men's quarters (mardana). It is decorated with mirrorwork and frescoes. It is very similar to the stand-alone Sheesh Mahal of Patiala (perhaps completed by the same artists). The murals depict the Bihari-Satsai and Baramasa series, along with depictions of Indic deities.

== Artwork ==
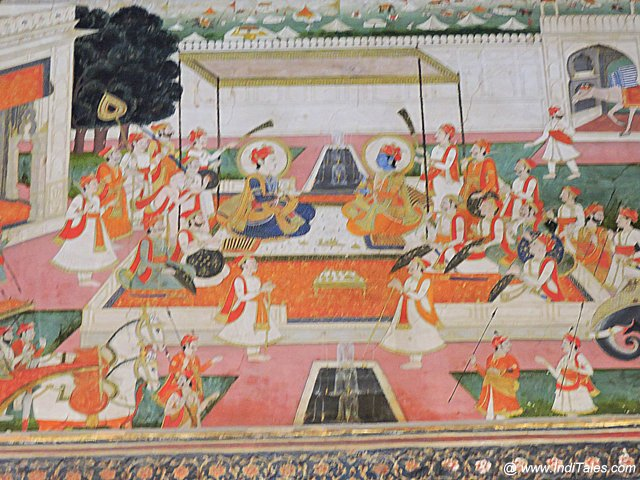
Mural painting depicting a Vaishnavist scene from Indic mythology from Qila Mubarak, Patiala

The complex is home to Sikh mural artwork that depict political, religious, and mythological scenes. All together, the complex contains 1,090 thematic murals spread across fifteen rooms and on two exterior terraces of two buildings of the complex (Qila Androon and Ranivas). These murals were likely painted between 1825–1850, during the reigns of Maharaja Karam Singh and Narinder Singh, however some artwork may date to the late 18th century. Artists belonging to the Mughal, Kangra, Shekhawati, Awadhi, and Jaipuri schools of art were hired to paint its interiors. The artists were Paharis, Kashmiris, and Rajasthanis although few of their biographical details, such as names, are known. The complex features fourteen painted chambers, with varying panel scenes. The complex's walls are adorned with mural paintings in the form of frescoes. The paintings depict rulers of Patiala holding private audiences (ancestor portraits), and others exhibit Vaishnavist themes (specifically Krishanite), which played a talismanic role for the Patiala ruling dynasty. Also depicted are Sikh (such as the Chaubis Avatar Varnan figures from the Dasam Granth), Jain (tirthankars), and Buddhist themes. Some have attributed the Krishna-themed works to the "slackness" of Sikh patrons or their artists in the 19th century unable to innovate or the conventionalization of Krishna, however Kavita Singh cautions against this approach and instead sees royal identification with Krishna, with them venerating Krishna as an ancestor (their traditional genealogy traces their lineage to Yadu), celebrating his kingship qualities as a way of celebrating their own. Krishna is depicted as a "role model of a good, just, and caring king". During the reign of Karam Singh, artists from Jaipur likely were hired to decorate the complex. Karam Singh's successor Narinder Singh continued with artistic patronage, who had the complex redecorated around the same time he built the Sheesh Mahal.

== Architecture ==
The complex features a mixture of Sikh, Mughal, and Rajput architecture. The Qila Androon and Ran Baas were built in the late Mughal and Rajput style while the Jalau Khana and Darbar Hall were built in the colonial and European styles. The three-storied site was built with nanakshahi and lakhori bricks, lime mortar, and is coated with lime plaster. Its entrance contains an arched opening. Other architectural elements include plastered stuccowork, sculpted balconies, tall walls, wooden doors, Gothic arches, murals, mirrorwork, crafted columns, buttresses, white cupolas, brick masonry, painted ceilings, columns, reflective Aleppo mirrored panels and gilding, chini khanas, chhatris, jharokhas, sheesh mahals, with connecting corridors between the various sections. The rooms of the complex complex around the courtyards. The arcade is in the late Mughal style with formal charbaghs at the ground level. The upstair pavilions are built in the Rajput style with terraces. A rooftop bungalow is in the Victorian Neo-Gothic style with a thunderbox to house the ruler's armoury. A gothic-influenced part of the site was built for the Irish-born queen of Maharaja Rajinder Singh, Florence Maharani (Maharani Harnam Kaur née Florence Gertrude Bryan). The post-renovation Ran Baas is in the modern and minimalist styles, including modern Punjabi baroque. However, a feature of Indian interior architecture consists of the construction of many rooms without a specific purpose, whose original use is now difficult to define but can be clued through the remains and types of furniture present and the arrangement of hangings, carpets, and cushions.

== Restoration work ==
Being a 300-year-old building, the Qila is described as being in 'bad shape' and has been extensively damaged. The fortress was described by the World Monuments Fund as one of world's 100 "most endangered monuments" in year 2004. In February 2009, 10 million rupees were allocated to the Archaeological Survey of India and the Department of Cultural Affairs, Archaeology and Museums, Punjab for the maintenance of the fort. 830,000 rupees were sought from the Finance Department for repairs and 1.9 million rupees for the section where Ala Singh's sacred fire is kept.

Restoration work of Qila has been undertaken by Indian National Trust for Arts and Cultural Heritage, which has been financially assisted by the state and national governments INTACH's restoration also focused on the site's mural artwork. Archaeological Survey of India. The World Monuments Watch has also funded its preservation. In 2013, a restoration project by Abha Narain Lambah Associates of the complex began with funding provided by the Central Government 13th Finance Commission Grants. The Punjab Bureau of Investment Promotion tendered part of the Qila Mubarak for a restoration project, which was acquired by Apeejay Surrendra Park Hotels, which took possession in 2021. They hired Abha Narain Lambah, who had previously completed restoration work at the site.

Post restoration in 2021, Ran Baas, the former guest house for the Maharaja of Patiala was developed into a 28-room luxury boutique hotel by The Park Hotels group. The renovation of the Ran Baas was carried out by Priya Paul and Abha Narain Lambah and opened in 2025 as a heritage hotel.

== Gallery ==
Film footage of palaces and fortresses of Patiala, Punjab, by Roger Dumas, circa November–December 1927

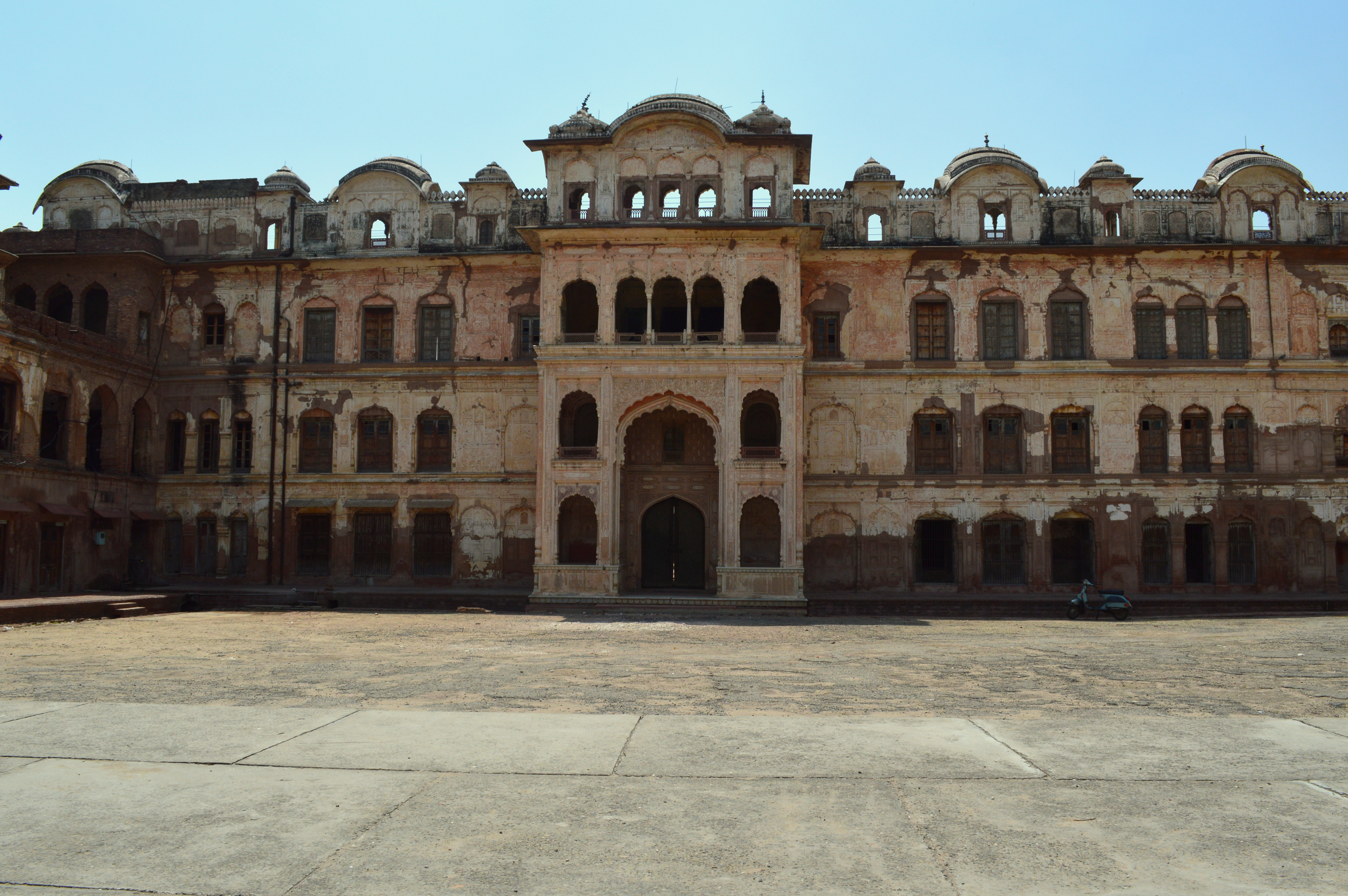
Qila Mubarak on 21 June 2013

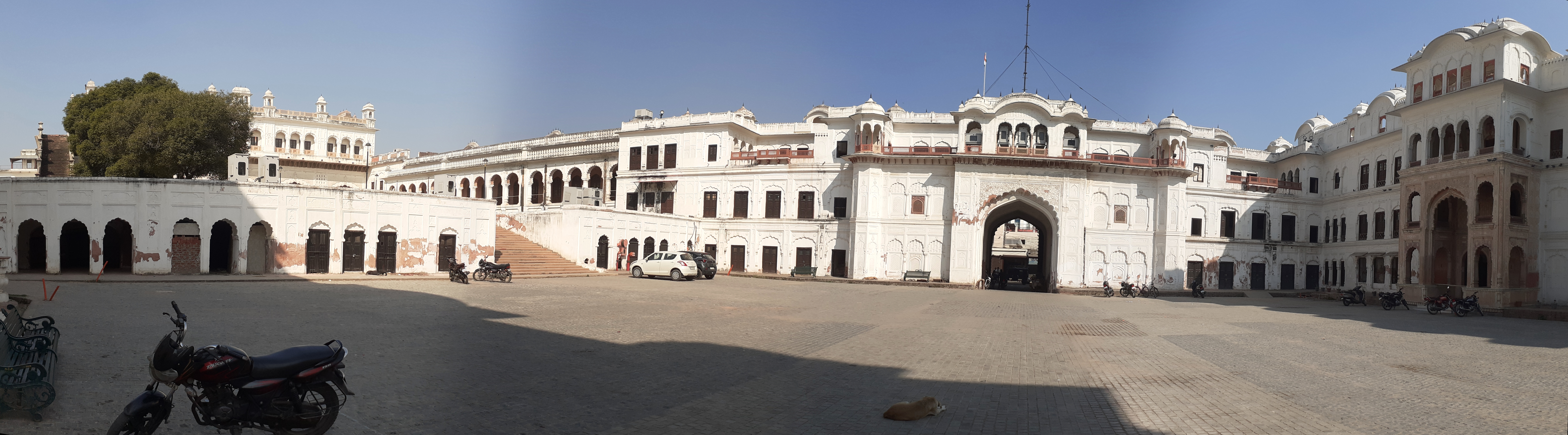
Qila Mubarak in 2022

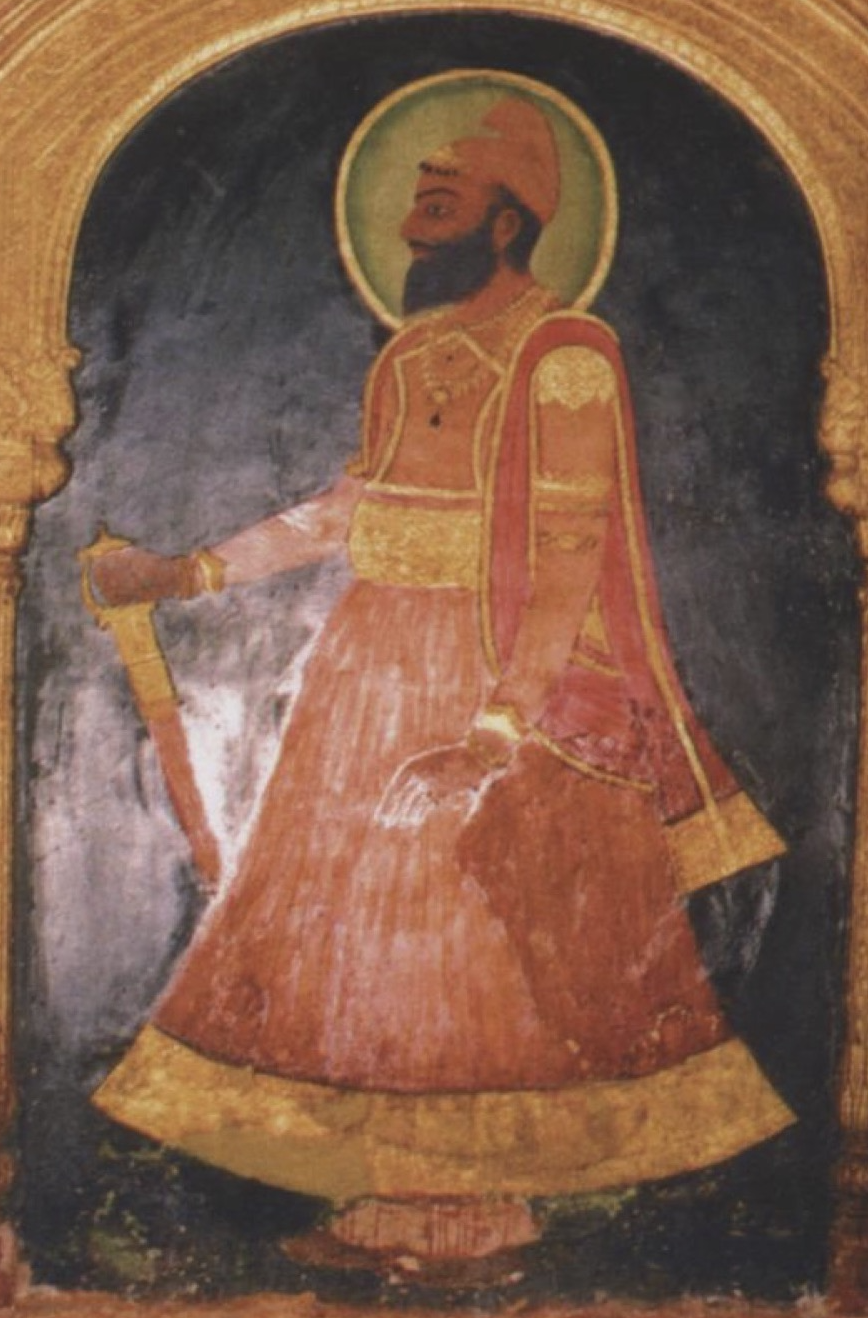
Mural painting of Maharaja Karam Singh in the Audience Hall of Qila Mubarak, Patiala

== See also ==
- Moti Bagh Palace
- Bahadurgarh Fort
