= William Grey (governor) =

English administrator

Sir William Grey
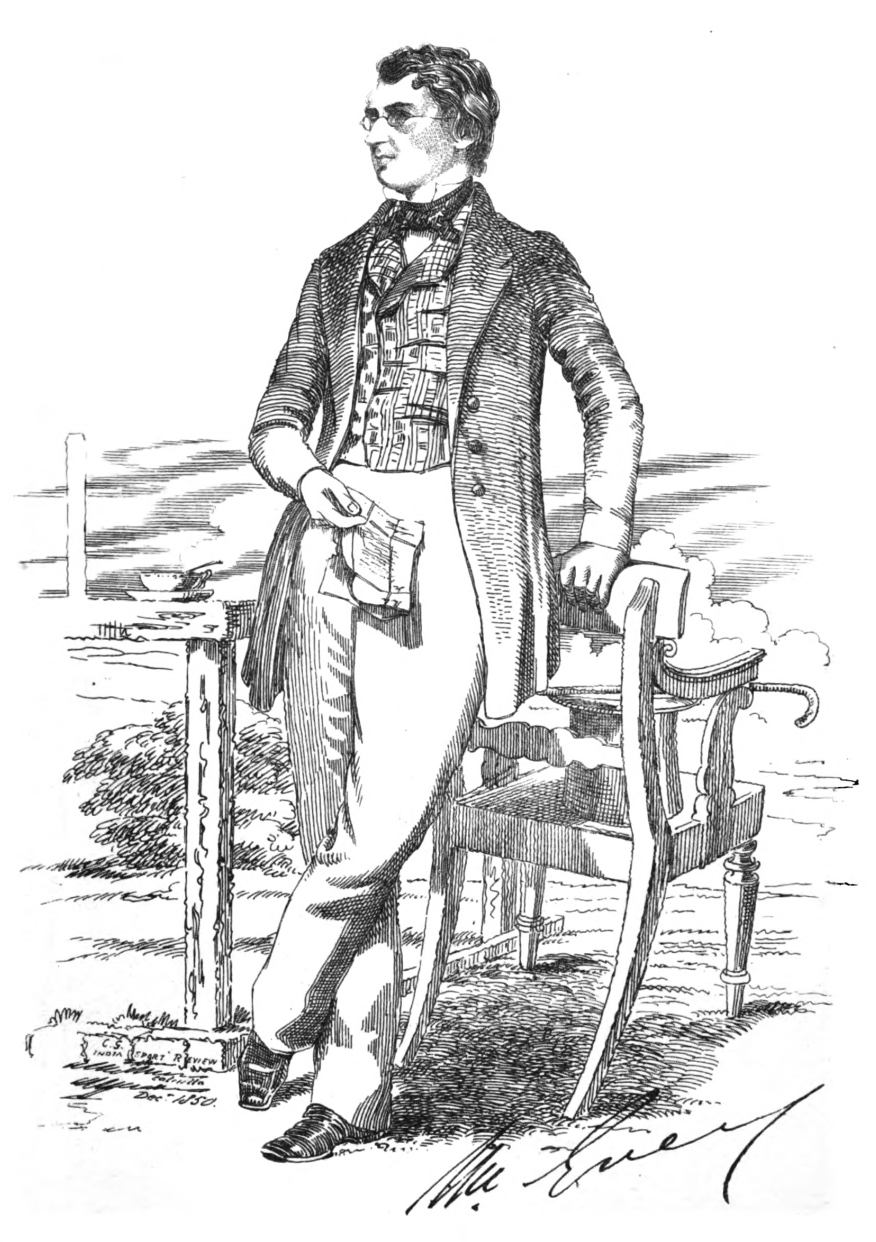
- Portrait by Colesworthey Grant

Governor of Jamaica
- In office 1874–1877
- Monarch: Queen Victoria
- Preceded by: John Peter Grant
- Succeeded by: Anthony Musgrave

Personal details
- Born: 1818 Northumberland, England
- Died: May 15, 1878 (aged 59–60)
- Education: Christ Church, Oxford (did not graduate)
- Occupation: Colonial administrator and Governor

Sir William Grey KCSI (1818 – 15 May 1878) was an English administrator of the East India Company in India. He served as Lieutenant-Governor of Bengal from 1867 and later as Governor of Jamaica.

== Early life and education ==
Grey was born in 1818, the fourth son of The Hon. Edward Grey, Bishop of Hereford, and Charlotte Croft. His paternal grandfather was Charles Grey, 1st Earl Grey. His paternal uncle was, therefore, Charles Grey, 2nd Earl Grey (1764–1845), Prime Minister.

Grey studied at Christ Church, Oxford, but did not complete studies and joined the War Office as a clerk. Nominated to work in the Bengal civil service, he entered Haileybury College in January 1839 and passed out in July 1840. During his first term, he was suspended for late night parties in his room but made up for it in later terms.

== Career ==
Grey went to Bengal in 1840 and worked for a while in various offices before becoming a private secretary to the deputy governor, Sir Herbert Maddock in 1845. In 1851, he became secretary of the Bank of Bengal. He became a secretary to the government of Bengal in 1854. He went on furlough to England in January 1857 but was forced back by the rebellion in that year. He was appointed director general of the post office in 1859 after holding various temporary offices. In 1862, he became a member of the council of the governor-general of Bengal. In 1867, he succeeded Sir Cecil Beadon to become lieutenant-governor of Bengal.

As an administrator, he opposed excessive centralization and helped decentralise the postal department. He opposed the application of income-tax rules in India. He often held opposing views to those of the governor-general Sir John Lawrence. He felt that the use of land cess to support education was unjust to the landholders. His position did not find favour with Lord Mayo. He was made Knight Commander of The Most Exalted Order of the Star of India in the 1870 Birthday Honours. He retired in 1871 and returned to England. In 1874, he was appointed Governor of Jamaica. He served as governor until 1877.

== Death and personal life ==
Grey died on 15 May 1878, his estate proven by probate. He was married in 1865 to Georgina (Nina) Chichele Plowden, daughter of Trevor John Chichele Plowden. They had two daughters: the eldest of whom, Sybil Frances (1867-1945), married Sir William Eden, 7th Bart. and was mother to Anthony Eden; while Dorothy Evelyn (1875-1951) was married to Viscount Selby.
