= Rajinder Singh of Patiala =

Maharaja of Patiala from 1876–1900

Rajinder Singh
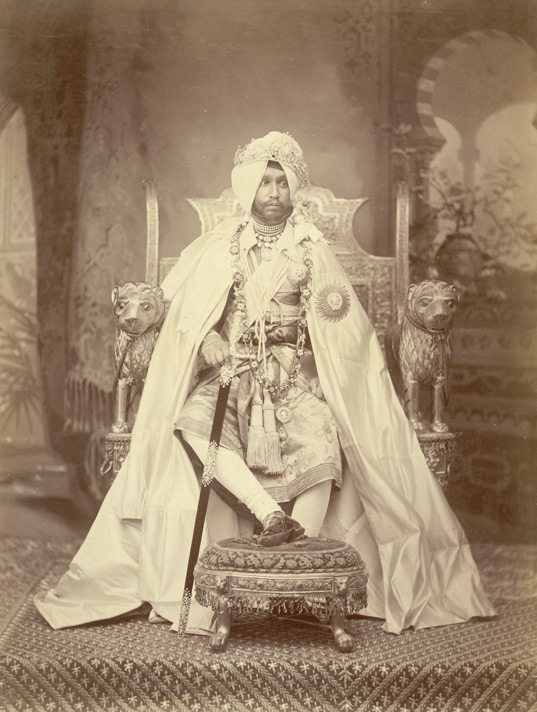
- Rajinder Singh c. 1898

Maharaja of Patiala
- Reign: 1876 – 1900
- Predecessor: Mahendra Singh
- Successor: Bhupinder Singh
- Born: 25 May 1872
- Died: 8 November 1900 (aged 28)
- Wives: Jasmer Kaur Manshahia; Florence Bryan
- Issue: Bhupinder Singh; Birendra Singh
- Dynasty: Phulkian
- Father: Mahendra Singh
- Religion: Sikhism

Sir Rajinder Singh GCSI (25 May 1872 – 8 November 1900) was the Maharaja of the princely state of Patiala from 1876 to 1900. During his reign, Singh was noted for his military service, extravagant spending habits, tense relations with the British Raj, marriage to an Irish woman named Florence Bryan, and his contributions to sports both as a player and as a financial benefactor. Singh was regarded as the leader of the Sikh community and the premier Maharaja in Punjab.

== Early life ==
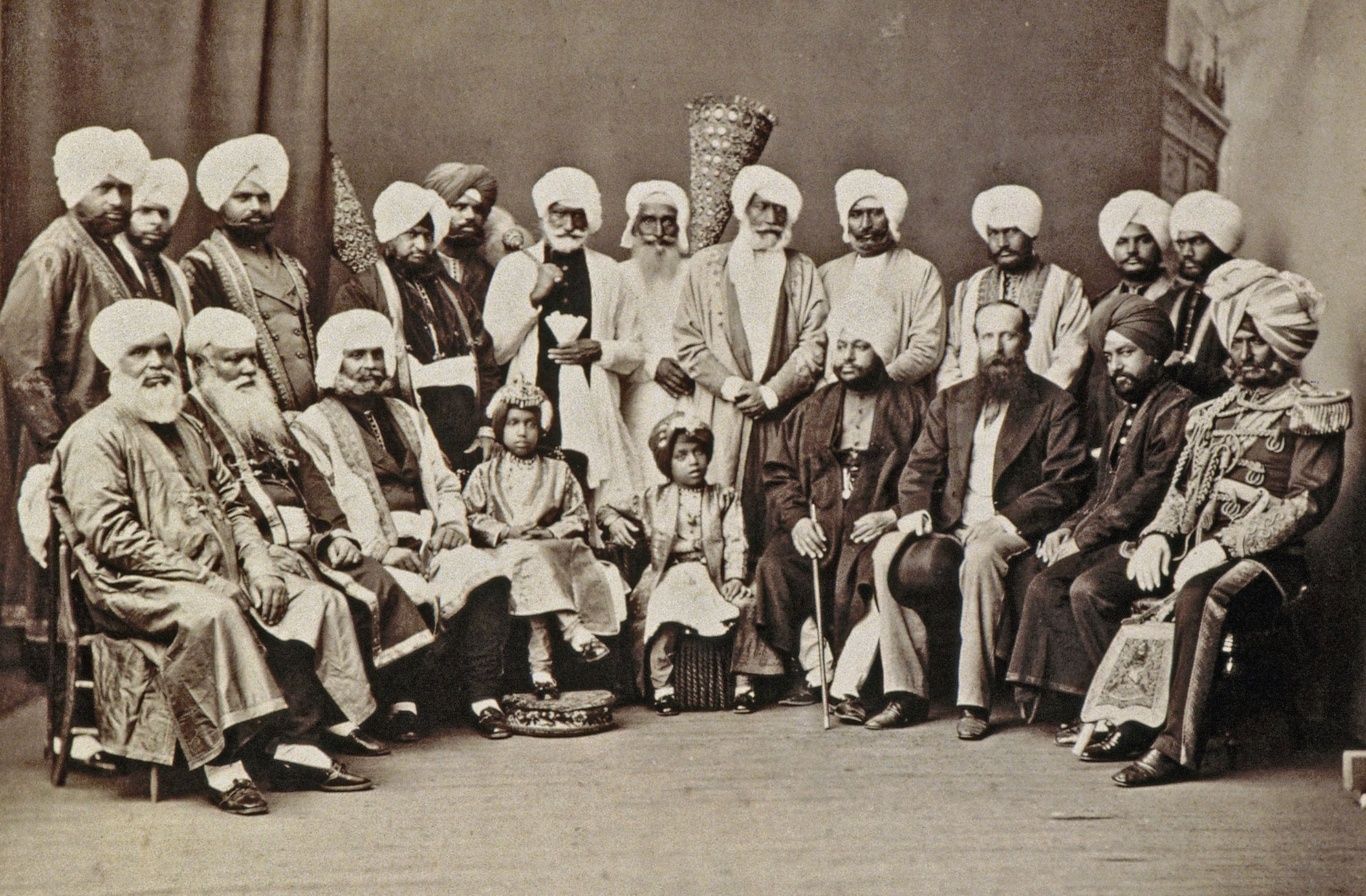
Photograph of the durbar of the young Maharaja Rajinder Singh, c. 1870s

Rajinder Singh was born on 25 May 1872. He was the son of Maharaja Mahendra Singh of Patiala and a member of the Phulkian Dynasty.

== Reign ==
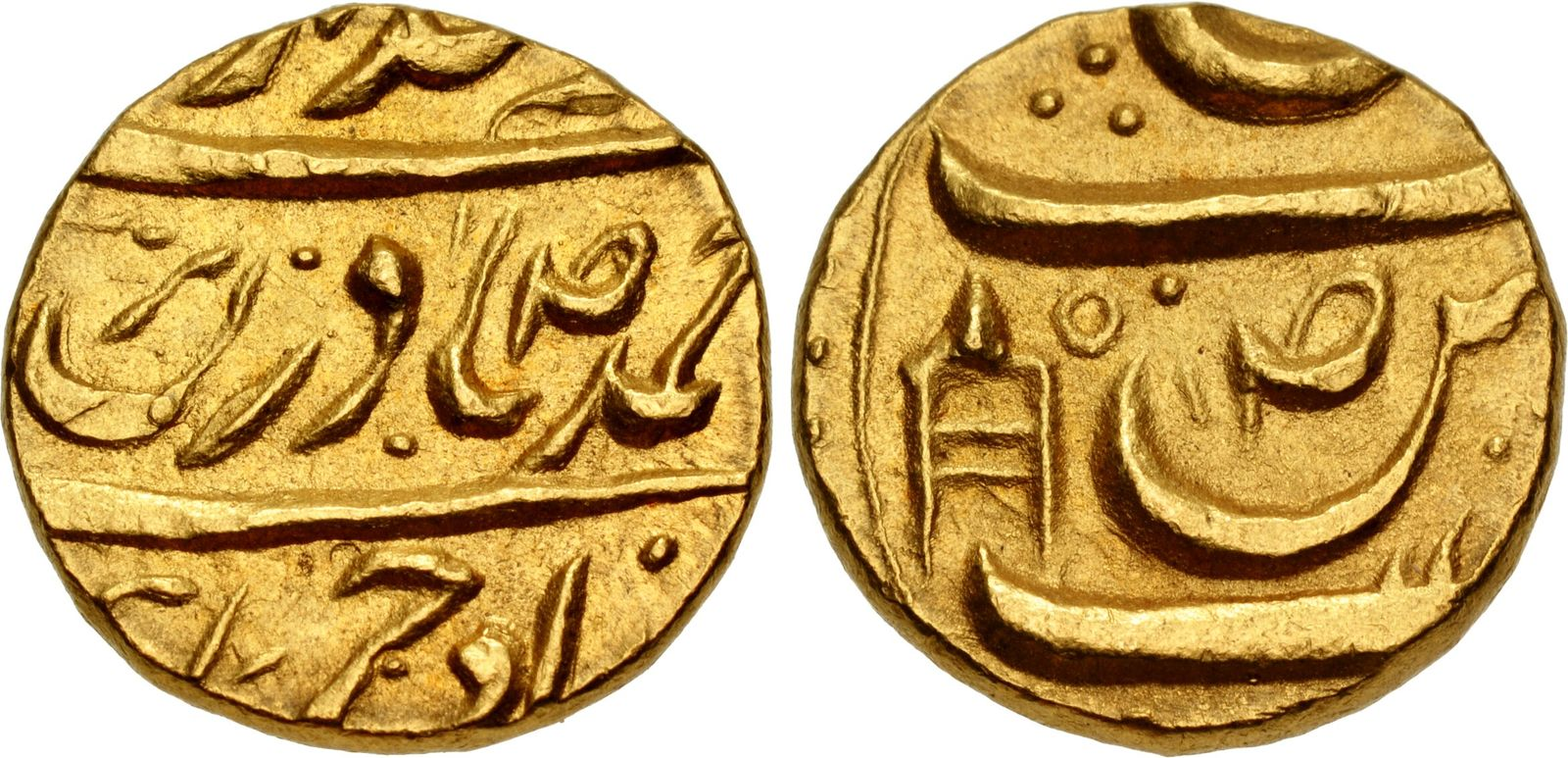
INDIA, Princely States. Patiala. Maharaja Sir Rajindar Singh. VS 1933-1957 (AD 1876-1900). AV Mohur (20mm, 10.66 g, 11h). Sirhind mint. Dated VS (19)50 (AD 1893). EF. (751 2)

Singh became the Maharaja of Patiala upon the death of his father, Mahendra Singh, in 1876. He was four years old when he ascended the throne. Singh was described as "the first reigning Prince to blend the elements of the English gentleman and Indian potentate." In the 1890s, he became one of the first Indians to own a car, a French De Dion-Bouton in 1892. He also sent a hospital ship to China.

=== Military service ===
Noted for his military service, Singh participated in the Mohmand campaign of 1897 – 1898 and in 1898, he was awarded the Knight Grand Commander of the Order of the Star of India (GCSI) by the British Raj for his service during the campaign. He also offered support for the British Empire's administration in the Transvaal Colony.

=== Sports ===
Singh was known for his contribution to sports. He owned and played for his own cricket team against other Indian princes. In Chail, now in Himachal Pradesh, which was Singh's summer residence, he constructed the Chail Cricket Ground. The Chail Cricket Ground is the highest cricket ground in the world and the construction required leveling a mountaintop that is 8,000 feet high. He was also known for playing polo and was described as the best polo player in India. While playing for his own polo team, Singh won the Indian Open Championship in 1899. Singh played field hockey and English billiards as well.

=== Relations with the British ===
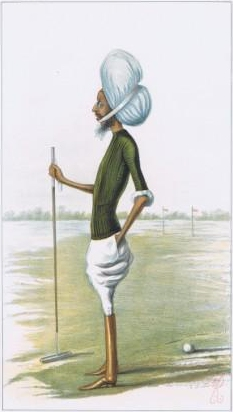
A caricature of Rajinder Singh in the British magazine Vanity Fair, 1900

However, despite Singh's cooperation with and service to the British, his actions, including neglecting the administration of his own state and extravagant spending habits, caused controversy with the British Raj. By Singh's reign, the Maharaja of Patiala had come to be regarded as the leader of the Sikh community and the premier prince in Punjab. This, coupled with the fact that half of the British Indian Army at the time were Sikhs, troubled the British colonial administration as Singh would refuse to listen to their warnings or advice.

== Personal life and family ==
Singh was known to have at least married twice. His first wife, Jasmer Kaur Manshahia, was the mother of his heir and successor as Maharaja, Bhupinder Singh. Jasmer Kaur Manshahia died of tuberculosis and allegedly, due to grief that Singh had taken another wife. Singh's younger son was Birendra Singh. Singh's younger brother, Ranbir Singh, was awarded the Knight Commander of the Order of the Star of India (KCSI) and he served on the Imperial Legislative Council. In 1903, Ranbir Singh donated his estates in Kasauli, now in Himachal Pradesh, for the Indian Pasteur Institute, which later became the Central Research Institute, Kasauli.

In 1893, Singh married Florence Bryan, the daughter of his Irish horse stable superintendent and persuaded her to convert to Sikhism. He married Florence Bryan, who became known as Florence Maharani, despite protests and warnings from the British. The British Raj refused to recognize the child that the marriage produced. In 1894, his child with Florence Maharani was poisoned to death and in 1895, Florence Maharani died under mysterious circumstances.

He was a close friend of William Beresford and of Frederick Roberts. The Irish composer Thomas O'Brien Butler (1861–1915), who spent some time in India, dedicated a song composition to him.

Singh died on 8 November 1900. Doctors attributed his death to alcoholism. Singh’s granddaughter through his younger son, Birendra Singh, was Naresh Inder Kumari, who married Hardev Singh Chhina, who, after India’s independence in 1947, became an Indian Administrative Service officer and later served as the Chief Secretary of Punjab. The son of Naresh Inder Kumari and Hardev Singh Chhina, Paramdev Singh Chhina, served as the Additional Advocate General of Punjab.
