= Bahadurgarh Fort =

Building in Punjab, India

- ਬਹਾਦੁਰਗੜ੍ਹ ਕਿਲ੍ਹਾ
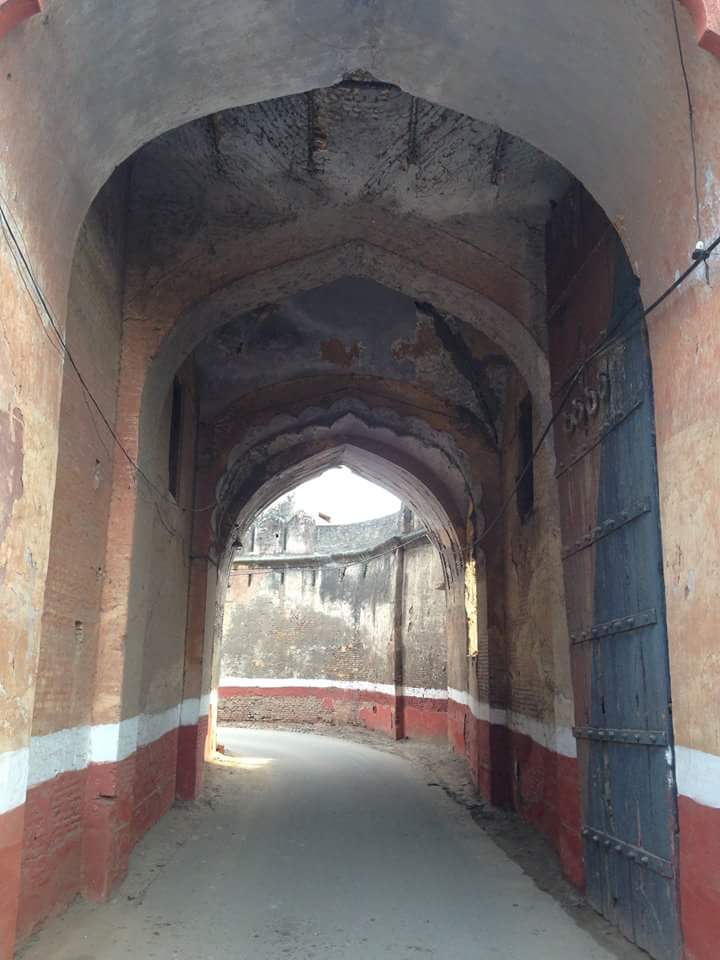
- Entrance gate of Bahadurgarh Fort
- Interactive map of Bahadurgarh Fort
- Location: 6 kilometres (3.7 mi) from Patiala city, Punjab, India.
- Coordinates: 30.3638°N 76.4708°E
- Type: Fort
- Beginning date: 1837
- Completion date: 1845
- Dedicated to: Guru Tegh Bahadur

Bahadurgarh Fort is a historical Sikh-fort near Patiala in Punjab, India. Constructed on the site of the old Saifabad Fort, which was built as the residence of Nawab Saif ud-Din Mahmud or Saif Khan, the fort was renovated by Maharaja Karam Singh of the princely state of Patiala in 1837.

== Etymology ==
The fort was named after Guru Tegh Bahadur, the ninth Guru of Sikhism, by Maharaja Karam Singh in 1837.

== Design and architecture ==
The fort is built in an area of about 21 sq kilometers in a circular shape surrounded by two ramparts and moat. The fort was built in 1658 and later renovated between 1837 and 1845 under Maharaja Karam Singh at the cost of around 100,000 rupees. The Patiala ruler also constructed Gurdwara Sri Patshahi Nauvin Sahib Qila Bahadurgarh (portions of which remain original). The site was never used as a royal residence. A tunnel connects the fort to Qila Mubarak, located thirty-five kilometres away in Patiala.

== See also ==
- Moti Bagh Palace
- Qila Mubarak, Patiala
