= Muirgheis =

Irish opera

Muirgheis is a 1903 opera by Thomas O'Brien Butler (1861–1915), written originally in the Irish language. Caving to market and political pressures of the time, the piece was mainly staged in English. Nonetheless, some consider it the first Gaeilge opera.

The libretto was written by Thadgh O'Donoghue, with an English version by Nora Chesson and George Moore.

The first full performance took place in Dublin, Theatre Royal, on 7 December 1903. The score was printed and published in New York by Breitkopf & Härtel in 1910 (plate no. L. 206.). The score is dedicated "To Clann na hÉireann".
