= Eithne (opera) =

Irish-language opera by Robert O'Dwyer

Cover of the first edition publication of Eithne (1910)

Eithne was the first full-scale opera written and performed in the Irish language. It was composed by Irish composer Robert O'Dwyer.

The libretto was based on an Irish-language tale known as Éan an Cheoil Bhinn (The Bird of Sweet Music), adapted by Galway Reverend Thomas O'Kelly. It covers two acts and includes in its complex plot the presence of stepbrothers, a divine descent to earth and the transformation of a queen into a bird.

== Performance history ==
The work saw its first performance at the Round Room in Dublin's Rotunda during Oireachtas na Gaeilge, an Eisteddfod-inspired festival of Irish culture, in 1909, conducted by the composer. It was performed again in May 1910 at the Gaiety Theatre, Dublin.

In 2017, a concert performance of Eithne was given at the National Concert Hall in Dublin. It featured an all-Irish cast including the RTÉ National Symphony Orchestra, and led to calls for a full staging.

Regarding the unfamiliarity of the Irish language in the operatic world, the Irish Times noted that "Crucially, the Irish sounded wonderful, appearing to lend itself to operatic declamation with no less ease than do Italian or German, Russian or Czech."

== Roles ==
Role	Voice type	Premiere cast, 2 August 1909 Conductor: Robert O'Dwyer
Taoiseach	baritone	
Árd-Rí na hÉireann		
Art, son of Árd-Rí na hÉireann	bass	
Nuala	mezzo-soprano or contralto	
Ceart, son of Árd-Rí na hÉireann	tenor	Andrew Tyrrell (1909), Joseph O'Mara (1910)
Neart, son of Árd-Rí na hÉireann	tenor	
An Fathach, giant/ogre		
Eithne, princess of Tír na nÓg	soprano	Evelyn Duffy
An Ri, King of Tír na nÓg, Eithne's father		J. O Carroll Reynolds
Úna		Annie Little
Duffach		Art Ward
Chorus

== Synopsis ==
In the first act, the plot centres around the High King of Ireland and the election of his heir. Though the warriors wholeheartedly nominate Ceart (the eldest son of the High King), Duffach and his supporters contend that Ceart is a traitor who had murdered the beloved hound of the High King. Nuala, the former nursemaid of Ceart, intervenes and tells the High King that the murder of the hound was actually carried out by Ceart's half brothers Neart and Art. The brothers confess to the murder and the High King sentences them to death. Nuala, to the dismay and anger of the crowd surrounding the High King, intervenes once more and advises the High King against sentencing Neart and Art to death. As a magical bird like motif is heard on the flutes and clarinets of the orchestra, the High King becomes more and more captivated by Nuala's words and abruptly pardons Neart and Art and declares Ceart his heir. After the pardon, the act climaxes with the High King calling for a hunt.

In the second act, the High King, entranced by the sound of a bird, wanders away from the hunt. This begins a journey wherein the High King and Ceart, along with Neart and Art, search for the bird. Upon discovering the mysterious bird, they become mesmerised. It is revealed that the bird is Eithne, a woman cursed by her father, the King of Tír na nÓg, to take that form until a powerful hero comes to win Eithne's hand in marriage. In attempting to enter Tír na nÓg, Ceart faces off against the spirit who guards the gate and successfully overpowers the spirit to gain entry. A further battle with the King of Tír na nÓg ensues and, with the help of a magical sword, Ceart defeats the King. Over the course of the opera, we come to understand that Nuala is the wife of the King of Tír na nÓg and that she had been cursed to live a mortal life by the King during a fit of rage. The King and Queen of Tír na nÓg are ultimately re-united and the spell is broken.

Both Eithne and Nuala ask the King of Tír na nÓg to allow her to marry Ceart but the King maintains that such a marriage cannot take place until he wins Eithne from those among his people who conspire against him. The final act culminates in a confrontation with Ceart's two half brothers on the issue of who should win Eithne's hand in marriage. Ceart ultimately claims Eithne for himself. The herald then announces the death of his father and Ceart is proclaimed as the new High King.
