= Maharaja of Patiala =

Title of the ruler of Patiala State

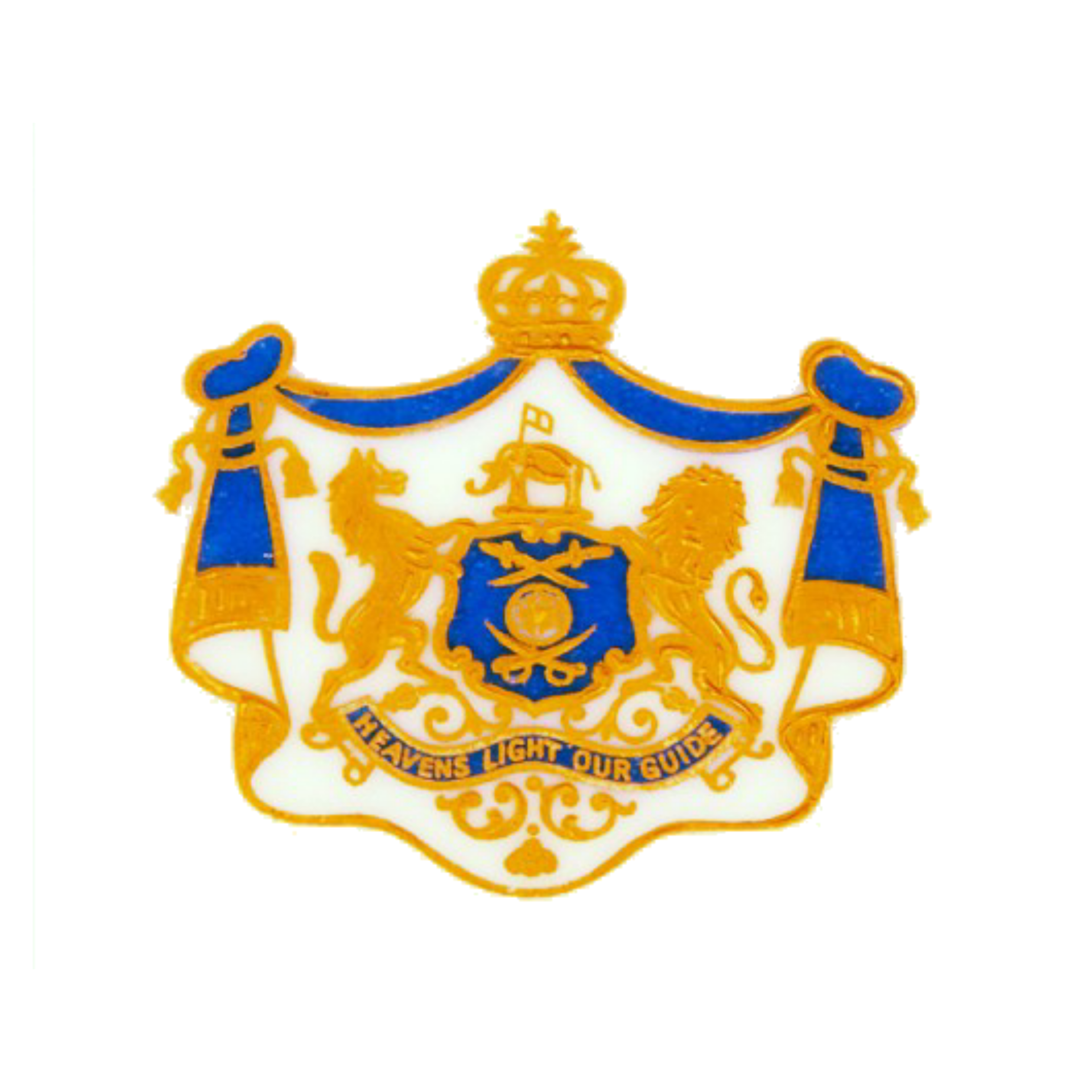

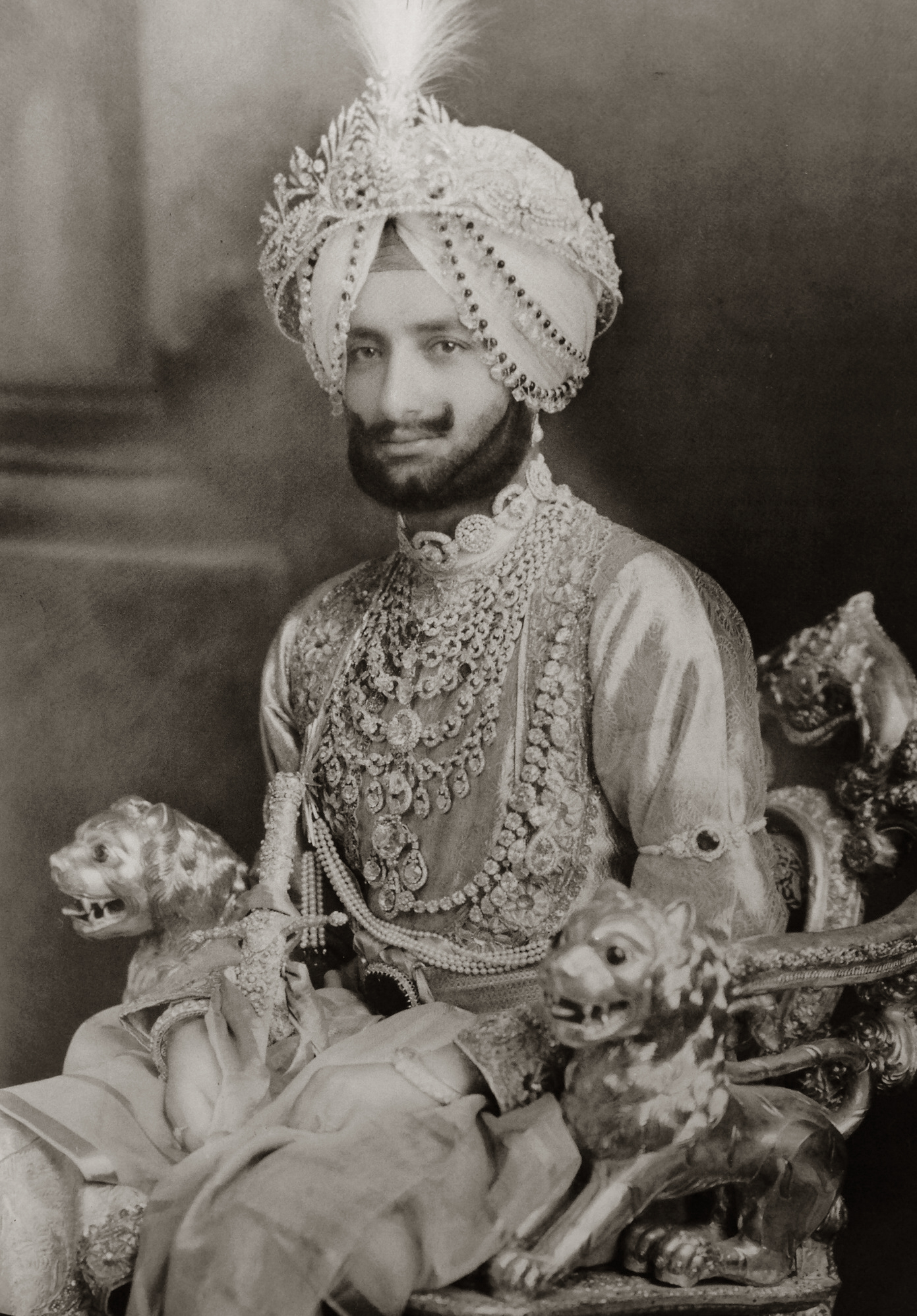
- Last to reign Yadavindra Singh; 23 March 1938 – 15 August 1947

Details
- Style: His Highness
- First monarch: Ala Singh
- Last monarch: Yadavindra Singh
- Formed: 29 March 1761
- Abolished: 28 December 1971
- Residences: Qila Mubarak, Patiala
- Pretender: Amarinder Singh

The Maharaja of Patiala was the title of the ruler of the princely state of Patiala, in British India. The first ruler of Patiala was Baba Ala Singh (1691 – 1765), who held the title of Raja. The second and third rulers, Amar Singh and Sahib Singh, respectively, held the held the title of Raja-e-Rajgan (King of Kings). Karam Singh, the fourth ruler, was the first ruler of Patiala who held the title of Maharaja. By the time of the seventh Maharaja, Rajinder Singh (1876 – 1900), the Maharaja of Patiala was recognized as the leader of the Sikh community and the most foremost prince in Punjab. During the British Raj, the Patiala maharajas were entitled to a 17-gun salute and had precedence over all the other princes in Punjab.

Yadavindra Singh (1914 – 1974) became the maharaja on 23 March 1938. He was the last independent maharaja, agreeing to the accession of Patiala State into the newly independent Union of India in 1947. On 5 May 1948, he became Rajpramukh of the new Indian state of Patiala and East Punjab States Union (PEPSU). The former Patiala royal family has had multiple notable members in post-independence India, including those in politics, diplomacy, the Indian army, and other fields. The title of Maharaja of Patiala and other royal titles were retained by members of the Patiala royal family until they were abolished in 1971 through the 26th Amendment to the Constitution of India.

In 1940, Dr. V.S. Bhatti proposed the creation of a Sikh nation called 'Sikhistan,' to be led by the Maharaja of Patiala. He envisioned a "Khalistan" where the Maharaja would be aided by a cabinet comprising representatives from various federating units. These units included the central districts of Punjab province directly administered by the British at that time, including Ludhiana, Jalandhar, Ambala, Firozpur, Amritsar, and Lahore. It also encompassed the princely states of the Cis-Sutlej region, including Patiala, Nabha, Faridkot, and Malerkotla, as well as the states in the 'Shimla Group'.

After the Partition of India in 1947, a Sikh publication called The Liberator advocated for Khalistan, proposing that it should include East Punjab merged with the Patiala and East Punjab States Union (PEPSU), with the Maharaja of Patiala as its monarch.

== Origins and lineage ==
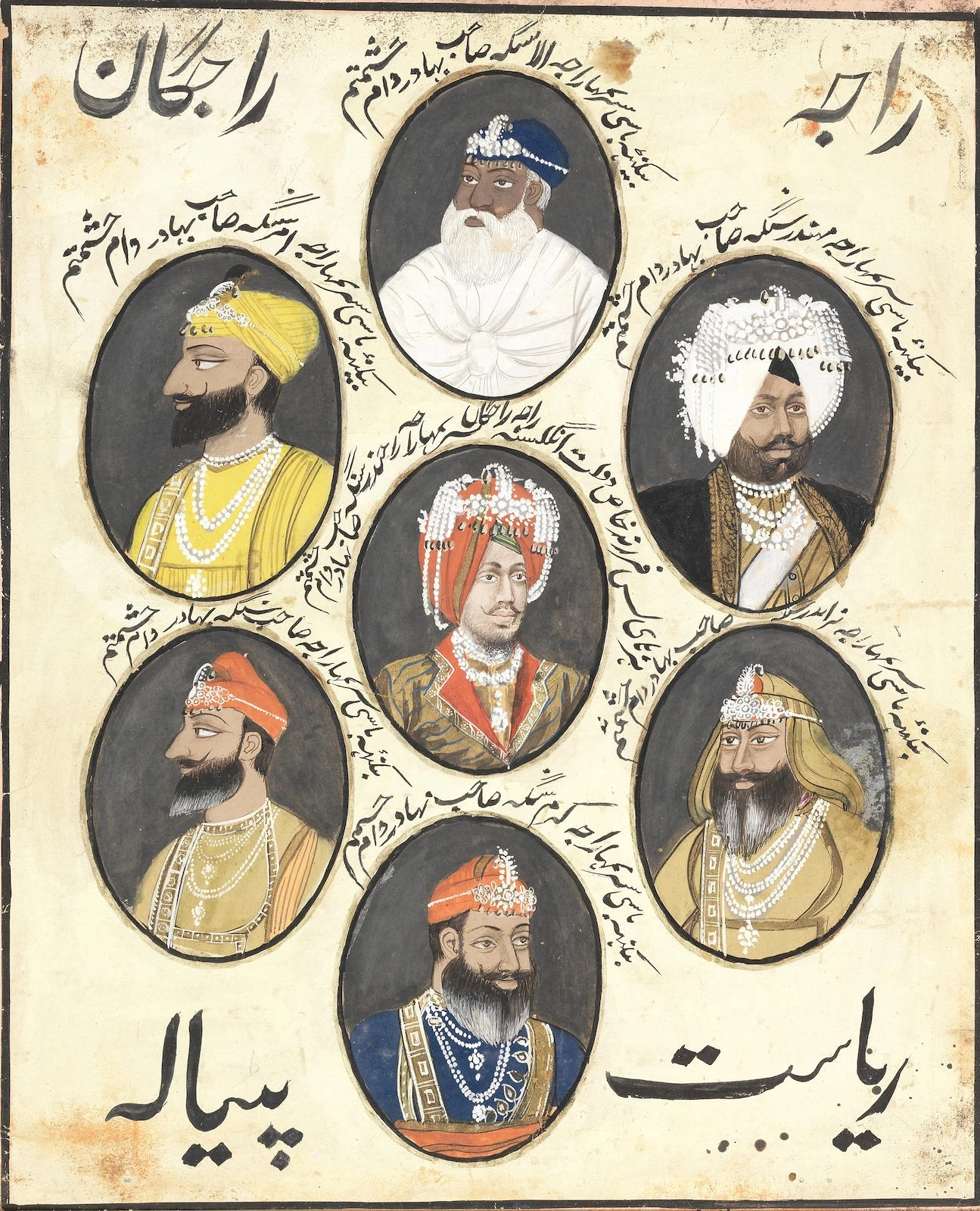
A panel of seven portraits of rulers of Patiala State. Starting anti-clockwise from top: Ala Singh, Amar Singh, Sahib Singh, Karam Singh, Narinder Singh, Mahendra Singh and in the centre is Rajinder Singh.

The Maharajas of Patiala were Jat Sikhs of the Sidhu clan. The Patiala maharajas are direct descendants of Rawal Jaisal Singh, who founded the Kingdom of Jaisalmer in 1156. The maharajas of Patiala, through Jaisal Singh's ancestor, are direct descendants of Rao Bhatti, a 3rd-century Hindu monarch. Over the centuries, some of Jaisal Singh's descendants established themselves in the Punjab region, and Khewa, a descendant of Jaisal Singh, married the daughter of a Jat Sidhu zamindar, whose children were known by their mother's caste. Khewa's descendant was Baba Phul, the common ancestor of the Phulkian dynasty, and Baba Phul's grandson was Ala Singh, the first ruler of Patiala.

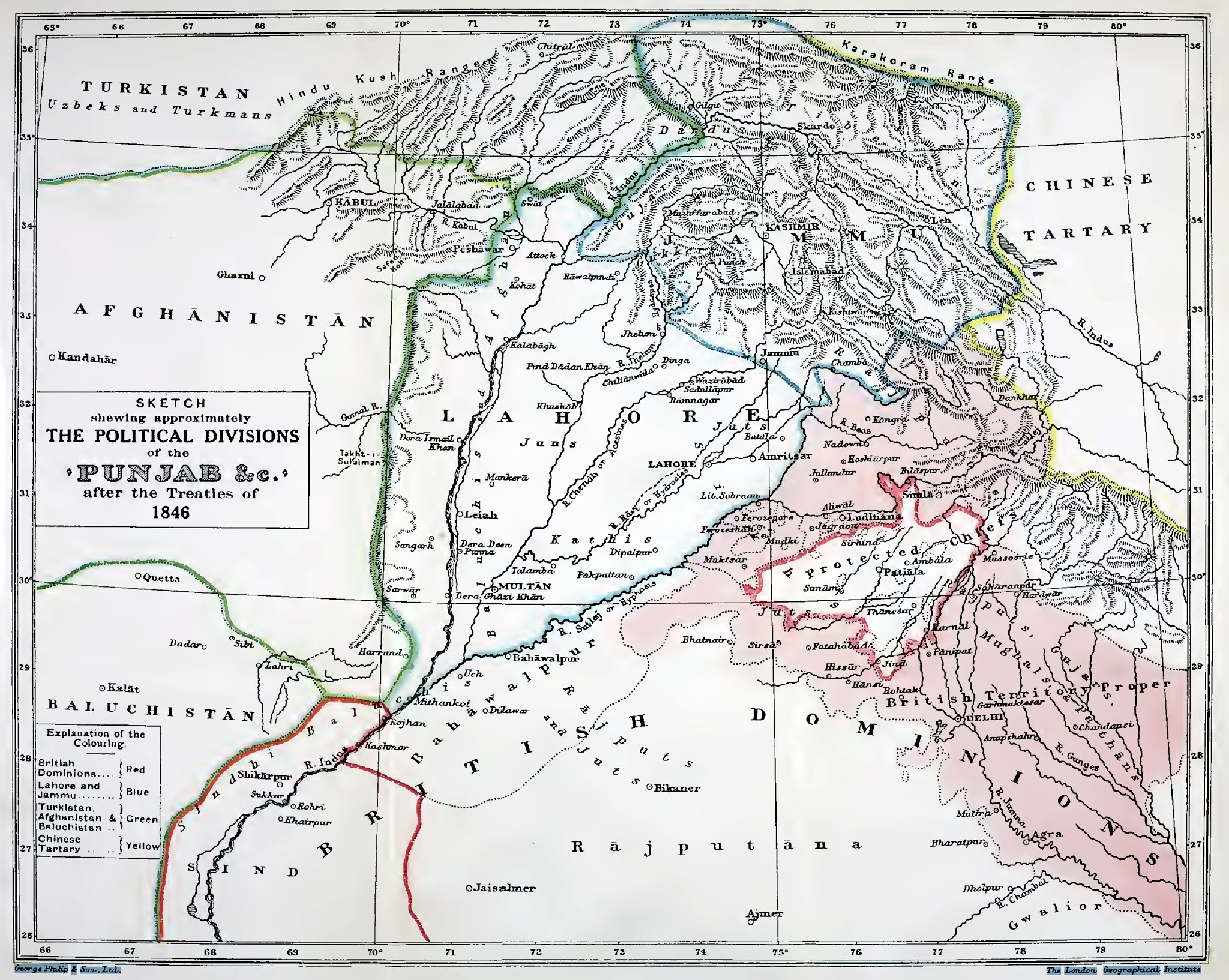
Map of the Patiala Kingdom labelled "Protected Areas" in White.

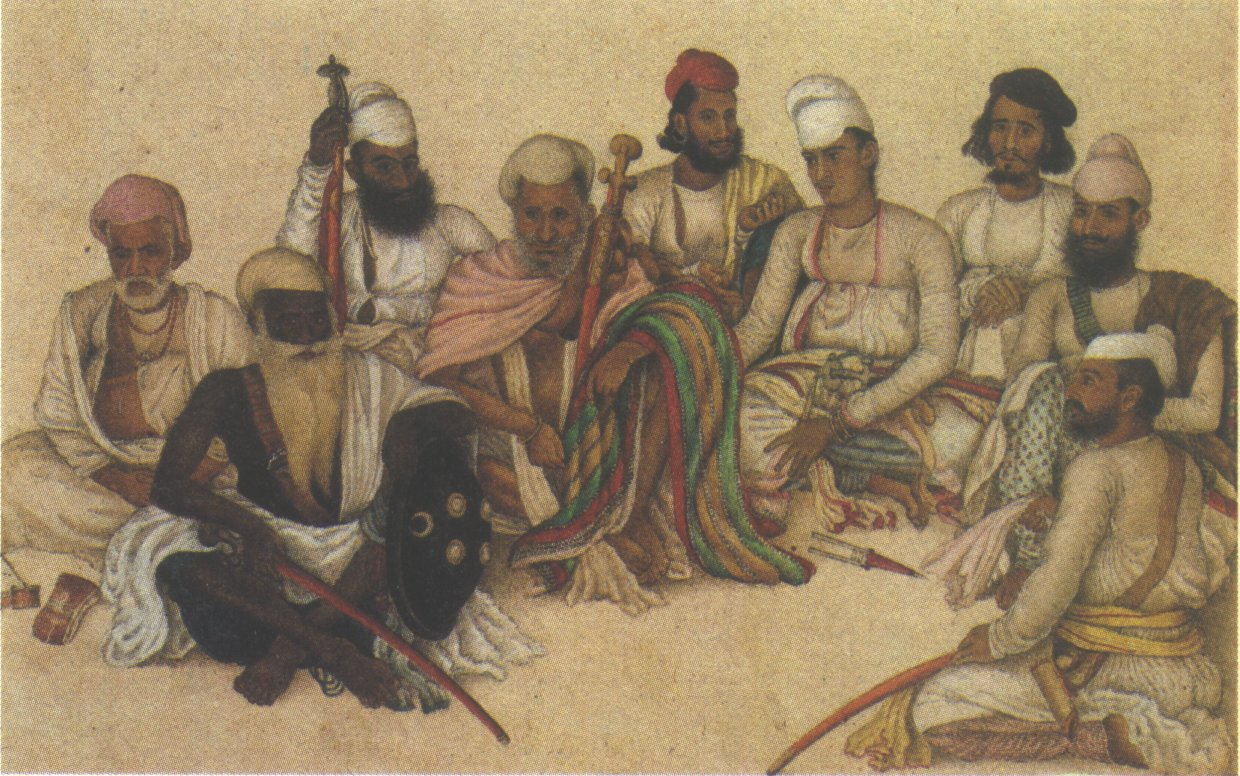
Nine courtiers and servants of the Raja of Patiala

=== Mythological lineage and descent ===
The maharajas of Patiala claimed to be direct descendants of Yadu, a mythological Hindu king from whom Bhatti claimed descent. According to Hindu mythology, Yadu was the founder of the mythological Yadu dynasty, a branch of the legendary Lunar dynasty (IAST: Candravaṃśa). The ruling family of Patiala also claimed direct descent from Krishna, who was himself a direct descendant of Yadu according to Hindu tradition.

== List ==
No.	Name (Birth–Death)	Portrait	Reign	Enthronement	Ref.
Rajas
1	Raja Ala Singh (1691 or 1695 – 1765)		1709 – 1765	?	
Raja-e-Rajgans
2	Raja-e Rajgan Amar Singh (7 June 1748 – February 1781)		1765 – 1781	?	
3	Raja-e Rajgan Sahib Singh (18 August 1773 – 26 March 1813)		1781 – 1813	?	
Maharajas
4	Maharaja Karam Singh (12 October 1797 – 23 December 1845)		1813 – 1845	30 June 1813	
5	Maharaja Narinder Singh (26 October 1824 – 13 November 1862)		1845 – 1862	18 January 1846	
6	Maharaja Mahendra Singh (16 September 1852 – 13 or 14 April 1876)		1862 – 1876	29 January 1863	
7	Maharaja Rajinder Singh (25 May 1872 – 8 November 1900)		1876 – 1900	6 January 1877	
8	Maharaja Bhupinder Singh (12 October 1891 – 1938)		1900 – 1938	?	
9	Maharaja Yadavindra Singh (7 January 1913 – 17 June 1974)		1938 – 1974	?	
Pretender
10	Maharaja Amarinder Singh (born 11 March 1942)		1974 – ?	?	
11	Yuvraj Raninder Singh	—	—	—	

== See also ==
- Patiala House Courts Complex, housed in the former palace of the Maharaja
