= Randhir Singh (sports administrator) =

Indian sports administrator and sports shooter (1946–2026)

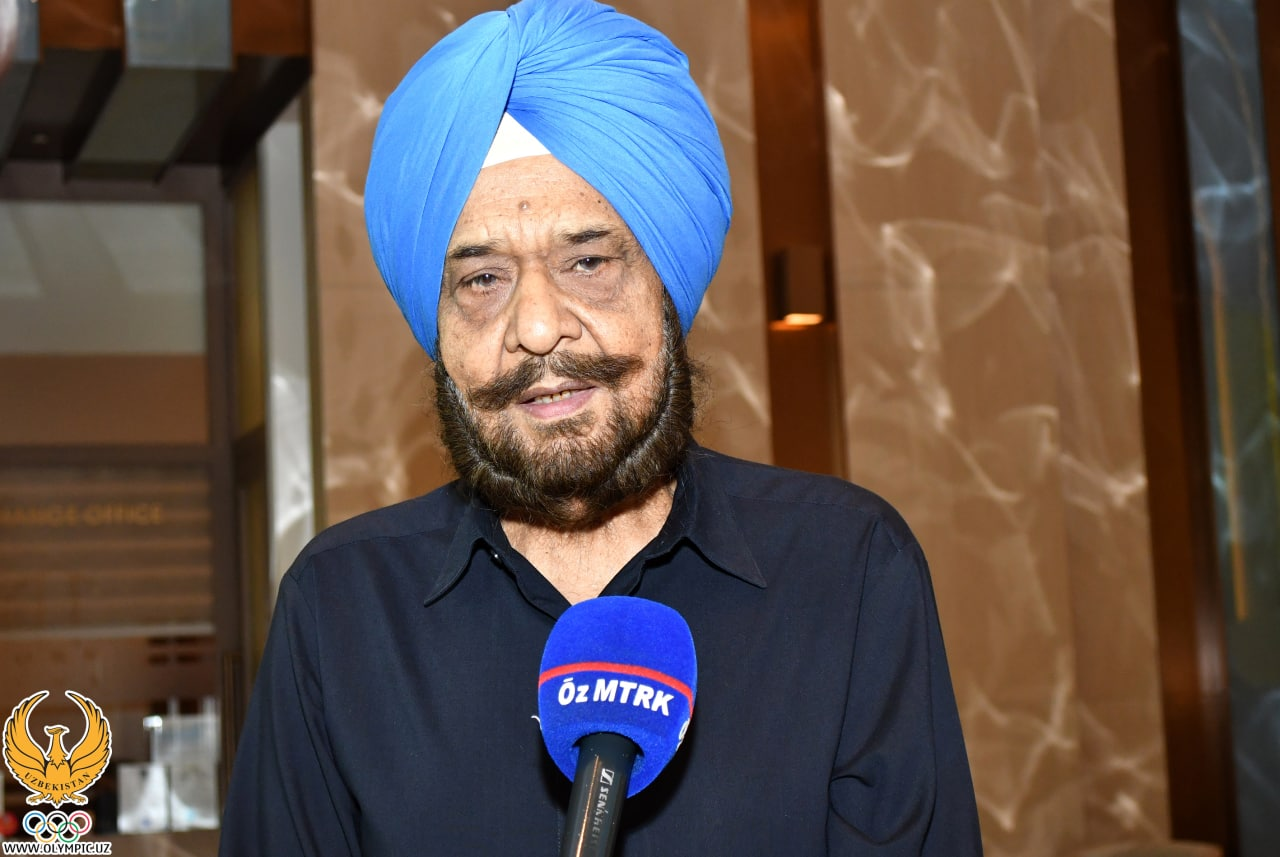
- Singh in 2022

3rd President of the Olympic Council of Asia
- In office 11 September 2021 – 26 January 2026
- Preceded by: Ahmad Al-Fahad Al-Sabah
- Succeeded by: Joaan bin Hamad Al Thani

10th Secretary General of the Indian Olympic Association
- In office 1987–2012
- President: Sivanthi Adithan; Suresh Kalmadi (acting) Vijay Kumar Malhotra
- Preceded by: Roshan Lal Anand
- Succeeded by: Lalit Bhanot

Member of the International Olympic Committee
- In office 2001–2014

Personal details
- Born: 18 October 1946 Patiala, Patiala State, India
- Died: 27 May 2026 (aged 79) New Delhi, India
- Spouse: Vinita Singh
- Children: 3, including Rajeshwari
- Parent: Bhalindra Singh (father)
- Education: Yadvindra Public School; St. Stephen's College (BA)
- Occupation: Sports administrator; sports shooter (retired)

Randhir Singh (18 October 1946 – 27 May 2026) was a five time Indian Olympian and sports administrator. He was a sports shooter. He was a noted sports administrator in India serving as the secretary general of the Indian Olympic Association for 25 years from 1987 to 2012.

Singh held several positions in both Indian and international sports governing bodies, and also had a successful shooting career before retiring from the sport in 1994. He began his sports administration career in 1984.

Singh served as the President of the Olympic Council of Asia (OCA) from September 2024, and was previously the Acting President of the OCA from September 2021. His other roles in international sports administration included being a member of the IOC from 2001 to 2014; then from 2014, he was an honorary member of the IOC. He had also served as the Secretary General of the OCA from 1991 to 2015. In domestic sports administration, his roles have included being the Secretary General of the Indian Olympic Association (IOA) from 1987 to 2012 and a member of the governing board of the Sports Authority of India from 1987 to 2010. Singh's role was crucial in bringing the 2010 Commonwealth Games to Delhi.

He was an Olympic-level trap and skeet shooter. His achievements during his shooting career include competing in five Olympic Games and becoming the first Indian shooter to win a gold medal in the Asian Games, at the 1978 Asian Games. He received the Arjuna Award in 1979 for his achievements in shooting. Singh retired as a sports shooter in 1994.

== Early life and education ==
Randhir Singh was born in Patiala, Patiala State, India on 18 October 1946. He was the son of Bhalindra Singh, a younger son of Maharaja Bhupinder Singh of Patiala. Singh came from a family of influential sports administrators. His father, Bhalindra, was a member of the International Olympic Committee (IOC) from 1947 to 1992, President of the Indian Olympic Association (IOA) from 1960 to 1975 and 1990 to 1984, and was crucial in bringing the 1982 Asian Games to Delhi. Singh's uncle, Yadavindra Singh, the last Maharaja of Patiala, played an important part in lobbying for and then organizing the first Asian Games, held in 1951, in Delhi.

Singh was educated at Yadvindra Public School in Patiala and graduated from St. Stephen's College with a Bachelor of Arts in History. Singh played cricket in school and college as a one-down batsman who also opened the bowling for his school and college teams.

== Shooting career ==
Singh was introduced to shooting by his aunt, who was a national-level shooter. In 1963, while participating in a national competition in India, he shot 25 out of 25 clay pigeons in the first round. Singh made his competitive senior shooting debut as an eighteen-year-old, when he was part of the winning trap shooting team at the Indian National Championships in 1964. The team successfully defended the title in 1965, and Singh won his first national individual title in 1967 in skeet shooting. He went on to win multiple titles at the national level in both skeet and trap shooting.

In his youth, Singh aspired to play cricket for the Indian national cricket team, however, he stopped playing cricket as his shooting career flourished and he started representing India in international shooting competitions. He became the first Indian shooter to win a gold medal in the Asian Games, which he did during the 1978 Asian Games in Bangkok, Thailand. Singh received the Arjuna Award in 1979. During the 1982 Asian Games in Delhi, Singh was part of the Indian team that won a silver medal.

From 1968 to 1984, Singh competed at five Olympic Games in mixed trap. He was the second Indian, after Karni Singh, to compete at five Olympics. His best Olympic performance was 17th at the 1968 Olympics, two points behind Karni Singh and four points from bronze. He has also competed at four Asian Games, winning a medal of each color. His last international competition was the 1994 Asian Games in Hiroshima, Japan. Singh, who had been the Secretary General of the Olympic Council of Asia (OCA) since 1991, became the first person to compete in the Asian Games while being an office bearer in a continental sports organisation.

== Sports administration career ==
Singh began his sports administration career in 1984, when he was elected to the IOA as a joint secretary. He was elected to the IOC during the 112th IOC session in 2001, which was held in Moscow, Russia. In the election, Singh received 101 votes, which was the highest amongst all the candidates. He served as a member of the IOC from 2001 to 2014, and has been an honorary member of the IOC since 2014.

He had served as the Secretary General of the IOA from 1987 to 2012 and was a member of the governing board of the Sports Authority of India from 1987 to 2010. He was also a member of the World Anti-Doping Agency Foundation Board from 2003 to 2005 and was a member of the Executive Board of the Association of National Olympic Committees (ANOC) since 2002.

Singh served on the following commissions: Olympic Games Study from 2002 to 2003, Sport for All from 2004, Women and Sport from 2006, Coordination for the 1st Summer Youth Olympic Games in Singapore in 2010 and the Olympic Truce Foundation from 2007. He was the Founder Secretary General of the Afro-Asian Games Council from 1998 to 2007 and helped lead the organization of the only Afro-Asian Games, which was held in Hyderabad in 2003.

=== 2010 Commonwealth Games ===
Singh was instrumental in bringing the 2010 Commonwealth Games to Delhi and was the Vice Chairman of the Organizing Committee. He was the only senior office bearer of the controversial Organizing Committee who had a clean image. During the planning of the games, Singh and Suresh Kalmadi, President of the IOA at the time, clashed over the planning of the games. Reportedly, the clashes had reached the extent where Manmohan Singh, then-Prime Minister of India, had to be informed by the head of the Commonwealth Games, Mike Fennell.

=== Olympic Council of Asia ===
Singh served as the Secretary General of the OCA from 1991 to 2015 and Life Vice President of the OCA from 2015 to 2021. In 2019, he was appointed by the General Assembly of the OCA as the chairman of the Coordination Committee of the 2022 Asian Games, which was held in Hangzhou, China.

In September 2021, Singh was appointed the Acting President of the OCA. He was appointed the Acting President of the OCA after Sheikh Ahmad Al-Fahad Al-Ahmed Al-Sabah stepped aside as president following a guilty verdict against him by a Geneva Court in a forgery case. In May 2022, after the OCA Executive Board meeting in Tashkent, Uzbekistan, he stated that the 2022 Asian Games will be postponed to 2023 due to the COVID-19 pandemic in China. During his trip to Uzbekistan, Singh met with senior Uzbek politicians, which included Prime Minister of Uzbekistan Abdulla Aripov, at the Palace of International Forums for a celebration to mark the 30th anniversary of ANOC.

In October 2022, Singh in the OCA General Assembly meeting in Phnom Penh, Cambodia, said that the state of the OCA has now normalised post the COVID-19 pandemic. At the 2022 OCA General Assembly, Singh was one of the signatories that signed the contract to host the 2029 Asian Winter Games held in Trojena, NEOM, Saudi Arabia. Also in October 2022, Singh spoke at the OCA's first-ever Gender Equity Seminar in Manama, Bahrain. At the 11th Olympic Summit in December 2022, Singh argued that restrictions on Russian and Belarusian athletes no longer applied in Asia and offered for the OCA to host them in regional events while upholding sanctions stemming from the Russo-Ukrainian war. The IOC later accepted this proposal, allowing both nations’ athletes to compete neutrally in OCA competitions to qualify for the 2024 Paris Olympics, with separate medals and quotas. Despite criticism from Ukraine’s President Volodymyr Zelenskyy, the OCA confirmed their neutral participation in the 2022 Hangzhou Asian Games under the same conditions.

On 8 July 2023, Singh was succeeded by Sheikh Talal Fahad Al Ahmad Al-Sabah, brother of Ahmad Al-Fahad Al-Ahmed Al-Sabah, as President of the OCA, who was elected to the position at the 42nd OCA General Assembly in Bangkok. However, on 30 July 2023, the IOC sent a letter to Singh, in which the IOC asked him to continue as the Acting President of the OCA while they investigated the 2023 OCA presidential election. The IOC alleged that Ahmad Al-Fahad Al-Ahmed Al-Sabah had interfered and tampered with the election, and the IOC had therefore refused to recognise the electoral results.

In September 2023, Singh traveled to Hangzhou for the 2022 Asian Games. On 22 September 2023, he met with Chinese leader and General Secretary of the Chinese Communist Party Xi Jinping, and other members of the Politburo of the Chinese Communist Party which included Cai Qi, Ding Xuexiang, Wang Yi and State councillor Shen Yiqin, one day before the opening of the games. On 8 October 2023, Singh declared the 19th Asian Games closed in the presence of Chinese premier Li Qiang and other dignitaries during the closing ceremony.

In December 2023, the OCA's member NOCs ratified by a two-thirds majority to nullify the OCA presidential elections that took place in July 2023. Singh continued in his position as the Acting President of the OCA until constitutional reforms are implemented and a new elective Congress is held. In May 2024, Singh presided over the 43rd OCA General Assembly in Bangkok.

In July 2024, the OCA's Election Committee unanimously approved the election of Singh as the next President of the OCA. He was nominated by the NOC of India and supported by 27 OCA Member NOCs, as he was the sole eligible candidate nominated for the presidential election at the OCA General Assembly on 8 September 2024. On 8 September 2024, Singh was unanimously elected as the President of the OCA and became the first Indian to become president of the organisation.

== Personal life and death ==
Singh was married to Vinita Singh, the eldest child and only daughter of businessman Vipin Khanna. His first marriage was to Uma Kumari. Singh has 3 daughters; Mahima, Sunaina and Rajeshwari. Sunaina served as one of the vice-presidents of the IOA. Rajeshwari Kumari is an Olympic-level sports shooter and a fashion designer. Rajeshwari is Singh's daughter through his second marriage to Vinita.

Singh's health had gradually declined in his final years, and he was being treated for age-related complications for several days before he died at his residence in New Delhi, on 27 May 2026, at the age of 79.

== Awards ==
- Arjuna Award: 1979
- Maharaja Ranjit Singh Award: 1979
- Merit Award from the OCA: 2005
- Merit Award from the ANOC: 2006
- Olympic Order, Silver: 2014
- Honorary Doctorate of literature from Lakshmibai National Institute of Physical Education, Government of India

== See also ==
- List of athletes with the most appearances at Olympic Games

Preceded by Ahmad Al-Fahad Al-Sabah	President of the OCA; 2021–2026	Succeeded by Joaan bin Hamad Al Thani
