= Om Prakash Mehra =

Indian Air Force officer

Air Chief Marshal O P Mehra PVSM
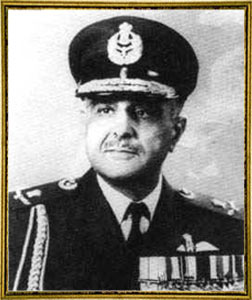
- Air Chief Marshal Om Prakash Mehra

8th Chief of Air Staff
- In office 16 January 1973 – 31 January 1976
- President: V. V. Giri
- Prime Minister: Indira Gandhi
- Preceded by: Pratap Chandra Lal
- Succeeded by: Hrushikesh Moolgavkar

11th Governor of Maharashtra
- In office 3 November 1980 – 5 March 1982
- Chief Minister: A. R. Antulay; Babasaheb Bhosale
- Preceded by: Sri Sadiq Ali
- Succeeded by: Air Chief Marshal I H Latif

6th Governor of Rajasthan
- In office 6 March 1982 – 4 January 1985
- Preceded by: K. D. Sharma
- Succeeded by: Vasantrao Patil

5th President of Indian Olympic Association
- In office 1975–1980
- Preceded by: Bhalindra Singh
- Succeeded by: Bhalindra Singh

Personal details
- Born: 19 January 1919 Lahore, British India (now in Lahore, Pakistan)
- Died: 8 November 2015 (aged 96) New Delhi, India
- Education: Sacred Heart Convent; Central Model School; Government College University; Punjab University
- Awards: Padma Vibhushan; Param Vishist Seva Medal (PVSM)

Military service
- Allegiance: British India (1940–1947); India (from 1947)
- Branch/service: Royal Indian Air Force; Indian Air Force
- Years of service: 1940-1976
- Rank: Air Chief Marshal
- Commands: Maintenance Command; No. 3 Squadron IAF
- Battles/wars: World War II; Indo-Pakistani War (1965)

Air Chief Marshal Om Prakash Mehra, PVSM (19 January 1919 – 8 November 2015) was a former air officer in the Indian Air Force. He served as the Chief of the Air Staff from 1973 to 1976. He received Param Vishisht Seva Medal (PVSM), the highest military award for peace-time service, in 1968. He was awarded Padma Vibhushan, India's second highest civilian honour, in 1977. He later became Governor of Maharashtra from 1980 to 1982, and Governor of Rajasthan from 1985 to 1987. He married Satya Mehra and has four children with her Sunil, Parveen, Rahul, and Amitava and numerous grand children.

== Early life ==
Mehra was born on 19 January 1918 at Lahore. His basic education was at the Sacred Heart Convent. He finished school at the Central Model School in 1933 and joined Government College University, Lahore and completed a master's degree in history from the Punjab University in 1940.

== Career ==
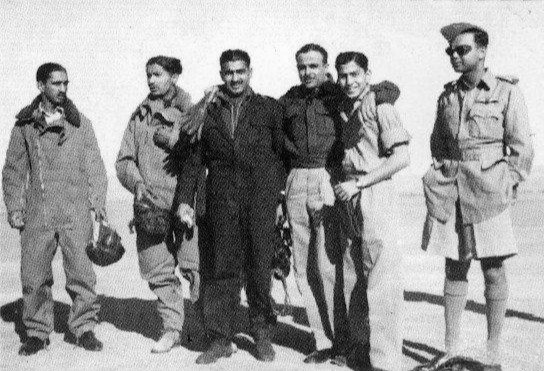
From left: Nur Khan, Asghar Khan, Abdur Rahim Khan, OP Mehra, Minoo Merwan Engineer, and an unidentified officer, 1944

After a short spell of flying at the Northern India Flying Club, Lahore, he was selected for the Indian Air Force and joined the services as a Pilot Officer on 30 November 1940. On completion of his training, he was posted to No.1 Squadron in August 1941. In March 1946 Mehra was selected to serve as the Indian Air force representative at the Joint Chiefs of Staff in Australia, an organization set up to provide administrative and logistics support to the British Commonwealth Occupation Forces located in Japan. In view of the nationalization of the armed forces, he was recalled and posted in February 1947 as the Chief Ground Instructor at the No.1 Advanced Flying School Ambala, to replace the RAF officer who was returning home.

=== Post-Independence ===
In August 1947, he was promoted to the rank of Wing Commander and posted as Commandant of the Elementary Flying Training School at Jodhpur. On promotion to the rank of Air Vice Marshal in August 1963, he took over as Air Officer Commanding-in-Chief Maintenance Command, in which capacity he served during the 1965 War. On 26 January 1968, he was awarded the Param Vishisht Seva Medal, and promoted to Air Marshal in March 1968. Soon thereafter he was posted as Deputy Chief of Air Staff, Air Headquarters. In early 1971, he was deputed as Chairman of Hindustan Aeronautics Limited, Bangalore. On 15 January 1973, he returned to Air Headquarters, designated as the new Chief of Air Staff, succeeding Air Chief Marshal PC Lal. He credited his success to Sathya Sai Baba and became his avowed devotee. (http://www.vedamu.org/features/FMrOPMehra.aspx)

Mehra relinquished the post to Air Chief Marshal Hrushikesh Moolgavkar on 31 January 1976, on completion of his tenure.

== Post-Air force career ==
After his retirement, he represented India at a UNESCO meeting in Paris as deputy leader of India's team. He was the recipient of Padma Vibhushan in January 1977. He went on to serve as the governor of Maharashtra from 3 November 1980 to 5 March 1982. This was followed by his posting as Governor of Rajasthan from 6 March 1982 to 4 November 1985.

Air Chief Marshal Mehra was elected president of the Indian Olympic Association in 1975, and was responsible for the hosting by India of the 1982 Asian Games. From 1978 to 1980 he was President of the Asian Games Federation, currently known as the Olympic Council of Asia, and continued to be the Honorary Life President of the Olympic Council of Asia. He was an honorary life member of the Durand Football Tournament Society, which organizes the Durand Cup.

In January, 2010, his autobiography, Memories: Sweet and Sour, was released by M. Hamid Ansari, Vice President of India in New Delhi. He was chairman, Board of Advisors of Centre for Air Power Studies.

In 2012, he was living in Delhi, and was the oldest living student of Panjab University, Chandigarh. He died on 8 November 2015 at the age of 96.

== Works ==
- Memories Sweet And Sour by Air Chief Marshal OP Mehra. KW Publisher, 2010. ISBN 9380502095.

Military offices
| Preceded by Harjinder Singh | Air Officer Commanding-in-Chief Maintenance Command; 1963–1967 | Succeeded by H. N. Chatterjee |
| Preceded by Minoo Merwan Engineer | Deputy Chief of the Air Staff (India); 1969–1971 | Succeeded by Hirendra Nath Chatterjee |
| Preceded by Pratap Chandra Lal | Chief of the Air Staff; 1973–1976 | Succeeded by Hrushikesh Moolgavkar |
Civic offices
| Preceded by Bhalindra Singh | President of the Indian Olympic Association; 1975–1980 | Succeeded by Bhalindra Singh |
Government offices
| Preceded by Sadiq Ali | Governor of Maharashtra; 1980–1982 | Succeeded by Idris Hasan Latif |
| Preceded by K. D. Sharma (acting) | Governor of Rajasthan; 1982–1985 | Succeeded by Vasantdada Patil |
