= Olympic Council of Asia =

Governing body of sports in Asia

Coordinates: 29°20′55.0″N 48°05′23.3″E

- Formation: 16 November 1982
- Type: Sports federation
- Headquarters: Kuwait City, Kuwait
- Members: 45 National Olympic Committees
- Official language: English
- President: (Qatar) Joaan bin Hamad Al Thani
- Website: oca.asia
- Anthem: OCA Anthem (short version with one stanza; in use since 2013); Motto: Ever Onward

The Olympic Council of Asia (OCA) is an international organization which represents the current 45 National Olympic Committees of Asia.

It is affiliated with the International Olympic Committee and its affiliated bodies, including the Association of National Olympic Committees, and serves as the continental association of Asia.

The organization's flagship event is the quadrennial Asian Games, held since 1951.

== History ==
In 1948, during the 1948 Summer Olympics, Asian National Olympic Committees (NOCs) decided to organize the Asian Games, under the auspices of Asian Games Federation. The following year the Asian Games Federation was organized. Decades later this would be reorganized and the Olympic Council of Asia (OCA) was established in New Delhi on 16 November 1982. The International Olympic Committee (IOC) recognized the OCA within the same year.

On 9 December 1996, during the 15th General Assembly in Bangkok, the Olympic Council of Asia unveiled its official anthem, a composition that blends sounds from various cultures across the Asian continent. This song symbolises cooperation and unity among Asian nations in the sporting world, reflecting an effort to strengthen ties and promote the Olympic spirit in the region.

The OCA together with the Asian Electronic Sports Federation (AESF) announced a new campaign for the upcoming 2022 Asian Games. The campaign, ‘Road to Asian Games’ will be officially organized by the AESF and aims to bring the Olympic spirit to eSports and introduce an education program for participating eSports athletes.

On 8 July 2023, Talal Fahad Al-Ahmad Al-Sabah was elected as President of the OCA. However, the IOC refused to recognize the election, and on 30 July 2023, the IOC, in a letter, asked Randhir Singh, who was at the time the Acting President of the OCA, to continue as acting president while the IOC investigated the 2023 OCA presidential election. In July 2024, Singh was elected as the next President of the OCA, and the election, where he was the sole candidate, was unanimously approved by the Election Committee. Singh's presidential election is set to take place at the OCA General Assembly on 8 September 2024.

== Member nations ==
In the following table, the year in which the NOC was recognized by the International Olympic Committee (IOC) is also given if it is different from the year in which the NOC was created. The NOC for Macau is recognized by the OCA, but is not recognized by the IOC and does not compete in the Olympic Games. The OCA also includes the NOCs of Taiwan, Hong Kong, and Palestine. Timor-Leste is the newest member, joining in 2003.

Nation	Code	National Olympic Committee	President	Created	OCA Member	IOC member	Ref.
West Asia Zone
Bahrain	BRN	Bahrain Olympic Committee	Sheikh Khalid bin Hamad Al Khalifa	1978	1982	Yes	
Iraq	IRQ	National Olympic Committee of Iraq	Aqeel Moften	1948	1982	Yes	
Jordan	JOR	Jordan Olympic Committee	Prince Faisal bin Al Hussein	1957	1982	Yes	
Kuwait	KUW	Kuwait Olympic Committee	Sheikh Fahad Nasser Sabah Al-Ahmed Al-Sabah	1957	1982	Yes	
Lebanon	LBN	Lebanese Olympic Committee	Jean Hammam	1947	1982	Yes	
Oman	OMA	Oman Olympic Committee	Sheikh Khalid bin Mohammed Al Zubair	1982		Yes	
Palestine	PLE	Palestine Olympic Committee	Jibril Rajoub	1931	1995	Yes	
Qatar	QAT	Qatar Olympic Committee	Joaan bin Hamad	1979	1982	Yes	
Saudi Arabia	KSA	Saudi Arabian Olympic Committee	Abdulaziz bin Turki Al Saud	1964	1982	Yes	
Syria	SYR	Syrian Olympic Committee	Feras Mouala	1948	1982	Yes	
United Arab Emirates	UAE	United Arab Emirates National Olympic Committee	Sheikh Ahmed bin Mohammed bin Rashid Al Maktoum	1979	1982	Yes	
Yemen	YEM	Yemen Olympic Committee	Abdulrahman Alakwaa	1971	1982	Yes	
Central Asia Zone
Afghanistan	AFG	National Olympic Committee of the Islamic Republic of Afghanistan	Hafizullah Wali Rahimi	1935	1982	Yes	
Iran	IRI	National Olympic Committee of the Islamic Republic of Iran	Mahmoud Khosravivafa	1947	1982	Yes	
Kazakhstan	KAZ	National Olympic Committee of the Republic of Kazakhstan	Timur Kulibayev	1990	1993	Yes	
Kyrgyzstan	KGZ	National Olympic Committee of the Kyrgyz Republic	Sadyr Mamytov	1991	1993	Yes	
Tajikistan	TJK	National Olympic Committee of the Republic of Tajikistan	Emomalii Rahmon	1992	1993	Yes	
Turkmenistan	TKM	National Olympic Committee of Turkmenistan	Gurbanguly Berdimuhamedow	1990	1993	Yes	
Uzbekistan	UZB	National Olympic Committee of the Republic of Uzbekistan	Umid Akhmatdjanov	1992	1993	Yes	
South Asia Zone
Bangladesh	BAN	Bangladesh Olympic Association	Abu Belal Muhammad Shafiul Huq	1979	1982	Yes	
Bhutan	BHU	Bhutan Olympic Committee	Prince Dasho Jigyel Ugyen Wangchuck	1983		Yes	
India	IND	Indian Olympic Association	P. T. Usha	1927	1982	Yes	
Maldives	MDV	Maldives Olympic Committee	Mohamed Shaweed	1985		Yes	
Nepal	NEP	Nepal Olympic Committee	Jeevan Ram Shrestha	1962	1982	Yes	
Pakistan	PAK	Pakistan Olympic Association	Syed Arif Hasan	1948	1982	Yes	
Sri Lanka	SRI	National Olympic Committee of Sri Lanka	Suresh Subramaniam	1937	1982	Yes	
East Asia Zone
China	CHN	Chinese Olympic Committee	Gao Zhidan	1910	1982	Yes	
North Korea	PRK	Olympic Committee of the Democratic People's Republic of Korea	Kim Il-guk	1953	1982	Yes	
Hong Kong	HKG	Sports Federation and Olympic Committee of Hong Kong, China	Timothy Fok	1950	1982	Yes	
Japan	JPN	Japanese Olympic Committee	Seiko Hashimoto	1911	1982	Yes	
South Korea	KOR	Korean Sport & Olympic Committee	Ryu Seung-min	1946	1982	Yes	
Macau	MAC	Sports and Olympic Committee of Macau, China	Lo Keng Siu	1989		No	
Mongolia	MGL	Mongolian National Olympic Committee	Battushig Batbold	1956	1982	Yes	
Chinese Taipei	TPE	Chinese Taipei Olympic Committee	Hong-dow Lin	1960	1982	Yes	
Southeast Asia Zone
Brunei	BRU	Brunei Darussalam National Olympic Council	Prince Haji Sufri Bolkiah	1984		Yes	
Cambodia	CAM	National Olympic Committee of Cambodia	Thong Khon	1983	1994	Yes	
Indonesia	INA	Indonesian Olympic Committee	Raja Sapta Oktohari	1946	1982	Yes	
Laos	LAO	National Olympic Committee of Laos	Phouthone Seung-Akhom	1975	1982	Yes	
Malaysia	MAS	Olympic Council of Malaysia	Mohamad Norza Zakaria	1953	1982	Yes	
Myanmar	MYA	Myanmar Olympic Committee	Thet Khaing Win (Minister for the Ministry of Health and Sports)	1947	1982	Yes	
Philippines	PHI	Philippine Olympic Committee (Note: From 1911 to 1975, Philippines was represented by the Philippine Amateur Athletic Federation (PAAF). In 1975, the Philippine Olympic Committee was established and replaced the PAAF.)	Abraham Tolentino	1911	1982	Yes	
Singapore	SGP	Singapore National Olympic Council	Jessie Phua (acting)	1947	1982	Yes	
Thailand	THA	National Olympic Committee of Thailand	Pimol Srivikorn	1948	1982	Yes	
Timor-Leste	TLS	National Olympic Committee of Timor Leste	Francisco Kalbuadi Lay	2003		Yes	
Vietnam	VIE	Vietnam Olympic Committee	Nguyễn Văn Hùng	1952	1982	Yes	

The OCA includes the transcontinental country of Kazakhstan, but does not include Armenia, Azerbaijan, Cyprus, Georgia, Turkey, and Russia, although they are located wholly or mostly in Asia. Israel, however, was excluded after the Munich Massacre, upon the claim that their delegation security at the Asian Games would be a problem. The South Caucasian countries opted to join the European Olympic Committees after the dissolution of the Soviet Union.

=== Former members ===
Nation	Code	National Olympic Committee	President	Created	OCA Member	IOC member	Ref.
Israel	ISR	Olympic Committee of Israel	Yael Arad	1933	1952	Yes	

Israel was a member of the Asian Games Federation, but was excluded from the Olympic Council of Asia upon its re-incorporation in 1981. Since 1994, Israel is a member of the European Olympic Committees (EOC) instead.

=== OCA regional zones ===
==== OCA Zone 1 (West Asia) ====
- Bahrain
- Iraq
- Jordan
- Kuwait
- Lebanon
- Oman
- Palestine
- Qatar
- Saudi Arabia
- Syria
- United Arab Emirates
- Yemen

==== OCA Zone 2 (Central Asia) ====
- Afghanistan
- Iran
- Kazakhstan
- Kyrgyzstan
- Tajikistan
- Turkmenistan
- Uzbekistan

==== OCA Zone 3 (South Asia) ====
- Bangladesh
- Bhutan
- India
- Maldives
- Nepal
- Pakistan
- Sri Lanka

==== OCA Zone 4 (East Asia) ====
- China
- Hong Kong, China
- Macau, China
- Japan
- North Korea
- South Korea
- Chinese Taipei
- Mongolia

==== OCA Zone 5 (Southeast Asia) ====
- Brunei
- Cambodia
- Indonesia
- Laos
- Malaysia
- Myanmar
- Philippines
- Singapore
- Thailand
- Timor-Leste
- Vietnam

== Administration ==
=== List of presidents ===
No.	Name	NOC	Term	Duration
1	Fahad Al-Ahmed Al-Jaber Al-Sabah	Kuwait	16 November 1982 – 2 August 1990	7 years, 260 days
Acting	Roy de Silva	Sri Lanka	2 August 1990 – 1 July 1991	334 days
2	Ahmad Al-Fahad Al-Ahmed Al-Sabah	Kuwait	1 July 1991 – 10 September 2021	30 years, 73 days
3	Randhir Singh	India	11 September 2021 – 26 January 2026	4 years, 138 days
4	Joaan bin Hamad Al Thani	Qatar	26 January 2026 – present	293 days

=== Executive board ===
Designation	Name	NOC	Entry	Note
President	Joaan bin Hamad bin Khalifa Al Thani	Qatar	1990	Coordination Committee
Honorary Life Vice-presidents	Randhir Singh	India	1990	Coordination Committee
Honorary Life Vice-presidents	Wei Jizhong	China	1991	Ethics Committee
Vice-presidents	Hidehiko Yoshida	Japan	2023	Leading Vice-president
Vice-presidents	Charouck Arirachakaran	Thailand	2023	Southeast Asia
Vice-presidents	Timothy Fok	Hong Kong	1999	East Asia
Vice-presidents	Tsunekazu Takeda	Japan	1999	2026 Asian Games
Vice-presidents	Syed Arif Hasan	Pakistan	2007	South Asia
Vice-presidents	Yu Zaiqing	China	2015	ANOC
Vice-presidents	Song Luzeng	China	2015	2020 Asian Beach Games and 2022 Asian Games
Vice-presidents	Timur Kulibayev	Kazakhstan	2016	Central Asia
Vice-presidents	Thani Abdulrahman Al Kuwari	Qatar	2019	West Asia
Vice-presidents	Dato Seri Chaiyapak Siriwat	Thailand	2020	6th AIMAG Bangkok
Vice-presidents	Otabek Umarov	Uzbekistan	2020	4th AYG Tashkent
Vice-presidents	Chey Tae-won	South Korea	2020	IF/AF Liaison
Vice-presidents	Jassim Rashid Al Buenain	Qatar	2021	2030 Asian Games
Vice-presidents	Abdulaziz Bin Turki Al-Faisal Al Saud	Saudi Arabia	2021	2034 Asian Games
Vice-presidents	Gordon Tang	Cambodia	2021	2029 AYG Cambodia
Honorary Vice-presidents	Hemasiri Fernando	Sri Lanka	2003	
Honorary Vice-presidents	Rita Sri Wahyusih Subowo	Indonesia	2015	
Honorary Members	Natalya Sipovich	Kazakhstan	2007	
Honorary Members	Hoàng Vĩnh Giang	Vietnam	2007	
Honorary Members	Souhail Khoury	Lebanon	2007	
Honorary Members	Moon Dae-sung	South Korea	2011	
Honorary Members	Jefri Bolkiah	Brunei	2015	
Honorary Members	Raad Hammoudi Salman al-Dulaimi	Iraq	2015	
Honorary Members	Rustam Emomali	Tajikistan	2019	
Honorary Members	Taha Al Kishry	Oman	2019	
Honorary Members	Ajmal Ghani	Afghanistan	2019	
Honorary Members	Seyed Reza Salehi Amiri	Iran	2019	
Director General & Technical Director	Husain Al-Musallam	Kuwait	1982	Director General & Technical Director
Director General & Technical Director	Vinod Kumar Tiwari	India	2015	Deputy Director General

=== Standing Committee-Chair ===
Committee	Chairperson	NOC
OCA Rules Committee	Talal Fahad Ahmed Al-Sabah	Kuwait
OCA Advisory Committee	Ng Ser Miang	Singapore
OCA Peace Through Sport Committee	Faisal bin Hussein	Jordan
OCA Athletes Committee	Mikako Kotani	Japan
OCA Sports Environment Committee	Yu Kyung-sun	South Korea
OCA Medical Committee	Sultan Ya'rub Qahtan Al Busaidi	Oman
OCA Sports for All Committee	Mowaffak Joumaa	Syria
OCA Media Committee	Charles King Chiu Lo	Macau, China
OCA Finance Committee	Kevin Kuo-I Chen	Chinese Taipei
OCA Culture Committee	Khunying Patama Leeswadtrakul	Thailand
OCA Entourage Committee	Seung Min Ryu	South Korea
OCA Education Committee	Abdullah bin Musa'ed bin Abdulaziz Al Saud	Saudi Arabia
OCA Coordination Committee	Randhir Singh	India
OCA Ethics Committee	Jizhong Wei	China
OCA Information and Statistics Committee	Demchigjav Zagdsuren	Mongolia
OCA International Relations Committee	Jigyel Ugyen Wangchuck	Bhutan
OCA Sports Committee	Song Luzeng	China
OCA Gender Equity Committee	Hayat Abdulaziz Al-Khalifa	Bahrain

=== Honorary Life Members ===
Designation	Name	Country
Honorary Life President	HH Maharadhiraj Yadavindra Singh	India
Honorary Life President	Jorge B. Vargas	Philippines
Honorary Life President	Sultan Hamengkubuwono IX	Indonesia
Honorary Life President	Praphas Charusathien	Thailand
Honorary Life President	Chang Key-yong	South Korea
Honorary Life President	Air Chief Marshal Dawee Chullasapya	Thailand
Honorary Life President	Malik Meraj Khalid	Pakistan
Honorary Life President	Raja Bhalindra Singh	India
Honorary Life President	Sheikh Fahad Al-Ahmed Al-Jaber Al-Sabah	Kuwait
Honorary Life President	Ryotaro Azuma	Japan
Honorary Life President	Prince Gholamreza Pahlavi	Iran
Honorary Life Vice-president	Chang Feng-hsu	Chinese Taipei
Honorary Life Vice-president	Arnaldo de Oliveira Sales	Hong Kong, China
Honorary Life Vice-president	Yoshio Kuroda	Japan

== OCA General Assembly (GA) ==
In General Assembly (GA) (OCA Annual General Assembly) hosts of various competitions are introduced and important decisions are made about the countries and sports that covered by OCA.

1. 1st: 1982 in New Delhi, India.
2. 2nd: 1983 in, .
3. 3rd: 1984 in Seoul, South Korea.
4. 4th: 1985 in, .
5. 5th: 1986 in, .
6. 6th: 1987 in, .
7. 7th: 1988 in, .
8. 8th: 1989 in, .
9. 9th: 1990 in Beijing, China.
10. 10th: 1991 in, .
11. 11th: 1992 in, .
12. 12th: 1993 in, .
13. 13th: 1994 in, .
14. 14th: 23 May 1995 in Seoul, South Korea.
15. 15th: 1996 in Bangkok, Thailand.
16. 16th: 1997 in, .
17. 17th: 1998 in, .
18. 18th: 1999 in Kuwait City, Kuwait.
19. 19th: 12 November 2000 in Busan, South Korea.
20. 20th: 2001 in Aomori, Japan.
21. 21st: 2002 in Busan, South Korea.
22. 22nd: 24 Jan 2003 in Kuwait City, Kuwait.
23. 23rd: 2004 in Doha, Qatar.
24. 24th: 2005 in Guangzhou, China.
25. 25th: 2006 in Doha, Qatar.
26. 26th: 16 April 2007 in Kuwait City, Kuwait.
27. 27th: 2008 in Bali, Indonesia.
28. 28th: 3 July 2009 in Singapore.
29. 29th: 2010 in Guangzhou, China.
30. 30th: 2011 in Tokyo, Japan.
31. 31st: 2012 in Macau. On 8 November 2012, the OCA decided at its 31st General Assembly in Macau to create a special multi-sport event called Asian Games Centennial Festival.
32. 32nd: 18 January 2013 in Manila, Philippines. (After 64th OCA Executive Board meeting)
33. 33rd: 2014 in Songdo, South Korea.
34. 34th: 16 September 2015 in Ashgabat, Turkmenistan.
35. 35th: 25 September 2016 in Danang, Vietnam.
36. 36th: 21 September 2017 in Ashgabat, Turkmenistan.
37. 37th: 19 August 2018 in Jakarta, Indonesia.
38. 38th: 3 March 2019 in Bangkok, Thailand.
39. 39th: 16 December 2020 in Muscat, Oman.
40. 40th: 21 November 2021 in Dubai, United Arab Emirates.
41. 41st: 4 October 2022 in Phnom Penh, Cambodia.
42. 42nd: 8 July 2023 in Bangkok, Thailand.
43. 43rd: Feb 2024 in Bangkok, Thailand.
44. 44th: 8 September 2024 in New Delhi, India.
45. 45th: 12 May 2025 in Kuwait City, Kuwait
46. 46th: 26 January 2026 Tashkent, Uzbekistan
47. 47th: 27 January 2027 Doha, Qatar

== OCA Executive Board Meeting (EBM) ==
64th : January 2013 in Manila, Philippines.

== OCA Recognized Sports ==
90 Sports on 1 January 2024. The OCA provides recognition in order for a sport to grow and develop.

1. Air sports – Airsport Federation of Asia (AFA)
2. Aquatic sports – Asia Swimming Federation (ASF)
3. Archery – Asian Archery Federation (AAF)
4. Athletics – Asian Athletics Association (AAA)
5. Badminton – Badminton Asia (BA)
6. Baseball – Baseball Federation of Asia (BFA)
7. Basketball – FIBA Asia (FIBA)
8. Biathlon – International Biathlon Union (IBU)
9. Billiards Sports – Asian Confederation of Billiards Sports (ACBS)
10. Bobsleigh – International Bobsleigh and Tobogganing (FIBT)
11. Bodybuilding – Asian Federation of Bodybuilding & Fitness (AFBF)
12. Bowling – Asian Bowling Federation (ABF)
13. Boxing – Asian Boxing Confederation (ASBC)
14. Bridge – Pacific Asia Bridge Federation (PABF)
15. Canoeing – Asian Canoe Confederation (ACC)
16. Chess – Asian Chess Federation (ACF)
17. Chinlone – Asian Chinlone Federation (ACF)
18. Cricket – Asian Cricket Council (ACC)
19. Curling – World Curling Federation (WCF)
20. Cycling – Asian Cycling Confederation (ACC)
21. Dance Sports – Dance Sport Asia (DSA)
22. Dragon & Lion Dance – Dragon & Lion Dances Federation of Asia (DLFA)
23. Dragon Boat – Asian Dragon Boat Federation (ADBF)
24. Electronic Sports – Asian Electronic Sports Federation (AESF)
25. Equestrian Sports – Asian Equestrian Federation (AEF)
26. Extreme Sports – Asian Extreme Sports Federation (AXC)
27. Fencing – Fencing Confederation of Asia (FCA)
28. Finswimming – Asia Underwater Federation (AUF)
29. Flag Football – International Federation of American Football (IFAF)
30. Floorball – International Floorball Federation (AFF)
31. Football – Asian Football Confederation (AFC)
32. Footvolley – Asian Footvolley Federation (AFF)
33. Golf – Asian Pacific Golf Confederation (APGC)
34. Gymnastics – Asian Gymnastics Union (AGU)
35. Handball – Asian Handball Federation (AHF)
36. Hockey – Asian Hockey Federation (AHF)
37. Ice Hockey – Asian Ice Hockey Federation (AIHF)
38. Ju-Jitsu – Ju-Jitsu Asian Union (JJAU)
39. Judo – Judo Union of Asia (JUA)
40. Kabaddi – Asian Kabaddi Federation (AKF)
41. Karate – Asian Karatedo Federation (AKF)
42. Kickboxing – Asian Kickboxing Confederation (WAKO Asia)
43. Korfball – International Korfball Federation (IKF)
44. Kurash – Kurash Confederation of Asia (KCA)
45. Lawn Bowls – World Bowls (WB)
46. Life Saving – International Life Saving Federation (ILSF)
47. Luge – International Luge Federation (ILF)
48. Modern Pentathlon – Asian Modern Pentathlon Confederation (AMPC)
49. Motor Sports – Union Internationale Motonautique (UIM)
50. Muay – Federation of Asian Muaythai Associations (FAMA)
51. Netball – International Federation of Netball Associations (World Netball)
52. Pencak Silat – Asian Pencak Silat Federation (APSF)
53. Petanque – Asian Petanque and Sports Boules Confederation (APSBC)
54. Polo – Federation of International Polo (FIP)
55. Power Boating – Union Internationale Motonautique (UIM)
56. Racquetball – Asia Racquetball Federation (ARF)
57. Roller Sports – World Skate Asia (WSA)
58. Rowing – Asian Rowing Federation (ARF)
59. Rugby – Asia Rugby (AR)
60. Sailing – Asian Sailing Federation (ASAF)
61. Sambo – SAMBO Union of Asia and Oceania (SUAO)
62. Sepaktakraw – Asian Sepaktakraw Federation (ASF)
63. Shooting – Asian Shooting Confederation (ASC)
64. Shuttle Cock – International Shuttlecock Federation (ISF)
65. Skating – Asian Skating Union (ASU)
66. Skiing – Asian Ski Federation (ASF)
67. Soft Tennis – Asian Soft Tennis Federation (ASFF)
68. Softball – Softball Asia (SA)
69. Sports Climbing – International Federation of Sport Climbing - Asia (IFSC Asia)
70. Squash – Asian Squash Federation (ASF)
71. Sumo – Asian Sumo Federation (ASF)
72. Surfing – International Surfing Association (ISA)
73. Table Tennis – Asian Table Tennis Union (ATTU)
74. Taekwondo – World Taekwondo Asia (WTA)
75. Tennis – Asian Tennis Federation (ATF)
76. Teqball – Fédération Internationale de Teqball (FITEQ)
77. Traditional Boat Race – International Dragon Boat Federation (IDBF)
78. Traditional Wrestling – United World Wrestling (UWW)
79. Triathlon – World Triathlon -Asia (ASTC)
80. Vocotruyen – World Federation of Vietnam Vocotruyen (WFVV)
81. Volleyball – Asian Volleyball Confederation (AVC)
82. Vovinam – Asian Vovinam Federation (AVF)
83. Waterski – Asian Waterski & Wakeboard Confederation (IWWF Asia)
84. Weightlifting – Asian Weightlifting Federation (AWF)
85. Woodball – Asian Woodball Federation (AWBF)
86. Wrestling – United World Wrestling Asia (UWW Asia)
87. Wushu – Wushu Federation of Asia (WFA)
88. Yachting – Asian Yachting Federation (AYF)

2 New sports was added in 2023:

1. Dodgeball – Asian Dodgeball Federation (ADF)
2. Jump Rope – Asian Jump Rope Union (AJRU)

=== 2026 Asian Games program ===
2026 Asian Games sports:

42 Sports consist of 32 sports from the Paris 2024 Olympic Games (Surfing: New sport in Asian Games) + 9 other sports. One from each of the five OCA Zones: [Wushu (East Asia), Sepak takraw (Southeast Asia), Kabaddi (South Asia), Kurash (Central Asia), Jujitsu (West Asia) and 7 Sports from AINAGOC (Aichi-Nagoya Asian Games Organising Committee) and the Olympic Council of Asia: Baseball/Softball, Cricket, Karate, Esports, Squash, Dancesport (Breakdance, Virtual), Tenpin bowling and proposed: Powerlifting.

== Events ==
- Asian Games
- Asian Winter Games
- Asian Beach Games
- Asian Youth Games
- Asian Indoor and Martial Arts Games
- Asian Esports and Mind Sports Games

Related Events:

- Far Eastern Championship Games - Western Asiatic Games
- FESPIC Games - Asian Para Games

Competition	Edition	Top rank	Title	Runners-up	Most successful	Next edition
Asian Games	Aichi-Nagoya 2026	China	12th	Japan	China (12)	Doha 2030
Asian Winter Games	Harbin 2025	China	4th	South Korea	China Japan (4)	Almaty 2029
Asian Beach Games	Sanya 2026	China	6th	Thailand	China (2)	Cebu City 2028
Asian Indoor and Martial Arts Games	Ashgabat 2017	Turkmenistan	1st	China	China (4)	Riyadh 2026
Asian Youth Games	Bahrain 2025	China	3rd	Uzbekistan	China (3)	Tashkent 2029
Asian Esports & Mind Sports Games	Kuwait 2027					

== Events Summary ==
#	Games	Host	Nations	Competitors	Sports	Events	Champion
1	1951 Asian Games (1)	India	11	489	6	57	Japan
2	1954 Asian Games (2)	Philippines	18	970	8	76	Japan
3	1958 Asian Games (3)	Japan	16	1,820	13	97	Japan
4	1962 Asian Games (4)	Indonesia	12	1,460	13	88	Japan
5	1966 Asian Games (5)	Thailand	16	1,945	14	143	Japan
6	1970 Asian Games (6)	Thailand	16	2,400	13	135	Japan
7	1974 Asian Games (7)	Iran	19	3,010	16	202	Japan
8	1978 Asian Games (8)	Thailand	19	3,842	19	201	Japan
9	1982 Asian Games (9)	India	23	3,411	21	147	China
10	1986 Asian Winter Games (1)	Japan	7	293	7	35	Japan
11	1986 Asian Games (10)	South Korea	22	4,839	25	270	China
12	1990 Asian Winter Games (2)	Japan	9	310	6	33	Japan
13	1990 Asian Games (11)	China	36	6,122	27	310	China
14	1994 Asian Games (12)	Japan	42	6,828	34	338	China
15	1996 Asian Winter Games (3)	China	17	453	8	43	China
16	1998 Asian Games (13)	Thailand	41	6,554	36	377	China
17	1999 Asian Winter Games (4)	South Korea	14	798	7	43	China
18	2002 Asian Games (14)	South Korea	44	7,711	38	419	China
19	2003 Asian Winter Games (5)	Japan	17	641	11	51	Japan
20	2005 Asian Indoor Games (1)	Thailand	45	2,343	9	120	China
21	2006 Asian Games (15)	Qatar	45	9,520	39	424	China
22	2007 Asian Winter Games (6)	China	25	796	10	47	China
23	2007 Asian Indoor Games (2)	Macau	44	2,476	17	171	China
24	2008 Asian Beach Games (1)	Indonesia	41	1,665	17	59	Indonesia
25	2009 Asian Youth Games (1)	Singapore	43	1,237	9	90	China
26	2009 Asian Martial Arts Games (1)(-)	Thailand	40	810	9	109	Thailand
27	2009 Asian Indoor Games (3)	Vietnam	43	2,396	15	242	China
28	2010 Asian Games (16)	China	45	9,704	42	476	China
29	2010 Asian Beach Games (2)	Oman	43	1,131	14	52	Thailand
30	2011 Asian Winter Games (7)	Kazakhstan	26	843	11	69	Kazakhstan
31	2012 Asian Beach Games (3)	China	43	1,336	13	49	China
32	2013 Asian Indoor and Martial Arts Games (4)	South Korea	43	1,652	12	100	China
33	2013 Asian Youth Games (2)	China	45	2,404	16	122	China
34	2014 Asian Games (17)	South Korea	45	9,501	37	439	China
35	2014 Asian Beach Games (4)	Thailand	42	2,335	26	168	Thailand
36	2016 Asian Beach Games (5)	Vietnam	41	2,197	14	172	Vietnam
37	2017 Asian Winter Games (8)	Japan	32	1,147	11	64	Japan
38	2017 Asian Indoor and Martial Arts Games (5)	Turkmenistan	63	4,012	21	341	Turkmenistan
39	2018 Asian Games (18)	Indonesia	45	11,300	46	465	China
40	2022 Asian Games (19)	China	45	12,000	40	481	China
41	2025 Asian Winter Games (9)	China	34	1,222	11	64	China
42	2025 Asian Youth Games (3)	Bahrain	45	4,051	26	264	China
43	2026 Asian Beach Games (6)	China	45	1,635	14	64	China
44	2026 Asian Games (20)	Japan	46	10,787	43	469	China

- Asian Summer Games (1951–2026) (20) 5,614 Events
- Asian Winter Games (1986–2025) (9) 449 Events
- Asian Indoor and Martial Arts Games (2005–2017) (5+1) 1,083 Events
- Asian Beach Games (2008–2026) (6) 564 Events
- Asian Youth Games (2009–2025) (3) 476 Events
- Total : 44 Games (1951–2026): 8,186 Events

== See also ==
- Other continental governing body
  - Association of National Olympic Committees of Africa
  - European Olympic Committees
  - Oceania National Olympic Committees
  - Pan American Sports Organization
- Events of the OCA (Subregional)
  - Central Asian Games
  - East Asian Games (now defunct)
  - East Asian Youth Games
  - South Asian Games
  - Southeast Asian Games
  - West Asian Games
- Events of the APC (Continental)
  - Asian Para Games
  - Asian Youth Para Games
- Events of the APC (Subregional)
  - ASEAN Para Games
