= Sadiq Ali (freedom fighter) =

Indian politician

5th Governor of Tamil Nadu
- In office 4 November 1980 – 3 September 1982
- Chief Minister: M. G. Ramachandran
- Preceded by: M. M. Ismail (Acting)
- Succeeded by: Sundar Lal Khurana

9th Governor of Maharashtra
- In office 30 April 1977 – 3 November 1980
- Chief Minister: Shankarrao Chavan; Vasantdada Patil; Sharad Pawar; A. R. Antulay
- Preceded by: Ali Yavar Jung
- Succeeded by: Om Prakash Mehra

Member of Parliament, Rajya Sabha
- In office 4 November 1958 – 2 April 1970
- Constituency: Rajasthan

Personal details
- Born: 1910 Udaipur, British India (Now in Rajasthan, India)
- Died: 17 April 2001 (aged 90–91)
- Party: Indian National Congress
- Education: University of Allahabad, Aligarh Muslim University
- Occupation: Freedom fighter & politician

Sadiq Ali (1910 – 17 April 2001) was an Indian politician and freedom fighter.

== Early life and education ==
Ali was born in Udaipur in British India. He left home at a young age to pursue his studies at Allahabad University and then joined the freedom struggle and was jailed several times. During his studies, he saw the Nehru family in Allahabad closely leading the freedom movement and since then started participating in activities with the Congress in the national movement. He organized a dharna at the Allahabad University to boycott foreign goods and liquor, causing the British government to arrest and jail him.

In 1930, Gandhi's salt law was disregarded and he was jailed.

He was Office Secretary and then Permanent Secretary of the AICC from 1936 to 1948. In 1942, he stayed with Gandhiji at the Sevagram Ashram. In 1943, he was sentenced to two years under a personal satyagraha.

== Career ==
In 1947, Ali strongly opposed the partition of India and criticized the Muslim League's Two-nation theory. He entered politics after the Indian independence movement. He was a member of the Provisional Parliament from 1950 to 1952 and of Rajya Sabha from 1957 to 1970. He was also Chief Editor of the AICC Economic Review from 1958 to 1962 and 1964 to 1969.

Ali served as President of the Indian National Congress from 1971 to 1973, Governor of Maharashtra from 1977 to 1980, Governor of Tamil Nadu from 1980 to 1982, and Chairman Rajghat Samadhi Committee from 1992 to 1996.

He has continued to be Chairman of the Gandhi Smarak Sangrahalaya Samiti since 1985, an Chairman of the Gandhi National Memorial Fund since 1990.

Ali's publications include: "A Survey towards Socialist thinking in the Congress, Democracy and National Integration", and "The Vision of Swaraj".

He was governor of Maharashtra from 1977 to 1980 and governor of Tamil Nadu from 1980 to 1982.

He died on 17 April 2001.
