= Asian Esports and Mind Sports Games =

International multi-sport event

Asian Esports & Mind Sports Games
- Abbreviation: AEMSG
- Frequency: Every two years
- Inaugurated: 2027 Asian Esports & Mind Sports Games in Kuwait city, Kuwait
- Most recent: 2026 in Aichi-Nagoya, Japan

The Asian Esports and Mind Sports Games (abbreviated as AEMSG) is a pancontinental multi-sport event held every two years among athletes from all over Asia. It is organised by the Olympic Council of Asia (OCA) and consists of Esports and Mind sports events with TV broadcasting potential.

The event will be centered around esports and mind sports like chess. The 2027 event in Kuwait will mark the last appearance of Esport at the Asian Games.

== History ==
In November 2024, the OCA was planning to remove esports from the Asian Games with plans to create a separate competition for non-traditional sports including chess and card games. During the 90th OCA Board Executive meeting, eSports was removed from the Asian Games sports programme.

However, in 2025, the OCA's executive board approved 11 video game titles for the esports tournament, and finalised on 22 February 2025 with an updated line-up, which included 13 video game titles in 11 events. Sports that are part of 2026 Asian Games,

- eFootball
- Gran Turismo 7
- Honor of Kings
- Naraka: Bladepoint
- Puyo Puyo Champions
- Identity V
- League of Legends
- Mobile Legends: Bang Bang
- Pokémon Unite
- PUBG Mobile
- Street Fighter 6 (will be played as single event)
- Tekken 8 (will be played as single event)
- The King of Fighters XV (will be played as single event)

Besides, Virtual Taekwondo will be contested as a decipline of Taekwondo.

On 29 September 2026 at the 110th board meeting, OCA held discussion with Kuwait and signed host agreement for inaugural event of the games.

== Core sports ==
The sports that shall be part of the games as recommended by the OCA,

- Chess
- Checkers
- Go
- Xiangqi
- Bridge
- Card game

== See also ==
- Esports at the 2026 Asian Games
- Esports at the 2025 SEA Games
