= Bhalindra Singh =

Indian sports administrator and politician (1919–1992)

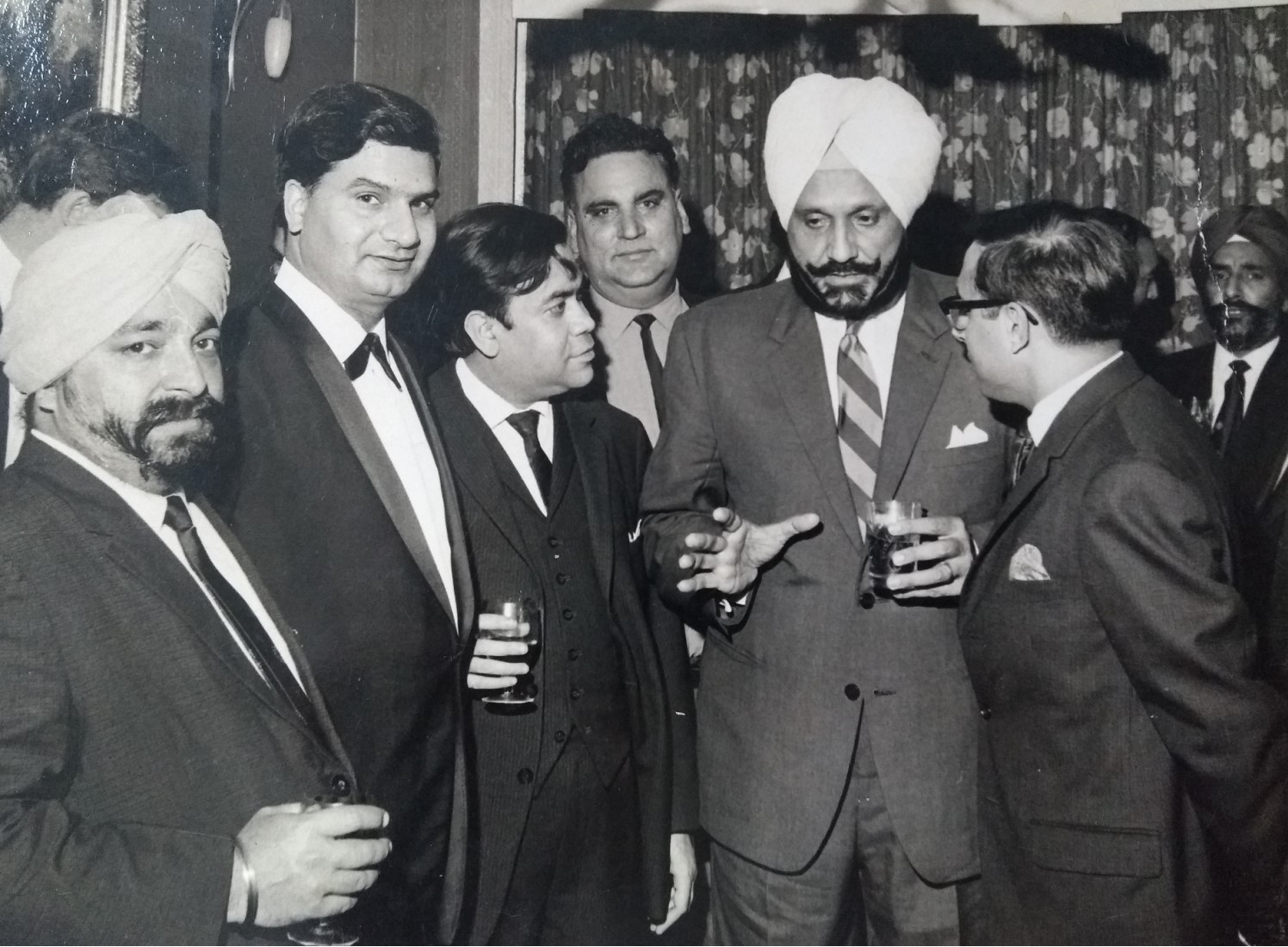
- Singh (second from right) in London, England

4th & 6th President of the Indian Olympic Association
- In office 1960–1975
- Preceded by: Yadavindra Singh
- Succeeded by: Om Prakash Mehra
- In office 1980–1984
- Preceded by: Om Prakash Mehra
- Succeeded by: Vidya Charan Shukla

Member of the International Olympic Committee
- In office 1947–1992

Member of the Punjab Legislative Assembly
- In office 1958–1962
- Preceded by: Surinder Singh
- Succeeded by: Ram Partap
- Constituency: Patiala

Personal details
- Born: 9 October 1919 Patiala, Punjab Province, British India
- Died: 16 April 1992 (aged 72)
- Relations: Phulkian dynasty
- Children: 4, including Randhir Singh
- Parent(s): Bhupinder Singh (father); Jaswant Kaur (mother)
- Education: Aitchison College
- Alma mater: Magdalene College, Cambridge
- Cricket career

Cricket information
- Batting: Right-handed
- Bowling: Right-arm slow

Career statistics
Competition	First-class
Matches	13
Runs scored	392
Batting average	21.77
100s/50s	1/1
Top score	109
Balls bowled	1284
Wickets	25
Bowling average	27.00
5 wickets in innings	0
10 wickets in match	0
Best bowling	4/34
Catches/stumpings	4/0
- Source: ESPNcricinfo

Bhalindra Singh (9 October 1919 – 16 April 1992) was an Indian sports administrator, politician and first-class cricketer. Singh was an influential sports administrator who held positions in international and Indian sports governing bodies. He was a member of the International Olympic Committee from 1947 to 1992. Singh was also a Member of the Legislative Assembly (MLA) from Patiala in the Punjab Legislative Assembly.

== Background and education ==
Bhalindra Singh was born on 9 October 1919 in Patiala, Punjab Province, British India. He was a younger son of Maharaja Bhupinder Singh of Patiala and a member of the Phulkian dynasty. Singh's mother was Jaswant Kaur. His mother, Jaswant, was the sister of Gian Singh Rarewala, who was the first Chief Minister of the former state of Patiala and East Punjab States Union (PEPSU), and a former President of the Shiromani Gurdwara Parbandhak Committee. His elder brother was Yadavindra Singh, the last ruling Maharaja of Patiala. Nirlep Kaur, Singh's cousin and the daughter of his uncle, Gian Singh Rarewala, was a politician who served as a Member of Parliament in the Lok Sabha and her husband, Rajdev Singh Akoi, was an owner of The Imperial, a luxury hotel in New Delhi.

Singh was educated at Aitchison College in Lahore and later attended Magdalene College, Cambridge in England.

== Cricket career ==
Singh was a right-handed middle order batsman and right arm slow bowler. During his time at the University of Cambridge, he played one match for the Cambridge University Cricket Club against Northamptonshire County Cricket Club in 1939. After Cambridge, Singh played 12 matches in India for Southern Punjab and Patiala. In the 1943 to 1944 season, he made his only century while playing for Southern Punjab against Northern India.

== Sports administration career ==
After finishing his cricket career, Singh became a sports administrator, and he held positions in international and domestic sports governing bodies.

Singh was a member of the International Olympic Committee (IOC) from 1947 to 1992 and had also served on the IOC's executive board. He was instrumental in organising and bringing the 9th Asian Games to Delhi in 1982. Singh also served as the President of the Asian Games Federation.

Singh was President of the Athletics Federation of India from 1952 to 1968. He was also the President of the Swimming Federation of India from 1952 to 1955. Singh was the President of the Indian Olympic Association (IOA) from 1960 to 1975 and from 1980 to 1984. The Raja Bhalindra Singh Trophy is named after Singh and is awarded to the team that wins the highest number of gold medals at the National Games of India.

== Political career ==
Singh was a Member of the Legislative Assembly (MLA) from the Patiala Assembly constituency from 1958 to 1962. He was elected to the Punjab Legislative Assembly as an independent candidate.

== Awards ==
- Padma Bhushan – 1983
- Service Award by the United States Sports Academy – 1983

== Personal life and family ==
Singh was married to Pushpa Kumari, the daughter of Charat Singh, the ruler of Sahanpur, and the paternal aunt of Bharatendra Singh, a former Lok Sabha Member of Parliament and a former member of the court of Aligarh Muslim University. Singh had 3 daughters and one son. His son, Randhir Singh, served as a member of the International Olympic Committee, as the President of the Olympic Council of Asia and in various other sports administration roles. His granddaughter Rajeshwari Kumari, the daughter of his son Randhir, has been an Olympic-level trap shooter. One of Singh's daughters was Padmesh Kumari, whose daughter, Shagun Khanna, married politician and businessman Arvind Khanna. Singh’s cousin through his mother Jaswant, was A. S. Dulat, former Secretary of the Research and Analysis Wing (R&AW), India’s foreign intelligence agency.

Civic offices
Preceded by Yadavindra Singh	President of the Indian Olympic Association; 1960–1975	Succeeded by Om Prakash Mehra
Preceded by Om Prakash Mehra	President of the Indian Olympic Association; 1980–1984	Succeeded by Vidya Charan Shukla
