= Yadavindra Singh =

Last ruling Indian Maharaja of Patiala from 1938 to 1947

Maharaja Sir Yadavindra Singh GCIE GBE
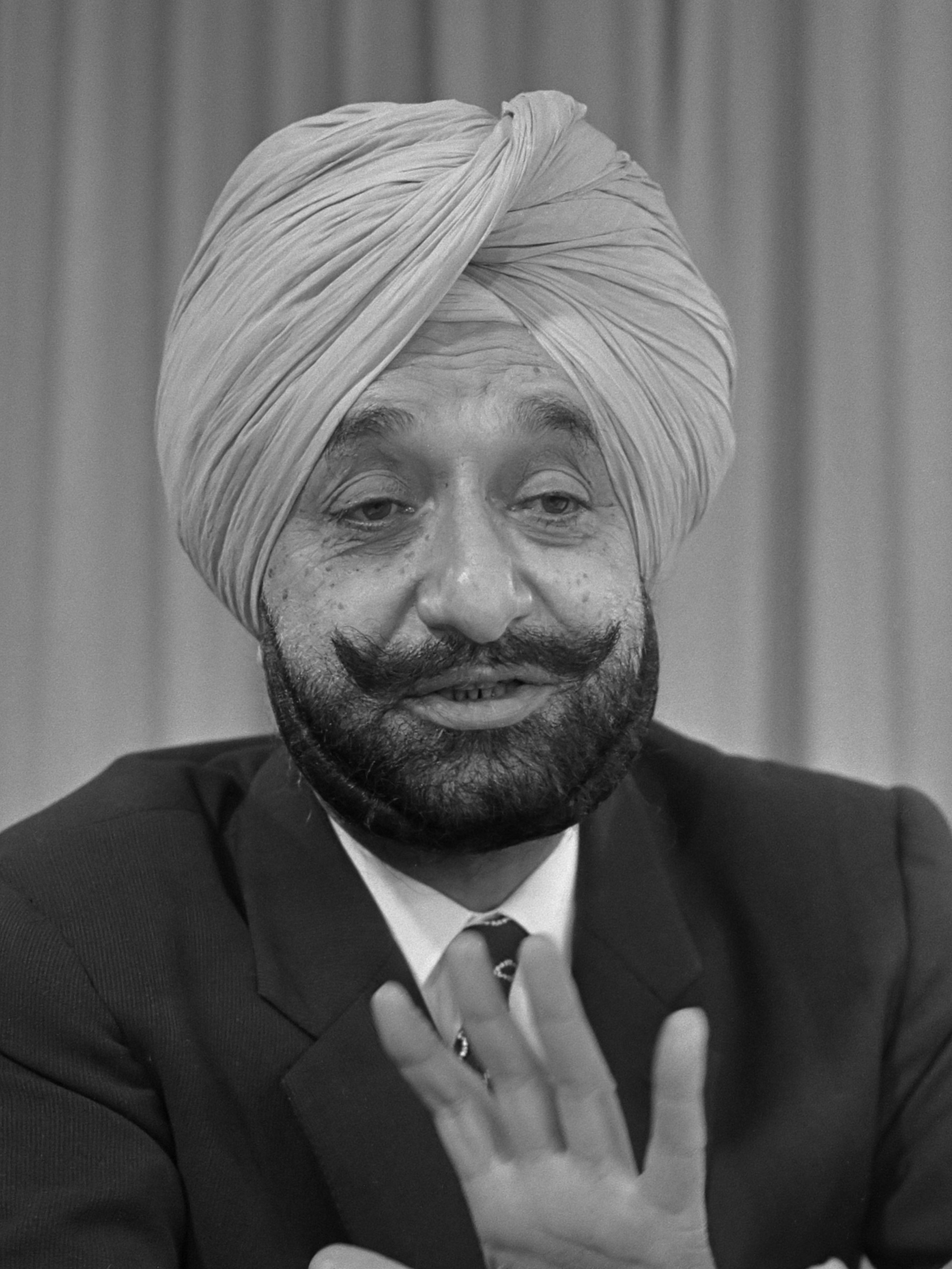
- Singh in 1971

Maharaja of Patiala
- Reign: 23 March 1938 – 15 August 1947
- Predecessor: Bhupinder Singh
- Successor: Amarinder Singh (as titular monarch)
- Minister of State: See list: Liaqat Hayat Khan
- Born: 7 January 1914; Patiala, Patiala State, British India
- Died: 17 June 1974 (aged 60); The Hague, Netherlands
- Maharanis: Hem Prabha Devi (m. 1935–1974) Mehtab Kaur of Patiala (m. 1938–1974)
- Issue: Heminder Kaur (daughter); Rupinder Kaur (daughter); Amarinder Singh (son); Malvinder Singh (son)
- Dynasty: Phulkian
- Father: Bhupinder Singh
- Mother: Bakhtawar Kaur
- Religion: Sikhism

Indian Ambassador to Italy
- In office 1965–1966

Indian Ambassador to the Netherlands
- In office 1971–1974
- Preceded by: Jagan Nath Dharmija
- Succeeded by: K. S. Bajpai
- Cricket career

Cricket information
- Batting: Right-handed

International information
- National side: India (1934)
- Only Test (cap 21): 10 February 1934 v England

Career statistics
Competition	Test	First-class
Matches	1	52
Runs scored	84	1,629
Batting average	42.00	20.88
100s/50s	0/1	2/7
Top score	60	132
Balls bowled	–	2,891
Wickets	–	50
Bowling average	–	30.73
5 wickets in innings	–	1
10 wickets in match	–	0
Best bowling	–	5/131
Catches/stumpings	2/–	32/–
- Source: ESPNcricinfo, 31 May 2020

Yadavindra Singh

3rd President of Indian Olympic Association
- In office 1938 - 1960
- Preceded by: Maharaja Bhupinder Singh
- Succeeded by: Bhalindra Singh

Yadavindra Singh GCIE GBE (7 January 1914 – 17 June 1974), also spelt as Yadvinder Singh, was the ninth and last ruling Maharaja of Patiala from 1938 to 1947. Singh kept his royal titles until 1971, when princely titles were abolished through the 26th Amendment to the Constitution of India. In his life, Singh was also a diplomat, sports administrator and former cricketer who played one Test in 1934.

== Early life ==
Born in Patiala City, Patiala State, within the British Raj (now in Punjab, India) in 1914 into a Jat Sikh family of the Sidhu clan, Yadavindra Singh attended Aitchison College in Lahore. He served in the Patiala State Police, became its Inspector General and served in Malaya, Italy and Burma during World War II. In 1935, he married his first wife, Hem Prabha Devi of Saraikela State (1913–2014).

Singh succeeded his father, Bhupinder Singh, as the Maharaja of Patiala on 23 March 1938 and subsequently married his second wife, Mehtab Kaur (1922–2017), in 1938. Although the stated reason for his second marriage was his first wife being issueless, it was speculated that the actual reason was the influences of Akali leaders who wanted the future Maharaja of Patiala to marry a woman from a Sikh family in order to beget genuine Sikh heirs.

== Reign ==
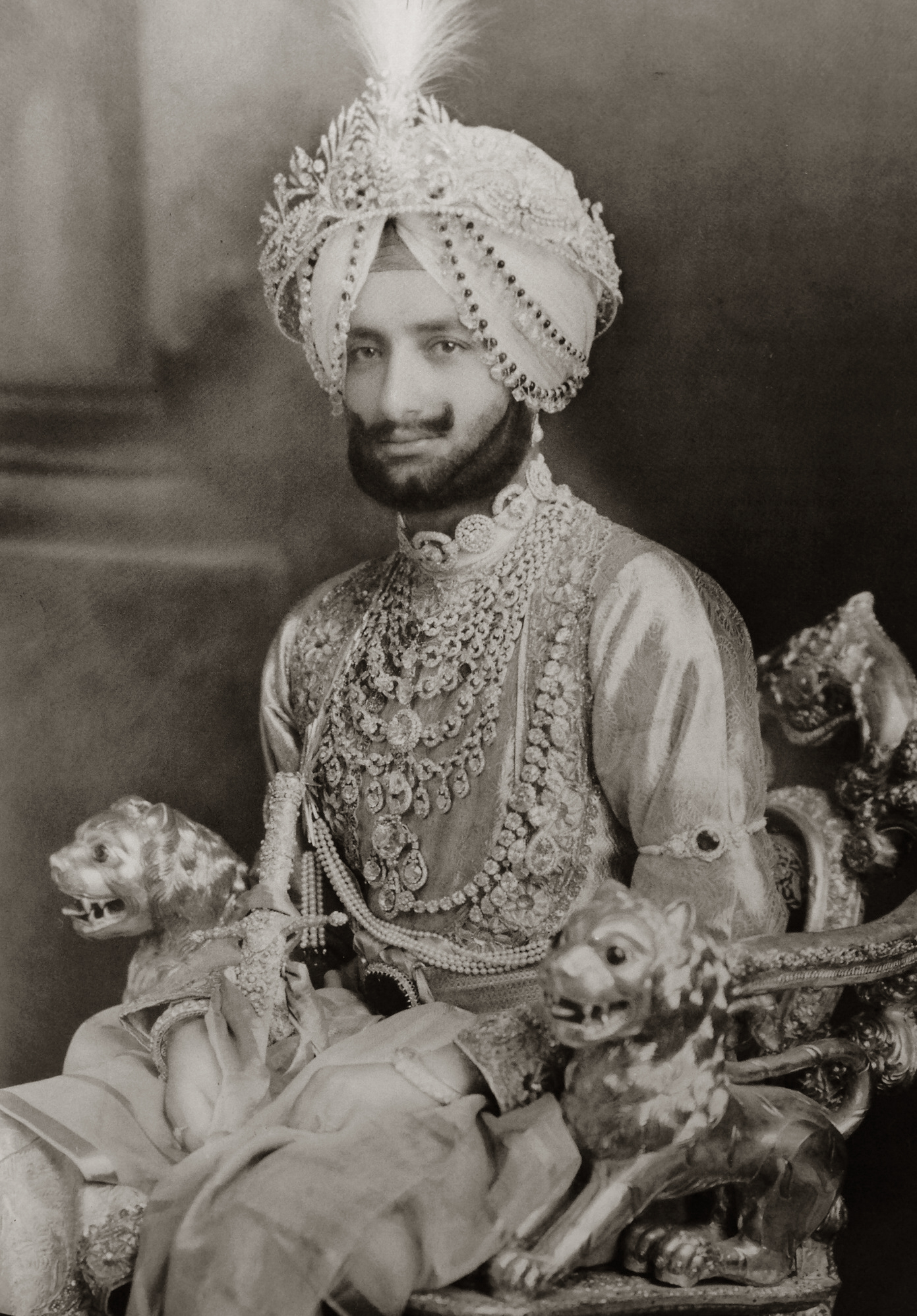
Official portrait, c. 1930s

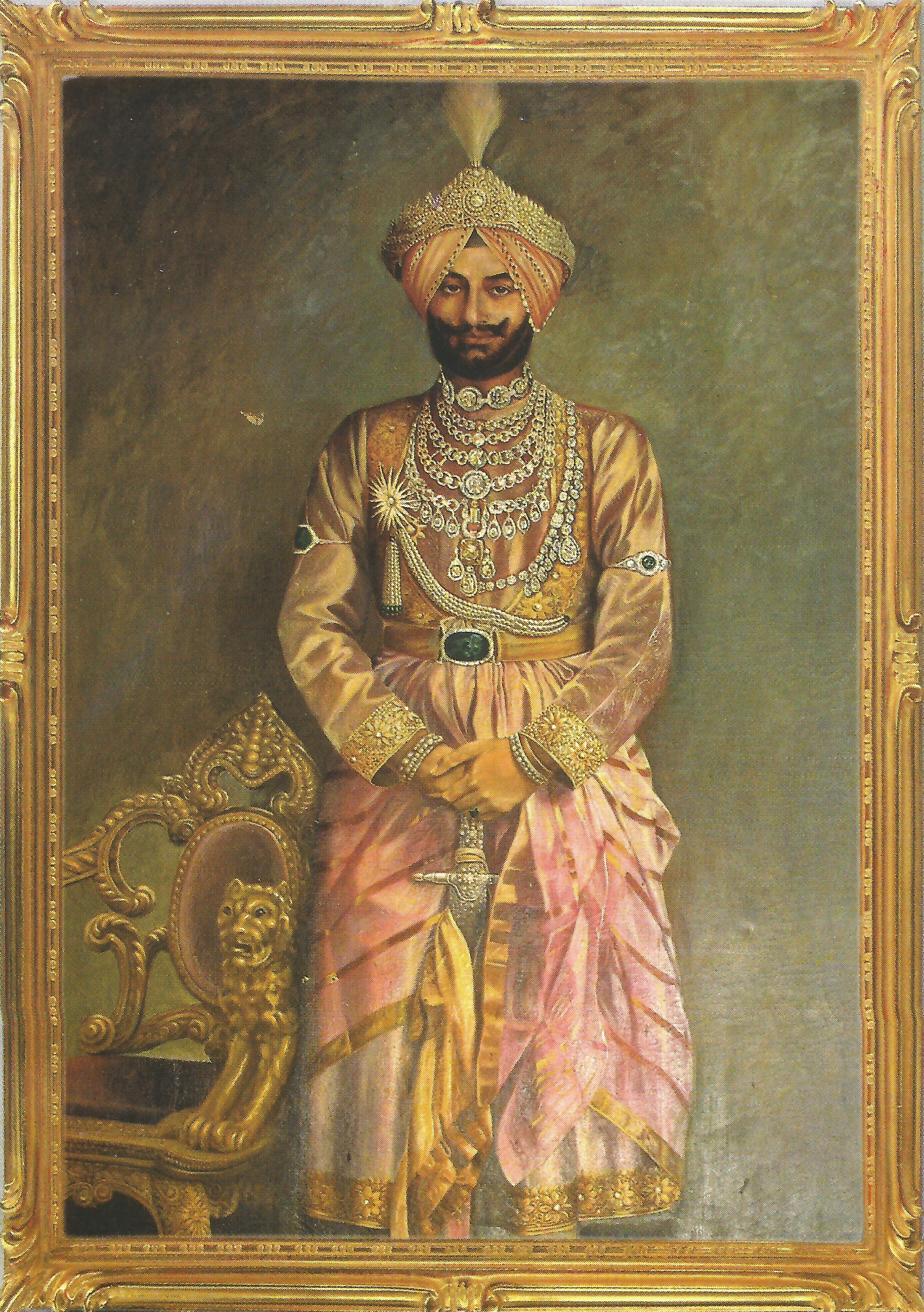
Oil portrait of Yadavindra Singh in the library of Yadavindra Public School, Patiala

Following his accession to the throne of Patiala, Singh pursued a political and diplomatic career, serving as chancellor of the Chamber of Princes from 1943 to 1944. In 1947, when India gained independence, he was the pro-chancellor of the Chamber of Princes. At a special session he said "After centuries time has come when India has gained independence from foreign rule and it's the time when we all (princely states) should unite for our motherland" and persuaded many other rulers to join India.

Singh also served as president of the Indian Olympic Association from 1938 to 1960. He led the founding and organization of the first Asian Games in Delhi in 1951. He was a noted horticulturist by passion and later served as chairman of Indian Horticulture Development Council. Patiala House, which was then the residence of the Maharaja of Patiala in New Delhi and later became a district courts complex, was completed by Singh. Singh was also a member of Freemasonry.

=== Partition of India (1947) ===
During the partition of India in 1947, numerous pogroms occurred in and around the princely state of Patiala. In several cases, organized bands of Sikhs were responsible for atrocities. The late Harkishan Singh Surjeet, of the Communist Party of India (Marxist), witnessed the events and claimed in an interview: 'The communal attacks on the minorities were definitely planned. I know more about the persons involved in the eastern wing because I was there. I saw those dreadful acts with my own eyes. In that conspiracy, the Maharaja of Patiala was involved and directly participated in the massacres. He was often armed with a rifle and a ceremonial dagger. The idea was that the Muslims were to be driven out.'. Nehru believed the Maharaja had sought to ethnically cleanse the territory of Muslims as part of this effort. Yadavindra Singh is quoted as having said "We won't leave a Muslim here" at a party with British officers. The Foreign Minister of Patiala, Sardar Bari Ram Sharma issued a denial stating "I definitely assert that no Patiala soldier has associated himself with or has been involved in any killings in any part of the East Punjab."

Singh agreed to the incorporation of the Patiala State into India. Singh was Rajpramukh of the new Indian state of Patiala and East Punjab States Union until it was merged with Punjab in 1956.

=== Donations ===
In 1956, Singh donated the Anand Bhawan, a 150 bigha palace, to the Government of Punjab (before the creation of Himachal Pradesh). Singh also donated Moti Bagh Palace to the Government of India, which became the Netaji Subhas National Institute of Sports.

He later founded Yadavindra Public School. Lal Bagh Palace, the building in which Yadavindra Public School is housed was donated by Singh. The Yadavindra Public School, Mohali is also named after him and was established by the members of his family.

=== Family ===
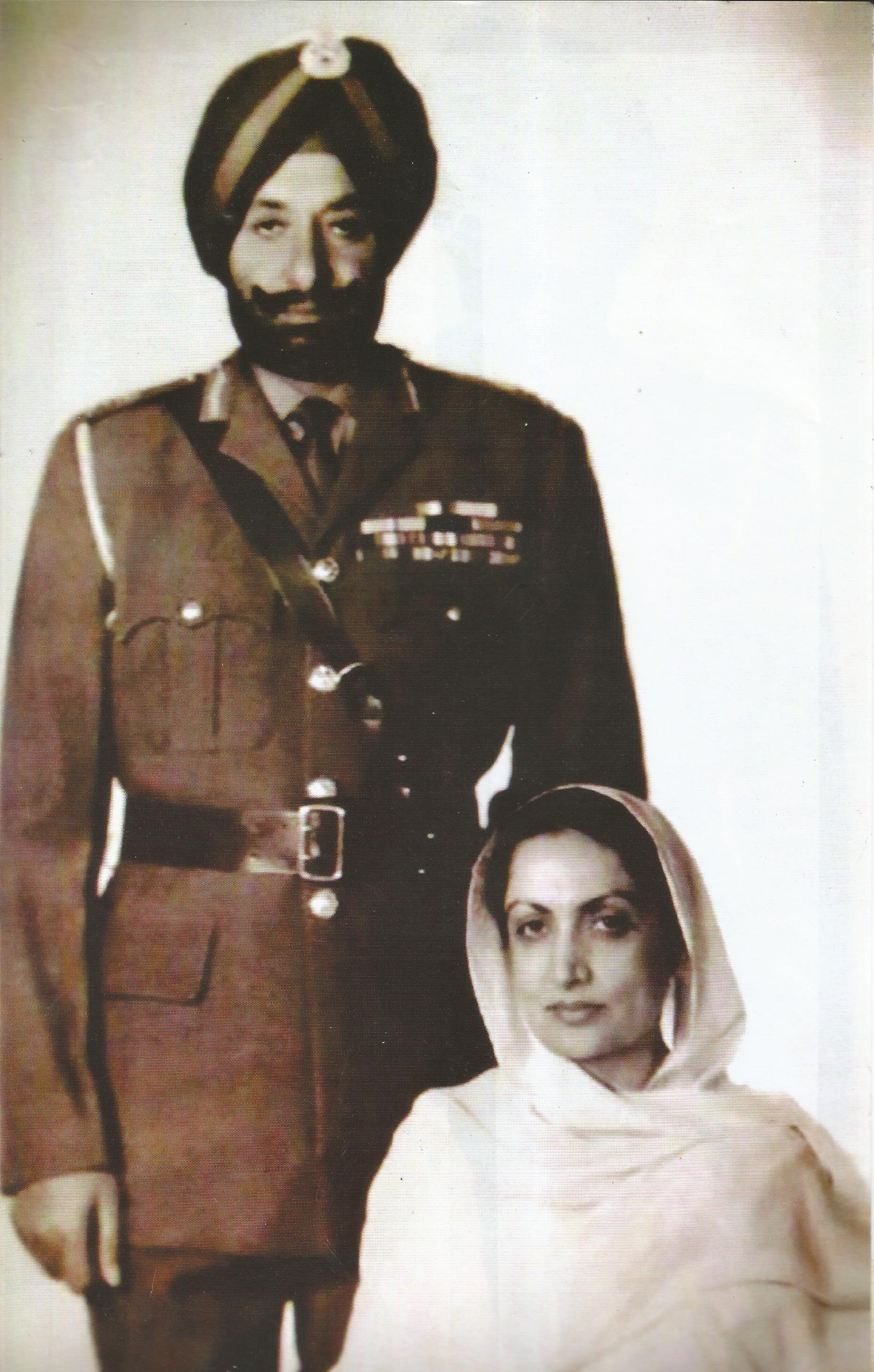
Yadavindra Singh and his second wife Mehtab Kaur

After succeeding his father, Bhupinder Singh, as the Maharaja of Patiala, Singh supported his siblings financially and arranged many of their marriages. One of his sisters, Naginder Kumari Khanna married Vipin Khanna. Singh's uncle from the Patiala family, Mahesh Inder Singh, served as his Military Secretary during Singh's tenure as Rajpramukh. Mahesh Inder Singh was also a Member of the Punjab Legislative Assembly from Sunam as an independent politician and a Freemason who served as the Worshipful Master of the Masonic lodge in Patiala.

== Later career and death ==
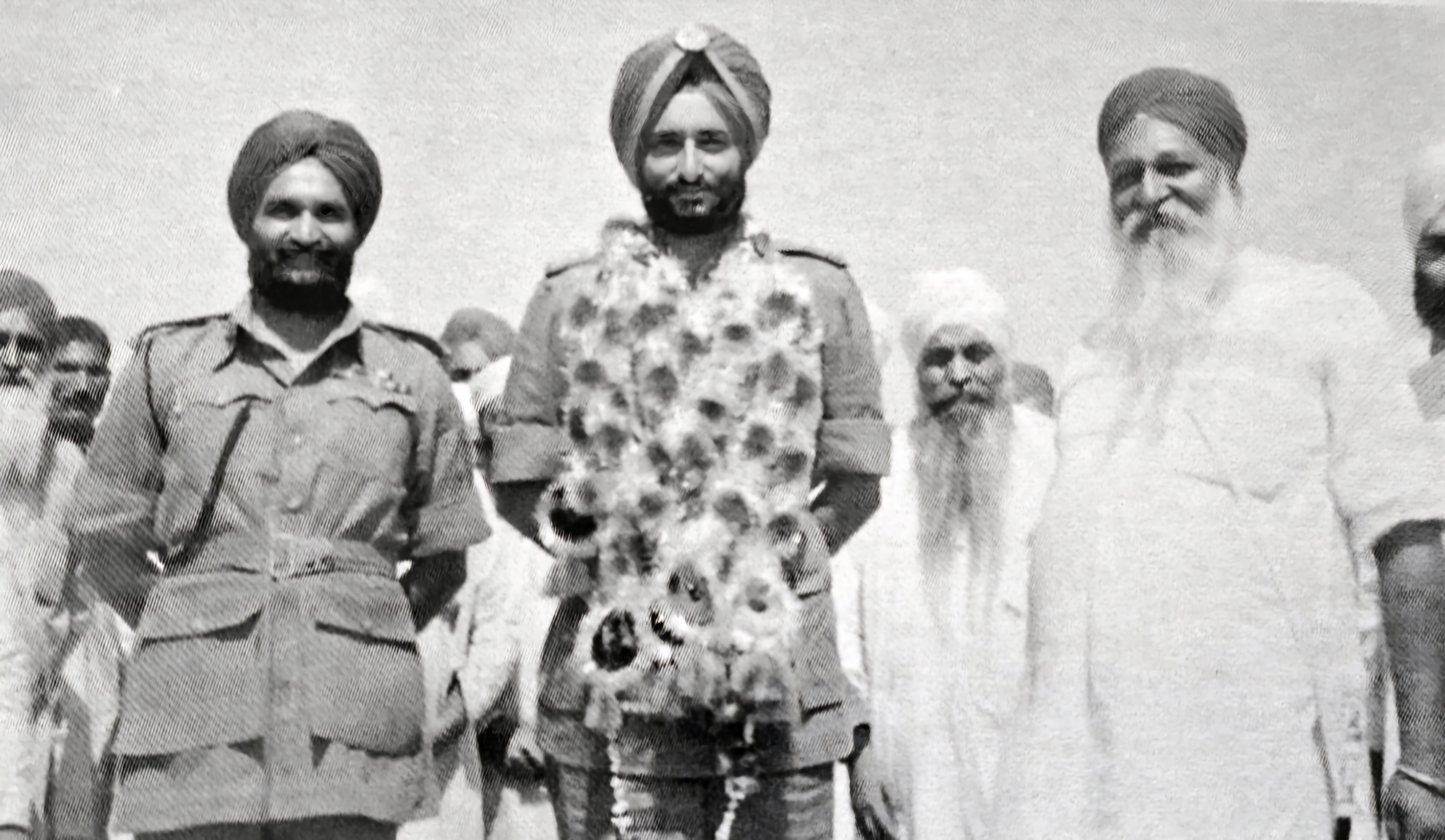
From right to left: Jathedar Udham Singh Nagoke, Maharaja Yadavindra Singh of Patiala and Major General Mohindar Singh Chopra at Guru Ka Bagh, Amritsar (1947).

Later in his career, Singh served as the Indian delegate to the United Nations General Assembly from 1956 to 1957 and to UNESCO in 1958. He also headed the Indian delegation to the Food and Agriculture Organization at various times from 1959 to 1969. Singh served as the Indian Ambassador to Italy from 1965 to 1966 and as the Indian Ambassador to the Netherlands from 1971 until 17 June 1974, when he died suddenly in office at The Hague from heart failure, age 60. On specific instructions of Indira Gandhi, he was cremated with full state honours.

== Personal life ==
Singh's wife, Mehtab Kaur, was a politician and served as a Member of Parliament in both the Rajya Sabha and the Lok Sabha. His son, Amarinder Singh, served as the Chief Minister of Punjab from 2002 to 2007 and from 2017 to 2021, and also served as a Member of Parliament in the Lok Sabha. His daughter, Heminder Kaur, was married to Natwar Singh, former Minister of External Affairs of India. Yadvinder Singh was tall, with his height being recorded as either 6'4" or 6'5".

== Titles ==
- 1913–1935: Sri Yuvaraja Yadavindra Singh Sahib-ji
- 1935–1938: Lieutenant Sri Yuvaraja Yadavindra Singh Sahib-ji
- 1938–1939: Lieutenant His Highness Farzand-i-Khas-i-Daulat-i-Inglishia, Mansur-i-Zaman, Amir ul-Umara, Maharajadhiraja Raj Rajeshwar, 108 Sri Maharaja-i-Rajgan, Maharaja Yadavindra Singh, Mahendra Bahadur, Yadu Vansha Vatans Bhatti Kul Bushan, Maharaja of Patiala
- 1939–1942: Captain His Highness Farzand-i-Khas-i-Daulat-i-Inglishia, Mansur-i-Zaman, Amir ul-Umara, Maharajadhiraja Raj Rajeshwar, 108 Sri Maharaja-i-Rajgan, Maharaja Yadavindra Singh, Mahendra Bahadur, Yadu Vansha Vatans Bhatti Kul Bushan, Maharaja of Patiala
- 1942–1944: Major His Highness Farzand-i-Khas-i-Daulat-i-Inglishia, Mansur-i-Zaman, Amir ul-Umara, Maharajadhiraja Raj Rajeshwar, 108 Sri Maharaja-i-Rajgan, Maharaja Sir Yadavindra Singh, Mahendra Bahadur, Yadu Vansha Vatans Bhatti Kul Bushan, Maharaja of Patiala, GBE
- 1944–1945: Lieutenant-Colonel His Highness Farzand-i-Khas-i-Daulat-i-Inglishia, Mansur-i-Zaman, Amir ul-Umara, Maharajadhiraja Raj Rajeshwar, 108 Sri Maharaja-i-Rajgan, Maharaja Sir Yadavindra Singh, Mahendra Bahadur, Yadu Vansha Vatans Bhatti Kul Bushan, Maharaja of Patiala, GBE
- 1945–1946: Major-General His Highness Farzand-i-Khas-i-Daulat-i-Inglishia, Mansur-i-Zaman, Amir ul-Umara, Maharajadhiraja Raj Rajeshwar, 108 Sri Maharaja-i-Rajgan, Maharaja Sir Yadavindra Singh, Mahendra Bahadur, Yadu Vansha Vatans Bhatti Kul Bushan, Maharaja of Patiala, GBE
- 1946–1971: Lieutenant-General His Highness Farzand-i-Khas-i-Daulat-i-Inglishia, Mansur-i-Zaman, Amir ul-Umara, Maharajadhiraja Raj Rajeshwar, 108 Sri Maharaja-i-Rajgan, Maharaja Sir Yadavindra Singh, Mahendra Bahadur, Yadu Vansha Vatans Bhatti Kul Bushan, Maharaja of Patiala, GCIE, GBE
- 1971–1974: Lieutenant-General Sir Yadavindra Singh, GCIE, GBE

== Honours ==
(ribbon bar, as it would look today; UK decorations only)

- King George V Silver Jubilee Medal-1935
- King George VI Coronation Medal-1937
- Knight Grand Cross of the Order of the British Empire (GBE)-1942
- 1939-1945 Star-1945
- Burma Star-1945
- Africa Star-1945
- Italy Star-1945
- British War Medal-1945
- India Service Medal-1945
- Knight Grand Commander of the Order of the Indian Empire (GCIE)-1946
- Indian Independence Medal-1947
- Grand Cross of the Romanian order
- Grand Cross of the Order of Merit of the Republic of Italy-1966

Yadavindra Singh Phulkian Dynasty Born: 17 January 1914 Died: 17 June 1974
Regnal titles
Preceded by Bhupinder Singh	Maharaja of Patiala; 1938–1947	Succeeded by Dominion of India; Amarinder Singh as titular Maharaja
Civic offices
Preceded by Bhupinder Singh	President of the Indian Olympic Association; 1938–1960	Succeeded by Bhalindra Singh
