= Gopal Krishna Nayak =

- Born: 7 December 1960 (age 65); Brahmapur, Odisha
- Education: IIT Kharagpur, IIM Bangalore
- Occupation: Director IIIT Bhubaneswar
- Spouse: Sanjukta Nayak (married 1988)
- Children: 1
- Awards: Long Service medals (25 years of service), XIMB

Dr. Gopal Krishna Nayak was professor of information systems at XIMB.

He was the director of IIIT Bhubaneswar.

== Research interests ==
- ERP and enterprise systems
- Group decision support systems
- Knowledge management
- e-governance

== Software development ==
His hobby is part-time programming. Various products have emerged from this hobby.

- Mandaar University Management System (M-UMS)– This is an ERP system for institutes of higher learning. It covers all aspects of an managing an institute including academics, accounting, payroll, HR, library, hostels etc.
- PAMIS – Project-based accounting system. This software has been adopted by the Panchyati Raj Department of Government of Odisha and is used to manage accounts of three tier panchayat system : 30 DRDAs, 314 Blocks, and above 6000 Panchyats.

== Administrative responsibilities ==
=== Present responsibilities ===
- Vice-president, BMMA
- Technology Adviser (XIMB)
- Director, IDCOL software Limited
- Director, OCAC
- Adviser, Panchyati Raj Department, Govt of Orissa

=== Former responsibilities ===
- Director, KIIT 2005–2006
- Dean, academic, XIMB 1999–2002
- Coordinator, Admissions, XIMB 1995–1999
- Coordinator, Information Systems Area, XIMB 1994–2002
- General Chair ICIT 2008
- Director, IIIT Bhubaneswar, Jul 2007 - Apr 2021

== See also ==
- IIIT Bhubaneswar
- XIMB
