= Electronics and IT industry in Odisha =

Electronics and Information technology industry in Odisha, India

Electronics and IT industry in Odisha refers to the information technology (IT), information technology-enabled services (ITeS), software services, electronics manufacturing and related technology industries operating in the Indian state of Odisha. The industry is primarily concentrated in Bhubaneswar, the state capital, with technology activities also present in cities such as Rourkela, Cuttack, Berhampur, Sambalpur and Balasore.

The development of Odisha's IT sector has been supported by the establishment of Software Technology Parks of India (STPI) infrastructure, development of IT parks, government policies, availability of technical education institutions and investments by domestic and multinational technology companies.

According to the Odisha Economic Survey (2024–25), Odisha crossed the US$1 billion software exports benchmark. The information technology sector in the state employs around 60,000 software professionals, either directly or through hybrid work arrangements, and has more than 500 IT companies, including national and global technology firms.

== Overview ==
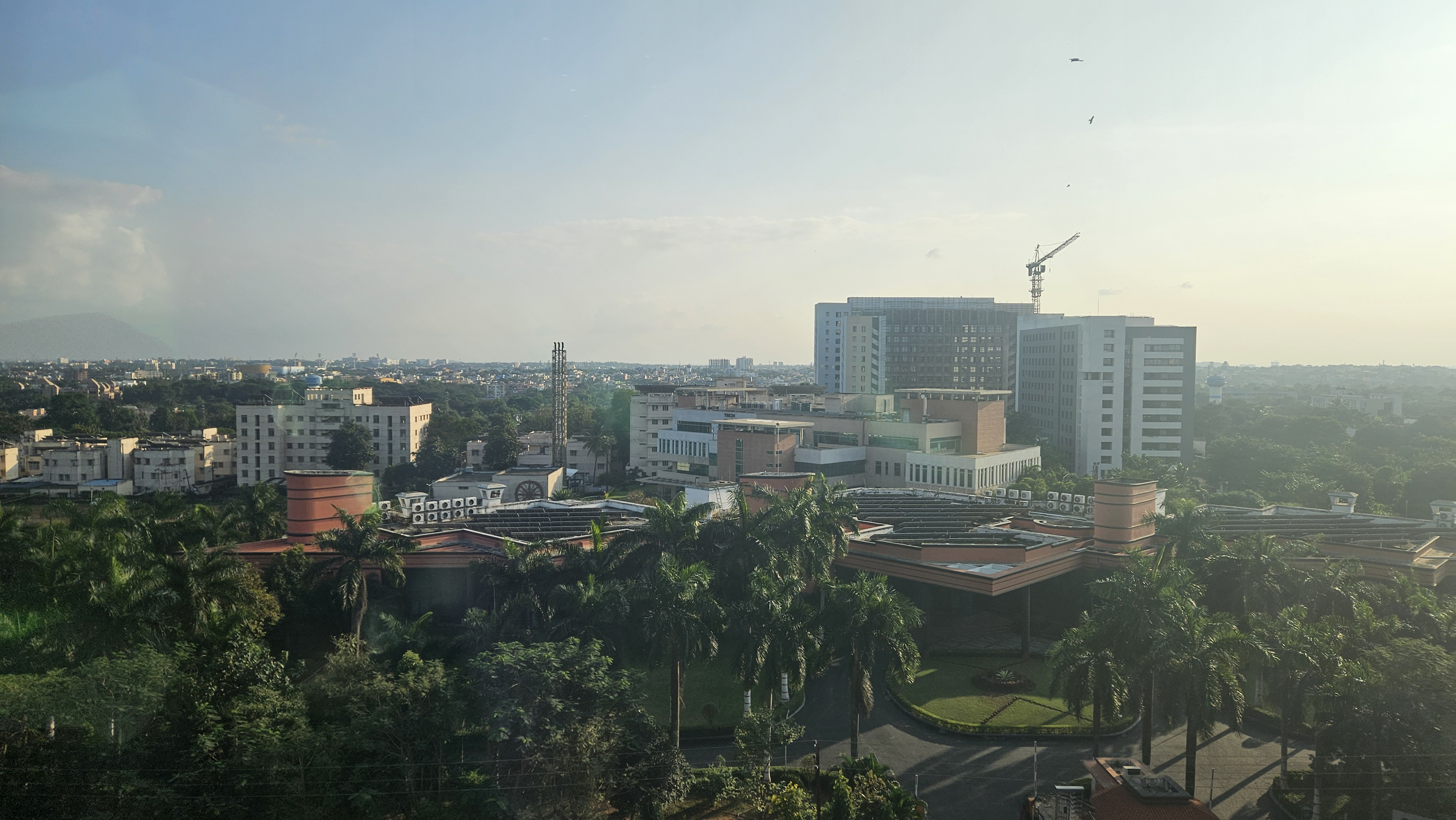
Tech Mahindra Campus at Maitri Vihar, Bhubaneswar

Bhubaneswar has emerged as the primary centre of Odisha's information technology ecosystem. The city hosts software development centres, IT-enabled service companies, technology startups, incubation centres and educational institutions supplying technical manpower to the sector.

The state's IT ecosystem developed around Software Technology Parks of India (STPI), Bhubaneswar, which has supported software exports and entrepreneurship in Odisha since the early 1990s. STPI Bhubaneswar states that it has played a role in the growth of software and hardware industries in Odisha and neighbouring eastern Indian states.

The Odisha government has identified IT, IT-enabled services, electronics, emerging technologies, startups and digital infrastructure as focus areas for economic development through its IT policies.

== History ==
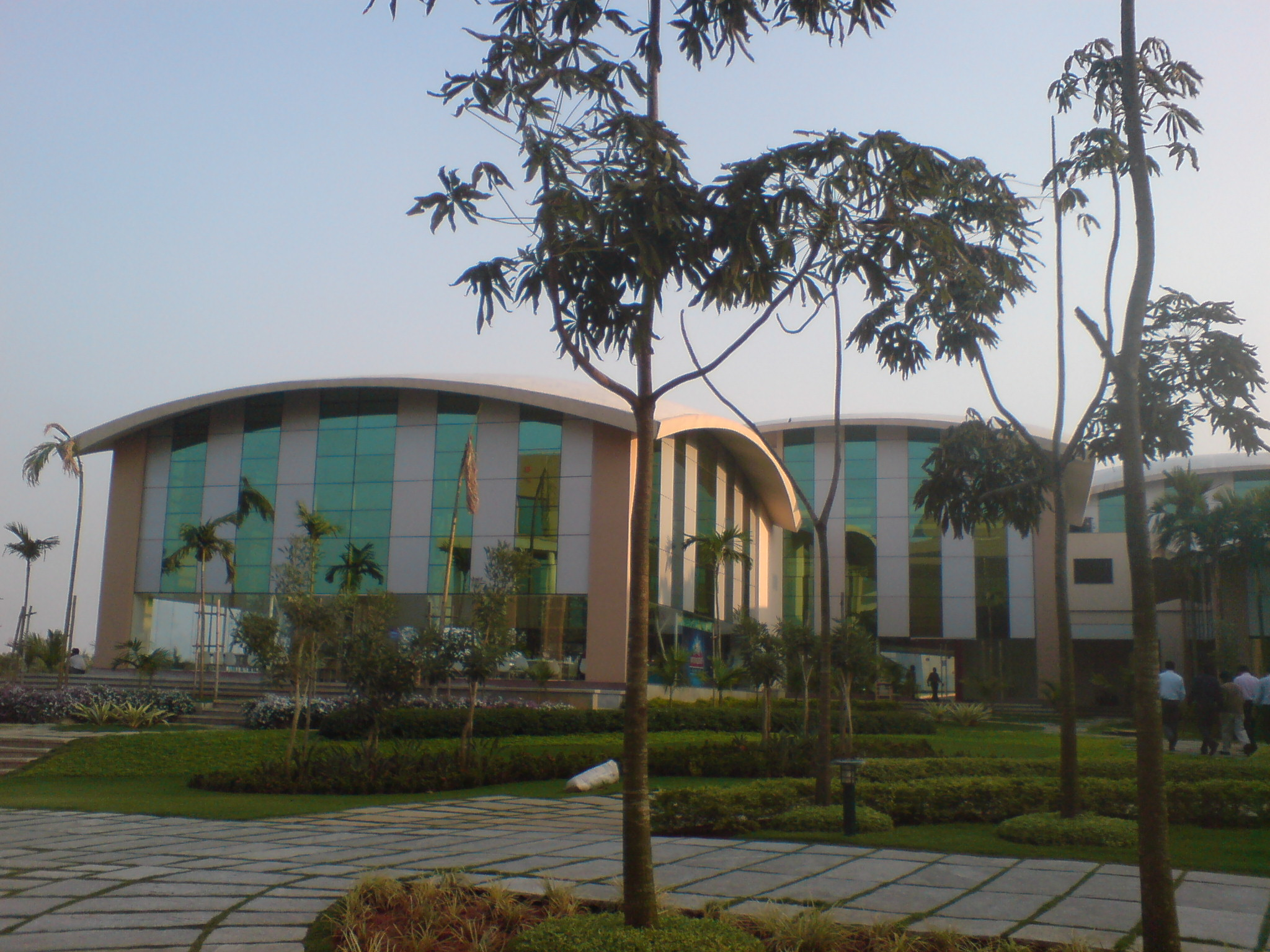
Infosys Bhubaneswar Campus at Infocity, Bhubaneswar

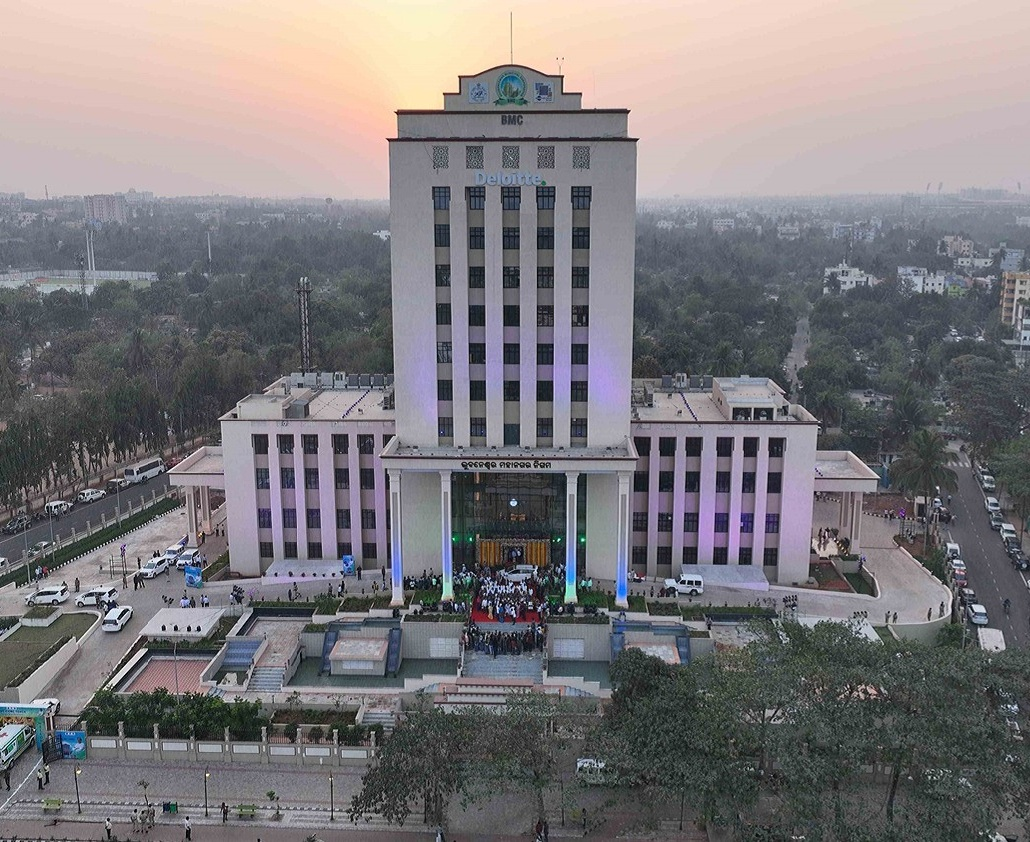
Deloitte India CEC at Bhoi Nagar, Bhubaneswar

The foundation of Odisha's modern IT industry was laid with the establishment of the Software Technology Park (STP) at Bhubaneswar in 1990. The centre was among the first three Software Technology Parks established in India along with Bengaluru and Pune, which later became part of the autonomous organisation Software Technology Parks of India in 1991.

STPI Bhubaneswar was established to provide infrastructure and support services for software exporters. Its objectives included promotion of software exports, providing communication facilities and supporting information technology and IT-enabled services companies. The initial STPI infrastructure at Bhubaneswar provided ready-to-use space for software companies. According to STPI, three units began operations during financial year 1992–93.

A major milestone in Odisha's IT sector was the establishment of an offshore development centre by Infosys in Bhubaneswar in 1996. The Odisha IT Policy 2022 notes that Infosys selected Bhubaneswar for establishing its first offshore development centre outside Karnataka. Following the entry of Infosys, other information technology companies established operations in Bhubaneswar, contributing to the expansion of software development and IT services activities in the state.

During the 2000s, Odisha expanded its technology infrastructure through dedicated IT parks and commercial developments. Odisha Industrial Infrastructure Development Corporation (IDCO) developed technology zones such as Infocity in Bhubaneswar to support information technology and knowledge-based industries.

The state government introduced IT policies aimed at promoting investment, infrastructure development, employment generation and adoption of information technology across sectors.

Since 2015, Odisha has focused on expanding its technology ecosystem through policies supporting IT and IT-enabled services, startups, electronics manufacturing, emerging technologies and digital infrastructure.

The Odisha Economic Survey 2024–25 highlighted Bhubaneswar's growth as an IT/ITeS destination, citing availability of technical talent, technology companies, incubators and dedicated technology infrastructure as factors supporting the ecosystem.

== Infrastructure ==
=== IT Special Economic Zones ===
Odisha has notified IT and IT-enabled services Special Economic Zones to support technology companies through dedicated infrastructure and policy incentives. Technology SEZ developments in Bhubaneswar include facilities associated with Infocity and other IT infrastructure projects.

==== Infocity ====
Infocity in Bhubaneswar is an information technology park developed by Odisha Industrial Infrastructure Development Corporation (IDCO). It was created to provide infrastructure for IT and knowledge-based industries in the state.

The technology zone houses offices of information technology companies and related organisations and has contributed to the development of Bhubaneswar's IT ecosystem.

==== Infovalley ====
Infovalley in Bhubaneswar is an integrated industrial and technology development project near Bhubaneswar. It supports IT, electronics and knowledge-based industries along with other industrial activities.

=== IT Parks ===
Below is a consolidated list of IT parks and its major tenants located within Bhubaneswar.

IT parks and standalone campuses in Bhubaneswar
Name	Type	Location	Major Tenants
BMC ICOMC Tower	Corporate Tower	Bhubaneswar	Deloitte
DLF Cyber City	IT Park	Chandrasekharpur, Bhubaneswar	Mindfire Solutions; PwC
Fortune Towers	IT Tower	Chandrasekharpur, Bhubaneswar	Bourntec Solutions; Software Technology Parks of India; Tata Teleservices; Tech Mahindra
IDCO Tower	IT Tower	Bhubaneswar	World Trade Center Bhubaneswar
iHub Tech Park	IT Park	Bhubaneswar	Aurassure; DATOMS; Grant Thornton; HIPSPL (3dGS); IBM; JSW Global Business Solutions; PwC; Sancode Technologies
Infinia Tower	IT Tower	Chandrasekharpur, Bhubaneswar	Fox Solutions; HyScaler; KrazyBee Services; Mavenir; Rhythm Innovations
JSS Software Technology Park	IT Park	Bhubaneswar	Capgemini; Logile
OCAC Tower	IT Tower	Acharya Vihar, Bhubaneswar	CSM Technologies; National Institute of Electronics & Information Technology (NIELIT)
Odisha Technology Centre	IT Park	Bhubaneswar	Accenture; Cognizant; Global Finance & Technology Network (GFTN); Integreon Managed Solutions; Nitkal
O-Hub Twin Towers	IT Tower	Bhubaneswar	Chubb Limited; Ernst & Young; IBM; PwC
OPTCL Tech Tower	IT Tower	Bhubaneswar	Secuodsoft Technologies
SRB Towers	IT Tower	Bhubaneswar	Coforge; Cozentus Technologies; IndiQube; iServeU; KFin Technologies
Utkal Signature	Corporate Tower	Bhubaneswar	Protiviti; Qtonix Software

==== Standalone IT Campuses ====
Standalone corporate campuses in Bhubaneswar
Company	Campus	Location	Type
AABSyS IT	AABSyS Campus	Infocity, Bhubaneswar	Corporate IT Campus
CSM Technologies	CSM Corporate Office & Development Centre	Infocity, Bhubaneswar	Corporate IT Campus
Discoverture Solutions	Discoverture Solutions Campus	Infocity, Bhubaneswar	Corporate IT Campus
ESSPL	ESSPL Campus	Infocity, Bhubaneswar	Corporate IT Campus
Infosys	Infosys Development Centre	Infocity, Bhubaneswar	Software Development Campus
Infosys	Infosys SEZ Campus	Infovalley, Bhubaneswar	SEZ IT Campus
LTIMindtree	LTIMindtree Kalinga Campus	Infocity, Bhubaneswar	Software Development Campus
Luminous Infoways	Luminous Tower	Infocity, Bhubaneswar	Corporate Tower
RAMTeCH	RAMTeCH Software Solutions Campus	Infocity, Bhubaneswar	Corporate IT Campus
SOUL Limited	SOUL Limited Tower	Infocity, Bhubaneswar	Corporate Campus
SPARC	SPARC Private Limited Campus	Infocity, Bhubaneswar	Corporate Campus
Tata Consultancy Services	TCS Kalinga Park	Infocity, Bhubaneswar	Software Development Campus
Tatwa Technologies	Tatwa Technologies Campus	Infocity, Bhubaneswar	Software Development Campus
Tech Mahindra	Tech Mahindra Campus	Chandrasekharpur, Bhubaneswar	Software Development Campus
Weaverbird Engineering & Technology	Weaverbird Campus	Infocity, Bhubaneswar	Corporate Tower
Wipro	Wipro Development Centre	Infocity, Bhubaneswar	Software Development Campus

==== Software Technology Parks of India ====
The Software Technology Parks of India (STPI) Bhubaneswar centre operates under the Ministry of Electronics and Information Technology, Government of India. It provides support infrastructure and services for software exporters and technology companies.

STPI Bhubaneswar provides services including software export certification, data communication facilities, implementation of Software Technology Park schemes and support for IT and IT-enabled services entrepreneurs.

The STPI Bhubaneswar jurisdiction includes sub-centres at Rourkela, Berhampur, Balasore, Jajpur and Koraput (Jeypore). These centres support IT and IT-enabled services companies across Odisha. According to the Ministry of Electronics and Information Technology, STPI centres in Odisha support 111 IT companies and around 14,914 jobs.

=== Data Centres ===
Odisha has developed data centre infrastructure as part of its digital technology ecosystem. The Odisha State Data Centre Policy 2022 identifies data centres, cloud computing and digital infrastructure as emerging technology sectors.

The Software Technology Parks of India (STPI), Bhubaneswar operates a Tier-III data centre facility providing hosting and infrastructure services for enterprises, government organisations and institutions.

Government digital infrastructure includes the Odisha State Data Centre and facilities associated with the National Informatics Centre (NIC), supporting e-governance applications and digital services.

==== Current Data Centers ====
Data centre	Operator	Location	Type	Status
CtrlS Datacenter Bhubaneswar	CtrlS Datacenters	Infocity	Commercial	Operational
Nxtra Bhubaneswar I	Airtel	Infocity	Commercial	Operational
National Data Centre (NDC)	National Informatics Centre (NIC)	Unit-IV	Government	Operational
Odyssey Data Centre (OSDC)	Odisha Computer Application Centre (OCAC)	Gajapati Nagar	Government	Operational
OPTCL Data Centre	Odisha Power Transmission Corporation Limited (OPTCL)	Janpath	Government	Operational
RBI Data Centre & Cybersecurity Training Institute	Reserve Bank of India	Infovalley	Government	Operational
STPI Data Centre	Software Technology Parks of India (STPI)	Gothapatna	Commercial / Government Cloud	Operational
RailTel Data Centre	RailTel Corporation of India	Rail Vihar	Government / Enterprise	Operational

==== Upcoming Data Centres ====
Data centre	Operator	Location	Type	Status	Investment
AdaniConneX Integrated Data Centre Park	AdaniConneX	Infovalley, Bhubaneswar	Commercial	HLCA Approved	₹104,550 crore
Adani–IHC Hyperscale AI Data Centre Hub	AdaniConneX, International Holding Company	Naraj, Cuttack	Commercial	Proposed	₹50,000 crore
SentraForge AI Data Centre & Global Capability Centre	SentraForge AI	Puri	Commercial	HLCA Approved	₹22,634 crore
HCLTech AI-Optimized Data Centre	HCLTech, Sarvam AI	Infovalley, Bhubaneswar	Commercial	HLCA Approved	₹14,257 crore
RKD Construction Data Centre Facility	RKD Construction	Naraj, Cuttack	Commercial	HLCA Approved	₹50,000 crore
Odisha State Data Centre 2.0	Odisha Computer Application Centre (OCAC)	Bhubaneswar	Government	SLSWCA Approved	₹266.48 crore
Zoho Data Centre	Zoho Corporation	Infovalley, Bhubaneswar	Commercial	SLSWCA Approved	₹306 crore

=== Global Capability Centres (GCCs) ===
Bhubaneswar has emerged as an emerging location for technology and business service operations due to factors including availability of engineering talent, presence of IT infrastructure, lower operating costs compared with larger metropolitan cities and development of commercial office spaces.

The Government of Odisha has identified IT services, technology-driven businesses and investment in knowledge-based industries as focus areas under its IT policies.

The GCC ecosystem in Odisha remains smaller compared with established Indian technology centres such as Bengaluru, Hyderabad, Pune, Chennai and Noida, but has expanded alongside growth in IT infrastructure and skilled workforce availability.

== IT/ITeS exports ==
The information technology and information technology-enabled services (IT/ITeS) sector has contributed to Odisha's services exports through software development, application services, business process services and other technology-enabled activities.

The Software Technology Parks of India (STPI), Bhubaneswar centre has played an important role in supporting software export activity in Odisha by providing infrastructure, certification and facilitation services to export-oriented technology companies.

Odisha's software export sector has crossed the US$1 billion benchmark. The growth has been supported by software development companies, IT-enabled services firms and infrastructure provided through Software Technology Parks of India (STPI) centres.

According to the Odisha Economic Survey 2025–26, combined exports of software, electronics and semiconductor products from Odisha increased from ₹4,500 crore in FY 2019–20 to ₹12,904.5 crore in FY 2023–24. The combined figure includes sectors beyond IT/ITeS. Software exports from Odisha have historically been supported by STPI-registered units operating under the Software Technology Park scheme. STPI Bhubaneswar reported that STPI-registered units under its jurisdiction contributed ₹3,840 crore in IT/ITeS/ESDM exports during financial year 2024–25.

Bhubaneswar accounts for a significant share of Odisha's IT/ITeS activity due to the concentration of technology companies, educational institutions, skilled workforce and commercial infrastructure in the city.

== Government policies ==
The Government of Odisha has introduced policies to promote information technology, information technology-enabled services and digital industries.

=== Odisha IT Policy 2025 ===
The Government of Odisha introduced the Odisha Information Technology (IT) Policy 2025, as the successor to the Odisha IT Policy 2022. The policy aims to strengthen the state's IT ecosystem by promoting investment, research and development, innovation, emerging technologies and employment generation.

The policy sets an objective of creating up to one million employment opportunities in the IT/ITeS sector over the policy period and aims to position Odisha as a destination for technology-driven research and development activities. The policy promotes sectors including software development, IT-enabled services, artificial intelligence, cloud computing, cybersecurity, data analytics, and research and development activities.

The government has supported technology infrastructure development through agencies such as the Odisha Industrial Infrastructure Development Corporation (IDCO), which has developed industrial and commercial infrastructure supporting IT companies.

=== Startup Odisha ===
Odisha has developed a technology startup ecosystem through government initiatives, incubators, educational institutions and private-sector participation. Startup Odisha is an initiative of the Government of Odisha to promote entrepreneurship, innovation and startup development in the state. The programme provides support through incubation, mentorship, funding assistance and ecosystem development.

Technology startups in Odisha operate in areas including software products, SaaS, fintech, artificial intelligence, healthcare technology, and digital services. Bhubaneswar serves as the primary centre for technology startups in Odisha due to the presence of incubators, universities and technology companies.

== Electronics and semiconductor industry ==
Odisha has been developing an electronics system design and manufacturing (ESDM) ecosystem alongside its information technology sector. The state government has identified electronics manufacturing, electronic components, embedded systems and semiconductor-related industries as priority areas for investment and industrial development.

The electronics ecosystem in Odisha is centred primarily around Bhubaneswar and the Khordha district at Infovalley, supported by existing IT infrastructure, engineering institutions, industrial land availability and government incentives.

Odisha has promoted electronics design and entrepreneurship through initiatives supporting startups, research institutions and technology incubation. The Electropreneur Park at Infovalley, Bhubaneswar was established to support entrepreneurs working in electronic system design and manufacturing.

Odisha has identified semiconductor-related industries as an emerging area within its electronics ecosystem. The state government has introduced policy measures to attract investment in semiconductor design, manufacturing, testing, packaging and related activities.

The Government of Odisha has also introduced incentives for semiconductor-related investments through its semiconductor and electronics policies, covering areas such as semiconductor design, fabrication support, testing, packaging and research activities.

=== Electronics Manufacturing Cluster (EMC), Infovalley ===
The Electronics Manufacturing Cluster (EMC) at Infovalley was approved under the Electronics Manufacturing Cluster scheme of the Ministry of Electronics and Information Technology. The cluster was developed to provide infrastructure support for electronics manufacturing and associated industries.

The EMC project is intended to support companies involved in electronic system design and manufacturing (ESDM), electronic products, components and related technology industries. The facility includes common infrastructure facilities aimed at attracting investment in electronics manufacturing.

Odisha has promoted electronics design and entrepreneurship through initiatives supporting startups, research institutions and technology incubation. The state's electronics ecosystem is also supported by engineering and research institutions involved in electronics, embedded systems, semiconductor design and related technology areas.

==== Semiconductor and ESDM ecosystem ====
Facility	Company / Institution	Type	Location	Status
ASP Semicon Facility	ASP Semicon Private Limited	Semiconductor / Electronics Manufacturing Facility	Infovalley, Bhubaneswar	Upcoming
Electropreneur Park	Software Technology Parks of India; Ministry of Electronics and Information Technology; Government of Odisha	Semiconductor / ESDM Incubation Facility	Bhubaneswar	Operational
Intel–3DGS Advanced Glass Core Substrate Facility	Intel; 3D Glass Solutions (3DGS); Heterogeneous Integration Packaging Solutions Private Limited (HIPSPL)	Advanced Semiconductor Packaging / Glass Core Substrate Manufacturing	Bhubaneswar–Khurda region	Upcoming
NaMo Semicon Lab	NaMo Semicon Private Limited; IIT Bhubaneswar	Semiconductor Research and Innovation Facility	IIT Bhubaneswar Research Park, Bhubaneswar	Operational
Nano Semic Research and Innovation Facility	Nano Semic Private Limited; IIT Bhubaneswar	Semiconductor Research and Innovation Facility	IIT Bhubaneswar Research Park	Operational
Odisha Semiconductor & ESDM Park	Government of Odisha; Electronics & Information Technology Department; IIT Bhubaneswar	Semiconductor and Electronics System Design & Manufacturing (ESDM) Park	Near IIT Bhubaneswar	Upcoming
RIR Power Electronics Silicon Carbide Semiconductor Facility	RIR Power Electronics	Power Semiconductor Manufacturing Facility	Infovalley, Bhubaneswar	Under Development
Sancode Semi OSAT Facility	Sancode Semi Private Limited (Subsidiary of Sancode Technologies Limited)	Outsourced Semiconductor Assembly and Test (OSAT) Facility	Infovalley, Bhubaneswar	Upcoming
Semiconductor Centre of Excellence (CoE)	IIIT Bhubaneswar; Government of Odisha	Semiconductor Research & Skill Development Facility	IIIT Bhubaneswar	Upcoming
Semiconductor Characterization Laboratory	IIIT Bhubaneswar	Semiconductor Testing & Research Facility	IIIT Bhubaneswar	Planned / Proposed
SiCSem Silicon Carbide Semiconductor Fab	SiCSem Private Limited	Compound Semiconductor Fabrication Facility	Infovalley, Bhubaneswar	Upcoming
TopTrack Hi-Tech HDI PCB Manufacturing Facility	TopTrack Hi-Tech PCB Private Limited	High Density Interconnect (HDI) Printed Circuit Board Manufacturing Facility	Infovalley, Bhubaneswar	Upcoming

=== Electropreneur Park, Bhubaneswar ===
The Electropreneur Park (EP) in Bhubaneswar is a Centre of Entrepreneurship (CoE) focused on Electronic System Design and Manufacturing (ESDM). It was established at Gothapatna, Bhubaneswar, as an initiative of the Ministry of Electronics and Information Technology (MeitY), Software Technology Parks of India (STPI), Government of Odisha and industry and academic partners to promote electronics product development, innovation and entrepreneurship in the ESDM sector.

The centre was established to create an ecosystem for startups working in electronics design, embedded systems and hardware product development, with an emphasis on indigenous product innovation and intellectual property creation. Electropreneur Park is located at the STPI ELITE facility at Gothapatna, Bhubaneswar. The facility provides incubation support, mentoring, prototyping assistance, testing facilities, industry connect and support for technology commercialisation for electronics startups.

The CoE focuses on areas including embedded systems, electronics product design, industrial automation, healthcare technology, agriculture technology, energy systems, education technology and smart city applications. The project was developed under the national ESDM entrepreneurship initiative of MeitY and was intended to support the creation and growth of electronics startups in Odisha. The facility was planned to incubate around 35–40 startups and strengthen the state's ESDM ecosystem.

Electropreneur Park forms part of Odisha's broader efforts to develop an electronics and semiconductor ecosystem by supporting product innovation, electronics design capabilities and technology entrepreneurship in the state.

== Education and talent ecosystem ==
The IT/ITeS sector in Odisha is supported by engineering and technology institutions producing graduates in computer science, information technology, electronics and related disciplines. The availability of skilled professionals has supported the growth of software development, IT services and technology companies in the state.

The Government of Odisha has also emphasised skill development programmes aligned with emerging technology areas such as artificial intelligence, cloud computing, cybersecurity and software services.

== See also ==
- Information technology in India
- Software Technology Parks of India
- Semiconductor industry in India
- Startup India
- Economy of Odisha
- Odisha Industrial Infrastructure Development Corporation
- List of special economic zones in India
- Make in India
- Digital India
