= White Knight (film) =

- Directed by: Aarti Shrivastava
- Written by: Aarti Shrivastava
- Produced by: Hari Om Entertainment
- Cinematography: Madhav Salunkhe
- Edited by: Anjani K Singh, Siddhartha Bhakti, Vinayak Khapre, Daya Yadav
- Music by: Daniel Arlington, Tony Basumatary, Utkkarsh Dhotekar
- Release date: October 2012
- Running time: 25.30 minutes
- Country: India
- Language: English

White Knight is an Indian documentary film directed by Aarti Shrivastava. The subject is Chewang Norphel, a 78-year-old engineer in Leh, Ladakh, who, over the last 15 years, has invented and implemented a technology that is helping provide a solution to an ecological disaster created by climate change.

The film documents how Ladakh is grappling with an alarming water scarcity situation. In this high altitude desert where the melting of glaciers has been the traditional source of fresh water, a warmer planet is playing havoc with lifestyles and the ecology. With glaciers melting faster, fresh water is precious. Norphel's solution uses common sense and elementary observational science to create artificial glaciers.

== Awards and recognitions ==
- Opening Film Water Doc Film Festival Canada
- Official Selection Jaipur International Film Festival 2013
- Official Selection South Asian Film Festival Canada 2012
- Official Selection Colorado Film Festival 2013
- Special Mention Women Deliver Cinema Corner Conference
