= Amar Patnaik =

Indian politician (born 1967)

- ଅମର ପଟ୍ଟନାୟକ

MP of Rajya Sabha for Odisha
- Incumbent
- Assumed office 28 June 2019

Personal details
- Born: 24 May 1967 (age 59)
- Party: Biju Janata Dal, Bharatiya Janata Party
- Spouse: Happy Patnaik
- Education: Lee Kuan Yew School of Public Policy, St. Stephen's College, Delhi, XIM University
- Profession: Politician
- Website: www.amarpatnaik.in www.amarpatnaik.com

Dr Amar Patnaik is an Indian lawyer, public policy expert, author, former Member of Parliament and a former Indian Audit and Accounts Service (IA&AS) officer under the Comptroller & Auditor General (CAG) of India and former Principal Accountant General (PAG) of Sikkim, Odisha, West Bengal, and Kerala. He opted for voluntary retirement in 2018, nine years before completion of his service career and joined the Biju Janata Dal (BJD) in the presence of party president and then Chief Minister Shri Naveen Patnaik on 29 August 2018 with a mission to give back to Odisha and Odias. From June 2019 to April 2024, he was a Member of the Parliament (MP) of India representing Odisha in the Rajya Sabha, the Upper House and also the General Secretary of the Biju Janata Dal Parliamentary Party Office at Delhi. He heads the IT-Wing and is also a spokesperson of Biju Janata Dal.

Patnaik is a regular columnist on public policy, governance and technology for several Indian newspapers and digital publications. Patnaik is an academic and author, and is a regular columnist in several leading newspapers and digital platforms. Currently, he practices law in various courts and tribunals, particularly the NCLTs, NGT, the Electricity Regulatory Authorities etc. He advises clients on privacy, data protection, technology and corporate and government affairs.

As an MP, he is a part of the Department-related Parliamentary Standing Committee on Finance for the third year in a row, a member of the Parliamentary Consultative Committee on Forest, Environment and Climate Change for the third year and a Member of the Rajya Sabha Committee on Sub-ordinate Legislation. He was a member of the Joint Committee of Parliament on the Personal Data Protection Bill, 2019 and the ad-hoc Committee of Rajya Sabha to study the issue of pornography on social media and its effect on children and society as a whole.

He is currently a member of the Joint Parliamentary Committee on the Bio-diversity Bill, 2021.

== Education ==
He graduated from St. Stephen's College, Delhi at Delhi University in 1987 in Physics after initial schooling in the Demonstration Multipurpose School, Bhubaneswar and the Buxi Jagabandhu Bidyadhar College, Bhubaneswar. He was awarded the Delhi University Gold Medal for being adjudged the best student in Physics in the year 1987. While in the civil services, he completed a Master's degree (PGDBM) in finance and systems from the Xavier Institute of Management, Bhubaneswar, Odisha in 2002 and a Bachelor's degree in law (LL.B) from Utkal University, Odisha in 2009. He further pursued a Master's degree in Public Management from the Lee Kuan Yew School of Public Policy, Singapore and the John F. Kennedy School of Government at Harvard University in 2010.

He was offered the British Chevening Gurukul Scholarship for Excellence at the London School of Economics by the Foreign and Commonwealth Office of the British Government in 2013. In 2015, he completed an Advanced Management Development programme from the Wharton School of the University of Pennsylvania, USA.

He also completed an interdisciplinary doctorate from the Xavier Institute of Management (XIM) University in Bhubaneshwar, Odisha, in Institutional Economics and Development Management. His thesis was published as a book by Palgrave Macmillan titled Institutional Change and Power Asymmetries in the context of Rural India in 2016.

== Career in the Civil Services ==
Amar Patnaik joined the Indian Civil Services in 1990 under its Indian Audit and Accounts Services. He served as the Principal Accountant General (PAG) in Odisha, Kerala and West Bengal under the Comptroller and Auditor General of India.

In his early career he was part of audit teams that led investigations into the Fodder Scam in Bihar and the Letter of Credit Scam in Assam. Under his leadership, many irregularities in Odisha including government land allotment were highlighted. He had also conducted audits of electricity distribution companies and brought to notice issues in revenue collection during the Odisha Olympic Association. He was also the Director of the Agricultural Marketing and Co-operatives Department of Odisha, India.

As Kerala's PAG, he oversaw several audits in state's taxation and licensing processes. He highlighted several malpractices that enabled the highest ever tax evasion in the state. His report brought to notice several shortcomings of the state government such as laxity in pulling in more traders within the tax net, wrong self-assessment by businesses, purchase suppression, sales suppression, and misclassification of commodities, application of incorrect rate of tax, part of turnover escaping assessment, and incorrect exemption. His other reports in the state highlighted irregularities in bar licensing, non compliance with the Kerala Conservation of Paddy Land and Wetland Act, 2008, and deficiencies in management of finance and inadmissible expenditure from the State Disaster Response Fund.

In Sikkim, he conducted the first-ever public audit of hydropower projects being developed then under a PPP arrangement.

Patnaik was noted for his work ethic and his diligence was often praised in the media even by political personalities.

== International career ==
In addition to detailed financial audits and value-for-money evaluations of Central and State government programs in sectors like health service delivery, water supply, consumer protection, poverty reduction, public-private partnership models, and issues relating to environmental protection and climate change, he has also conducted international audits of the Food and Agriculture Organization of the United Nations at Rome and in Kabul and of the United Nations Peacekeeping Operations in Darfur and Entebbe. He also completed a performance audit of the UN's spending on information and communication technology services across peacekeeping operations around the globe in October – November 2014 at the UN Headquarters in New York.

== Political career ==
Amar Patnaik joined the Biju Janta Dal, a regional party in the state of Odisha in August 2018 and was inducted by the Chief Minister and Party president Naveen Patnaik. He was also made Head of the Party's IT cell upon joining the party.

In the April and May 2019 general elections and the Odisha state elections, as Head of the IT cell, his work was noted for using improved data driven election strategy, evidence based review of party's MLA candidates, and the use of augmented reality and hologram projections. He also drove party's social media strategy and strategized on coining political slogans such as “Naveen mo’ paribara, shankha mo’ chinha” (Naveen is my family member, the conch shell is my symbol) that were effective in the election.

In June 2019, Patnaik was nominated by the party as the state representative and Member of Parliament in the Rajya Sabha, the upper house of Indian parliament. In his first year in the Parliament, he was appointed member to parliamentary committees on,

- Department-related Parliamentary Standing Committee on Finance
- Joint Parliamentary Committee on Personal Data Protection Bill
- Committee on Sub-ordinate Legislation, Rajya Sabha
- and an Ad hoc member of the Committee of the Rajya Sabha to study the alarming issue of pornography on social media and its effect on children and society as a whole

In the Parliament, he has raised several key issues including budget allocation to health, right to information, infrastructure, railways, law and order, finance, transgender people and women safety. Patnaik was also an early voice in the parliament on the threat of covid before the imposition of the national lockdown in India. Following the completion of his Rajya Sabha tenure in April 2024, Patnaik joined the Bharatiya Janata Party (BJP) in November 2025.

== Professional achievements ==
He is a Certified Internal Auditor and a Certified Fraud Examiner. He also has Certification in Risk Management and Assessment (CRMA). He has proficiency in English, Hindi, Oriya and Bengali.

=== Legal practice ===
After retirement from the civil services, Dr. Patnaik has taken up legal practice and has promoted A & N Legal Solutions LLP with a friend and Partner in Odisha High Court. Currently, he practices in areas of Company Law, the Insolvency & Bankruptcy Act (IBC), Environment Law and Electricity Law and offers consultancy on privacy, data protection and technology laws.

=== Covid work ===
Some of his contributions during the COVID-19 pandemic can be accessed in his reports “My First Year as a Member of Parliament” and “My Second Year as a Member of Parliament.” He is one of the few MPs in the Indian Parliament who has come out with a progress report of the work that he has done during the year and placed it in the public domain. Most notably, he has evidenced it by providing links to his social media posts during that time when the event occurred.

He has worked with slum children and in fabricating very unique e-auto ambulances to mitigate physical access issues for families located in interiors of Sundargarh District to the nearest health centres. He heads several informal Parliamentary Advocacy groups - on Handloom and handicrafts. Health and infectious diseases, Technology and public policy. He also mentors a think tank, Global Policy Research Foundation. He has also promoted ODIA Foundation & ODIA Foundation Trust in Odisha to implement and execute his ideas for the poor and downtrodden in various areas from grants and donations received from companies under their CSR funds as well as from private philanthropists.

== Personal views ==
Patnaik views his role in politics as extension of his policy career in bureaucracy and has been known for a systems reform approach even in political systems as head of the IT cell. He has frequently written on data protection and views personal data privacy as a fundamental right and has opined for an independent data protection body in India especially with regard to the imminent onset of artificial intelligence.

He has written about mistrust in Indian communities arising due to asymmetries in economic and social power. He developed a power-asymmetry-based framework in his book based on his doctoral research “Institutional Change & Power Asymmetry in the Context of Rural India” in which he argued that a champion with the right attributes and the 'ability’ to 'convene' people over a social issue can succeed if only he/she can resolve or reduce the deep-rooted societal power asymmetries within that community.

== Awards and recognition ==
1. Skoch for Literary activities
2. Peace Award in Delhi
3. Peter Drucker Award by Management School
4. Sansad Ratna Award 2022
5. SKOCH Challenger Award- Parliamentarian Of The Year
