= Ice stupa =

Artificial glacier mound for storing water

The Ice Stupa project
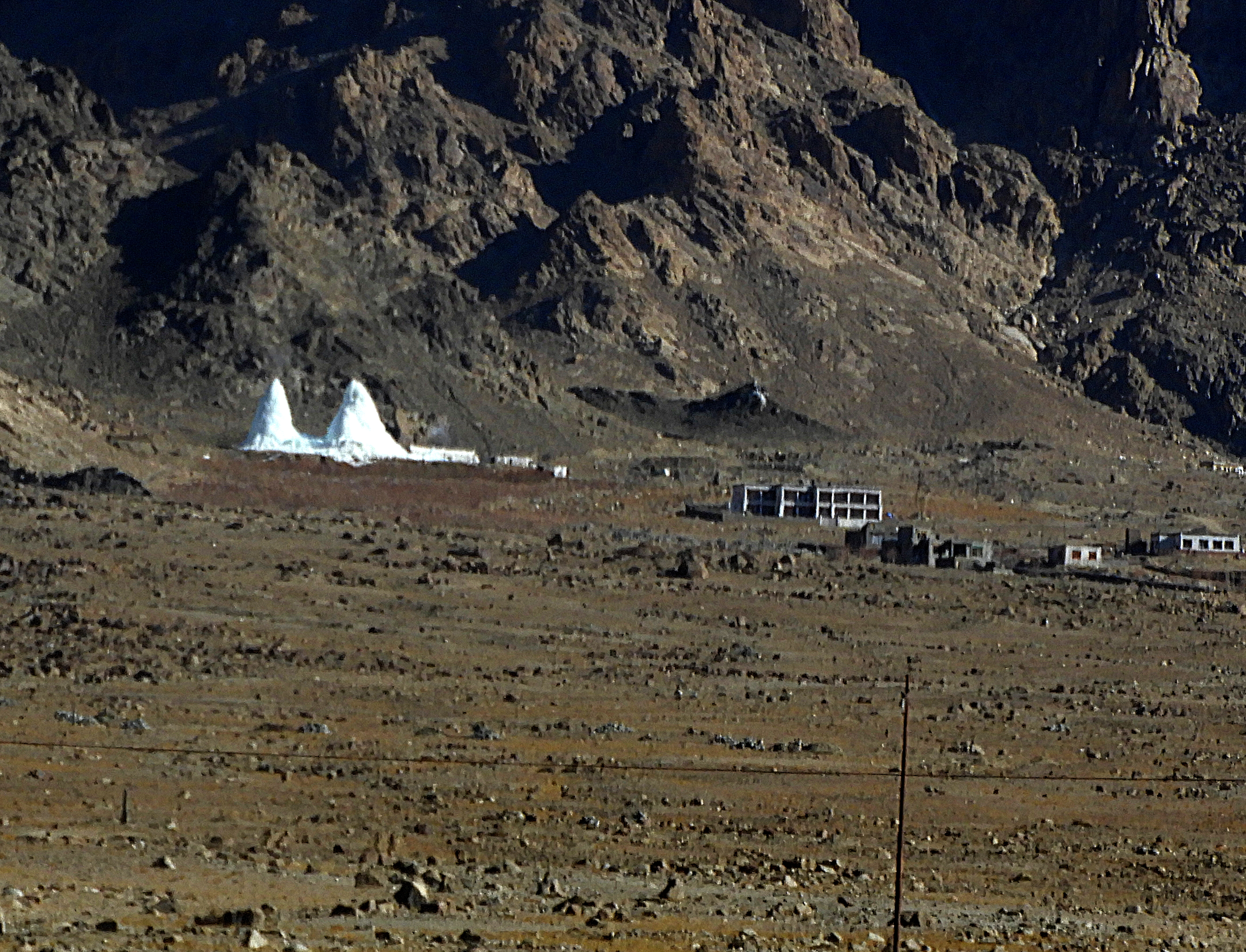
- Ice stupas near Phyang Monastery in February 2018
- Commercial?: No
- Type of project: Water conservation
- Location: Ladakh, India
- Owner: Students' Educational and Cultural Movement of Ladakh (SECMOL)
- Founder: Sonam Wangchuk
- Country: India
- Key people: Sonam Wangchuk
- Established: October 2013; 13 years ago
- Budget: Crowdfunding
- Status: Operational

An ice stupa is a glacier grafting technique that creates artificial glaciers, used for storing winter water (which otherwise would go unused) in the form of conical-shaped ice heaps. During summer, when water is scarce, the ice melts to increase the water supply for crops. Channelling and freezing water for irrigation has existed for hundreds of years. One of the modern popularisers is Ladakhi Chewang Norphel (1935–). It was again re-invented, popularised and scaled up by another Ladakhi Sonam Wangchuk (1966–) in Ladakh, India. The project is undertaken by the Students' Educational and Cultural Movement of Ladakh NGO. Launched in October 2013, the test project started in January 2014 under the project name The Ice Stupa Project. On 15 November 2016, Sonam Wangchuk was awarded the Rolex Awards for Enterprise for his work on ice stupas. Since Wangchuk's first ice stupa project, over a dozen ice stupas have been built in the region, providing over 25 million liters of water.

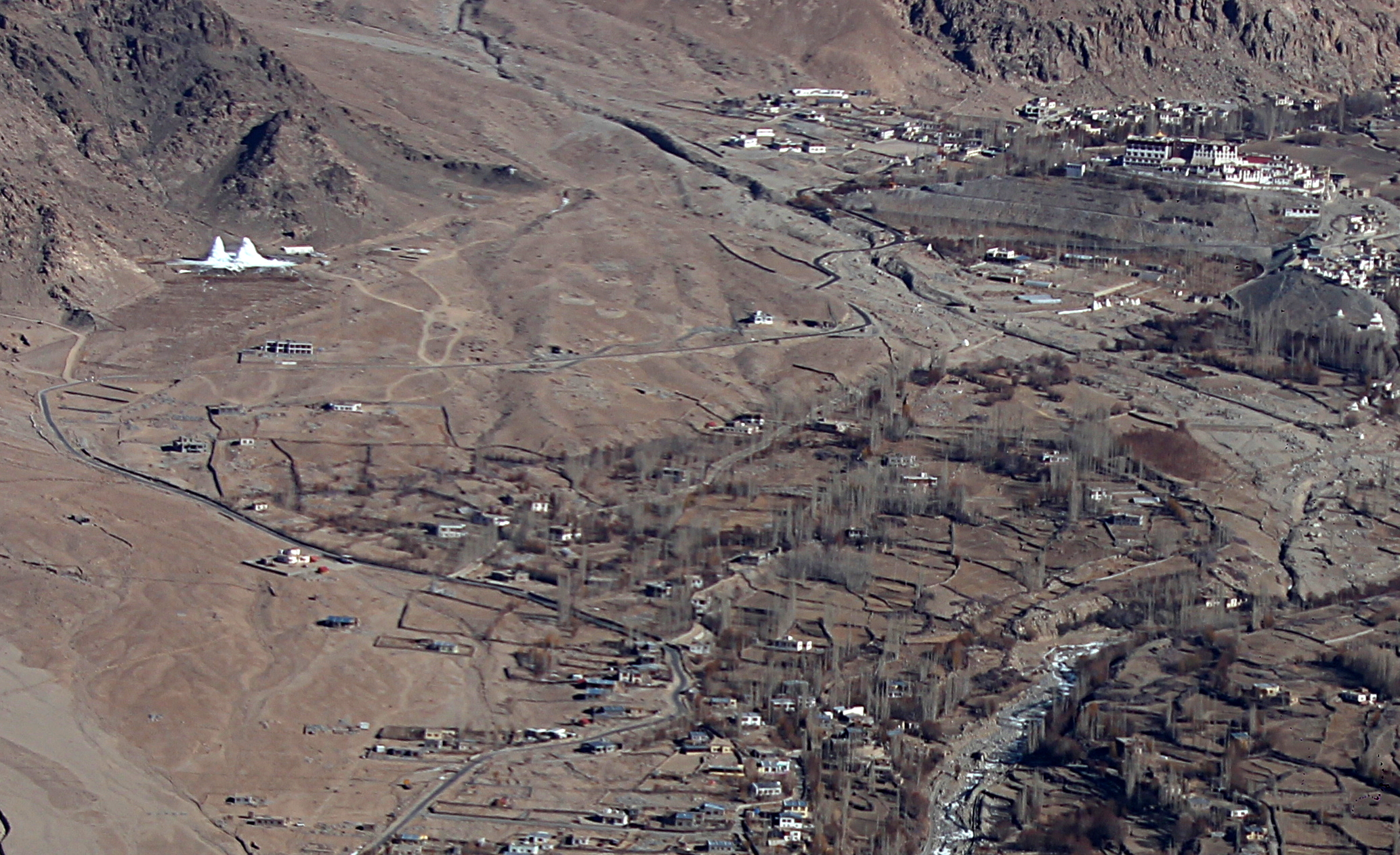
Aerial view of Ice stupa and Phyang monastery

Ladakh is a cold desert where agriculture is not practised during the winter due to frozen soil and low air temperatures. During spring, the water requirement for sowing increases, while at the same time, streams dry up. With annual rainfall of less than 50 millimetres (2.0 in), agriculture in Ladakh is solely dependent on snow and glacier meltwater. Due to climate change, the region experiences hotter summers with an increase in ice melt, together with a shift in the timing and precipitation of the melts. Subsequently, during the spring season, water is more scarce, which in turn impacts agriculture and food supplies.

In the month of May, Sonam Wangchuk noticed ice under a bridge. Despite summer temperatures and being at the lowest elevation in Ladakh, the ice had not melted because it was not in direct sunlight. Wangchuk realised ice could last longer in Ladakh if it could be shaded from the sun. Since providing shade to larger bodies of water was not possible, Wangchuk thought of freezing and storing water in the shape of a cone, which offers minimum surface area to the sun while containing a high volume of water.

In October 2013, Sonam Wangchuk created a prototype 6 metres (20 ft) high ice stupa by freezing 150,000 L (40,000 US gal) in Leh without any shade from the sun. Water was piped from upstream by gravity, without using electricity or machinery. The ice stupa did not completely melt until 18 May 2014, even when the temperature was above 20 °C (68 °F).

The Ladakh region experiences water shortage for the needs of agriculture during spring, which restricts even further the cultivation period in a subarctic climate area. By harnessing a fraction of the abundant wind, hydro and solar power potential of the Ladakh region without the need for energy storage, ice stupas can be made using snow cannons to irrigate all the cultivable land for crops, arcades, plantations, etc.

With the aim of promoting artificial glaciers and saving water for irrigation, an Ice Stupa Competition has been held since 2019. In 2019, 12 ice stupas were built, and in 2020, around 25.
