= Kiran Kanojia =

Kiran Kanojia (born 25 December 1986) is an Indian para-athlete, known as "India's blade-runner".

== Life and education ==
Kanojia belonged to a poor household in Faridabad. She excelled at academics and soon she was working at Infosys in Hyderabad as a test engineer. While returning from her 25th birthday celebration with her parents, she was pushed off a train by robbers trying to steal her bag, and her left leg was crushed leading to its amputation.

Six months after the incident, she returned to Hyderabad and enrolled herself in the Dakshin Rehabilitation Centre (DRC) to regain control of her life. It was here that she tried on a prosthetic leg. In 2014, Kanojia attempted the Hyderabad Airtel Marathon and won her first medal.

== Career ==
Soon, she completed a half-marathon, then six. As of March 2019 her best timing is 2 hours 44 minutes at Mumbai Marathon 2015. Kanojia is a champion blade runner and is invited to Delhi and Mumbai to run and flag off marathons.

== Awards and recognition ==
- Won a medal at the Hyderabad Airtel Marathon
- Winner of Women Transforming India Award 2017, organized by United Nations and NITI Aayog
- Selected as one of 12 "sporting superheroes" who featured in a calendar published in 2017 by Mission Smile.
