= XIM University =

Jesuit Catholic university in Bhubaneswar, India

- Motto: Semper Excelsius
- Motto in English: Ever Higher
- Type: Private Roman Catholic Jesuit, Non-profit coeducational higher education institution
- Established: 2013; 13 years ago
- Religious affiliation: Catholic Church (Jesuit)
- Academic affiliations: UGC AICTE BCI
- Chairman: Fr. Jerome Cutinha, S.J.
- President: Fr. Jerome Cutinha, S.J.
- Vice-Chancellor: Fr. Antony R Uvari, S.J.
- Location: Bhubaneswar, Odisha, India; 20°10′20.56″N 85°46′39.94″E
- Campus: Urban 55 acres (22 ha); XIM university Campus; additional Campus XIMB
- Website: www.xim.edu.in

XIM University is a Jesuit, Catholic university located in Bhubaneswar, Odisha, India. It was authorized by the Odisha Legislative Assembly in 2013 making it the first Jesuit university in India. Drawing its legacy from Xavier Institute of Management Bhubaneswar (XIMB), founded by the Jesuits in 1987, the university was facilitated by the Government of Odisha in 2013 and went on to be called XIM University with XIMB now being a constituent school offering only MBA-BM through XIM University. The other XIMB courses like HRM and RM are now continued by separate schools under XIM University. The sprawling XIM University campus is situated at Sundarpada Jatani road near Jatani town in the outskirts of Bhubaneswar. The Jesuits have more than 50 colleges and several hundred educational institutes in India but this is the first university they have founded in the country.

With support from Hewlett Packard and IBM, XIM University sees itself as the first fully digitized university in India.

== Organisation and administration ==
The XIM university follows the global model of higher education. Various programmes of the university are delivered from independent schools of the university under the supervision of the respective deans advised by Strategic Academic Advisory Boards (SAAB) consisting of academicians and industry experts. 50% of the seats of the university are reserved for students from Odisha.

=== Schools ===
==== Xavier Institute of Management, Bhubaneswar (XIMB) ====
The Xavier Institute of Management, Bhubaneswar is the constituent autonomous school of business management of the university and only focuses on Business Management. The establishment of the institute roots back to 1987 as a social contract between the Jesuit society & the Government of Odisha. After the establishment of the XIM university, XIMB follows the new standard of providing MBA and Ph.D. degrees in place of PGDM & Fellow programs. The earlier programs in the areas of Business Management, Rural Management and Human Resource Management being offered by XIMB have been moved to the new XIM University campus and converted into separate constituent schools.

==== School of Rural Management (SRM) ====
The Rural Management Programme was established in 1995 at the Xavier Institute of Management, Bhubaneswar. Initially, it was offered as a one-year post-graduation programme to professionally train the development practitioners working in various public service agencies. With the growing demand for professional manpower in the social sector, the one-year programme was revamped as a full-time two-year masters degree programme in 1998. The Rural Management programme at XIM is the second oldest full-time rural management programme of India after the Institute of Rural Management Anand. Currently, the school offers full-time and part-time PhD & MBA programmes in rural management at the new XIM university campus.

==== School of Human Resource Management (HRM) ====
The School of Human Resource Management was established in 2011 at the Xavier Institute of Management, Bhubaneswar as a full-time masters programme. Prior to that, the programme was mainly offered as a specialisation in the existing Business Management programme at XIMB. Currently, the school offers masters & PhD programmes in human resource management & labour studies from the XIM University campus.

==== Xavier Law School (XLS) ====
Xavier Law School, one of the constituents of XIM University, was founded in 2018. Xavier Law School, located in sub-urban Bhubaneswar, is an initiative to educate, train and develop talented young persons to be socially responsible law professionals. The school is equipped with digitally enabled modern Moot Court Hall, best of the class e-resources through e-Pathsala initiative and a collection of legal classics/books/journals to facilitate capacity building among students. With the motto to be one of the premier law schools in India, Xavier Law School is the first of its kind, in terms of facility & in teaching capacity building. Currently, the school offers five year integrated BA LLB (H) & BBA LLB (H) programs at the undergraduate level. These above academic programmes are recognized and approved by the Bar Council of India.

==== School of Commerce (XSC) ====
The School of Commerce, one of the constituents of XIM University was founded in 2014 to cater to the ever-increasing demand for commerce education in the country. It offers three-year graduate programs in Commerce and Management Studies with specializations in Accounting, Finance, Marketing and HR; and a two-year post-graduate program in Business Finance and Ph.D.

Besides the above three existing programmes and schools, the university has established several new schools in the emerging fields of education and research. A few of the GenNext schools currently operational at the university are:

- School of Human Settlements
- School of Sustainability
- School of Communications
- School of Computer Science and Engineering
- School of Economics
- Xavier Emlyon Business School
- School of Government and Public Affairs.

=== Academic research centres ===
There are a number of research centres operational at the university to carry out academic researches in various fields. The centres also provide part-time programmes and workshops at regular intervals.

- Centre for Excellence in Fiscal Policy & Taxation
- Centre for Humanities & Compassion studies
- Centre for sustainable ecological systems
- Centre for Business & Society
- Centre for Corporate Governance
- CII (Confederation of Indian Industry) – XIMB Centre of Excellence
- Centre for Development Research and Training
- Centre for Management Case Research
- Centre for Entrepreneurship development
- Centre for Development of Small and Micro Enterprises
- Team Orissa Project Advisory Centre (TOPAX)
- Centre for Resettlement and Rehabilitation and Corporate Social Responsibility
- Centre for Business Analytics & Digital Transformation

== Academics ==
=== Journals ===
XIM university, publishes the following journals in regular intervals:

- International Journal of Development and Social Research (IJDSR), published bi-annually, peer-reviewed
- Vilakshan, published bi-annually, peer-reviewed
- Journal of Case Research (JCR), published online bi-annually, peer-reviewed
- Research World', published annually, open-access

=== Rankings ===
In Outlook ICARE academic ranking 2020, XIM university has been ranked among top 10 private state universities in India. The Rural Management programme offered by XIM university ranked #2 in India after Indian Institute of Management Ahmedabad by Eduniversal best masters ranking 2019 in the Agribusiness/ Food Industry management category.

=== Student exchange programmes ===
XIM university engages in student and faculty exchange programmes with universities and institutions as mentioned below.

- University of Stellenbosch Business School (USB), Cape Town, Republic of South Africa
- Skarbek Graduate School of Business Economics, Warsaw, Poland
- KEDGE Business School, Bordeaux and Marseille, France
- Reims Management School, Reims, France
- Antwerp Management School, Antwerpen, Belgium
- Fordham University, New York, USA
- Sellinger School of Business and Management, Loyola College of Maryland, Baltimore, Maryland, USA
- Facultad de Economia – IQS, Barcelona, Spain
- Kyiv Investment Management Institute, Ukraine
- College of Management Law & Languages, Siauliai, Lithuania
- HHL-Leipzig Graduate School of Management, Leipzig, Germany
- IÉSEG School of Management, Lille – Paris, France
- Eastern Michigan University, Michigan, USA
- Warsaw School of Economics, Warsaw, Poland

== Student life ==
Most of the day-to-day activities starting from organising conclaves and festivals to administering canteen are run by students in both the campuses. The XIM university campus celebrates its 3-day flagship annual cultural management festival named as Xamboree every year in the month of September–October whereas the XIM additional campus celebrates Xpressions in the month of November. Over the years leading performers including Badshah, Farhan Akhtar Shankar Mahadevan, Arijit Singh, Sunidhi Chauhan, Lucky Ali, Nucleya, Bombay Basement have performed in the annual fests making them the biggest cultural-management festivals in eastern India. Beyond these cultural extravaganzas the student communities and committees of the university organise unique events like Gramotsava, the annual rural marketing and awareness fair in rural areas of Odisha and Prativa, the annual sports meet for underprivileged school going students of nearby villages.

== Notable people ==
=== Notable alumni ===
- Amar Patnaik, former Bureaucrat & Member of Parliament (Rajya Sabha)
- Amitabh Shukla, Indian Film Editor
- Gitanjali J Angmo, Indian educator

=== Honorary doctorates ===
To honour and recognise outstanding contributions to various fields the XIM University, regularly felicitates honorary doctorate degrees to multiple impacts makers. Some of the honorary doctorate recipients from the university are as follows:

- Adi Godrej, chairman, Godrej Group
- Sanjiv Goenka, chairman, RP Sanjiv Goenka Groups
- Sanjiv Mehta, MD & chairman, HUL India

== See also ==
- List of Jesuit sites
