= OCAC =

OCAC may refer to:

- Overseas Community Affairs Council, Republic of China (Taiwan)
- Oklahoma Collegiate Athletic Conference
- Oregon College of Art & Craft
- Organization of Central Asian Cooperation
- Oxford City Athletic Club
- Odisha Computer Application Centre
- Old Catholic Apostolic Church
