= Thinlas Chorol =

Indian social entrepreneur (born 1981)

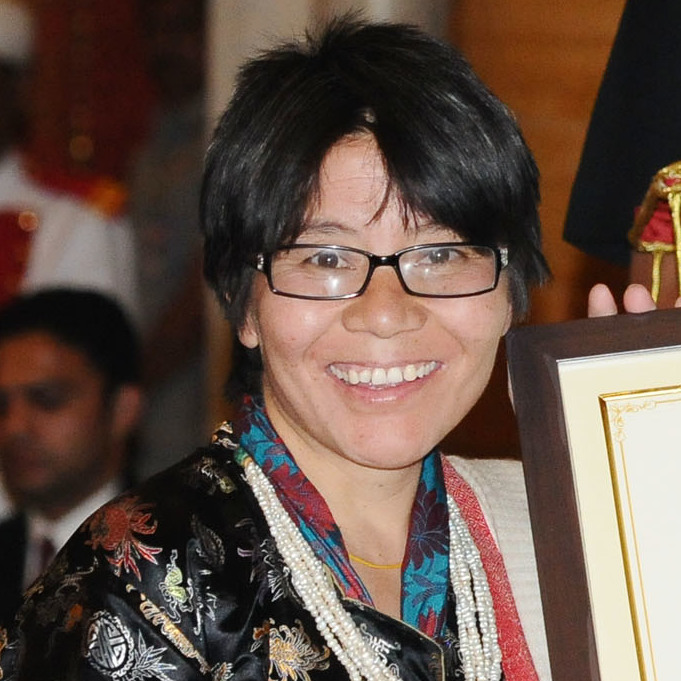
- Thinlas Chorol in 2017 receiving an award
- Born: 6 May 1981 (age 45); Takmachik, Leh district, Ladakh, India
- Occupations: Social entrepreneur Trekking guide Writer
- Spouse: Lars Lidström

Thinlas Chorol (born 6 May 1981) is a social entrepreneur and writer from Ladakh, India. She founded the Ladakhi Women's Travel Company and has written articles on tourism in Ladakh and other issues.

She first gained notability when she, in her early twenties, started working as a trekking guide in the otherwise heavily male-dominated trekking industry in Ladakh in northern India.

== Early life ==
=== Childhood ===
Chorol was born in the small village of Takmachik in the mountain region Ladakh. Both her parents were farmers and along with school she spent much of her childhood helping with animals and farming. Her mother died at an early age, her father remarried, and Chorol grew up with her father, stepmother and seven siblings. She got accustomed to spending time in the mountains from going with her father to tend the family's animals in the high pastures. She went in the fear that something might happen to him if he went alone.

=== SECMOL ===
After completing her 10th class education, Chorol was accepted as a student at the SECMOL Alternative Institute near Ladakh's main city, Leh. While at SECMOL, she went on trekking expeditions with some of the foreign volunteers. On an early trek, the local villagers spoke to her in English since they assumed no Ladakhi women would ever work as a trekking guide. She also tried to find work as a guide with some of the local trekking agencies, but was often rejected for being a woman. In 2004 she joined SECMOL's own travel agency, "Around Ladakh with Students," ALS. There were other women working in ALS, but at the time, they only guided monastery and cultural tours.

=== Education ===
Chorol did her primary schooling in Takmachik, and secondary schooling from Domkhar, a neighboring village. While at SECMOL, Chorol completed her 11th and 12th standard education. After this, she started a correspondence college course for a B.A. in Arts. Along with this, she also took courses in mountaineering at Nehru Institute of Mountaineering and wilderness training at National Outdoor Leadership School.

== Career ==
=== Tourism ===
When ALS stopped doing treks for individuals and small groups, Chorol continued to work freelance. After completing various courses in mountaineering and other outdoor activities, she started to get more and more work as a freelance trekking guide, and tourist started to ask for female guides.

In 2009 she founded the "Ladakhi Women's Travel Company" in order to bring more women into the field, and to promote ecotourism in Ladakh. And through Homestays, expose women in the village to people and cultures they would normally not have as much contact with. On the company's website, it promotes itself as being "The first female owned and operated travel company in Ladakh". In order to train more guides to come into the Ladakhi trekking industry, the company bring younger, inexperienced women along as porters.

In January 2014, Chorol was awarded the Indian Merchants Chamber Ladies' Wing's Jankidevi Bajaj Puraskar, an awards that is give in recognition of outstanding Indian female rural entrepreneurs. The award was presented to Chorol in Mumbai by founder and chairperson of the Arghyam Trust, Rohini Nilekani. Chorol is the first person in the tourism category, the first Ladakhi, and the first women from the Indian state of Jammu and Kashmir to receive the award that was first conferred in 1993.

In January 2015, the Indian news website, The Weekend Leader in collaboration with Vellore Institute of Technology named Chorol their "Person of the year" 2014. She was selected for her contributions to the development of tourism in Ladakh and for creating job opportunities for Ladakhi women. The award was presented to her at a ceremony at VIT university on 11 March 2015 by K. Vijay Kumar, Special Security Adviser, Union Ministry of Home Affairs.

=== Women's empowerment ===
In 2014, Chorol cofounded the society "Ladakhi Women's Welfare Network" and became its first President. The society was set up to work for the welfare of women, to support the victims of crimes directed towards women and help educate them on their legal rights.

Her company, the "Ladakhi Women's Travel Company" uses mainly Homestays, a way to help women in the villages generate income for themselves.

=== Writing ===
In 2007, Chorol was awarded the "Sanjoy Ghosse Ladakh Women Writers' Award" by the non-governmental organization Charkha Development Communication Network. Her article "Beyond conventional tourism", about the impact of tourism in Ladakh has been published in the magazine Epilogue. And later, the magazine published her article, "A Trek Through Life" about her own experience from the village to becoming a trekking guide in an otherwise male dominated field.

In 2014, Chorol was also published in the Ladakhi magazine "Stawa", writing on the issue of rape in Ladakh and the effects of the Ladakhi caste system.

== Honors ==
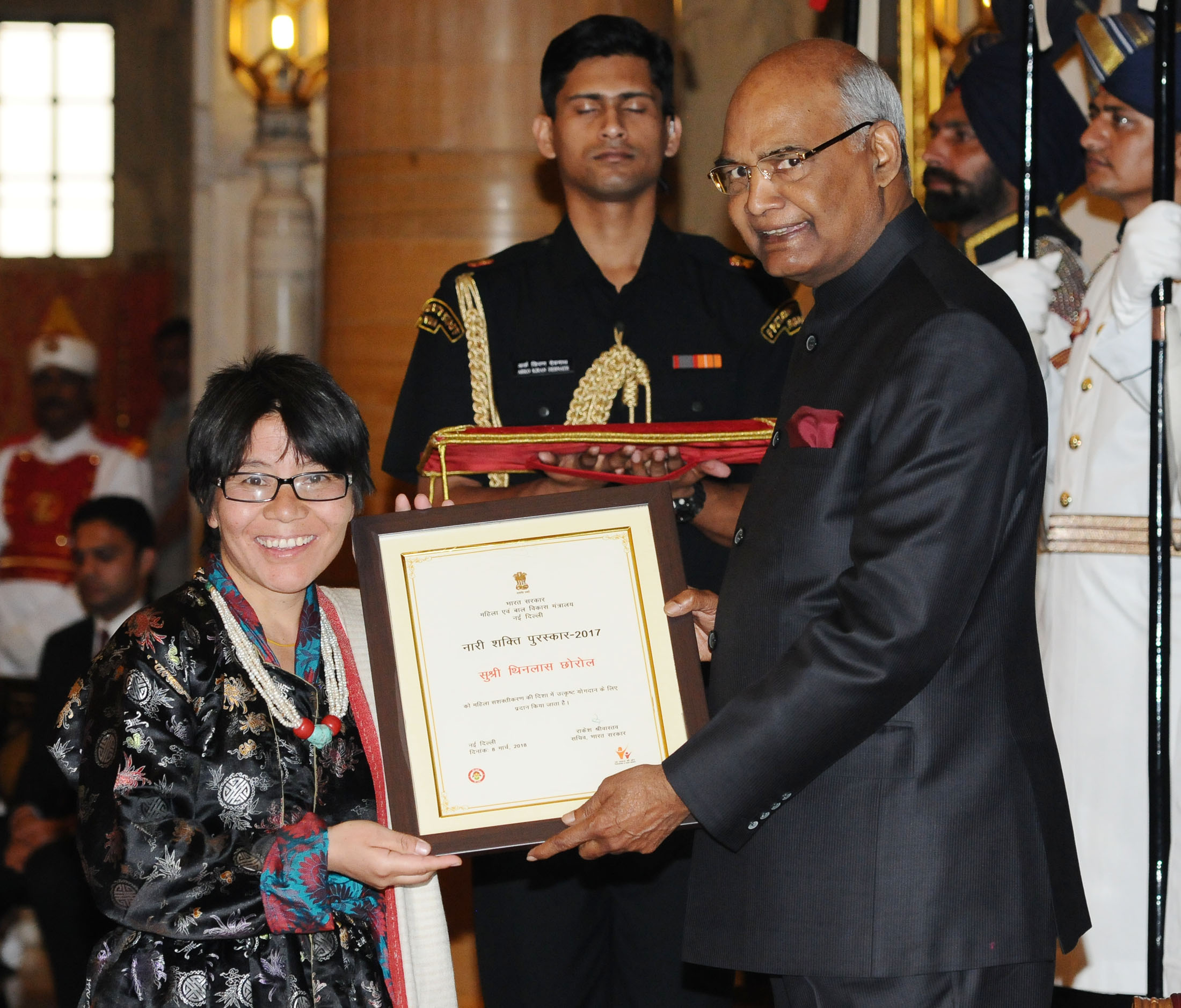
President Ram Nath Kovind presenting the Nari Shakti Puruskar for the year 2017 to Ms. Thinlas Chorol, on 8 march 2018 at Rashtrapati Bhavan, in New Delhi

- 8 March 2018: Nari Shakti Puraskar (Women Power Award), highest civilian award for women in India.
