= Sonam Wangchuk =

Indian engineer and environmentalist (born 1966)

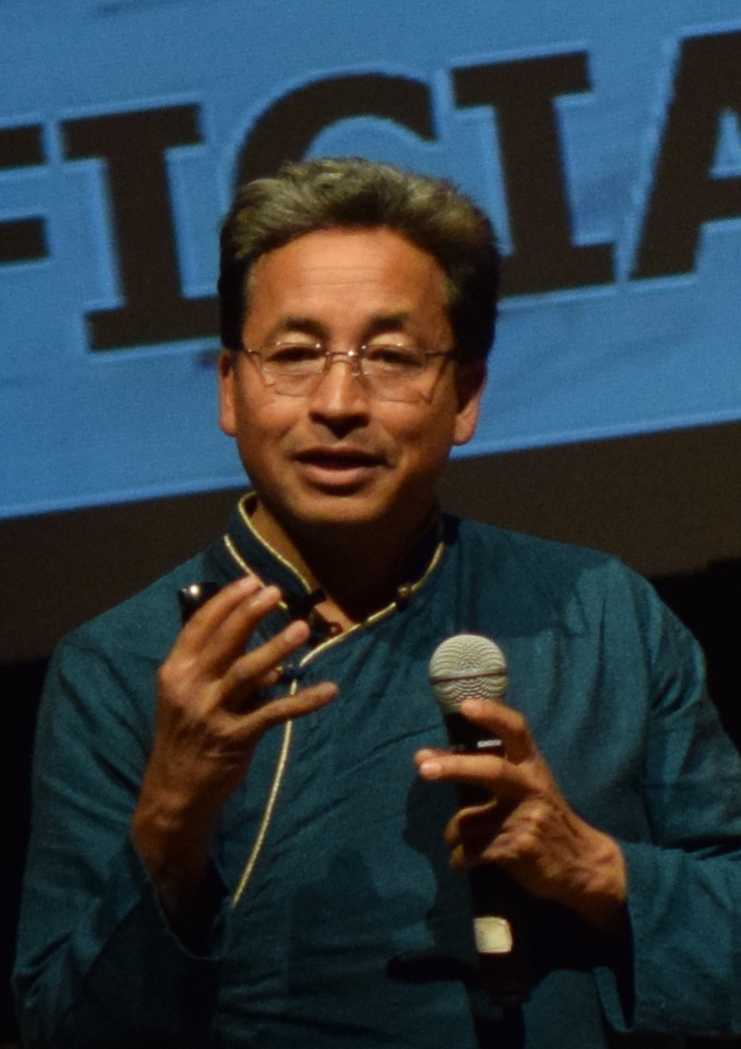
- Wangchuk in 2017
- Born: 1966 (age 59–60); Alchi, Jammu and Kashmir, India (now in Ladakh, India)
- Education: NIT Srinagar (B.Tech.); CRAterre
- Occupations: Engineer; Educator
- Organization: Students' Educational and Cultural Movement of Ladakh
- Known for: Ice Stupa, SECMOL
- Spouses: Rebecca Norman (m. 1996, divorced); Gitanjali J Angmo
- Awards: List: Real Heroes Award (2008); Fred M. Packard Award (2016); Rolex Awards for Enterprise (2016); Global Award for Sustainable Architecture (2017); Ramon Magsaysay Award (2018)

Sonam Wangchuk (born 1966) is an Indian engineer, educator, and activist. He is the founding director of the Students' Educational and Cultural Movement of Ladakh (SECMOL), which was founded in 1988 by a group of students who struggled with the public education system. He also designed the eco-friendly SECMOL campus, which is powered by solar energy.

Born in Ladakh in 1966, he was initially taught at home before taking up formal school education. He completed B.Tech. in mechanical engineering from the National Institute of Technology Srinagar in 1987 and later obtained a diploma in earthen architecture from CRAterre in 2011.

Wangchuk, along with his brother and a few friends, founded SECMOL in 1988. In 1994, SECMOL launched "Operation New Hope" in collaboration with the education department of the state government to bring reforms in the government school system. Wangchuk had served in various governmental advisory roles pertaining to education. In 2013, he developed the new "Ice Stupa technique" to build artificial glaciers, which are used for storing winter water in a cone-shaped ice heap. Along with Gitanjali J Angmo, he later co-founded the Himalayan Institute of Alternatives Ladakh. Wangchuk has received several awards, including the Global Award for Sustainable Architecture (2017), Fred M. Packard Award (2016), and Ramon Magsaysay Award (2018).

During the Ladakh protests in 2021, Wangchuk attempted to go on a hunger strike demanding increased autonomy and statehood for Ladakh. He went on a hunger strike in March 2024 and on a march to Delhi in October 2024 advocating for the same cause. He was arrested in September 2025 under the National Security Act after being accused of inciting riots, and was later released in March 2026. Wangchuk began a hunger strike on 28 June in support of the Jantar Mantar protests, which called for accountability over the NEET 2026 Paper leak, and the resignation of Education Minister Dharmendra Pradhan. He ended the hunger strike on 23 July 2026, after 26 days, stating that the Central Government had assured him that concerns related to the NEET 2026 paper leak would be addressed.

== Early life and education ==
Sonam Wangchuk was born in 1966 in Uleytokpo in Leh district of the Indian state of Jammu and Kashmir (now in the Indian union territory of Ladakh) to Sonam Wangyal and Tsering Wangmo. He was home schooled by his mother until the age of nine. His father was a member of the Indian National Congress party.

Wangchuk's family moved to Srinagar in 1975, after his father became a minister in the Government of Jammu and Kashmir. He was enrolled at a school in Srinagar, and he could not understand the various languages taught there due to the lack of formal education until then. He later recalled this period as the darkest part of his life as he was misunderstood as being unintelligent. Unable to bear this, in 1977, at the age of 12, he escaped alone to Delhi, where he personally pleaded his case for admission to the principal of a Kendriya Vidyalaya.

Wangchuk completed his B.Tech. in mechanical engineering from National Institute of Technology Srinagar (then Regional Engineering College) in 1987. He later studied earthen architecture at CRAterre in Grenoble, France, in 2011.

== Career ==
Wangchuk, along with his brother and a few friends, founded the Students' Educational and Cultural Movement of Ladakh (SECMOL) in 1988. A large proportion of students from Ladakh failed their board exams as they were often conducted in the English and Urdu languages, while they often knew only Ladakhi or Tibetan. Hence, after experimenting with school reforms at the Government High School at Suspol, SECMOL launched "Operation New Hope" in 1994 in collaboration with the education department of the Government of Jammu and Kashmir. The project was aimed at revamping the education system to make government schools more functional and effective.

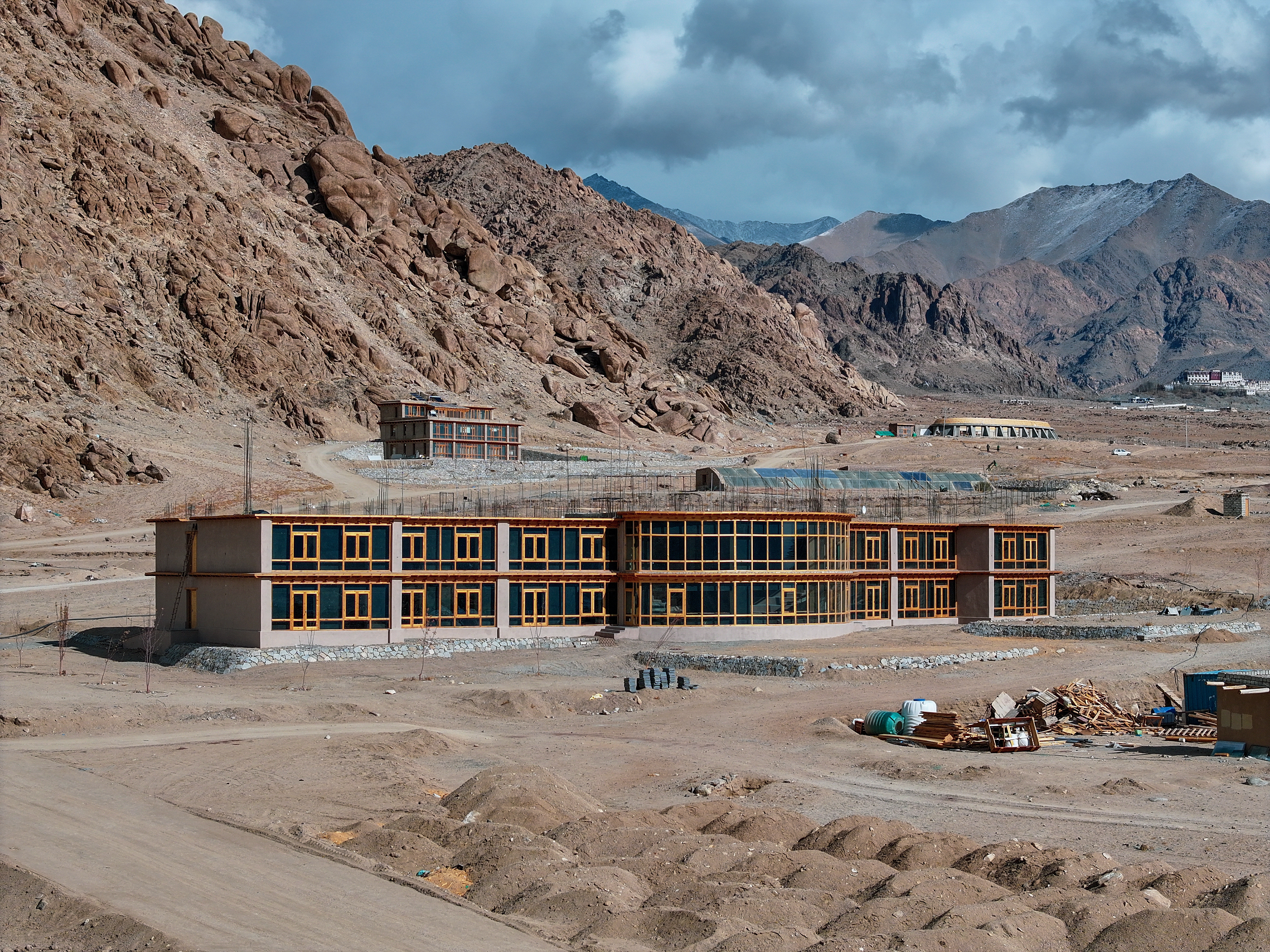
Himalayan Institute of Alternatives in Ladakh

Wangchuk founded and worked as the editor of the print magazine, Ladags Melong, from June 1993 to August 2005. In 2001, he was appointed to be an advisor for education by the Ladakh Autonomous Hill Development Council (LAHDC). In 2002, he co-founded the Ladakh Voluntary Network, a network of Ladakhi non-governmental organisations in the Ladakh region, along with the heads of such organisations, and served in its executive committee as the secretary until 2005. In 2004, he was appointed to the drafting committee of the Ladakh 2025 vision document commissioned by the LAHDC and was in charge of the formulation of the policy on education and tourism. In 2005, he was appointed as a member in the National Governing Council for Elementary Education in the Ministry of Human Resource Development of the Government of India. From 2007 to 2010, he worked as an education advisor for Mellemfolkeligt Samvirke, a Danish NGO working to support the Nepali Ministry of Education.

In 2013, Wangchuk was appointed to the Jammu and Kashmir State Board of School Education. In 2014, he was appointed to the expert panel formed for framing the state education policy. In 2016, Wangchuk initiated a project called FarmStays Ladakh, which was aimed at providing accommodation for tourists in the households of Ladakh, mostly run by women. The project was officially inaugurated by Chetsang Rinpoche on 18 June 2016. In 2017, Wangchuk co-founded the Himalayan Institute of Alternatives Ladakh (HIAL), along with Gitanjali J Angmo. In an interview in 2024, Wangchuk stated that his motivation for starting the institute stemmed from his desire to address the educational and developmental challenges specific to Ladakh's unique geographical and cultural context. The institute provided higher education and vocation skills to youth.

== Works and innovations ==
=== Sustainable buildings ===
Wangchuk has helped design and construct several passive solar mud buildings in mountain regions such as Ladakh, Sikkim, and Nepal. These buildings, often constructed with locally sourced earthen materials, employ principals of orientation towards the Sun, thermal mass, thermal insulation, and solar gain to reduce conventional heating requirements in cold climates, and help maintain warmer temperatures during cold winters without active temperature control. The SECMOL campus is built using rammed earth technique, and utilises passive heating. The classrooms, meeting halls, and student accommodations is largely powered by solar energy. It won the International Terra Award for the best building in July 2016 at the 12th World Congress on Earthen Architecture in Lyon.

=== Ice Stupa ===
In late 2013, Wangchuk built an artificial glacier using the "Ice Stupa" technique developed by him. These cone-shaped ice heaps were used to store stream water during the winters and release the water during late spring as they start melting, which is used for agriculture. He developed this solution while researching to resolve the water crisis faced by the farmers of Ladakh during the months of April and May before the natural glacial melt waters start flowing. In February 2014, he built a two-storey prototype, which could store roughly 150,000 L (33,000 imp gal; 40,000 US gal) of water.

In late 2016, Wangchuk was invited by the president of Pontresina, a municipality in the Engadine valley, Switzerland to build Ice Stupas to add to their winter tourism attractions. In October 2016, Wangchuk and his team travelled to the Swiss Alps to work on building the first Ice Stupa in Europe along with Swiss authorities. Several ice stupas were built in Ladakh later, including a 10 ft (3.0 m)-high ice stupa built by local sculptors in Ladakh in February 2018.

=== Siphon technique ===
In 2015, a landslide blocked the course of the Phugtal river in Zanskar and resulted in the formation of a large lake, which became a threat to the downstream population. Wangchuk proposed to use a siphon technique to drain the lake instead of the planned blasting of the lake. His suggestion was not accepted, and on 7 May 2015, the lake burst into a flash flood which destroyed several bridges, buildings, and inundated fields downstream.

In 2016, Wangchuk proposed the idea as a means of disaster mitigation at high-altitude glacial lakes. He was invited by the Government of Sikkim to apply the siphon technique for another dangerous lake in the state. In September 2016, he led a three-week expedition to the South Lhonak Lake in North-West Sikkim, which had been declared dangerous for the last few years. His team camped for two weeks at the lake, installing the first phase of a siphoning system to drain the lake to a safer level until other measures were taken up.

=== Mobile solar-powered tents ===
In February 2021, Wangchuk developed solar-powered tents for the Indian Army. Each such tent was capable of accommodating ten soldiers. According to Wangchuk, he came up with the idea when he learnt that around 50,000 Indian soldiers were working in cold weather conditions in high-altitude areas. The tents trap the heat energy during the daytime and utilises it to keep them warm during night.

== Politics ==
In 2013, after requests from students community of Ladakh, Wangchuk helped launch the New Ladakh Movement, a social campaign aimed at sustainable education, environment and economy in Ladakh. While it initially aimed to enter mainstream politics, it later remained as a non-political social movement.

In June 2020, in response to the India-China border skirmishes, Wangchuk appealed to the Indian people to use their "wallet power" and boycott Chinese products. The appeal received widespread media coverage and garnered support from prominent celebrities.

=== Ladakh autonomy protests ===
On 26 January 2023, to highlight the effects of climate change on the fragile ecosystem of Ladakh and to demand its protection under the Sixth Schedule of the Indian Constitution, Wangchuk attempted to go on a hunger strike at the Khardung La pass. While Wangchuk claimed that he was placed under a house arrest, the Ladakh police denied the charges and stated that he had not been given permission to go to Khardung La due to cold temperatures (less than −40 °C (−40 °F)) being unsuitable for a fast.

In March 2024, he began a 21-day hunger strike demanding statehood for Ladakh, and constitutional safeguards for the protection of Ladakh from industrial and mining lobbies. During the protests, a widely circulated video alleged that Wangchuk had expressed support for China. However, Wangchuk stated that the clip omitted the context over which the remarks were made, and they were intended as a warning about the consequences of alienating border communities. While he denied making any statement in support of China, he stated that "When China invades, the Ladakhis stop them with their lives. But if the Indian government doesn't do anything for us, then the next time they arrive, we will not stop them; we will show them the way. Why should we give up our lives when there is no protection for us?".

On 30 September 2024, he began a march by foot from Ladakh to Delhi to press on his demands. Wangchuk and his supporters were detained by Delhi Police at the Singhu border on 1 October and were released the next day.

==== Riots and arrest ====
On 24 September 2025, a protest in Leh led to the Bharatiya Janata Party office being torched and the premises of the LAHDC being vandalised. In the ensuing crackdown, police opened fire on the protestors, killing four civilians and injuring dozens more. A curfew was imposed in the city, the internet services were subsequently suspended, and mass arrests were made. The Ministry of Home Affairs blamed Wangchuk for inciting the protests. Wangchuk denied the allegations and said that the protests were a reflection of people's frustrations with the government. He had earlier appealed for peace when the violence had first broken out.

Two days later, Wangchuk was detained by the police led by Ladakh's Director General of Police (DGP), under the provisions of the National Security Act (NSA). The authorities moved him a prison in Jodhpur. The Home Ministry later revoked the FCRA licence of SECMOL and subsequently, the Central Bureau of Investigation opened an inquiry on HIAL. Wangchuk's wife, Angmo, claimed that the DGP of Ladakh accused Wangchuk of having "Pakistani links" because she and Wangchuk had attended a Himalayan Climate Convention in Pakistan in February 2025. The event had been organised by the United Nations and Dawn Media, which had earlier been banned by the Government of India for publishing anti-India content.

Angmo further stated that she was given no information about Wangchuk's health or condition, and the authorities refused to allow her to speak with him. On 2 October, she filed a habeas corpus petition before the Supreme Court, challenging Wangchuk's arrest. On 24 November, the Supreme Court adjourned the case to 8 December, and later posted it for hearing on 29 January 2026. Wangchuk was released on 14 March 2026 after the Home Ministry revoked his detention under the NSA.

=== Delhi protests ===
In May 2026, the Cockroach Janta Party (CJP) was formed, in response to the remarks made by the Chief Justice of India, Surya Kant, who used the terms "parasites" and "cockroaches" to describe a section of unemployed youth while reprimanding a lawyer over a plea. Wangchuk supported the CJP and described himself as an "honorary cockroach".

On 28 June 2026, Wangchuk went on a hunger strike in support of the CJP-organised protests at Jantar Mantar, New Delhi, demanding the resignation of Union Education Minister, Dharmendra Pradhan, over the NEET 2026 Paper leak and CBSE On-Screen Marking irregularity. He was supported by several prominent people including former Chief Minister of Jammu and Kashmir, Omar Abdullah, who compared his hunger strike with the 2011 Indian anti-corruption movement and demanded the central government to start talks with Wangchuk. On 18 July, acting on the orders of the Delhi High Court, Wangchuk was forcibly removed from the protest site by the police and taken to Safdarjung Hospital. He ended his hunger strike after 26 days, on 23 July 2026, after the government assured him no legal action would be taken against protesters rallying at Jantar Mantar site, stating that he also wanted to avert "possible violence". He had earlier stated that he had lost 11 kg (24 lb) due to the fasting.

== Personal life ==
Wangchuk married Rebecca Norman in 1996. Norman was an American educator, who worked with Wangchuk at SECMOL. Wangchuk later married Gitanjali Angmo.

== Awards and honours ==
Sonam Wangchuk awards
Year	Award/honour	Entity/organisation	Ref.
2018	Ramon Magsaysay Award	Ramon Magsaysay Award Foundation	
2018	Honorary D.Litt	Symbiosis International University	
2018	Eminent Technologist of the Himalayan Region	IIT Mandi	
2017	Honor Award	Indians for Collective Action, San Francisco	
2017	Men of the Year Award, Social Entrepreneur of the Year	GQ	
2017	Global Award for Sustainable Architecture	UNESCO	
2017	State Award for outstanding environmentalist	Government of Jammu and Kashmir	
2016	Rolex Awards for Enterprise	Rolex	
2016	Fred M. Packard Award	International Union for Conservation of Nature	
2008	Real Heroes Award	CNN-IBN	
2004	Green Teacher Award	Sanctuary Asia	
2002	Fellowship for Social Entrepreneurship	Ashoka	
2001	Man of the Year	The Week	
1996	Governor's Medal for educational reform in Ladakh region	Government of Jammu and Kashmir	

== See also ==
- Anna Hazare – Indian activist (born 1937)
- Rajiv Goswami – Indian activist (1971–2004)
- Mandal Commission protests of 1990 – Protest against reservation in India
