= Gitanjali J Angmo =

Indian social entrepreneur, and educator

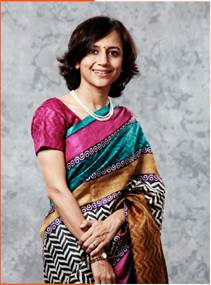
- Born: Gitanjali Jain Bhattacharje; 1972 or 1973 (age 53–54); Balasore, Odisha, India
- Education: Xavier Institute of Management, Bhubaneswar (MBA)
- Occupations: Social entrepreneur, and educator
- Spouse: Sonam Wangchuk
- Children: 1
- Honours: Women Transforming India (2022)
- Website: gitanjali.in

Gitanjali Jain Angmo (née Bhattacharje) is an Indian social entrepreneur, and educator, known for her work in poor education and community development in Ladakh. She received the Women Transforming India Award by the Government of India for her contributions to education and community development.

== Early life and education ==
Gitanjali was born in Balasore, Odisha in a Punjabi Jain family. She pursued a graduation in physics from Fakir Mohan University and then a Master of Business Administration (MBA) with a focus on Marketing and Finance from Xavier Institute of Management, Bhubaneswar (XIMB).

== Career ==
=== Corporate and entrepreneurial ventures ===
Gitanjali had a career in the corporate sector, before founding businesses like Pushan and Shanghai Power Projects Ltd. She also established Helios Books, Aum Hospitals, AUM Trust, Love Your Liver Foundation, and Transform India, focusing on education, healthcare, and wellness.

=== Himalayan Institute of Alternatives, Ladakh (HIAL) ===
In 2017, Gitanjali co-founded HIAL with her husband Sonam Wangchuk. HIAL aims to provide an alternative model of higher education for mountain communities.

=== Advisory roles and recognition ===
Gitanjali has served as an advisor to the Maharashtra International Education Board (MIEB) and has headed a Cambridge-affiliated school in Chennai.

In 2022, she received the Women Transforming India Award by the Government of India through NITI Aayog for her contributions to education and community development.

== Personal life ==
She is married to Sonam Wangchuk.

She has studied Sri Aurobindo's philosophy, the Vedas, and the Upanishads. She is also a trained ballerina, Odissi dancer, and karate practitioner.
