= Land of Widows =

2010 film by Aarti Shrivastava

- Directed by: Aarti Shrivastava
- Written by: Aarti Shrivastava
- Produced by: Media for social Impact, Bhaumik Sampat, Abhishek Awasthi
- Cinematography: Mayank Tripathi
- Edited by: Pranav Patel
- Music by: Daniel Arlington
- Release date: November 2011
- Running time: 21 minutes
- Country: India
- Language: English

Land of Widows a 21-minute Indian documentary film directed by Aarti Shrivastava. The film focuses on the unsustainable working conditions of mine workers in the state of Rajasthan, India. Set in the Bhilwara district of Rajasthan this film captures the exploitation the workers have to go through on a daily basis to work in illegal mines for a ‘dollar a day’. Blending investigative journalism with helplessness and dark humour, the film tells the stories of average sandstone miners victimized by corporate greed and political corruption. It examines how sandstone mining has affected the local communities and also people occupied with this occupation. Despite stone mining's links to several occupational diseases such as psychoneurosis, silicosis, tuberculosis, asbestosis and asthma, abject poverty keeps driving villagers in many parts of the state to illegal mining. More than 70 men from 60 families have died in the last few years of silicosis caused by inhalation of dust containing free crystalline silica. Their men were all mine workers employed in illegal stone quarries that have mushroomed over the past 10 years across the state thanks to record demand for sandstone, marble and other stones as people across the country built homes, offices and malls.

The film is a hitchhiker's journey through the labyrinthine universe of Democracy, as it exists in its lowest unit level – the Indian village. It showcases that death has lost its sting in parts of Rajasthan. Out there, they call it, not without a tinge of sarcasm, the land of widows. Penury is more horrible than death. They don't want to see their children cry loud for a piece of bread. They are aware that mining will take their life one day, but poverty will take no time to take their children away from them.

This village depicted in the film, Sriji Ka Kheda is meant to serve as a pastiche for mining villages in most parts of India. Shrivastava examines stories of struggle and visions of hope to illustrate the complex issues that are threatening the future of Indian mine workers and their families.

== Reviews ==
"Treating a major social issue sensitively is an art. A very good attempt by Aarti. I recommend it strongly and definitely give it a thumbs-up." - Abbas Arnaout, Director – Aljazeera International Documentary Film Festival.

"A side effect of a know problem remained unknown until the completion of this documentary. A piece of knowledge and respect." - Alberto Meroni, Film Director & Author

"This is an eye-opener. It is a must-see documentary if you really want to know what’s going on in the world around you. It has opened my eyes, and it will open yours." - Hussein Hemayed, Television Director – Lebnon

"Something you shouldn’t miss" - Elisa Melzer, Director – Bollywood & Beyond, Indian Film Festival of Germany

"Interesting and touching documentary that describes a sad reality" - Selvaggia Velo, Director – River to River Film Festival

== Awards and recognitions ==
- Best Documentary Film 10th IDPA Awards for Excellence 2012
- Official Nomination 7th Al-Jazeera International Documentary Film Festival Doha 2011
- Best Documentary Film 6th CMS Vatavaran Environment and Wildlife Film Festival Delhi 2011
- Official Nomination 8th Indian Film Festival Bollywood and Beyond Stuttgart 2011
