= Stanzin Dorjai =

Indian filmmaker

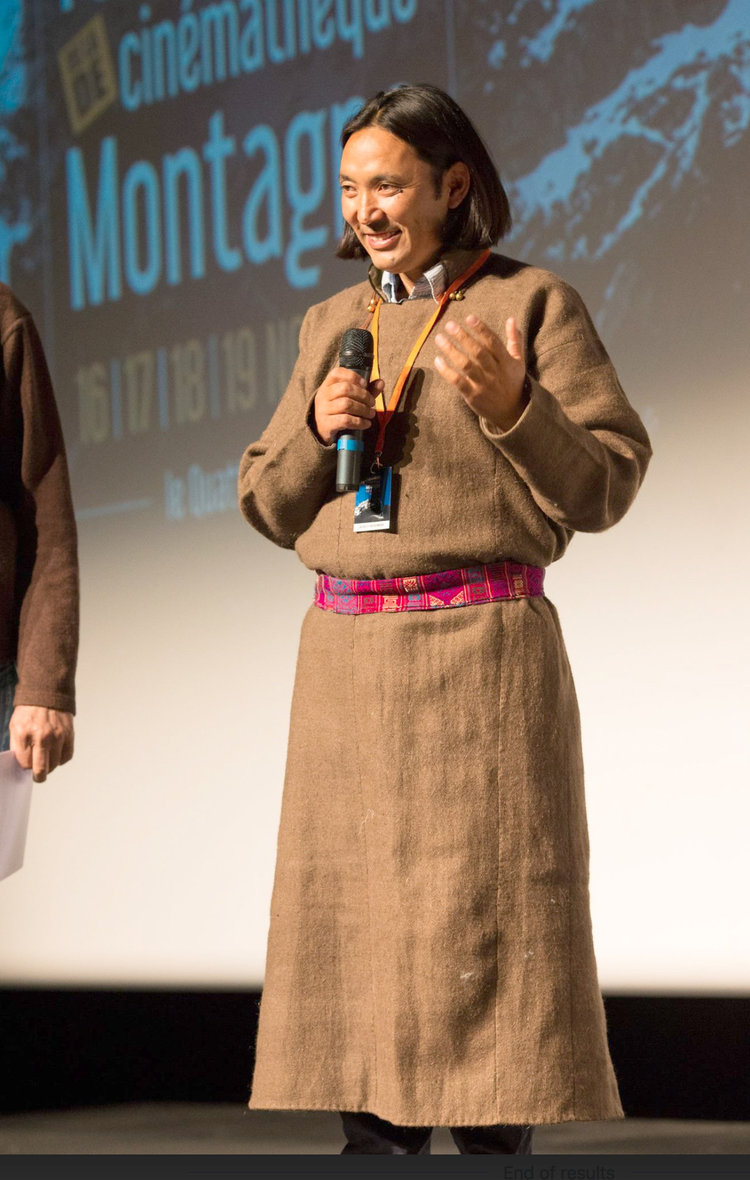

Stanzin Dorjai is an Indian documentary filmmaker from Gya in Ladakh, India. He has won many film festival awards for his film The Shepherdess of the Glaciers.

== Biography ==
Dorjai was born in the village of Gya in Ladakh, in the high Indian Himalayas. He had a semi-nomadic childhood, spending half of the month tending his family’s herd of yaks and cashmere goats, while attending school during the other half. His father died when Dorjai was very young, and he grew up with his mother and four elder siblings. During his upbringing in Gya, he did not have many opportunities to watch documentary films.

In 1995, unable to pass the necessary standardized tests to complete high school, Dorjai began attending an alternative school, SECMOL (Students Educational and Cultural Movement of Ladakh), where he learnt more about the visual medium. There it was able to watch more documentaries, and meet people from the film industry, including Indian filmmaker Lena Tace and Lars Lidstrom from Sweden, as well as his mentor, Mumbai based Director Rahul Randaive. In 2005, Dorjai received his Bachelor of Arts degree from Jammu University.

In 2000, Dorjai worked as editor, executive producer and cinematographer of Tsondus, which is his first feature film. In 2006, he founded the Himalayan Film House in Leh, wherein he has directed and produced feature films and documentaries on regional, national and international issues. In 2007, Mig choo became the first film made by the studio.

Dorjai was chosen as the District Youth Icon (Leh) by the Election Commission of India, during the Lok Sabha Elections, 2019.

== Filmography ==
Year	Films	Roles
2006	Hemis	Cinematographer, Editor
2006	Prosperity and Youth Enterprise	Director, Cinematographer, Editor
2006	Mig choo	Co-Director with Zhanpo (Ladakh), Producer, Cinematographer, Editor
2006	Forever Sunshine	Co-Cinematographer
2007	Development Redefined	Director, Cinematographer, Editor
2008	Living with Change	Director, Cinematographer, Editor
2008	Root and Lineage	Director, Cinematographer, Editor
2008	Khorwa	Co-Director with Zhanpo (Ladakh), Producer, Cinematographer, Editor
2010	Behind the Mirror	Co-Director with Christiane Mordelet, Producer, Cinematographer, Scriptwriter
2013	Jungwa: The Broken Balance	Co-Director with Christiane Mordelet, Producer, Cinematographer, Scriptwriter
2015	Shepherdess of the Glaciers	Co-Director with Christiane Mordelet, Producer, Cinematographer, Scriptwriter
2016	Perfectly Twisted	Director, Cinematographer, Scriptwriter
2016	Lighting up the Himalayas	Director, Cinematographer, Scriptwriter

== Awards ==
The Shepherdess of the Glaciers

- Grand Prize, Banff Mountain Film Festival (2016)
- Best Director, Mountain International Film Festival Autrans (2016)
- Grand Prize, Aaint Etienne, Festival Curieux Voyageuers (2016)
- The Jury Award for Runner Up Film South Asia (2017)
- Audience Choice Award, Mountain International Film Festival Autrans (2016)
- Best Film on Mountain Culture, India Mountaineering Foundation (2016)
- Audience Choice Best Documentary Aanta Fe, Independent Film Festival (2017)
- Best Nature and Environment Award, Ushuaia TV, Mountain International Film Festival Autrans(2016)
- Grand Prix, Le Grand Bivouac, International Film Festival, Albertville (2016)
- Best Documentary Award, Grand Prize Cinemathequemontage (2016)
- Visions du Reel Festival International de Cinema, Nyon, Doc Outlook International Market (2016)
- Jury Award, IDSFFk 9th International Documentary and Short Film Festival of Kerala (2016)
- Jury Award International Film Festival Explorimage (2016)
- Official Selection DIFF, Dharamsala Film Festival (2016)
- Official Selection Peace Builder Film Festival (2016)

Jungwa, The Broken Balance

- Special Jury Mention, Banff Mountain Film Festival (2014)
- Snow Leopard Jury Award, Ladakh International Film Festival (2013)
- Grand Prize Award, Explorimages, (2012)
- Audience Choice Award, Explorimages, (2012)
- Special Jury Award, 29th Mountain International Film Festival, Autrans (2012)

Behind the Mirror

- International Scientific Film Festival Award, Szolnok, Budapest, (2013)
- Snow Leopard Award, Special Jury Mention, Ladakh International Film Festival (2013)
