= Chewang Norphel =

Indian civil engineer from Ladakh (born 1935)

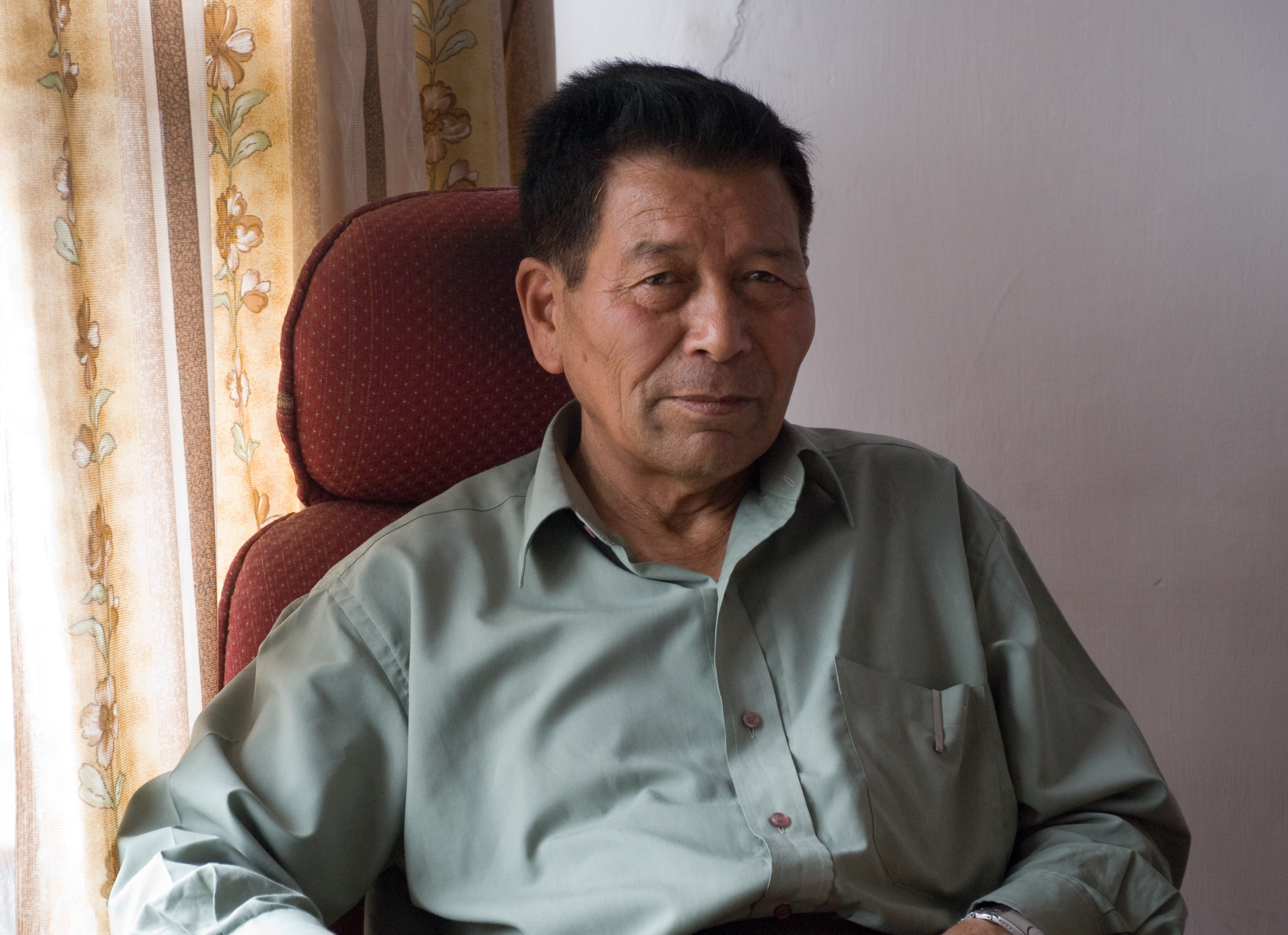
- Norphel in 2009
- Born: 1935 (age 90–91)
- Engineering career
- Discipline: Civil engineering
- Employer(s): Jammu and Kashmir rural development department
- Significant design: Water catchment; artificial glacier
- Awards: Padma Shri (2015)

Chewang Norphel (born 1935) is an Indian civil engineer from Ladakh, who has built 15 artificial glaciers. He has earned the title of Ice Man.

== Early life and career ==
Being from Leh, Norphel went to Amar Singh College in Srinagar as a student of science. He completed a diploma course in civil engineering from Lucknow in 1960. In June 1960, he joined the rural development department of Jammu and Kashmir in Ladakh as a civil engineer. He retired in 1995.

== Artificial Leh Nutrition Project, a non-governmental organisation, as project manager for watershed development.

Norphel noticed a small stream had frozen solid under the shade of a group of poplar trees, though it flowed freely elsewhere in his yard. He realized the reason for this phenomenon: the flowing water was moving too quickly to freeze, while the sluggish trickle of water beneath the trees was slow enough to freeze. Based on this, he created artificial glaciers by diverting a river into a valley, slowing the stream by constructing checks. The artificial glaciers increase the ground-water recharge, rejuvenating the spring and providing water for irrigation. He constructed them at lower elevations, so that they melt earlier, expanding the growing season.

By 2012, Norphel had built 12 artificial glaciers. Norphel's largest glacier is the one at the Phuktsey village. It is 1,000 ft long, 150 ft wide and 4 ft in depth. It can supply water for the entire village of 700 people and cost Rs 90,000 to make. Each artificial glacier can irrigate over 200 hectares of crops and feed over 300 families.

Documentary film-maker Aarti Shrivastava also directed a short film on his life titled White Knight, which was screened at film festivals in India and abroad.

== Awards ==
He is a recipient of the Jamnalal Bajaj Award in 2010. He was awarded Padma Shri, the fourth highest civilian award of India, in 2015.
