= Students' Educational and Cultural Movement of Ladakh =

Indian non-governmental organisation

Students' Educational and Cultural Movement of Ladakh (SECMOL)
- Type: Non-governmental organisation
- Founded: 1988
- Founder: Sonam Wangchuk
- Headquarters: Leh, Ladakh, India
- Website: www.secmol.org

The Students' Educational and Cultural Movement of Ladakh (SECMOL) is an Indian non-governmental organisation based in Leh, Ladakh, India.

== History ==
The Students' Educational and Cultural Movement of Ladakh (SECMOL) is an organisation founded in 1988 aimed at reforming the educational system of Ladakh, by a group of young Ladakhis returning from university who understood the problems of the younger generation with modern education, their lack of focus and the cultural confusion. Their activities include working to reform the government school system, helping village students in their education, awakening youth to the problems stemming from inappropriate and insensitive schooling, producing related videos and radio programmes, and designing and building solar-heated eco-friendly buildings.

== Phey campus ==
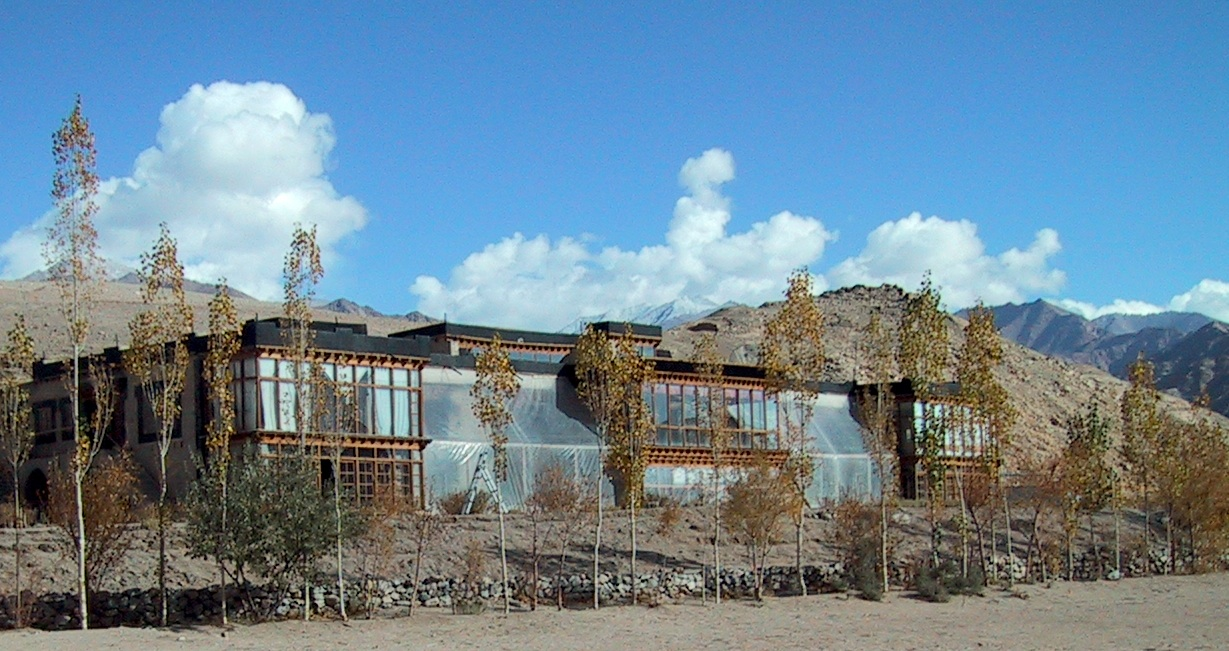
Main building SECMOL campus

SECMOL Campus is located near the village of Phey in the Indus valley 18 km from Leh. It was developed between 1994 and 1999 and was inaugurated in 1998 by the Dalai Lama.

Built using simple, low-cost traditional techniques, the campus now comprises three residential houses, 20 small "cell rooms" and a large school building, all solar heated. Part of SECMOL's work is to develop techniques that use alternative energy sources. Ladakh has over 300 sunny days per year and the sun is therefore a reliable source of energy and an alternative to fossil fuels. The campus is home to about 70 students and a few staff and volunteers, who live, work and study there. The campus is maintained, and to a large degree run, by the students themselves on a democratic basis.

== Notable alumni and staff ==
- Sonam Wangchuk, Founder
- Stanzin Dorjai, Filmmaker

== Bibliography ==
- Rewriting the Books in Ladakh
- Lesson from Leh son: Meet Ladakh's man of hope

== See also ==
- Green building
- Ice Stupa
- Ladakh
- Thinlas Chorol
- Tourism in Ladakh
