= Aarti Shrivastava =

Indian documentary filmmaker

- Born: 1983 (age 42–43); Nagpur, Maharashtra, India
- Education: Wilson College, Mumbai University
- Occupation: Director
- Notable work: Foresting Life

Aarti Shrivastava (born 1983) is a national award-winning Indian documentary filmmaker and Asia 21 IPRYLI Fellow based in Mumbai.

After graduating from Wilson College, Mumbai, she began a career as a news reporter working with CNBC. She subsequently worked as a researcher on an Australian Documentary based on the 2008 Mumbai attacks, before directing her two award-winning documentaries, Land of Widows and White Knight, which were well received in the international festival circuit including Official Nomination in 7th Aljazeera International Documentary Film Festival, Doha, 2011.

In 2013, she directed her third documentary Foresting Life which won the National Award. This documentary focuses on the life of Jadav Payeng who singlehandedly planted trees over the last 35 years and transformed a 1400-acre sandbar into a self-sustaining forest ecosystem.

She has been a jury member on various film festivals including the International Film Festival of India (Goa), Cebu International Documentary Film Festival, IDPA Awards for excellence, Jaipur, International Film Festival to name a few, is currently engaged in producing and directing a multi-year feature-length documentary project on Water crisis in India.

Besides managing the Humanity Watchdog Foundation, for which she had the idea while she was studying social entrepreneurship at Stanford University, she also manages production on commercial Bollywood film projects like Kick, My Name Is Khan, and reality show Sur Kshetra

== Filmography ==
- Kick (2014) (Executive Producer)
- Foresting life (2013) (Director)
- White Knight (Documentary) (2012) (Director)
- Land of widows (2011) (Director)
- My Name Is Khan (2010) (Production Executive)
- Kambakkht Ishq (2009) (Production Executive)

== Awards ==
- National Film Award for Best Film on Environment Conservation/Preservation
- Opening Film Water Doc Film Festival Canada 2013
- Official nomination 9th Al-Jazeera Documentary International Film Festival Doha 2013
- Official Selection Jaipur International Film Festival 2013
- Official Selection Reel Earth Environmental Film Festival
- Official Selection South Asian Film Festival Canada 2012
- Official Selection Colorado Film Festival 2013
- Special Mention Women Deliver Cinema Corner Conference
- Official Nomination 7th Al-Jazeera International Documentary Film Festival Doha 2011
- Livelihoods Award 6th CMS VATAVARAN Environment and Wildlife Film Festival Delhi 2011
