= CRAterre =

French research laboratory

CRAterre (International Centre on Earthen Architecture) is a research laboratory on earthen architecture founded in 1979. Based within the National Superior School of Architecture in Grenoble, France, it hosts a multidisciplinary team of researchers, professionals, lecturers and trainers to work on the dissemination of knowledge and know-how on raw earthen construction techniques in France and globally.

CRAterre has, since 1998, led the United Nations Educational, Scientific and Cultural Organization Chair “Earthen architecture, construction cultures and sustainable development”. The main objective of the Chair is to accelerate, on a global level, the dissemination of scientific and technical know-how on earthen architecture (rammed earth, cob, Wattle and daub, Adobe, etc.) in two areas: Environment and World Heritage and Environment, human settlements/housing.

CRAterre's scientific director, Patrice Doat, is known for his using of ecology to renew paradigms of architecture and teaching methods. His work through CRAterre is awarded a Global Award for Sustainable Architecture in 2016.

== Earthen Architecture Post-Master's degree (DSA) ==
Since 1984, CRAterre has provided a Post-Master's degree on earthen architecture, the DSA Earthen Architecture, a two-year programme leading to a National Specialised Diploma, conferred by the French Ministry of Culture and Communication. The three main axes of this training are:

- Heritage and conservation
- Building material
- Human settlement
