= Takmachik =

- Village
- Location in Ladakh, India Takmachik (India)
- Coordinates: 34.38244°N 76.76233°E
- Country: India
- Union Territory: Ladakh
- District: Sham
- Tehsil: Khalsi

Population (2011)
  - Total: 607
- Time zone: UTC+5:30 (IST)
- Census code: 946

Takmachik is a village in the Sham district of the Indian union territory of Ladakh. It is located in the Khalsi tehsil, around 14 km from the Khaltsi and 112 km west of the district headquarters Leh.

== Demographics ==
According to the 2011 census of India, Takmachik has 70 households. The effective literacy rate (i.e. the literacy rate of population excluding children aged 6 and below) is 65.36%.

Demographics (2011 Census)
	Total	Male	Female
Population	607	314	293
Children aged below 6 years	70	36	34
Scheduled caste	0	0	0
Scheduled tribe	606	313	293
Literates	351	204	147
Workers (all)	269	180	89
Main workers (total)	187	151	36
Main workers: Cultivators	120	116	4
Main workers: Agricultural labourers	33	16	17
Main workers: Household industry workers	12	5	7
Main workers: Other	22	14	8
Marginal workers (total)	82	29	53
Marginal workers: Cultivators	73	26	47
Marginal workers: Agricultural labourers	0	0	0
Marginal workers: Household industry workers	6	2	4
Marginal workers: Others	3	1	2
Non-workers	338	134	204

== Tourism ==
In August 2011, Tamakchik was formally launched as a tourist destination by the Ladakh Environment and Health Organization (LEHO). LEHO also held a workshop on Organic farming and Sustainable village Development to promote organic cultivation in the village.

Described as the first eco-model village of Ladakh, Tamachik is known for its authentic Ladakhi food and traditional culture. The Student Association for Village Environment (SAVE) -Takmachik is a local organization that maintains cleanliness and hygiene in the village.
