= Software Technology Parks of India =

Technology Park

- Abbreviation: STPI
- Formation: 1991; 35 years ago
- Headquarters: New Delhi
- Location: In all States of India
- Region served: India
- Director General: Arvind Kumar
- Parent organisation: Ministry of Electronics and Information Technology
- Website: stpi.in

Software Technology Parks of India (STPI) is an S&T autonomous society under Ministry of Electronics and Information Technology (MeitY) engaged in promoting IT/ ITES Industry, Innovation, R&D, Start-ups, Product/ IP creation in the field of emerging technologies like Internet of Things (IoT), Blockchain, Artificial Intelligence (AI), Machine Learning (ML), Computer Vision, Robotics, Augmented & Virtual Reality, Animation & Visual effect (AVGC), Data Science & Analytics for various domains like FinTech, Agritech, MedTech, Autonomous Connected Electric & Shared (ACES) Mobility, ESDM, Cyber Security, Gaming, Industry 4.0, Drone, Efficiency Augmentation, etc.

STPI was established in 1991 by the Ministry of Electronics and Information Technology with the objective of encouraging, promoting and boosting the export of software from India. STPI headquarters is located in New Delhi with over 60+ centres spread across the country.

== Overview ==
STPI provides infrastructure, skilling, mentoring, market connect and supports startups.

The exports clocked by STP-registered units stands at ₹4.21 lakh crore in 2019–2020. and it's estimated to have touched ₹2.49 lakh crore in H1 FY21.

The growth of STPI - Noida unit exporting IT/ITeS is ₹52,795 crores in FY 2019-20 which made Noida as the major IT hub of North India. STPI Noida registered unit's export have grown over 21 times from ₹2,450 crores in FY 1999–2000.

STPI registered unit's exports stand to ₹4,21,103 crore in 2019-20 from ₹52 crores in 1992–1993. In December 2022, Union Minister of State for Electronics and IT Rajeev Chandrasekhar, in a written reply to a question in Rajya Sabha informed that IT units registered with state-run Software Technology Parks of India (STPI) have exported software worth ₹6.29 lakh crore in 2021-22.

== Centres of Entrepreneurship ==
Domain centric Centre of Entrepreneurship are established in association with companies and academic institutions. A Blockchain CoE is set up in STPI incubation centre in Gurugram in year 2020.

- FinBlue at Chennai
- MOTION at Pune
- NEURON at Mohali
- Apiary at Gurugram
- IMAGE at Hyderabad
- MedTech CoE at Lucknow
- IoT OpenLab at Bengaluru
- Electropreneur Park at Bhubaneswar
- VARCoE at Bhubaneswar
- FabLab at Bhubaneswar
- National Data Repository at Bhubaneswar
- IoT in Agriculture CoE at Guwahati
- Animation CoE at Shillong
- Emerging Technologies – AR/VR CoE at Imphal

=== Electropreneur Park ===
STPI has established a joint venture to set up an 'Electropreneur Park' with the India Electronics and Semiconductor Association (IESA).This is aimed at supporting 50 startups working on electronics product designing and development over the next five years. The initiative is a subset of the Government's 'Make in India' mission, aligned with entrepreneurial and innovation focus. There are currently two Electropreneur parks in New Delhi & Bhubaneswar.

== India BPO Promotion Scheme ==
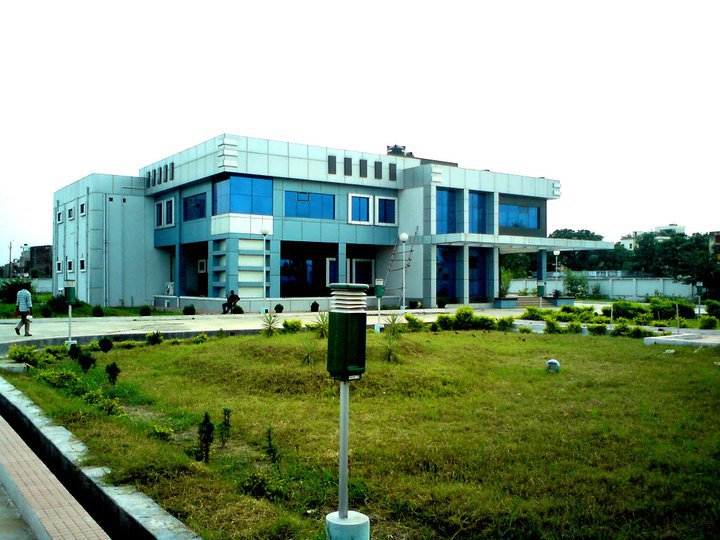
Software Technology Park of India, Patna

STPI envisaged under Digital India program launched the India BPO Promotion Scheme (IBPS). this scheme seek to incentivise establishment of 48,300 seats in respect of BPO/ITES operations across India. STPI is the nodal agency of this scheme under the Ministry of Electronics and Information Technology. Director General STPI has announced to launch 48,000 such seats across the country, with a target employment of 72,450 in the sector. The Government provides financial support of up to ₹1 lakh per seat under two plans—India BPO Promotion Scheme and North East BPO Promotion Scheme. The Scheme is distributed among each State in proportion of State's population with an outlay of ₹493 Crore. 39,390 employment reported as of April 2021 under the India BPO Promotion Scheme (IBPS).

Visakhapatnam has created 10,000 jobs under the India BPO Promotion Scheme (IBPS), Andhra Pradesh state got 13,792 seat, out of 48,300 seats in India.

== Organisation and administration ==
With nine jurisdictional directorates and 60 centres headed by Director general, STPI has its presence in pan-India to support IT/ITeS Industry.

STPI maintains internal engineering resources to provide consulting, training and implementation services. Services cover network design, system integration, installation, operations and maintenance of application networks and facilities in varied areas. The process development of STPI is in accordance to the Quality Management System, and adheres to ISO 9001 certification. The STP Scheme provides various benefits to the registered units, including 100% foreign equity, tax incentives, duty-free import, duty-free indigenous procurement, CST reimbursement, DTA entitlement, and deemed exporting.

== Role ==
STP units exported software and information technology worth ₹2.15 lakh crore in FY 2010–11. The state with the largest export contribution was Karnataka followed by Maharashtra, Tamil Nadu, Haryana and Telangana. STPI has a presence in many major cities of India including the cities of Bangalore, Chennai, Hyderabad, Trivandrum, Kanpur, Patna, Bhubaneswar, Kolkata, Mumbai, Nagpur, Warangal, Gandhinagar, Kakinada, Lucknow, Pune, Surat, Tirupati, Vijayawada and Visakhapatnam.

Besides regulating the STP scheme, STPI centers provide a variety of services including high-speed data communication, incubation facilities, consultancy, network monitoring, data centers and data hosting. STPI provides physical hosting for the National Internet Exchange of India.

The tax benefits under the Income Tax Act Section 10A applicable to STP units has expired since March 2011. While the Government has chosen not to extend the Sec 10A benefits against the demand by the IT units, most of the STP registered SME units will be affected, and now will have to pay income tax on profits earned from exports.

== Exports awards ==
STPI in association with Indian state governments provides Exports Awards.

== Exports by registered IT/ITeS units ==
Below is the State/UT-wise list of IT and ITeS export revenues from units registered under the Software Technology Parks of India (STPI) scheme for FY 2025–26, as presented to Parliament by the Ministry of Electronics and Information Technology.

S.No	State/UT	Revenue in IT exports (₹ Cr) (2025–26)
1	Karnataka	350,184.78
2	Maharashtra	162,594.11
3	Telangana	113,101.83
4	Tamil Nadu	60,591.28
5	Uttar Pradesh	28,442.69
6	Haryana	26,885.28
7	West Bengal	10,888.26
8	Andhra Pradesh	5,057.15
9	Odisha	3,492.42
10	Kerala	3,447.61
11	Gujarat	3,150.69
12	Rajasthan	2,072.05
13	Punjab	1,623.02
14	Madhya Pradesh	681.63
15	Delhi	652.08
16	Chandigarh	414.34
17	Puducherry	207.78
18	Meghalaya	147.54
19	Goa	81.21
20	Chhattisgarh	75.93
21	Uttarakhand	56.68
22	Jharkhand	30.41
23	Jammu & Kashmir	19.55
24	Assam	0.65
25	Bihar	—
26	Himachal Pradesh	—
27	Sikkim	—
India (Total)		773,898.97
