= Glacier growing =

Artificial process used for making glaciers

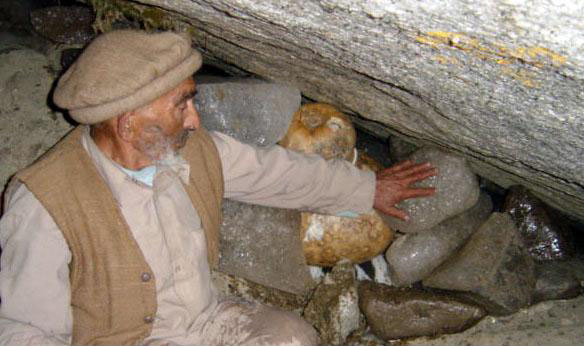
Planting a glacier seed

Glacier growing, artificial glaciation or glacier grafting, is a practice carried out in the Hindu Kush and Himalaya regions aimed at creating small new glaciers to increase water supply for crops and in some cases to sustain micro hydro power. In order to encourage the growth of a glacier, local farmers acquire ice from naturally occurring glaciers, and carry it to high altitude areas where the ice is put inside a small cave dug out in a scree-slope. Along with the ice other ingredients such as water, salt, sawdust, wheat husks and charcoal are also placed at the site. The use of glacier grafting is an old skill of the mountain farmers of Baltistan and Gilgit, where it is used for irrigation purposes since at least the 19th century. This technique was described by Lieutenant David Lockhart Robertson Lorimer (1876–1962) in the 1920s. Allegedly glacier grafting also has been used to block mountain passes.

== Background ==
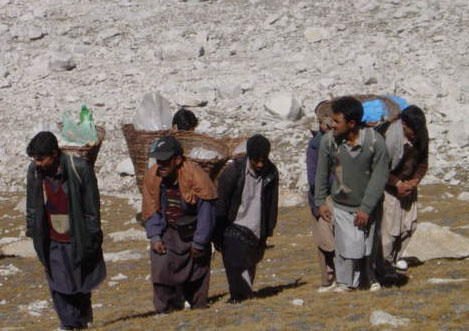
Transporting ice to the grafting site

In the high Himalaya, water is the limiting factor for agriculture and many farmers experience water scarcity in late autumn - a period critical to the maturation of crops. Farmers living in watersheds without glaciers are especially vulnerable since they largely depend on snowmelt for irrigation, in contrast to other areas where glaciers are a reliable source of water. In such communities glacier grafting is often attempted as a means to encourage the growth of new glaciers and thus ensure the existence of water resources.

== Procedures ==
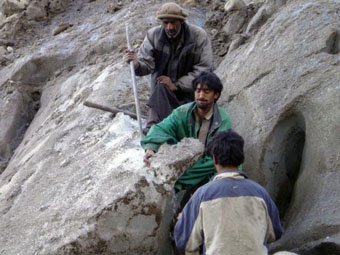
Difficult transport of ingredients for an artificial glacier

The first step involves looking for a location suitable for glacier growing. The preferred terrain, according to glacier growers in Baltistan and Gilgit, is in shadowed scree-slopes overlooked by steep headwalls. Commonly the sites are located between 4,000 and 5,000 metres above sea level. Such locations are susceptible to snowfall and avalanches during winter and spring, creating an environment conducive to the accumulation of ice.

Ice is transported in baskets of woven willow twigs by teams of two and two, who take turns carrying the baskets. This usually involves ascents from lower lying valleys (around 2,000-3,000 metres above sea level) up to the site selected for the glacier growing.

Similar efforts are being carried out by the noted engineer Chewang Norphel, in the adjacent Ladakh region. The ice stupa, a vertical, conical variation of glacier growing that is more viable at lower altitudes, was later developed in the Ladakh region by engineer Sonam Wangchuk.

== See also ==
- Ice Stupa
