= International Institute of Information Technology, Bhubaneswar =

Public technical institute in Odisha, India

- Motto: Imagine, Innovate, Inspire
- Type: Public technical university (Not-for-profit and self-sustaining)
- Established: 2006; 20 years ago
- Chairman: Anu Garg, IAS
- Director: Dr. Ashish Ghosh (I/C)
- Location: Bhubaneswar, Odisha, India; 20.2949°N 85.7437°E
- Campus: 36 acres
- Website: www.iiit-bh.ac.in

International Institute of Information Technology, Bhubaneswar (IIIT-BH) is a state university located in Bhubaneswar, Odisha, India. It was established in 2006 under the IIIT Act of 2004 by the Government of Odisha.

The institute offers undergraduate and postgraduate programs in the fields of Information Technology, Electrical and Electronics, Electronics and Communication, Computer Engineering, and Computer Science. MTech and PhD programs are also available in Computer Science and Electronics and Communication. The institute is a unitary technical university recognised by the University Grants Commission (India).

The campus is located in Gothapatna, Bhubaneswar, and is spread over 36 acres of land. It houses classrooms, laboratories, a library, separate hostels for boys and girls, faculty living quarters, sports facilities, and an auditorium.

== History ==
IIIT Bhubaneswar was initiated by the Government of Odisha and registered as a society in 2006, with the goal of providing quality technical education in the field of Information Technology. The institute started operating in September 2007 with the first batch of undergraduate students.On 9th Oct 2009 Chief minister Naveen Patnaik officially inaugurated the newly constructed campus of Institute.

The institute owes its origins to the private initiative of the Government of Odisha, which recognized the need for a technical university that could provide quality education in the field of Information Technology. In 2005, the then President of India, Dr. APJ Abdul Kalam, laid the foundation stone for the institute.

The institute is also recognized as a University Grants Commission (India) (UGC) recognised Unitary Technical University.

== Academics ==
=== Academic programmes ===
The institute offers undergraduate and postgraduate programmes. Undergraduate programs award BTech in information technology and areas of Electrical and Electronics, Electronics and Communication, information Technology and computer science. MTech and PhD programmes are available in computer science and electronics and communication. The institute is a University Grants Commission (India) recognised Unitary Technical University.
