= Women Transforming India =

Indian annual award

The Women Transforming India awards are an annual contest supported by the United Nations in India, Indian government website MyGov, and NITI Aayog (the National Institution for Transforming India). They honour "exceptional women entrepreneurs, who are breaking the glass ceiling and challenging stereotypes".

The first awards were given in 2016. It was announced that a shortlist of 10 names would be put to public vote on MyGov to produce three winners, but in fact out of nearly 1,000 entries a short list of 25 were put on MyGov for a poll which produced 12 winners, split into six winners and six runners-up.

In 2017, 12 winners were selected from about 3,000 entrants, and in 2018 15 winners were selected from over 2,500 entries.

== See also ==
- List of awards honoring women
