= Odisha Computer Application Centre =

Part of Indian state government

- Type: Technical Directorate of E&IT Department, Government of Odisha
- Industry: Electronics & IT
- Founded: 1985
- Headquarters: OCAC Building, Plot No. N-1/7-D, Acharya Vihar Square, Bhubaneswar, Odisha, India
- Area served: Odisha
- Key people: Sri Manoj Kumar Mishra IRTS; Chairman
- Owner: Government of Odisha
- Website: www.ocac.in

The Odisha Computer Application Centre or OCAC is a Designated Technical Directorate of Information Technology Department Public Sector Undertaking (PSU) of Government of Odisha registered under Society Registration Act, 1860 on dated 21 March 1985 redesignated as Technical Directorate of Information Technology Department, Government of Odisha.

== Projects ==
- OSWAS(Odisha Secretariate Workflow Automation System)
- Bhubaneswar Development Authority – Customer Care System
- Computerisation of Land Records
- Directorate of Animal Husbandry & Veterinary Services – SMS Based Reporting System
- Employee Database for Finance Department with DFID and Bannock Consulting
- Food Supplies and Consumer Welfare Department – PDS Information System
- Odisha Tourism Development Corporation – Hospitality Management System
- Panchayati Raj Department — BETAN (Payroll Information System)
- Health and Family Welfare Department – Computerisation of SCB Medical College & Hospital (SCBMCH), Cuttack
- Improving Citizen Access to Information (UNDP Supported Project)
- School & Mass Education Department – e-Sishu (Child Tracking System-2005)
- State Election Commission – Preparation of Electoral Rolls and Photo Identity Cards (EPIC Project)
- W & CD Department – e Pragati
- W & CD Department, Government of Odisha – Scheme Information System
- OCAC Training Centre;– Joint Venture of OCAC & OKCL

== Services ==
- Industry Facilitation
- IT Consultancy: Hardware and Software Evaluation, Implementation of RDBMS-Based Information Systems and Enterprise Wide Solutions, Site Preparation & Hardware Installation, Software Design, System Analysis, System Study, Tender Processing and Procurement, Web Hosting and Maintenance
- Schemes Development
- Training & Education

== Events Organized ==
- 2nd E-Odisha Summit 2014 on 24 January 2014 at Hotel Swosti Premium, Bhubaneswar
- 15th National Conference on E-Governance, Bhubaneswar, on 9 & 10 February 2012 at KIIT Auditorium, Bhubaneswar
- Orissa IT 2008 on 2 & 3 July 2008 at Hotel Swosti Plaza, Bhubaneswar
- French Film Festival on 31 March 2007, IDCOL Auditorium, Bhubaneswar
- Russian Cultural Festival on 24 March 2007 at Hotel Swosti Plaza, Bhubaneswar
