= Xavier Institute of Management, Bhubaneswar =

Indian business school

Coordinates: 20°18′30″N 85°49′3″E

Xavier Institute of Management
- Motto: To inspire futures with compassion, integrity and excellence
- Type: Jesuit Business school
- Established: 1987
- Affiliations: XIM University
- Director: Fr. Antony R Uvary, S.J.
- Faculty: 80+
- Location: Bhubaneswar, Odisha, India
- Campus: Urban, 20 acres (8.1 ha)
- Language: English
- Website: www.ximb.edu.in

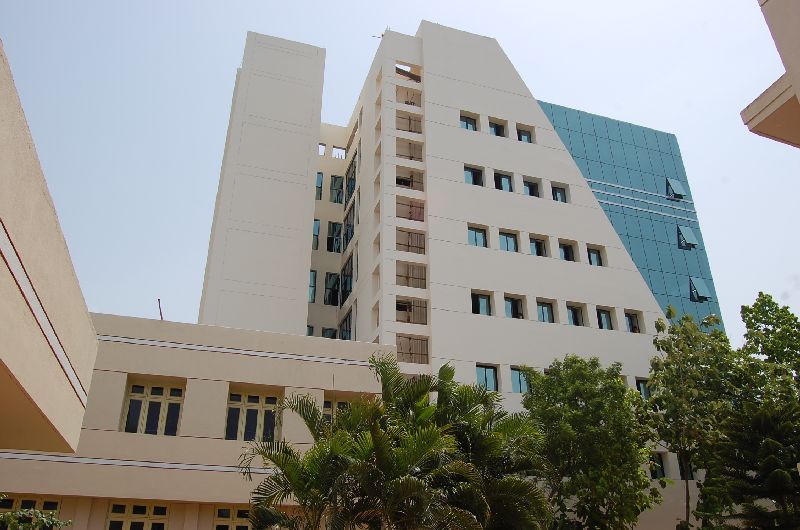
New Academic Block

Xavier Institute of Management, Bhubaneswar (XIMB) is a business school in Bhubaneswar, Odisha, India. Established in 1987, XIMB is governed by the Government of India, the Government of Odisha, and the Jesuits. The school was founded under what the parties called a 'social contract' between the Government of Odisha and the Jesuits in Odisha, with Fr. Romuald D'Souza SJ being its founder-director. XIMB has been part of the exclusive Super League of B-Schools (Top-10) in India – the highest tier rated by All India Management Association (AIMA). XIMB was ranked 10th in the prestigious Dare2Compete India's Top 10 Competitive B-Schools 2022. The institute was also ranked 1st in the state of Orissa Education World B-schools ranking 2020–21. The institute is known to carry out research and development activities regularly in collaboration with government departments in the state.

== Academics ==
The academic programmes offered by XIM university follow the global model for management education. XIMB confers MBA and PhD degrees through XIM University . Currently, XIMB offers MBA programmes in Business Management and Global Management, Executive MBA in Business Management and Business Analytics, and PhD programmes through XIM university. The PGDM programmes in Rural Management and Human Resource Management, previously offered by XIMB are now housed under two different schools of XIM University named as School of Rural Management (SRM) and School of Human Resource Management (SHRM).

== International exchange ==
XIMB engages in the international exchange of faculty and students with the following institutions:

- University of Stellenbosch Business School (USB), Cape Town, South Africa
- Skarbek Graduate School of Business Economics, Warsaw, Poland
- KEDGE Business School, Bordeaux and Marseille, France
- Reims Management School, Reims, France
- Antwerp Management School, Antwerp, Belgium
- Fordham University, New York, U.S.
- Sellinger School of Business and Management, Loyola College of Maryland, Baltimore, Maryland, U.S.
- Facultad de Economia – IQS, Barcelona, Spain
- Kyiv Investment Management Institute, Kyiv, Ukraine
- College of Management Law & Languages, Siauliai, Lithuania
- HHL-Leipzig Graduate School of Management, Leipzig, Germany
- IÉSEG School of Management, Lille – Paris, France
- Eastern Michigan University, Michigan, U.S.
- Warsaw School of Economics, Warsaw, Poland

A Ttam of PGDM second-year students from XIMB reached 4th place in the Rubicon International Business Case contest held in 2006 in Iserlohn, Germany. The team was the sole Asian finalist.

== Research centres ==
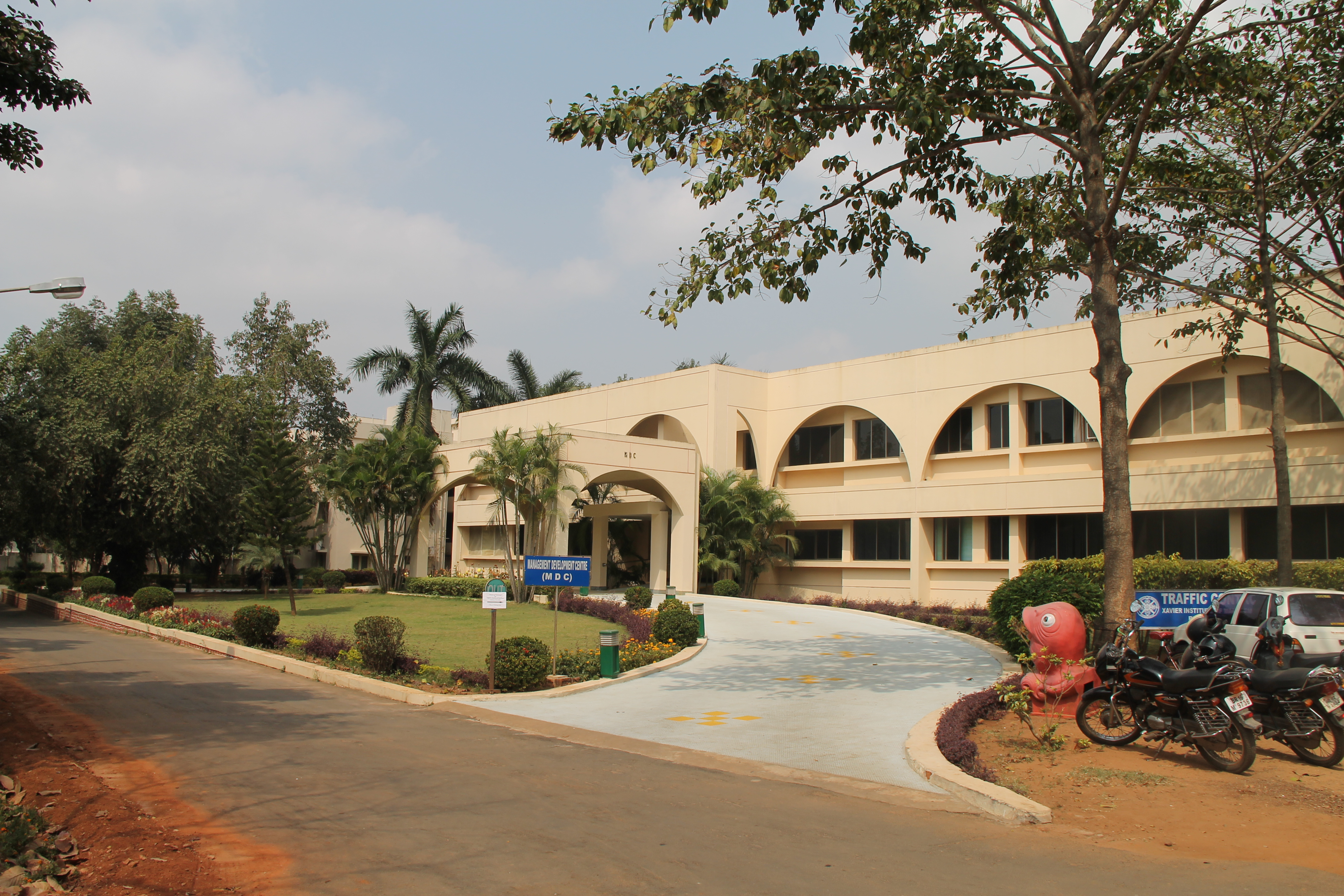
Management Development Center

Research centres at XIMB include:

- CII (Confederation of Indian Industry) – XIMB Centre of Excellence
- Centre for Development Research and Training
- Centre for Case Research
- Centre for EntrepreneurshiP
- Centre for Development of Small and Micro EnterpriseS
- Team Orissa Project Advisory Centre (TOPAX)
- Centre for Resettlement and Rehabilitation and Corporate Social Responsibility

XIMB under XIM university publishes five journals: Vilakshan, Journal of Research Practice (JRP), Research World, and International.

== Alumni ==
XIMB has a network of more than 11,000 alumni spread across the world. Details of prominent alumni, the XIMB Alumni Association and other such information can be found at the official portal of the alumni association https://www.ximalumni.com.

== Accreditation ==
XIMB along with SHRM and SRM which are collectively known as Faculty of Management at XIM University have been granted the South Asian Quality Assurance Systems (SAQS) accreditation by the Association of Management Development Institutions in South Asia (AMDISA) and the NBA Accreditation by the National Board of Accreditation.

== Infrastructure ==
- Academic Block: XIMB has four administrative and academic buildings. The new academic block has a board room, conference room, and examination hall; all classrooms are air-conditioned and equipped with audio-video systems, overhead projectors, computers, and wireless hotspots. The auditorium seats 850 and is a venue for conventions and high-level forums.
- Library: The three-storied library has a collection of printed and electronic resources which includes books, journals, working papers, audiovisual resources, dissertations, annual reports of corporate houses, volumes of periodicals, and international online databases on management development studies and related topics.
- Residence: Students are required to reside on campus, in separate residences for men and women, with Wi-Fi throughout. The Studio apartment building has 113 furnished apartments for students, faculty, and visiting professionals. Some of the other apartment buildings (for men) are Cenderet, GR-I, and GR-II. For women, there are two residence buildings namely RMH and MTR.
- Sports: There are two floodlit tennis courts and a basketball court, indoor badminton court, volleyball court, jogging track, and facilities for indoor sports for students and faculty. The institute also has a multipurpose gymnasium open 24/7.
- Extension of campus: XIMB has started its first extension campus near Sundarpada jatani road in the outskirts of Bhubaneswar named as XIM University where its existing programmes in Business Management, Rural Management & Human Resource Management are now delivered along with multiple new industry-oriented programmes. The XIM campus near Sundarpada, is a state of the art, digital campus spread over 35 acres of land. XIM University has started a number of next-generation courses at both undergraduate and post-graduate levels in areas such as Economics, sustainability, Public Policy, Urban Studies, Computer Sciences etc.
- Virtual classroom: XIMB's virtual classroom program reaches 100 cities.

== Campus life ==
There are a number of student committees for the Institute and for student life. The Student Executive Council (SEC) is made up of students; it handles and controls all student activities and various committees.

XIMB has four core committees:

- Career Advisory Services (CAS): Placement Committee
- IlluminatiX (the Media and PR Cell)
- Alumni Committee
- International Relations Committee

Apart from this, there a number of functional committees:

- MAXIM: The Marketing Association of XIMB
- CONSTRAT: The Consulting and Strategy Consortium of XIMB
- X-FIN: The Finance Association of XIMB
- X-SYS: The Systems Association of XIMB
- X-OPS: The Operations Association of XIMB
- XIMAHR: The HR Association of XIM University

 

- RMAX: Rural Management association of XIMB

There are also a number of Interest committees, which include:

- SpeakUp: The Oratory Club
- XQuizzite: The Quizzing Society
- Spicmacay: Society for Promotion of Indian Classical Music and Culture Among Youth
- XPRESSIONS Steering Committee: The annual inter-B-school meet team
- SRC: Social Responsibility Cell, XIMB
- XStage: The Cultural Club, XIMB
- SportsCom: The Sports Committee of XIMB
- XSEED: The Entrepreneurship Development Cell, XIMB
- X-Lens: The Photography Committee of XIMB

== Events ==
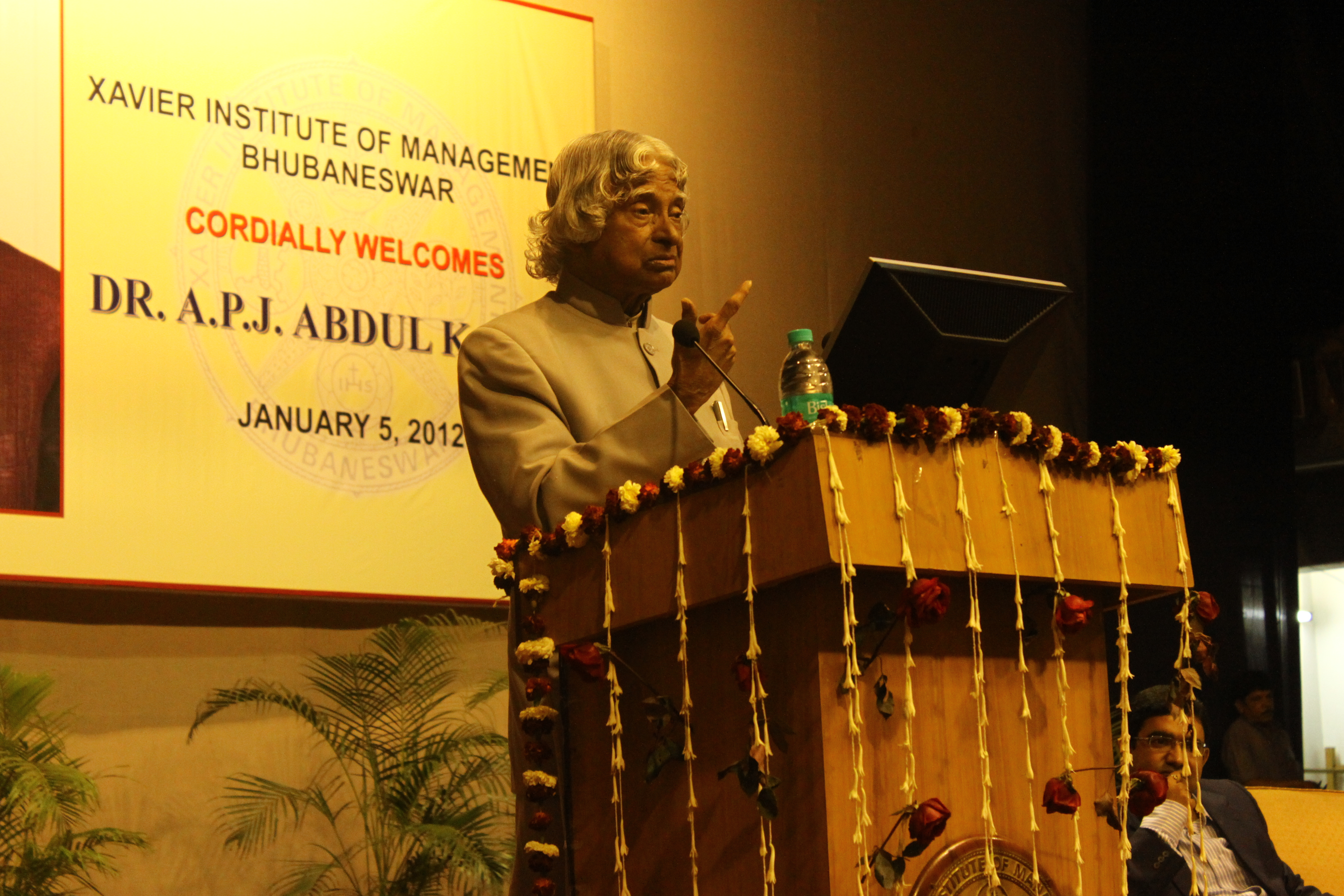
Dr. APJ Abdul Kalam at XIMB

Business and cultural events include "Xpressions", an annual business strategy games festival organised by the students of XIMB. Xpressions 2011 included appearances from Lucky Ali, Jagjit Singh, Euphoria, and Jal.

== See also ==
- List of Jesuit sites
