= Cis-Sutlej states =

Group of states in northwestern India

Coordinates: 31°00′N 77°30′E

Cis-Sutlej States
- Region of British India
- 1809–1849
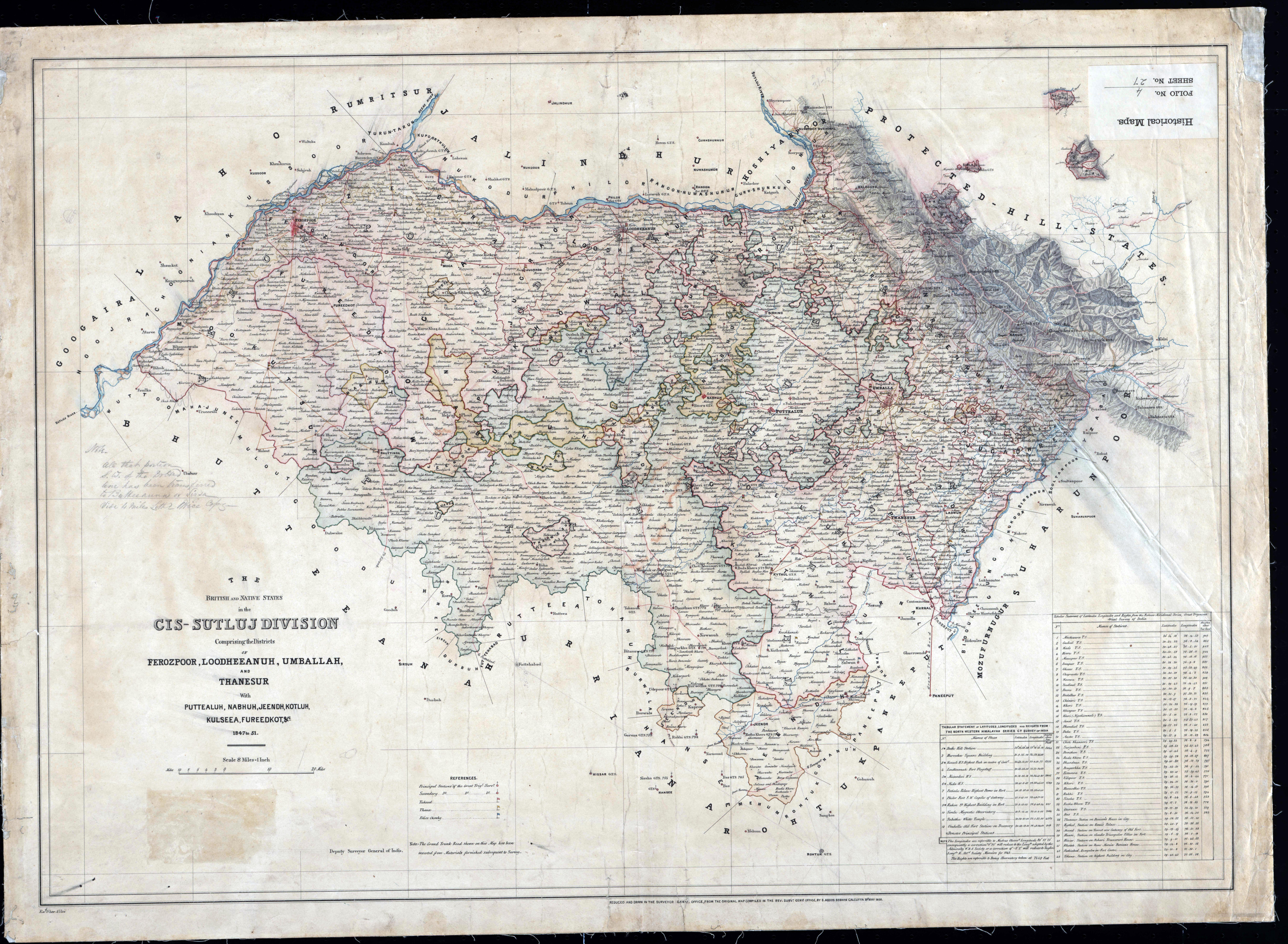
- British and native states in the Cis-Sutlej Division between 1847–51, by Abdos Sobhan, 1858. The Cis-Sutlej states are visible south of the Sutlej river.
- History
  - British protectorate: 1809
  - Merged into the Punjab Province (British India): 1849
Preceded by	Succeeded by
Maratha Empire	Company rule in India

The Cis-Sutlej states were a group of states in the contemporary Punjab and Haryana states of northern India during the 19th century, lying between the Sutlej River on the north, the Himalayas on the east, the Yamuna River and Delhi District on the south, and Sirsa District on the west. The small Punjabi kingdoms of the Cis-Sutlej states were under influence of Marathas, until the Second Anglo-Maratha War of 1803–1805, after which the Marathas lost this territory to the British. During the British period, some of the Cis-Sutlej were annexed by the British due to the doctrine of lapse.

The Cis-Sutlej states included Kalsia State, Kaithal State, Patiala State, Nabha State, Jind State, Thanesar, Malerkotla State, Ludhiana, Kapurthala State, Ladwa State, Ambala, Ferozpur District (without Fazilka) and Faridkot State, among others. A large amount of the Cis-Sutlej states were Phulkian states ruled by a dynasty of the same name.

== History ==
=== Mughal and Afghan period ===
The Cis-Sutlej region was ruled by many chiefs though the region was under the Mughal Empire. Due to the decline of the Mughal and Afghan empires in the Punjab, the Cis-Sutlej chiefs were de facto ruling independently, yet were often engaged in localized conflicts. The founder of the chiefdom of Patiala, Ala Singh, had been conquering territory from circa 1730 onwards.

Sirhind had been attacked by the Sikhs four times in the 18th century. After the last attack known as the Battle of Sirhind in 13–14 January 1764, the Cis-Sutlej tract became dominated by Sikhs after its Afghan governor, Zain Khan Sirhindi, was killed by a coalition of Sikh forces of both the Buddha Dal and Taruna Dal divisions of the Dal Khalsa military of the Sikh Confederacy. The victory of the Sikhs ended foreign Afghan-rule over the region. Lepel Henry Griffin stated:

The storm burst at last. The Sikhs of the Majha country of Lahore, Amritsar, Ferozepur combined their forces at Sirhind, routed and killed the Afghan governor, Zain Khan and pouring across Sutlej occupied the whole country to the Jamna without further opposition. It is enough to say that with few exceptions, the leading families of today are the direct descendants of the conquerors of Zain Khan.

— Lepel Henry Griffin

Artillery, supplies, and treasures fell into the possession of the Sikh forces after the victory at Sirhind, which helped them further, especially Ala Singh of Patiala. The victory helped consolidate the political entity of Patiala. The settlement of Sirhind was mostly completely destroyed after the battle, which meant its former residents shifted to other locations, especially Patiala in Ala Singh's state. Ala Singh would strike coins in the aftermath of the victory, with the coins bearing similarities to coins that had earlier been struck by Ahmad Shah Abdali at the Sirhind mint. The triump of the Sikhs attracted the hostilities of the Malerkotla ruler Bhikhan Khan, whom was anxious about a similar fate for Malerkotla, as Malerkotla had assisted Zain Khan in the Vadda Ghallughara massacre. Amar Singh of Patiala and Bhikhan Khan later would fight at Kakra, with Patiala prevailing and capturing the settlements of Sherpur and Bhasaur, and the Malerkotla ruler being killed. Also, Amar Singh obtained an Afghan sword of the Malerkotla ruler as war-booty.

=== Maratha period ===
==== 1785-1806 ====
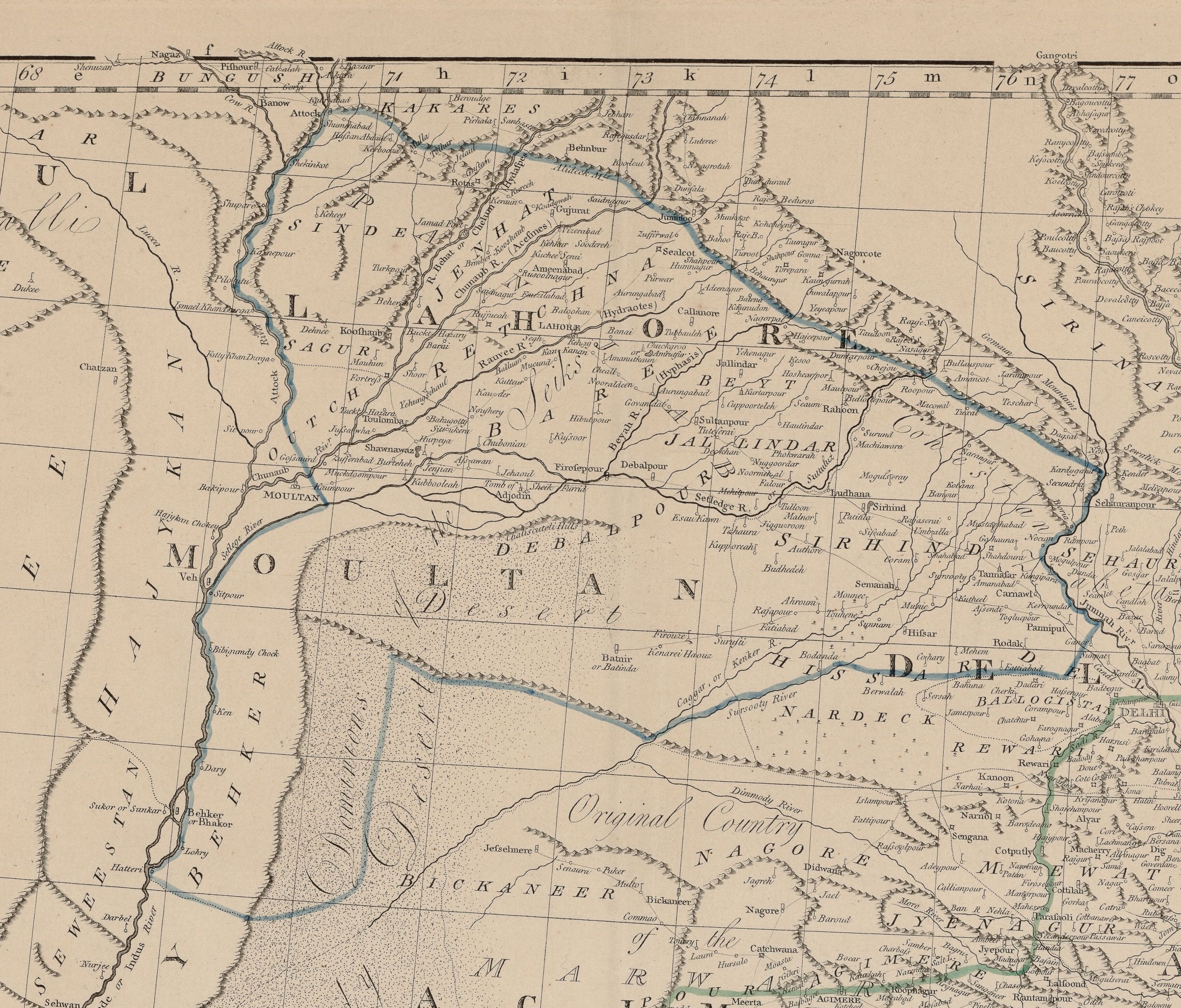
Detail of Sikh territory from a map of India, by James Rennell, 1 January 1788

Mughal Emperor Shah Alam II's viceregent Afrasiyab was killed by Zain-ul-Abidin Khan on 2 November 1784, thus leaving no one to appoint as the next viceregent. Thus Mughal Emperor appointed Mahadji Sindhia as viceregent (Vakil-i-Mutlaq) of the Mughal empire as Shah Alam II knew that Sindhia is the only one who would remain acquiescent to him and would be able to maintain peace and order in his kingdom. The Maratha-Sikh treaty on 10 May 1785 made the small Cis-Sutlej states, autonomous protectorate of the Scindia Dynasty of the Maratha Empire, as Mahadji Sindhia was deputed the Vakil-i-Mutlaq (Regent of the Mughal empire) of Mughal affairs in 1784. With the Maratha-Sikh treaty in 1785 the small Cis-Sutlej states came under the Influence of the Scindia Dynasty of the Maratha Empire. Therefore, Mahadji as newly appointed viceregent of the Mughal Emperor, tried to come to an agreement with the Cis-Sutlej chiefs and concluded a treaty on 10 May 1785.

According to the treaty, Mahadji would recognize the political supremacy of the Sikhs in the Punjab whereas the Sikhs would forbear from attacking the adjoining territories of Delhi. Additionally, the chiefs would join Sindhia's army with at least 5,000 horses and in return would receive a land grant of 10 Lakhs and the chiefs would not muddle in the affairs outside of their territory. Additionally, it was agreed that any territories conquered through the joint alliance of Sikhs and the Marathas, the Sikhs would keep one-third of the territories and the enemies of both the parties would be considered mutual. However the treaty fell apart as the chiefs did not observe the terms of the treaty. In 1789, again a peaceful agreement was set in place where Sindhia legitamized the chiefs to collect tributes from the villages as the purpose behind Mahadji's policy was to win over the chiefs by friendship, but this policy too failed.

After Mahadji's death in 1794, Daulat Rao was made his replacement, under whom the unstable conditions continued against the chiefs till the Second Anglo-Maratha War from 1803-1805, losing any influence over Cis-Sutlej states and parts of Uttar Pradesh, which he administered on behalf of the Mughal Emperor. The Cis-Sutlej chiefs fought against the British at the Battle of Delhi (1803). In the aftermath, the Maratha leader Yashwantrao Holkar sought refuge in Amritsar but Ranjit Singh of the Sikh Empire refused to offer him assistance against the British commanded under Gerard Lake.

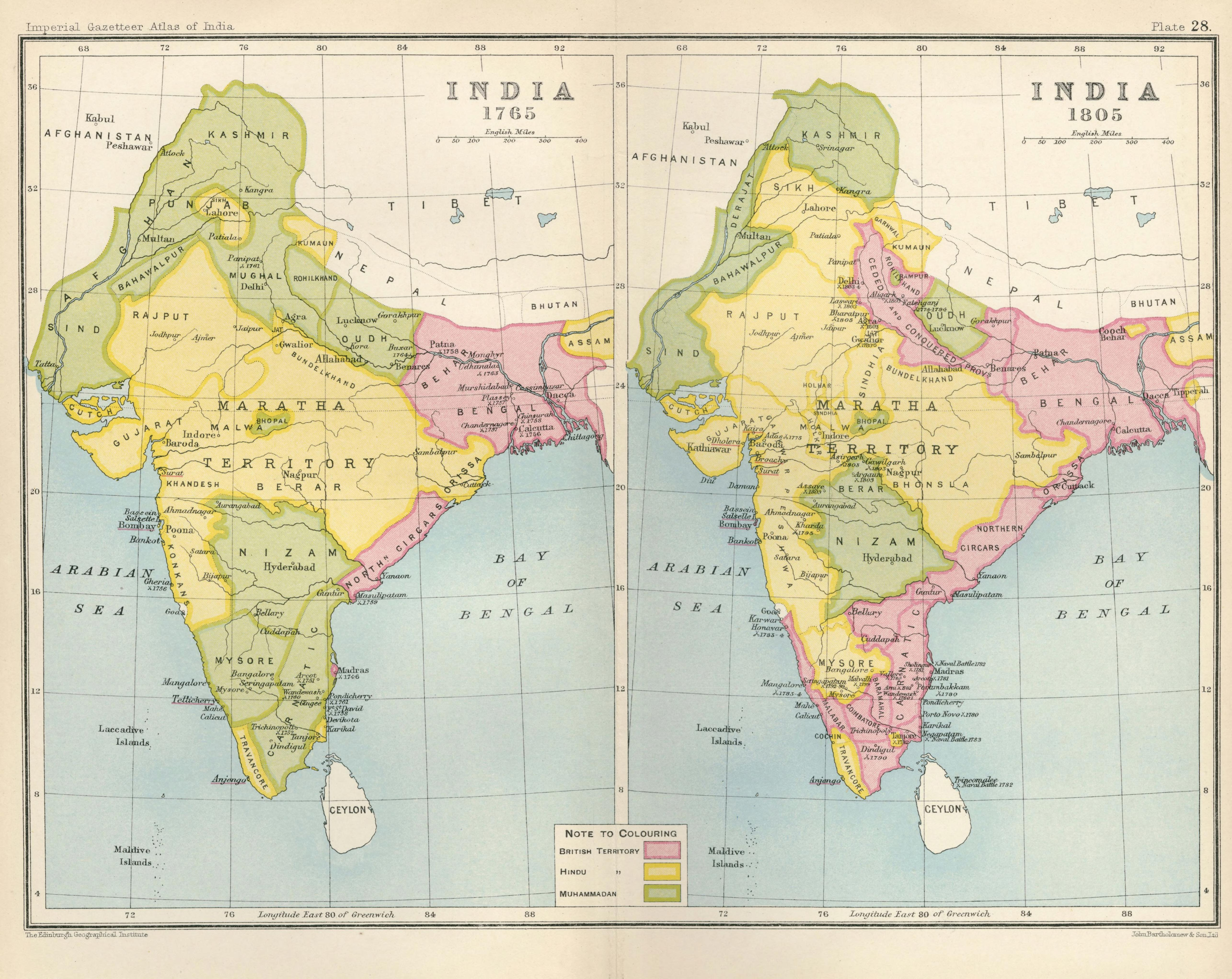
Political maps of India in the years 1765 and 1805, published in the 'Imperial Gazetteer of India' (Vol. XXVI, Atlas; 1931 revised edition; plate no. 28)

On 20 December 1803, British East India Company transmitted and settled a treaty of peace and friendship with Daulat Rao Sindhia, his successors, heirs and children, followed with a treaty of Alliance settled on 27 February 1804, which caused Sindhia not just a considerable loss of territories from the treaty but also had to give away the right to handle their foreign affairs to British East India Company. Due to doubts and mistunderstanding of the treaty signed in 1804, another improvised treaty was transmitted and settled on 22 November 1805 between the two states, called Treaty of Amity and Alliance, where according to article 5, Chambul river would be the extent of the Sindhia dynasty, thus relinquishing any claims, rights, rule, tribute, revenues and possessions in the north bank.

Following the Second Anglo-Maratha War, in 1806, Arthur Wellesley, 1st Duke of Wellington drafted a treaty granting independence to the Sikh clans east of the Sutlej River in exchange for their allegiance to the British General Gerard Lake acting on his dispatch. The subsequent Treaty of Lahore of 1 January 1806 agreed that the Marathas would not remain in Punjab, secured a Sikh-British alliance, and guaranteed Sikh autonomy from the British north of the Sutlej river. At the conclusion of the war, the frontier of British India was extended to the Yamuna.

=== British protection ===
==== Cis-Sutlej expeditions of the Sikh Empire ====
The Sikh Empire of Ranjit Singh led three expeditions into Cis-Sutlej states in 1806, 1807 and 1808, seizing many territories, particularly 45 district subdivisions or administrative units (parganas) and then distributed them among different chiefs who would pay annual tributes of certain amount as recognition of Ranjit Singh's supremacy.

The casus belli for Ranjit Singh to expand into the Cis-Sutlej region was an internal conflict between the states of Nabha and Patiala, with the Sikh Empire using it as a cause for its military crossing over the Sutlej river on 26 July 1806. On 26 July 1806, the Sikh Empire would capture Ludhiana in their Cis-Sutlej expedition, with control over the captured Ludhiana being given-over to Raja Bhag Singh of Jind State, whom was the uncle of Maharaja Ranjit Singh. These events alarmed the British, who were concerned about the Sikh Empire possibly expanding into the restive Sirhind region. In 1807, the military of the Sikh Empire crossed the Sutlej river a second time, this time the local chieftains of the Sirhind region requested British protection against the Lahore State. In September 1808, fearing a possible French invasion of the Indian subcontinent, the British dispatched Charles Metcalfe to the Sikh Empire to formulate a treaty between the British and Ranjit Singh, whilst the Cis-Sutlej chiefs were also ensured their protection by the British against Ranjit Singh's ambitions. Then, Ranjit Singh's army crossed the Sutlej river a third time, where they took-control of Ambala and Faridkot, yet stopping short of capturing Patiala due to concerns of British retribution. However, due to a various of factors the Sikh Empire agreed upon signing a treaty with the British, signing one on 25 April 1809, with the transaction being finalized by a proclamation on 3 May 1809. The factors that led to the Sikh Empire signing the treaty were as follows:

- After Ranjit Singh's third Cis-Sutlej expedition, a detachment of the British forces advanced under the leadership of David Ochterlony, with the general stating on 9 February 1809 that further incursions by the Sikh Empire south of the Sutlej would be met with British aggression going forward.
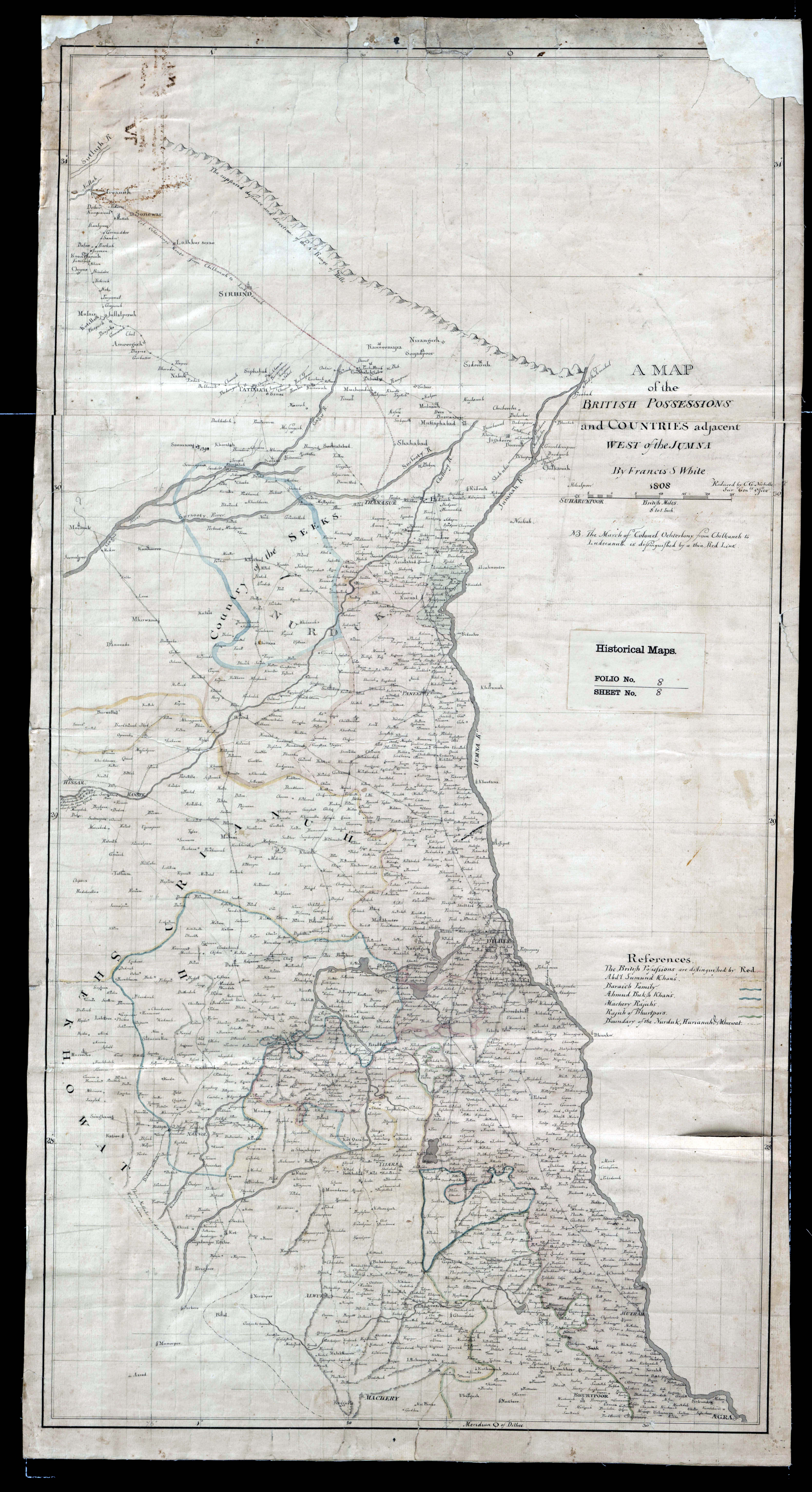
  Map of the British possessions and countries adjacent to them west of the Yamuna River, showing the march of Col. Ochterlony, surveyed by F. S. White, 1808, reduced by C. G. Nicholls
- The Sikh Empire worried that further aggressions would intimidate the Cis-Sutlej chiefs to move further toward developing a firmer alliance with the British.
- Metcalfe assured Ranjit Singh's court that the British would not interfere with Sikh conquests in the opposite direction toward Afghanistan.
- Ranjit Singh had assumed that there would be less anxiety over the western frontier due to improved relations between the British and Ottomans after the ascension of Mahmud II, allowing for a cessation of hostilities.

Following the Second Anglo-Maratha War in 1806, Arthur Wellesley, 1st Duke of Wellington drafted a treaty in 1809, granting independence to the Sikh clans east of the Sutlej River in exchange for their allegiance to the British General Gerard Lake, acting on his dispatch. At the conclusion of the war, the frontier of British India was extended to the Yamuna river.

The 1809 treaty between the Sikh Empire and British had the following terms:

- The British will not interfere in the affairs of Lahore State north of the Sutlej.
- The second article of the treaty stipulated that the Lahore State will not post more troops than necessary on the left bank of the Sutlej river. It shall only station enough troops necessary to administer the area.
- The forces of the Sikh Empire shall never dispossess the local Cis-Sutlej chiefs of their territory or interfere in their affairs.

As per the 1809 treaty, Ranjit Singh was permitted to retain his Cis-Sutlej territories that had been acquired prior to his third expedition but Ranjit Singh had vacated his control over Faridkot and Ambala. Furthermore, he was not permitted to form an alliance with any of the Cis-Sutlej chiefs. Ranjit Singh possessed 45 Taluqas in the Cis-Sutlej states, wholly or in share with others on the British side of the river Sutlej. On 29 July 1809, David Ochterlony recognized large territory along river Sutlej from Chamkaur to Harikepatan and Kot Kapura as directly under Ranjit Singh's control. Dewan Mokham Chand, Ranjit Singh's commander was granted 102 villages in the tehsil of Dharamkot, Zira and Kot Kapura, which also belonged to Ranjit Singh. Raja of Jind, maternal uncle of Ranjit Singh, was granted 90 villages in the paraganah of Ludhiana-Sirhind Raja of Kapurthala, brother of Ranjit Singh, was awarded 106 villages in the tehsil of Talwandi and Naraingarh. Other rewards as part of the treaty were, 38 villages secured to Raja Jaswant Singh of Nabha State, 32 villages in the tehsil of Baddowal secured to Gurdit Singh of Ladwa, 36 villages in the tehsil of Ghungrana secured to Karam Singh Nagia, 62 villages in the tehsil of Dharamkot granted to Garbha Singh of Bharatgarh, many number of villages granted to Jodh Singh of Kalsia, Basant Singh, Atar Singh, Jodh Singh of Bassia and Ranjit Singh's mother in law Sada Kaur was granted with Himmatpur-Wadni. The recipients were granted the territories under the condition of submission to Ranjit Singh's supremacy. As per the treaty of 1809, Ranjit Singh was not allowed to maintain more troops than were required for the internal duties of the territory on the left bank of river Sutlej, nor commit or suffer any encroachments on the possession or rights of the chiefs in its vicinity. The treaty pushed the boundary of British India from the Yamuna to the Sutlej river. The treaty was successful at halting the southern expansion of the Sikh Empire south of the Sutlej river, with Ranjit Singh instead turning his immediate focus to the Gurkha occupation in the Punjab Hills and internal conflict in Afghanistan shortly thereafter. Patiala signed a treaty with the British giving them suzerainty, as did seventy other principalities in the region.

==== Post-1809 ====
In-order to prevent the Cis-Sutlej states from in-fighting with another, the British issued a decree on 22 August 1811 that no Cis-Sutlej state should seize another, whilst affirming the British commitment to respecting each state's independence and rights. Relations between the Lahore State and British improved after the signing of the 1809 treaty, and Ranjit Singh would hold periodic diplomatic meetings with Claude Martin Wade at Ludhiana, with the British conceding to the Lahore State's claims of certain Cis-Sutlej territories yet the British successfully laid claim to Ferozepore. Friendly relations between the Sikh Empire and the British was reaffirmed in a meeting between Ranjit Singh and William Bentick at Ropar in October 1831, where it was mutually agreed that the Sutlej river should be opened-up for trade. During the reign of Karam Singh of Patiala, his kingdom became the second largest Sikh state aside from the Sikh Empire, being based in southern Punjab and northern Haryana.

The Charter Act 1813 explicitly proclaimed the sovereignty of the royal crown over the conquered Indian territories held by the British East India Company, with the governor-general no longer being styled as a servant of the Mughal empire and the tribute given to the Mughals was no longer in the governor-general's name. The EIC also lost any exclusive-trading rights it once had in India. The EIC gradually was transformed into an agency of the British crown for governing the Indian possessions, by 1833 the Company no longer being allowed to conduct commercial activities.

Map of the Malwa region of Punjab (c. 1829–1835)

On 17 March 1828, Captain W. Murray prepared a list of 45 Taluqas in south of Satluj that belonged and were claimed by Ranjit Singh. They were: Anandpur, Makhowal, Mattewala, Bajr, Goewal, Howab, Karesh, Sujarwala, Sohera, Sailbah, Khai, Muedkoh, Wazirpur, Kunki, Saholi, Basi, Bharog, Jagraon, Kot Isa Khan, Mahani, Khaspura, Molanwala, Naraingarh, Sadar Khan, Tohra, Mari, Machhiwara, Kotari, Puwa, Want, part of Kotlah, Kot Guru Har Sahe, Dharamkot, Rajwana, Fatahgarh, Kala Majri, Chuhar Chak, Dhilwan, Talwandi Sayyidan, Jhandianah, Buthor, Ranian, Baholpur, Bharatgarh, Chanelgarh, Lohangarh, Phillaur district, Firozpur, Nurpur, Khaira, Sohala, Todarpur, Tughal, part of Kotlah, Ghungrana, Rumanwala, Mamdot, Sanehwal, Rasulpur, Aitiana, Himmatpur, Pattoki, Wadni, Moga, Mohlan, Zira, Behekbodia, Bhagra, Hitawat, Jinwar, Kot Kapura, Muktsar, Kenoan, Singhanwala, Suhewaron, Chamkaur and Molwal.

In 1834, the exiled leader of Afghanistan, Shah Shuja, went to Ludhiana. At Ludhiana on the directions of Dosh Mohammad, Abdul Ghiyas Khan attempted to elicit British help against the Sikhs in an effort to re-secure Peshawar for the Afghans, which had been recently conquered by the Sikhs but the British refused to assist.

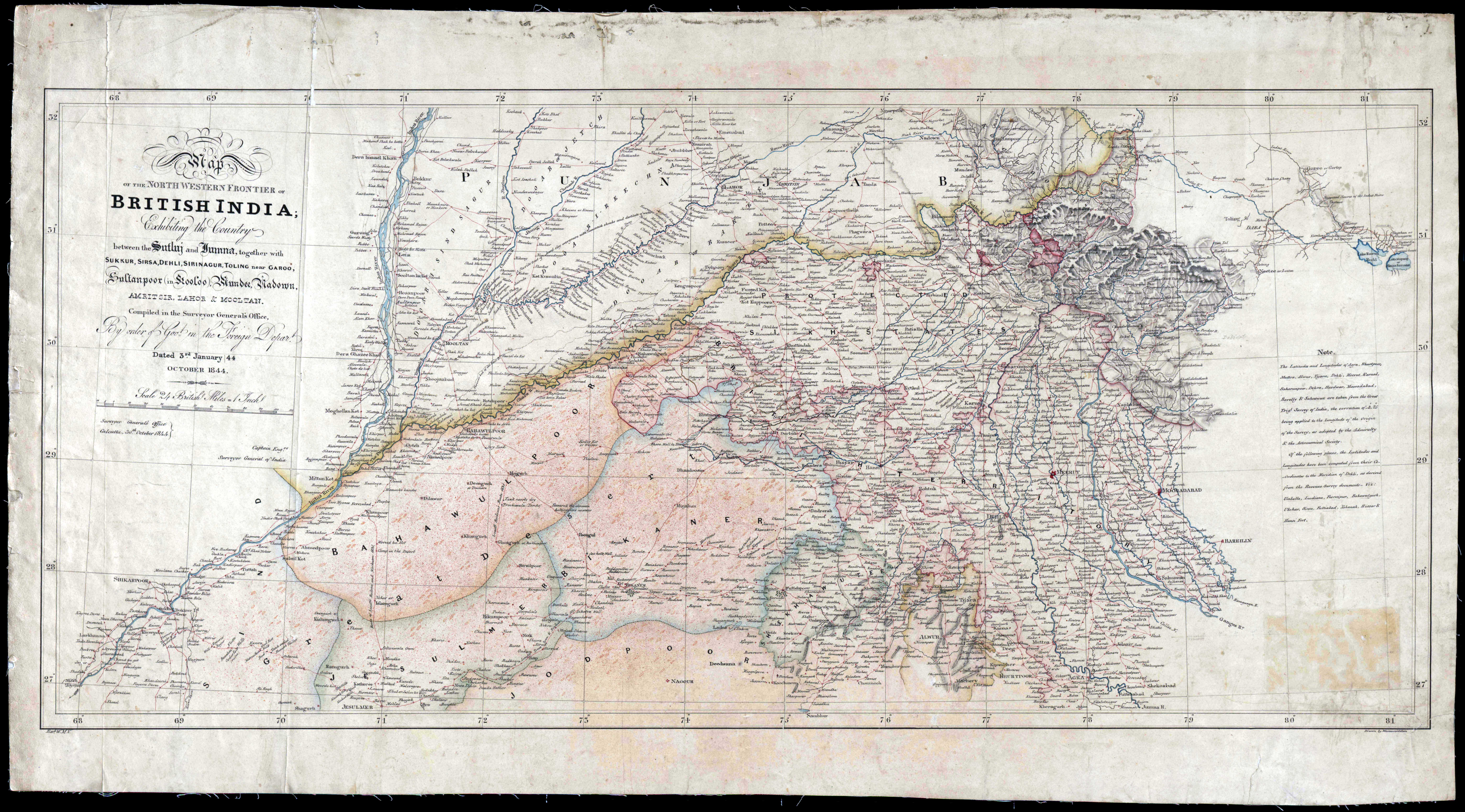
1844 Map of the Cis-Sutlej states

At the end of 1838, an ailing Ranjit Singh met George Eden Auckland at Ferozepore. Ranjit Singh died shortly after the meeting on 27 June 1839. Indirect causes which contributed to the first Anglo-Sikh war includes a dispute between the British and Sikh Empire regarding a village in Nabha State where both parties had vested interest in, and also due to the British not returning the treasures of Suchet Singh that had been brought to Ferozepore prior to Suchet's death. Furthermore, a buildup of British military forces along the Sutlej boundary caused unease and suspicion of British intentions within the Sikh Empire. Thus, the Sikh Empire's forces crossed the Sutlej on 11 December 1845 in an attempted surprise attack on the British with intentions for marching toward Delhi, with the Sutlej crossing occurring between Huriki and Kasur, with war being declared by the British governor-general on 13 December 1845. In response to Sikh hostilities, the British made a resolve to dispossess the Sikh Empire of its Cis-Sutlej territories in the course of the war. The Sikh army was eventually routed by the British at key engagements and fled across the Sutlej, with the British in pursuit on-march toward Lahore, eventually occupying the capital on 20 February 1846. In the aftermath of the subsequent treaty on 9 March 1846, the Sikh Empire's territory south of the Sutlej river, the Jalandhar Doab (tract of land situated between the Beas and Sutlej rivers) were annexed by the British, and the hill territory located between the Beas and Indus rivers (incl. Kashmir and Hazara).

Before 1846 the greater part of this territory was relatively independent, the chiefs being subject to supervision from a political officer stationed at Umballa, and styled the agent of the British Governor-General of India for the Cis-Sutlej states.

A number of states were confiscated or acquired by Britain under the Doctrine of Lapse. The doctrine of lapse, which was incorporated in most of the treaties between the British and native Indian states, stipulated that any princely state in British India whose ruler had no heir would lapse into direct Company-control after the death of the issue-less ruler. Furthermore, the British installed an official known as a "resident" at the court of prominent princely states. After the Charter Act 1833, the highest office in British India during this period of Company-rule was the Governor-General of India based in Calcutta. After the First Anglo-Sikh War the full administration of the territory became vested in this officer.

Map of the Punjab and protected Sikh states, including Gulab Singh's territory, 1842

In 1849, the Punjab was annexed to British India, when the Cis-Sutlej states commissionership, comprising the districts of Ambala, Ferozepore, Ludhiana, Thanesar and Simla, was incorporated with the new Punjab Province.

The name continued to be applied to this division until 1862, when—owing to Ferozepore having been transferred to Lahore Division and a part of Thanesar to Delhi Division—it ceased to be appropriate. The remaining tract became known as the Ambala Division. The princely states of Patiala, Jind, and Nabha were appointed a separate political agency in 1901. Excluding Bahawalpur (for which there was no political agent) and Chamba, the other states were grouped under the commissioners of Jullunder and Delhi, and the superintendent of the Simla Hill States. All native states, except Kaithal, would join PEPSU after India's independence.

== Role of women in the Cis-Sutlej states ==
The Cis-Sutlej states had many powerful and influential women in their administrations. Lepel Griffin remarked that the Phulkian chiefs excluded women from positions of power due to "... suspicion that they [women] were able to use it far more wisely than themselves [men]". Some examples of such women are:

- Mai Fatto (Patiala State)
- Bibi Pardhan Kaur (Patiala State)
- Bibi Rajindar Kaur (Patiala State)
- Bibi Sahib Kaur (Patiala State)
- Rani Lacchman Kaur (Ferozepore Estate)
- Mai Sahib (Kaithal State)
- Rani Nur Un Nissa (Raikot State)

== Districts and states ==
=== Present districts and divisions ===
- The Union territory of Chandigarh
- Patiala district
- Mohali district
- Mansa district
- Barnala district
- Sangrur district
- Jalandhar district
- Muktsar district
- Hoshiarpur district
- Bathinda district
- Ludhiana district
- Firozpur district
- Panchkula district
- Jind district
- Ambala district
- Fazilka district (only the northern part)
- Faridkot district
- Moga district
- Fatehgarh Sahib district
- Rupnagar district
- Yamunanagar district

The current 14 districts of East Punjab, Chandigarh, and the 4 districts of Haryana were present in the Cis-Sutlej States.

The rest of the Bist Doab including districts of Hoshiarpur, Kapurthala, SBS Nagar, and Jalandhar were merged and made a new Trans-Sutlej States in 1846 after the First Anglo-Sikh War.

=== Ruling states ===
- Patiala
- Jind
- Nabha
- Faridkot
- Maler Kotla
- Kalsia
- Kaithal
- Kapurthala
- Ladwa

== See also ==
- Delhi Territory
- Maratha Empire
- Maratha conquest of North-west India
- Second Anglo-Maratha War
- Sikh Empire
- Phulkian sardars
- Patiala State
- Nabha State
- Jind State
- Faridkot State
- Malaudh
- Bhadaur
- Kaithal

== Sources ==
- Gupta, Hari Ram (1991). History of the Sikhs Volume 5. Munshiram Manoharlal. pp. 83–96. ISBN 9788121505154.
