= Kaithal State =

Sikh state

- 1767–1843
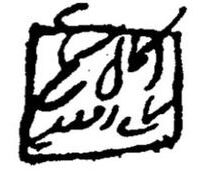
- Seal of Bhai Udai Singh of Kaithal

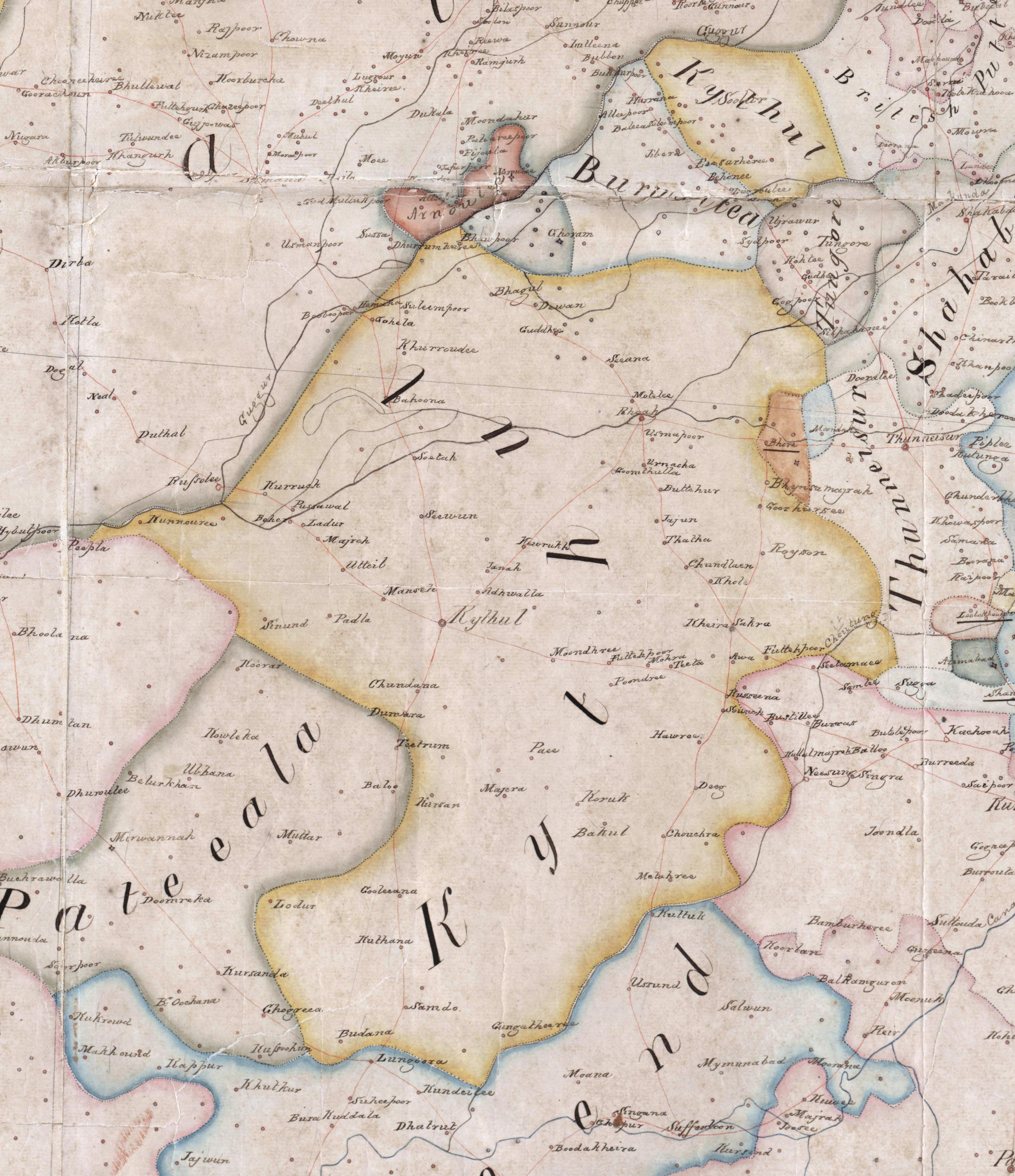
- Detail of the main, continuous tract of territory of Kaithal State from a map created by the British East India Company, ca.1829–1835 (not including its exclaves viewable on the full-map)
- Capital: Kaithal
- History
  - Established: 1767
  - Disestablished: 1843
- Today part of: Kaithal district, Haryana, India

Kaithal State was a Sikh state based out of Kaithal. It was one of the Cis-Sutlej states. The Sikh chieftains of Kaithal ruled from 1767 until the state's fall in 1843. At the state's height, it was the second-largest cis-Sutlej state, after Patiala State. The rulers of the state were popularly known by the title of bhai (meaning "brother").

== History ==
=== Family background ===
The polity was founded by Jat Sikhs of the Sidhu gotra (clan). It was founded by Desu Singh, who was a sardar from the Dallewalia Misl and an apparent descendant of a Sikh saint, Bhai Dayala (or Bhai Dayal Das).

Dayal Das was a Sikh saint who is noted for saving the life of Mai Fatto, when her family attempted to commit female-infanticide. Mai Fatto later became the wife of Baba Ala Singh of Patiala. Ala Singh and Fatto would visit the Bhais at Bhucho for advice. Dayal Das had a son named Gurbaksh Singh. Gurbaksh Singh assisted the Patiala rulers as a soldier and later established his own state, whilst other sources attribute the establishment of Kaithal to his son Desu. The eldest son of Gurbaksh Singh and brother of Desu Singh was Budh Singh.

Desu Singh was one of six sons of Gurbaksh Singh of Lalpur (died 1760; Gurbaksh was an ally of Ala Singh of Patiala) and was closely allied with the Phulkian family. Desu Singh is said to have had a saintly disposition, earning him the bhai (brother) appellation.

=== Establishment and rule by Desu Singh ===
In January 1764, Desu Singh captured the parganas of Amlu Arnauli, Bangar, Derah, Kularkharyal, Mustafabad, Sindhuwal, Tandwal, and Thanesar, however these were taken from him by Bhanga Singh. In 1767, the city of Kaithal fell into the hands of the Phulkian chieftain, Desu Singh. He had captured the principality of Kaithal from two Afghan chiefs, Bhikbakhsh Khan and Neamat Khan. Furthermore, Desu Singh annexed Pundri and expelled the Sayyids from it.

In 1779, the Mughal minister of Delhi, Abdul Ahad, launched a military expedition against the cis-Sutlej Sikh chiefs. On 9 September 1779, the nawab dispatched Baghel Singh, Gajpat Singh, and Sada Singh, to bring Desu Singh to the camp at Thanesar. When Desu arrived at the camp, Baghel explained that Desu had been dispossed of his territory by Amar Singh of Patiala and that his lost territory should be restored to him. Desu Singh offered a nazar (tribute) to the nawab consisting of five gold coins, two bows, five cotton bed-sheets, and two steeds. In-return, Desu Singh was gifted a khilat of five pieces, a sarpech, and a sword, while two doshalas were bestowed to one of his associates with him. Abdul Ahad demanded that Desu pay a tribute of three lakh rupees, however Desu only offered to pay two lakh rupees. This upset Abdul, who then upped his demand to five lakh rupees as tribute. On the night of 13 September, Gajpat Singh of Jind told the nawab that it would be impossible to get money from Desu Singh, and suggested a plan to get the money from him. The plan involved Abdul Ahad arresting all of the sardars as a ploy to get Desu to pay-up. Diwan Nanun Mal, Maha Singh, Ram Dayal, Gajpat Singh, and Desu Singh were all then arrested but still Desu refused to pay-up, as reported by Taj Muhammad Khan. Desu Singh and eight of his associates were then placed in confinement. On 14 September, the Mughal official informed Desu Singh that he was to withdraw from the taluqa he had captured as the Mughal Emperor was to rule it directly. Abdul Ahad also inquired about the whereabouts of weapons and loot that was captured from his late brother, Abul Qasim Khan, whom was killed-in-action after his defeat on 11 March 1776, reprimanding Desu Singh for being a plunderer. Desu Singh responded that he had already used what was captured before on his army and he had no money.

An agreement was finally reached between Desu and the Mughal authorities: Desu Singh's diwan was to pay five lakhs as tribute and 1.25 lakhs as expenses. The condition for this was that the estates belonging to Desu Singh was to be confirmed by him through a royal rescript and were to be protected from Amar Singh of Patiala. It was eventually agreed that Desu Singh was to pay four lakhs as tribute, with three lakhs being immediately realized and as a payment for the remainder, Desu Singh's son, Lal Singh, was taken captive by the Mughals. Desu Singh left the Mughal camp on 26 September 1776. Desu Singh died around a year later in September 1780. (Note: Lepel Henry Griffin states that 1781 was the year Desu Singh died.) Desu Singh was survived by at-least two sons, Bahal Singh and Lal Singh (both being half-brothers with different mothers).

=== Under Lal Singh ===
In circa 1780–1781, Desu Singh died and was succeeded by his son, Lal Singh. After Desu Singh's death, his widow sent representatives to prime minister Najaf Khan to secure the release of Lal Singh from prison. However, Amar Singh of Patiala threatened the Kaithal widow for negotiating directly with the Mughal court of Delhi. Amar Singh of Patiala instigated the other widow of Desu Singh to capture all of the assets of the late ruler, whilst also advocating against the release of Lal Singh. She gave control over the assets and property she had seized to her own son, Bahal Singh. Najaf Khan ordered a 50,000 rupee payment to secure the release of Lal Singh. However, Lal Singh's mother did not have the necessary funds so she threatened her co-wife with a dagger to give her the necessary funds, threatening to kill her otherwise. The mother of Bahal Singh paid 1,000 ashrafis (equivalent to 20,000 rupees) immediately, promising to pay-out another 20,000 rupees in a few days and the remaining 10,000 was to be paid by subscription.

On 4 October 1780, Lal Singh was moved into the custody of Najaf Quli, as ordered by Najaf Khan. Najaf Quli was instructed to release Lal Singh if the 50,000 payment request was fulfilled. However, the Patiala representative, Darbari Mal, stated to the wazir that if he would delay the release of Lal Singh for ten-days, he would be able to retrieve an additional 20,000 rupees as ransom. Thus, the Nawab took custody of Lal Singh from Najaf Quli again. However, the diwan of Najaf Quli, Shiv Ram, argued for the release of Lal Singh for 50,000 rupees. Lal Singh's mother paid-out 50,000 rupees in early November 1780 and Lal Singh was finally released from Mughal custody on 11 November 1780. Ishar Singh was the guide and guard of Lal Singh as he travelled to Kaithal after his release.

In 1795, Nana Rao Maratha of the Maratha Confederacy invaded the territories of the cis-Sutlej Sikh chiefs, including that of Bhanga Singh of Thanesar State. Some Sikh chiefs who were against Bhanga Singh attempted to provoke Lal Singh to recapture Thanesar, as his father Desu had originally captured the city. When Lal Singh declined to do so, the Sikh chiefs who attempted to persuade him then instigated Nana Rao Maratha to extract a heavy tribute from Lal Singh, claiming that he was a man of wealth. Nana Rao Maratha set-up his administration at Thanesar and marched westward to Thana. He sent a notification to Lal Singh to pay-up but the Kaithal ruler objected to this. Lal Singh rallied his army and requested an alliance with Patiala State. His alliance request was received by prime minister bibi Sahib Kaur of Patiala (wife of Jaimal Singh Kanhaiya), whom was the sister of raja Sahib Singh. Sahib Kaur sent-out 2,000 Patiala troops to assist the cause of Lal Singh of Kaithal, with the force attacking Nana Rao Maratha at night. Due to the night-attacks by the Kaithal-Patiala forces, a lack of food and water for his troops due to his supply-route from being cut-off, Nana Rao Maratha retreated to Delhi.

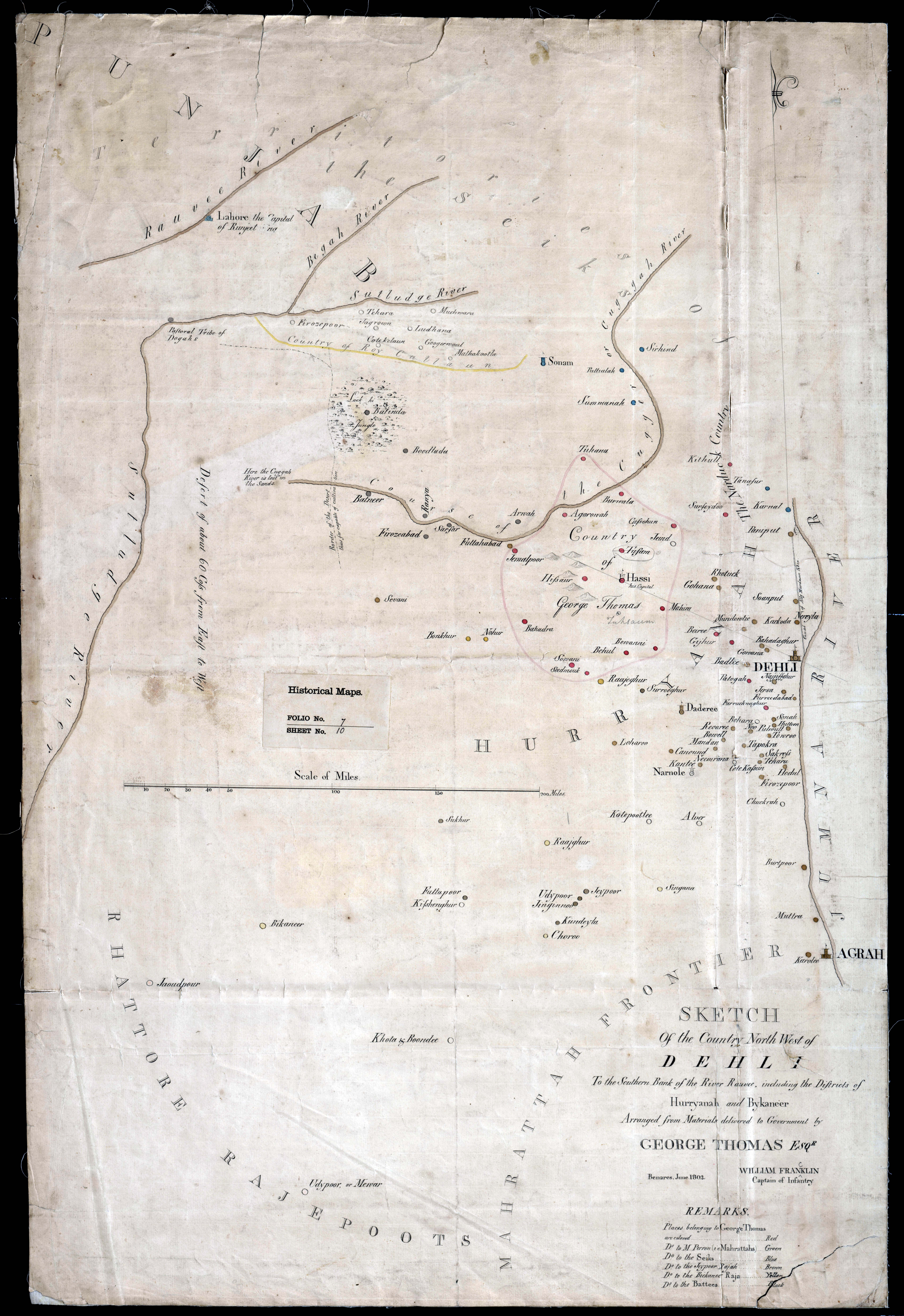
Sketch of the country northwest of Dehli to the southern bank of the Ravi River, including the districts of Haryana and Bikaner, by William Francklin, June 1802. The territory of George Thomas is shown alongside the location of Kaithal.

George Thomas, an Irishman, had set-up his own state based in Hansi, vying to become the ruler of the Haryana region. George Thomas' polity reached the border of Jind State. In November 1798, George Thomas launched an invasion of Jind, leading its rulers to reach-out to both Kaithal and Patiala states for assistance repelling the forces of the Irishman. In the beginning of December 1798, Lal Singh left for Jind whilst leading an army to help garrison and repel the invaders. The joint Jind-Kaithal forces were successfully able to defend Jind in the ensuing conflict on 10 December 1798, with losses on George Thomas' side consisting of four killed horses and many casualties and fatalities amongst his troops whilst they were entrenched. Lal Singh was petitioning raja Sahib Singh of Patiala to join the cause to defend Jind from George Thomas. Finally, after a siege lasting five months, George Thomas retreated from Jind and the invasion ceased.

Daulat Rao Sindhia of the Marathas controlled Delhi, Gurgaon, Rewari, Rohtak, Risar, and Sirsa, with his French general, Louis Bourquin, holding Delhi. A joint force of the Sikh chiefs and Louis Bourquin were able to successfully defeat and expel George Thomas, ending his independent polity. Kaithal State was a tributary to the Scindhia dynasty of the Maratha Empire, until the Second Anglo-Maratha War of 1803–1805, after which the Marathas lost this tributary to the British. After the eruption of the Second Anglo-Maratha War, general Gerard Lake of the British forces visited Delhi. Lal Singh of Kaithal had a belief that the British would best the Marathas in the ongoing war and come-out victorious. Thus, Lal Singh travelled to Jind where he met with raja Bhag Singh of Jind, requesting him to join the British side. General Lake afterwards would defeat the Marathas under Louis Bourquin at the Battle of Delhi (1803) on 11 September 1803, seizing Delhi on 13 September the same month. Lord Lake recognized the allegiance of Lal Singh to the British during the war, therefore he bestowed upon the Kaithal ruler a sanad (letter of authority) recognizing Lal Singh's control over Faridpur and Barsat parganas.

Other Sikh chiefs of the area would launch raids into the Ganges-Yamuna Doab, which was under British control by this point. Throughout the year 1804, such raids by Sikhs were occurring on the British territory. Lal Singh had convinced Bhag Singh of Jind State to ally with the British, with Bhag Singh in-turn trying to convince Baghel Singh to-do the same. Thus, the three Sikh chiefs were in the service of General Gerard Lake and Colonel David Ochterlony for a few months. Bhag Singh and Lal Singh assisted Colonel Burn with countering the Sikh and Maratha raids on the Ganges-Yamuna Doab. After defeating the Sikh raiders, focus was then placed on defeating the Maratha raiders. Lal Singh and Bhag Singh were custodians of Saharanpur district, maintaining the administration there whilst Burn was away taking care of the Maratha threat. Various Sikh chiefs were threatening and causing nuisance to the British due to their pillaging raids inroading into British territory that was located on the other side of the Yamuna. On 18 December 1804, the joint forces of Lal Singh of Kaithal and Colonel Burn of the East India Company defeated the Sikh chiefs whom were pillaging British territory.

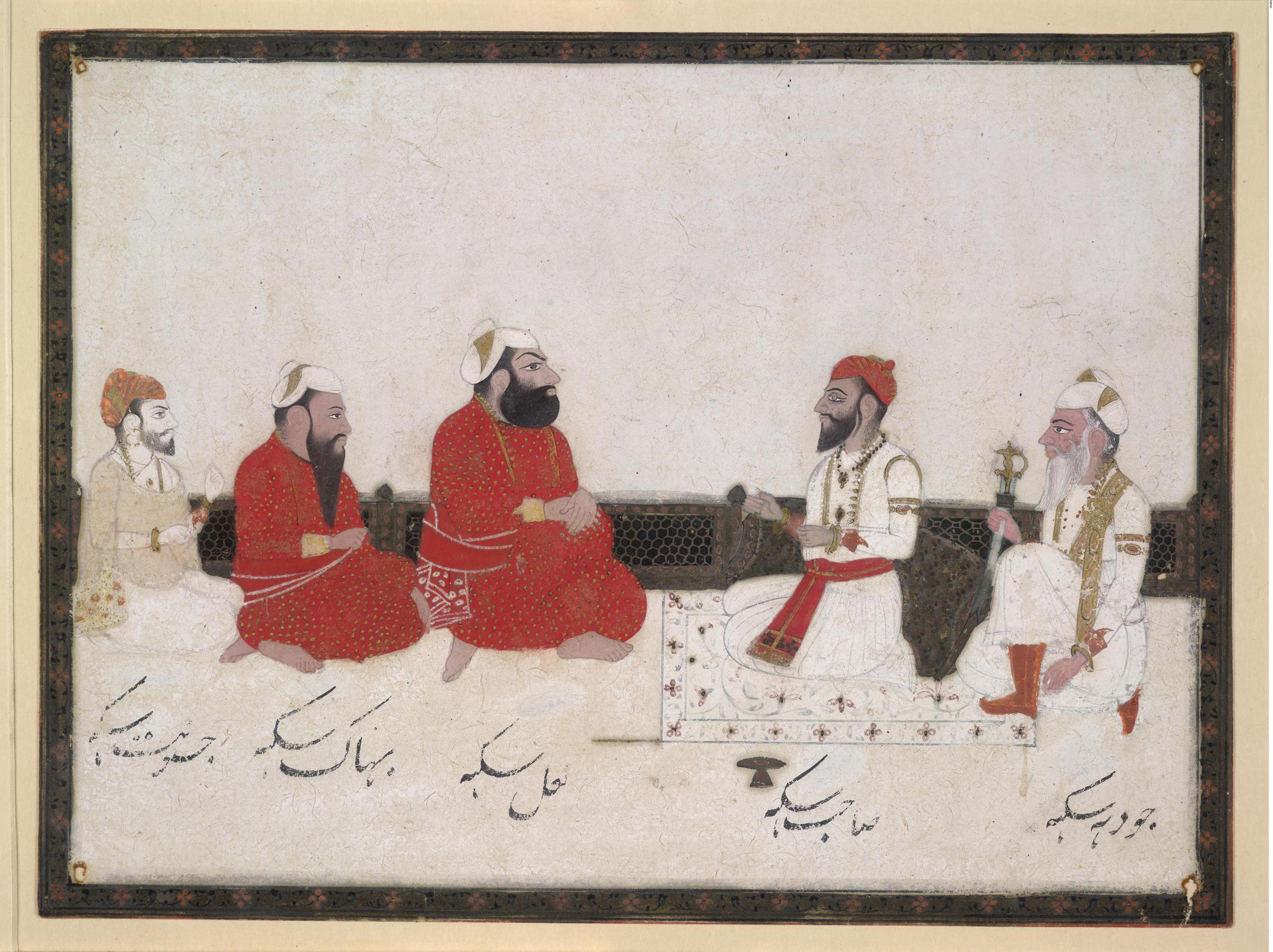
Painting depicting a meeting between Sahib Singh of Patiala State, Jodh Singh of Kalsia State, Lal Singh of Kaithal State, Mehak Singh, and raja Jaswant Rao Holkar, ca.1805

By 1808, Kaithal had come under British protection. In March 1808, Bhag Singh of Jind, Lal Singh of Kaithal, and an official associated with Sahib Singh of Patiala successfully managed to urge the British to take their states under their protection, as they were threatened by Ranjit Singh's Lahore State. These events led to the signing of the Treaty of Amritsar (1809). According to Lepel Henry Griffin, by the year 1809 (around the period of the British northward advance) Lal Singh of Kaithal had risen to become the second most powerful Cis-Sutlej Sikh chief, after Sahib Singh of Patiala. Griffin describes Lal Singh as follows:

Lai Singh was, at the time of British advance northwards, in 1809, the most powerful Cis-Satluj Chief, after the Raja of Patiala. He was a very able man, though utterly untrustworthy, and so violent and unscrupulous that the English authorities had the greatest difficulty in persuading him to maintain anything like order."

— Lepel Henry Griffin

At his polity's height, Lal Singh's revenue per annum was 225,000 rupees and his cavalry force was 600-strong. Lal Singh died in 1818.

=== Under Uday Singh ===
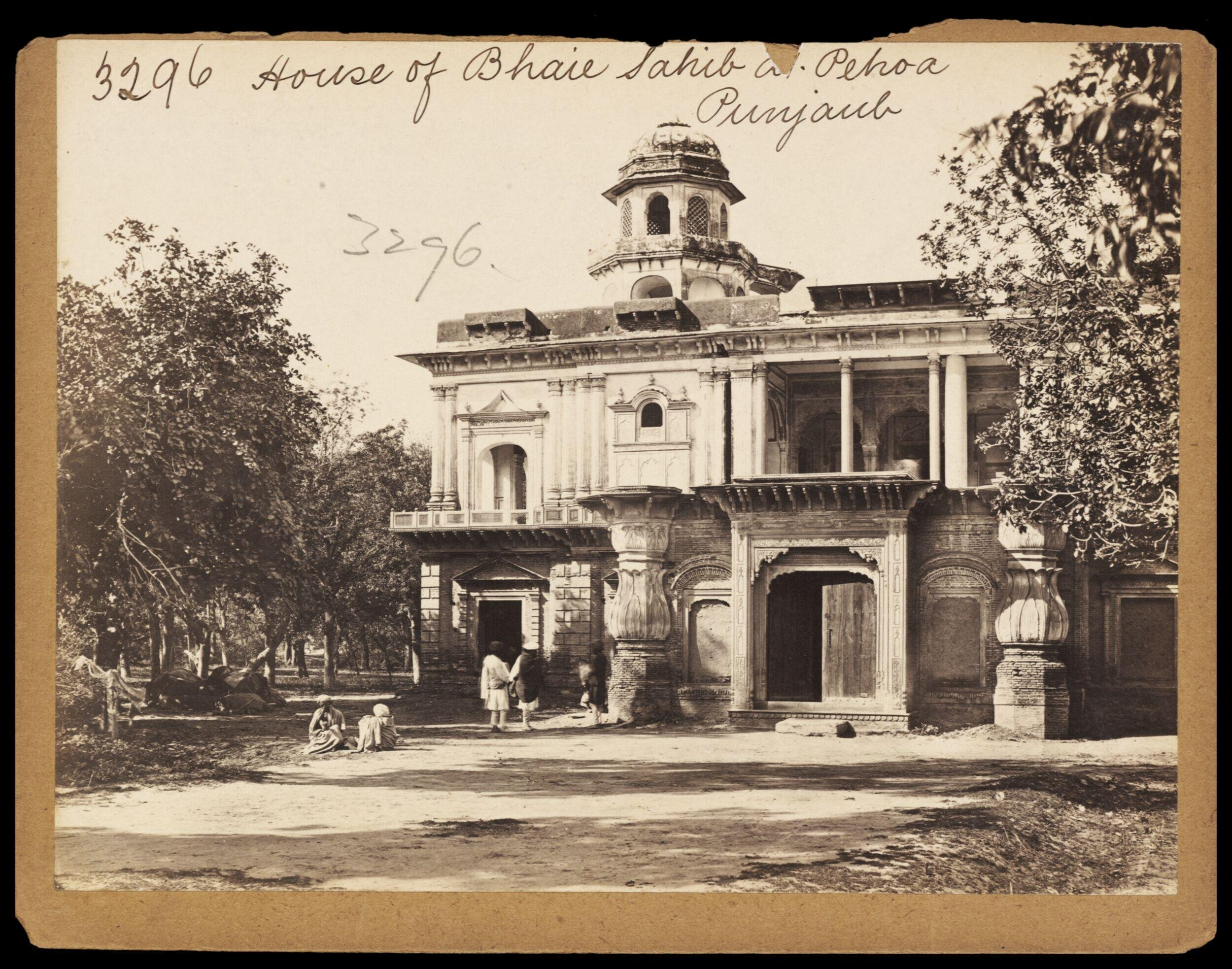
Photograph of the house of Bhai Uday Singh of Kaithal State, by Francis Frith, Pehowa, ca.1850's–70's

Uday ‌Singh ruled over Kaithal and proved‌ to be the last ruler. Uday Singh had two wives, Suraj Kaur (daughter of the raja of Ballabhgarh State) and Mehtab Kaur (daughter of a zamindar).

In 1829, Kavi Santokh Singh came under the sponsorship of the ruler of Kaithal state, Udai Singh. After being impressed by his work, the ruler bestowed a jagir grant, of the village of Morthali, to Santokh Singh in 1834. Uday Singh died on 14 or 15 March 1843. Uday Singh had no male issue at the time of his death.

=== Annexation by the British ===
After the death of Uday Singh, there was no heir to the throne of Kaithal but power passed onto Uday Singh's widow, Mai Sahib. For some time already, the British East India Company had been absorbing smaller Sikh states into its realm. Suraj Kaur, one of the two widows of Uday Singh would die shortly after but Mehtab Kaur survived for many years longer. Mehtab Kaur is also known as Mai Sahib. Mehtab Kaur wanted to be given control over the state of her late-husband, similar to how Rani Daya Kanwar of Ambala State was allowed to retain control over Ambala State. However, Mehtab Kaur's request to retain control was rejected by the British, with George Campbell stating that if there are no male issues, then daughters cannot inherit the state property but widowed wives can. Thus, Mai Sahib attempted to ignite an anti-British uprising.

The British political agent for the cis-Sutlej states was George Clark and his headquarter was located at Ambala. In-light of the opposition of the state's annexation by Uday Singh's widow, George Clark of the East India Company decided to annex Kaithal State by force. For the invasion of Kaithal State, the invading British force consisted of around 1,200 troops from the 31st Regiment, the 3rd Light Dragoons, and some Artillery forces under the command of Colonel Daniel Bolton, with Clark accompanying this force on its march to Kaithal (Kaithal was around 90 kilometres away from the British cantonment at Ambala). The widowed rani of Kaithal State and commander Teg Singh readied the defenses of Kaithal, which at that period of time was a small town that was fortified by a tall, brick wall.

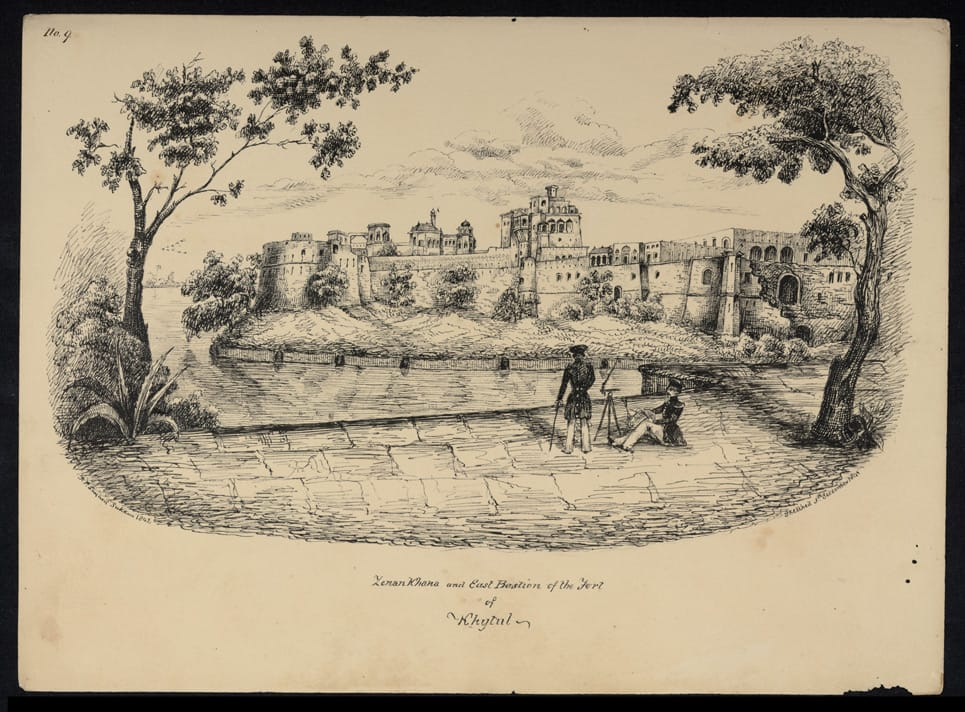
'Zenan Khana and East Bastion of the Fort of Khytul', the fort of Kaithal State, ca.1842.

The British army reached Kaithal on the third night of their journey, which was the night of 10 April 1843. The Kaithal forces appeared some distance away bearing matchlocks and lit-matchsticks, and threatening the British, which kept them on-guard the entire night, decreasing the morale of the British-side. The following morning, the Kaithal forces launched an assault on the British encampment. George Campbell states that this offensive routed the British forces, causing them to retreat back to Karnal. Thus, the initial British invasion of Kaithal proved unsuccessful in subduing the state. The British prepared a strong invasion force and were assisted by 1,000 horsemen and two guns that were led by the maharaja of Patiala State. The British launched another invasion on 15 April 1843, which was successful, with the decisive battle of the invasion having been fought near the present-day Jat School. In the aftermath, commander Teg Singh and other military-men of the former Kaithal State were arrested and Teg Singh's property was confiscated (including elephants, guns, and other items). Mehtab Kaur retired from Kaithal in light of this. The rani had escaped from Kaithal during the night after loading up treasure, transporting them by cart. The next morning, George Clark sent Colonel Bolton to catch-up to her but after an entire day of searching, they failed to locate her whereabouts or the treasure's. The search-party camped-out in a local jungle and returned to Kaithal the next day. Hari Ram Gupta believes the rani likely went to Arnauli. The British then allowed its soldiers to enter Kaithal Palace but commanded that anything found inside belongs to the British administration and was not to be taken by the troops. However, some treasures and other items were snuck out by individual troops, such as a dagger that was possibly studded with diamonds, which a British official managed to sneak out of the palace and escape its detection by searchers by wrapping the blade in rags and tying it around his leg. This account by this British official also discusses metal chairs that some of the men broke the legs off of to be used to play skittles with, discarding them afterwards. Another Britisher took one of the discarded chair legs and realized it was made out of pure silver.

In the aftermath of the lapsing of the state, the British confiscated and directly annexed the main portion of territory (including Kaithal locality itself) of the erstwhile state whilst a small portion was given to Gulab Singh of Arnauli, who was the second-cousin of Gurbaksh Singh, who had been the great-grandfather of the Kaithal chief. The larger portion of territory annexed by the British brought in 400,000 rupees per annum. The smaller portion of territory allocated to Gulab Singh fetched an annual revenue of 100,000 rupees. However, the Phulkian rulers of the states of Patiala, Nabha, and Jind were against this and thought the territory of the former state of Kaithal should be given to them due to the familial ties they possessed with the Kaithal ruling house. However, the British refused this request. The British dispatched a report to Queen Victoria on the capture of Kaithal and Henry Lawrence wrote an account of the area in his 1843 settlement report. Henry Lawrence was appointed to govern the district that formed resultive of the state's annexation.

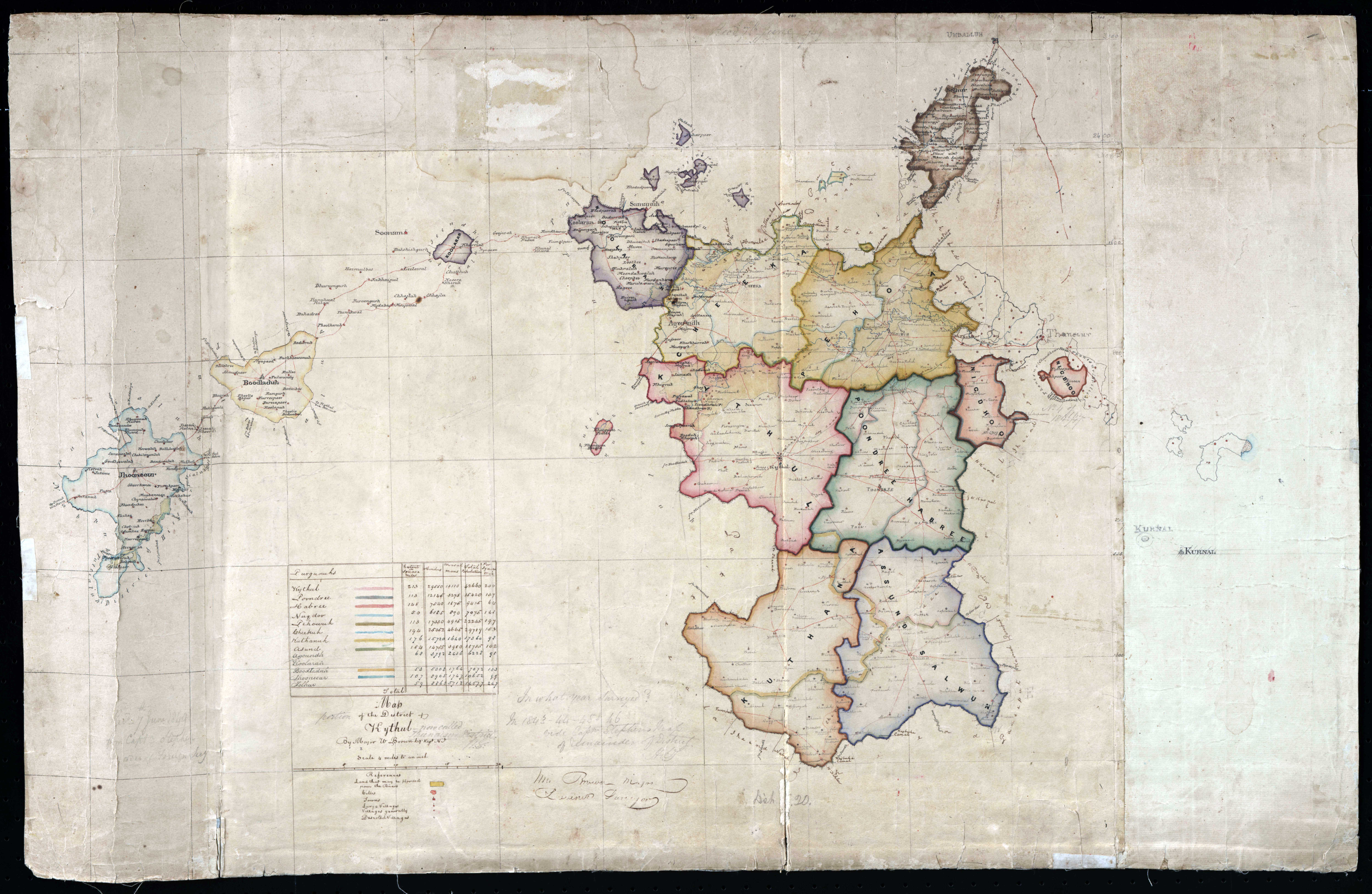
Map of Kaithal District, surveyed by William Brown just after the annexation of Kaithal State, 1843–46

After annexation, Henry Lawrence travelled to almost every village of the annexed territory between April–July 1843 and studied the records over a decennial period of time (last 10-years; 1833–43). After looking over the records, Lawrence noticed that land-revenue from farming in the former state was contracted out. Lawrence reformed this system by getting rid of the middle-men, abolishing some taxes and charges (such as the cattle tax), got rid of the practice of giving presents to officials, stopped the payments in grass and wood, and abolished forced labour. He additionally granted leases to the land-owners and cultivators. Furthermore, the local zamindars were made to build new water well and repair old ones. Lawrence introduced the cultivation of cotton, potatoes, sugar and timber trees. The sides of roads of the annexed territory were planted with trees under his instruction. Lawrence also donated large amounts of seed plants for plantations. The report of Lawrence on the area, titled Kurnaul, 10th November, 1843, Lawrence states that he made the summary settlement for a 3-year term. By the end of Lawrence's administration of Kaithal, criminality had decreased, offenders had been jailed or moved elsewhere, guns owned privately by the local population had been confiscated (with only one sword being allowed per ten-households). He further suggests to the British administration that the road network and drainage system of the annexed territory needed to be developed. Lawrence specifically recommends the construction of a canal as ground-water was located 60-to-100 cubits from the surface, leading the local inhabitants to find it burdensome to construct water-wells.

== List of rulers ==
No.	Name (Birth–Death)	Portrait	Reign	Ref.
1.	Desu Singh (Note: Desu Singh's forename can also be spelt as 'Desa'.) (died September 1780)		1767 – September 1780	
2.	Lal Singh		1781–1814 or 1818	
3.	Pratap Singh (Note: Pratap Singh's forename can also be spelt as 'Partap'.)		1814–1823	
4.	Uday Singh (Note: Uday Singh's forename can also be spelt as 'Udai' or 'Udey'.)		1823–1843	

== Monuments ==
Kaithal Fort, Bhai ki Haveli, Bhai ki Baoli, etc. built by the rulers of Kaithal State still stand today.

== Gallery ==
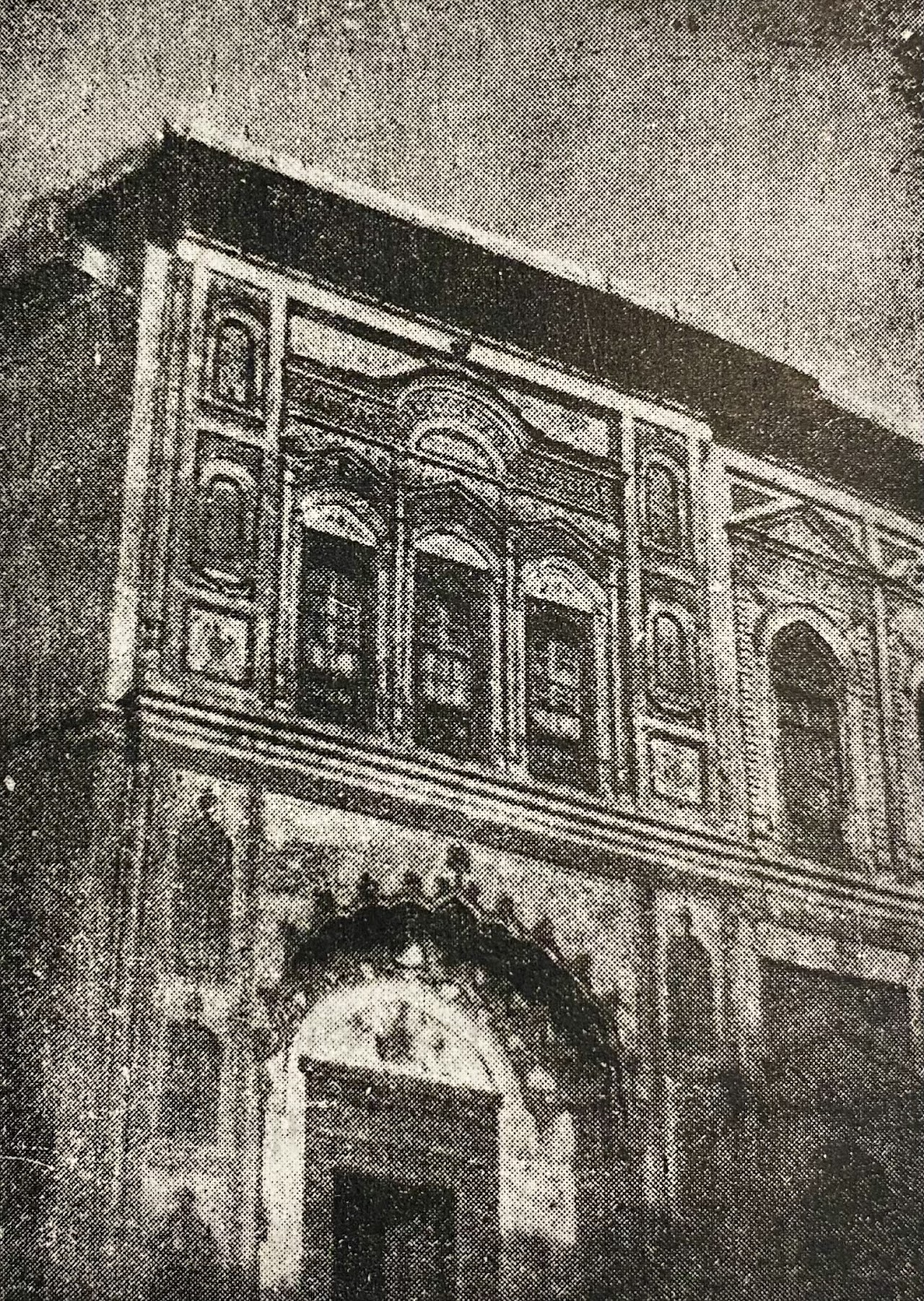
Photograph of Haveli Kavi Santokh Singh in Kaithal, taken by Vir Singh, ca.1920's

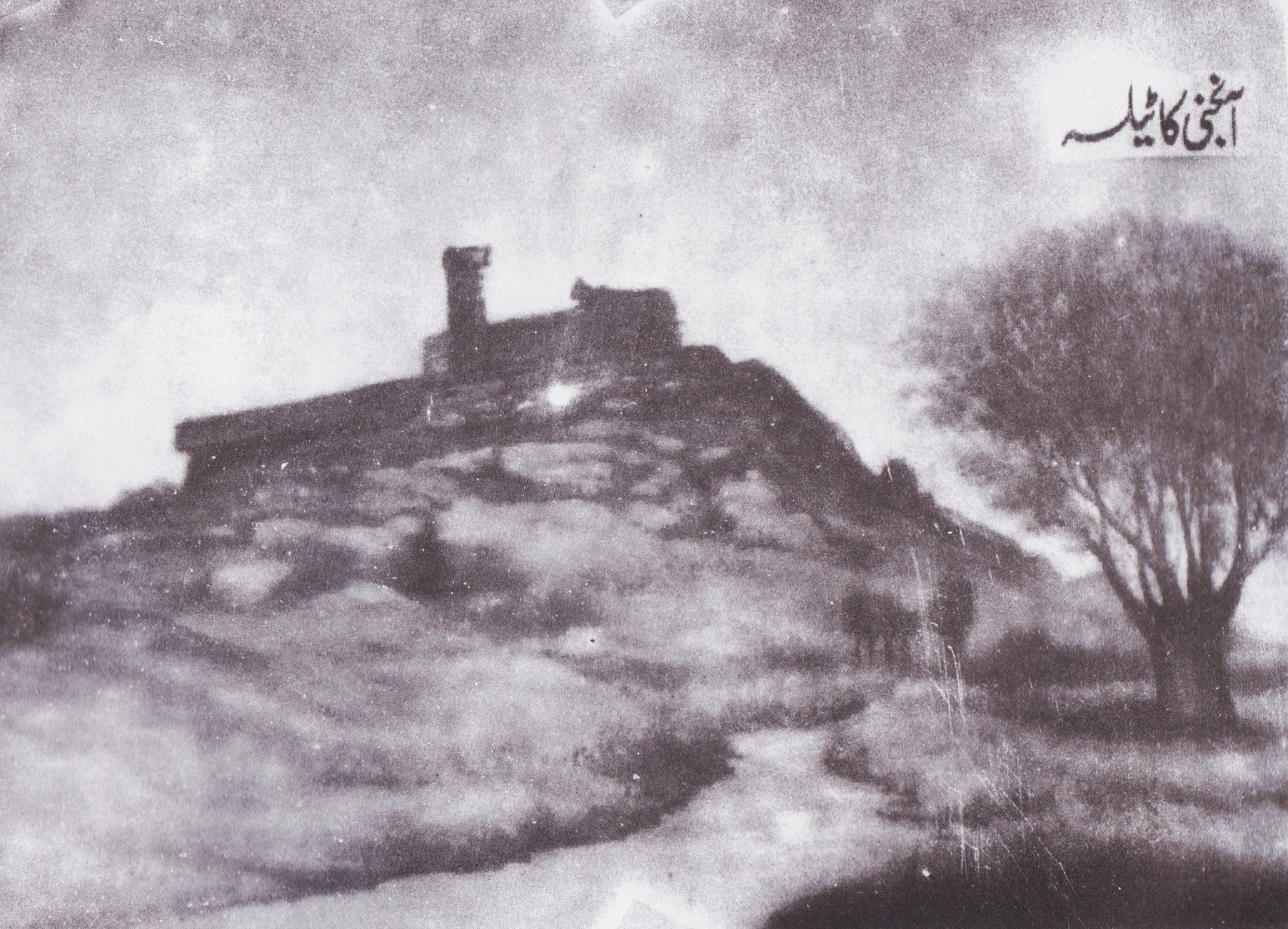
Anjani Ka Tilla in Kaithal

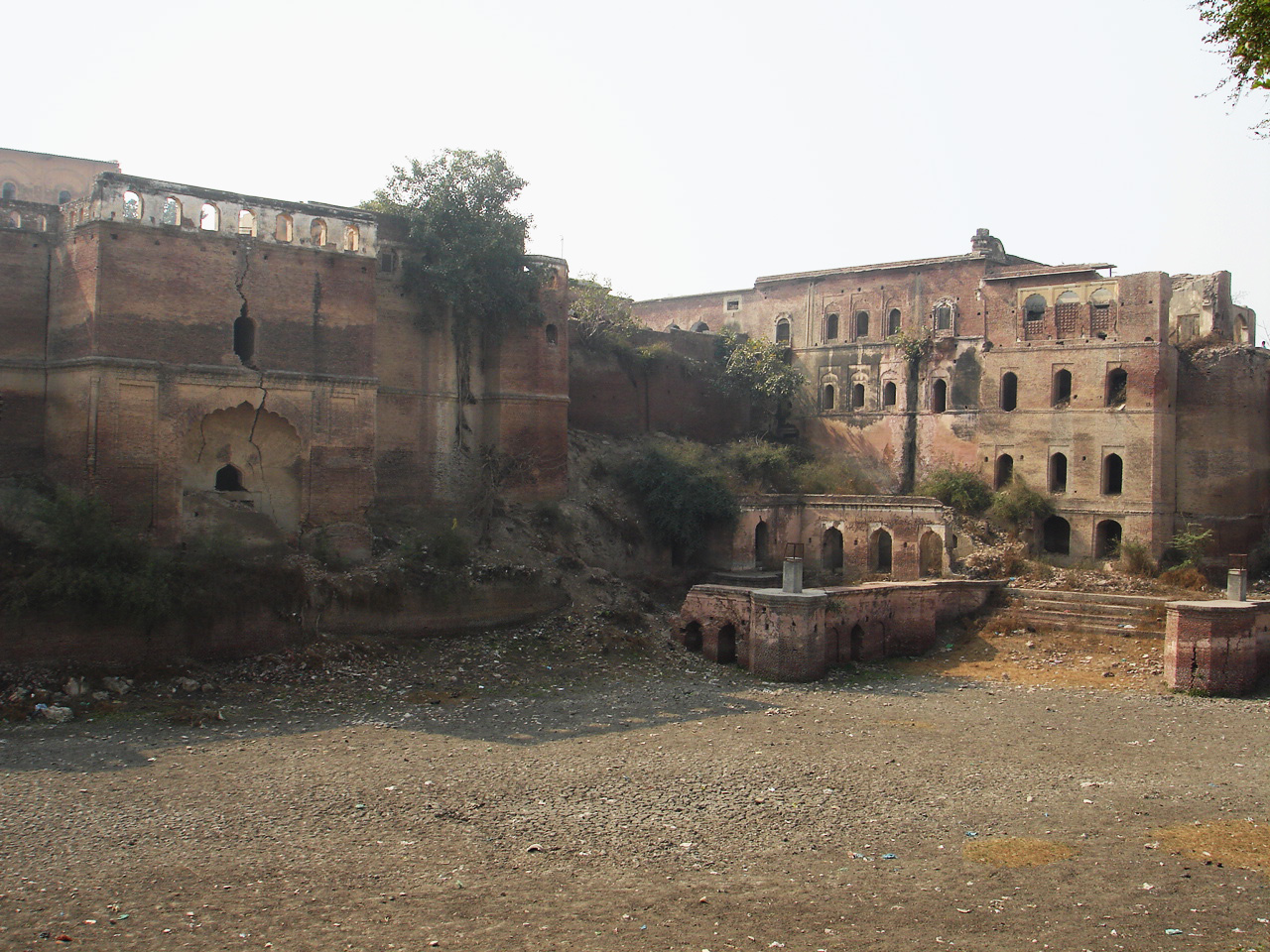
Ruins of the Kaithal fortress in present-day Haryana

Cis-Sutlej State including Kaithal state Map ca. 1829–35

Cis-Sutlej State including Kaithal state Map ca. 1829-35 Village details

=== Exclaves ===
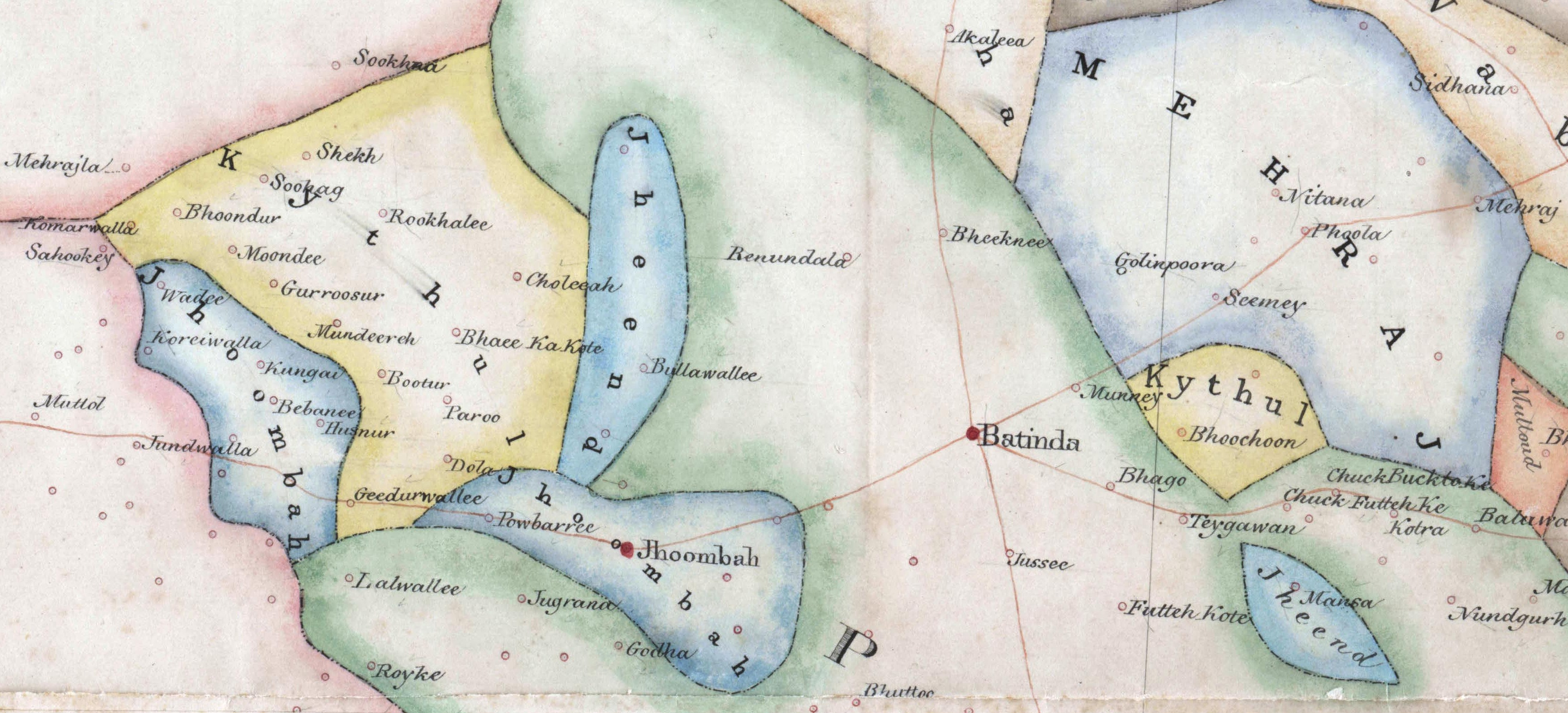
Kaithal State exclave near Bathinda & Giddarbaha exclave, ca. 1829-35 map by G. R. Clerk.

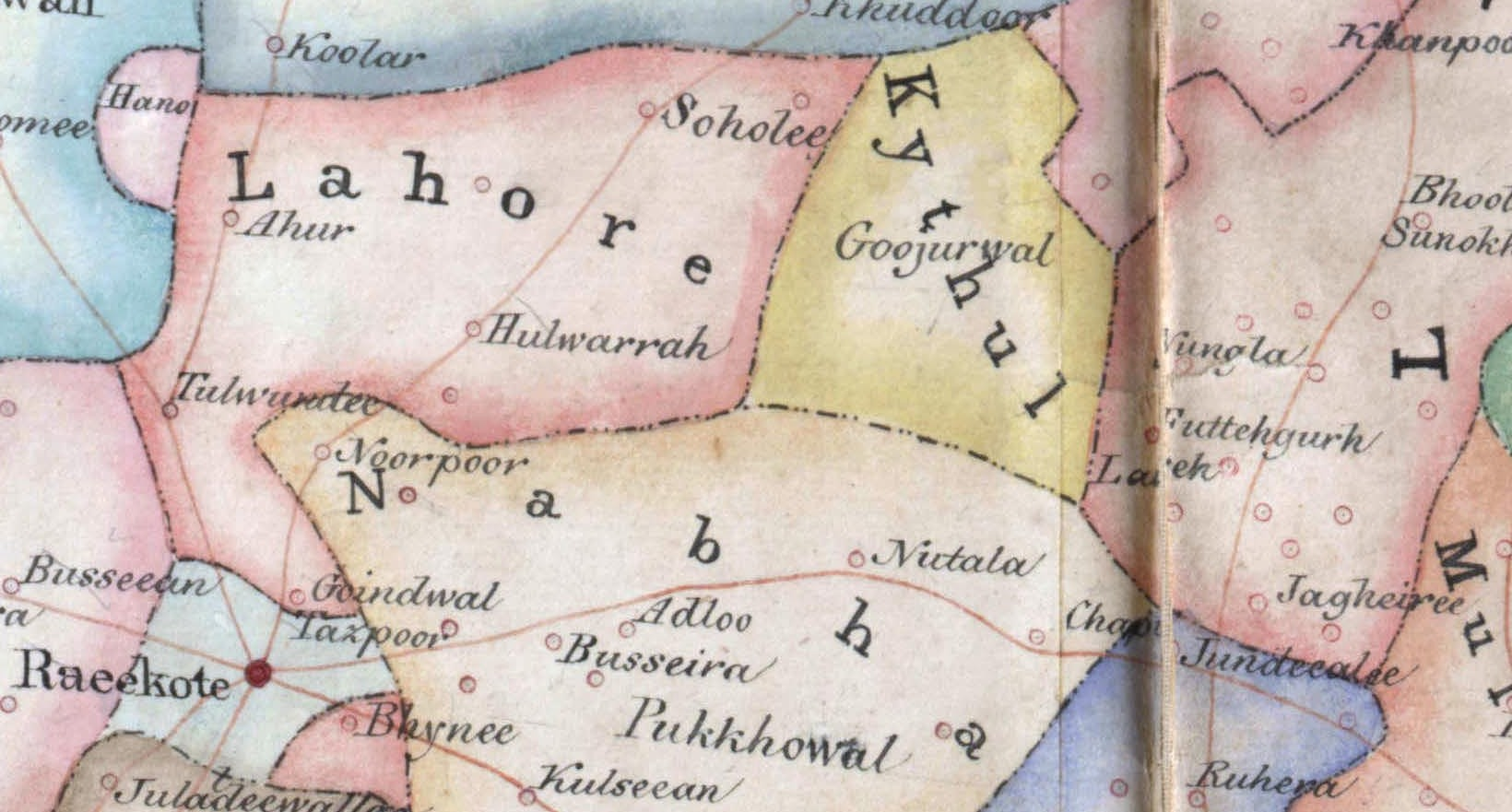
Kaithal State Gujarwal exclave near Raikot, Ludhiana ca. 1829-35 map by G. R. Clerk.

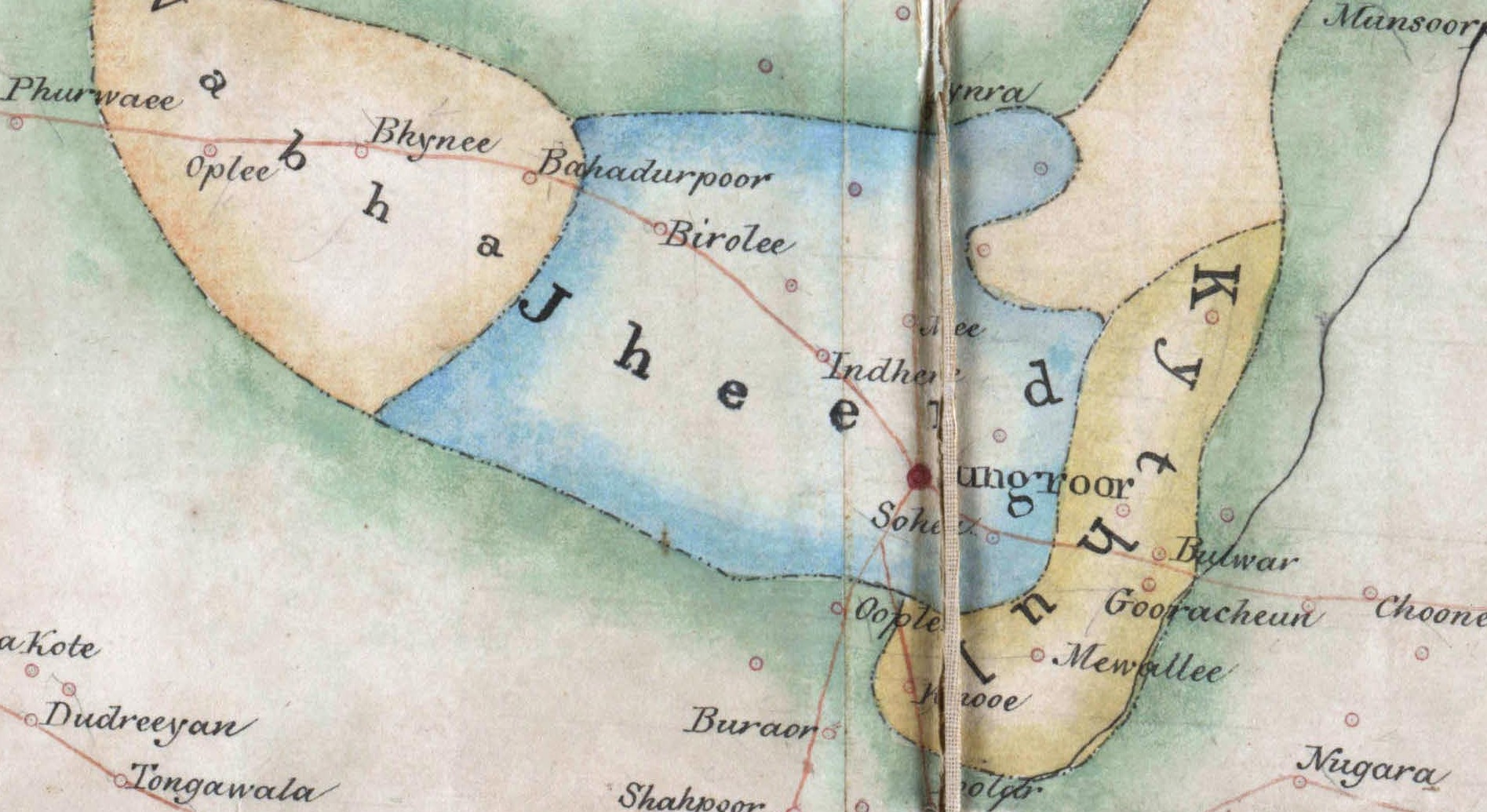
Kaithal State exclave near Sangrur, ca. 1829-35 map by G. R. Clerk.

== See also ==
- Ladwa State
- Cis-Sutlej states
- Jind State
- Delhi Territory
- Treaty of Amritsar (1809)
