= Ladwa State =

Sikh kingdom

- 1763–1846
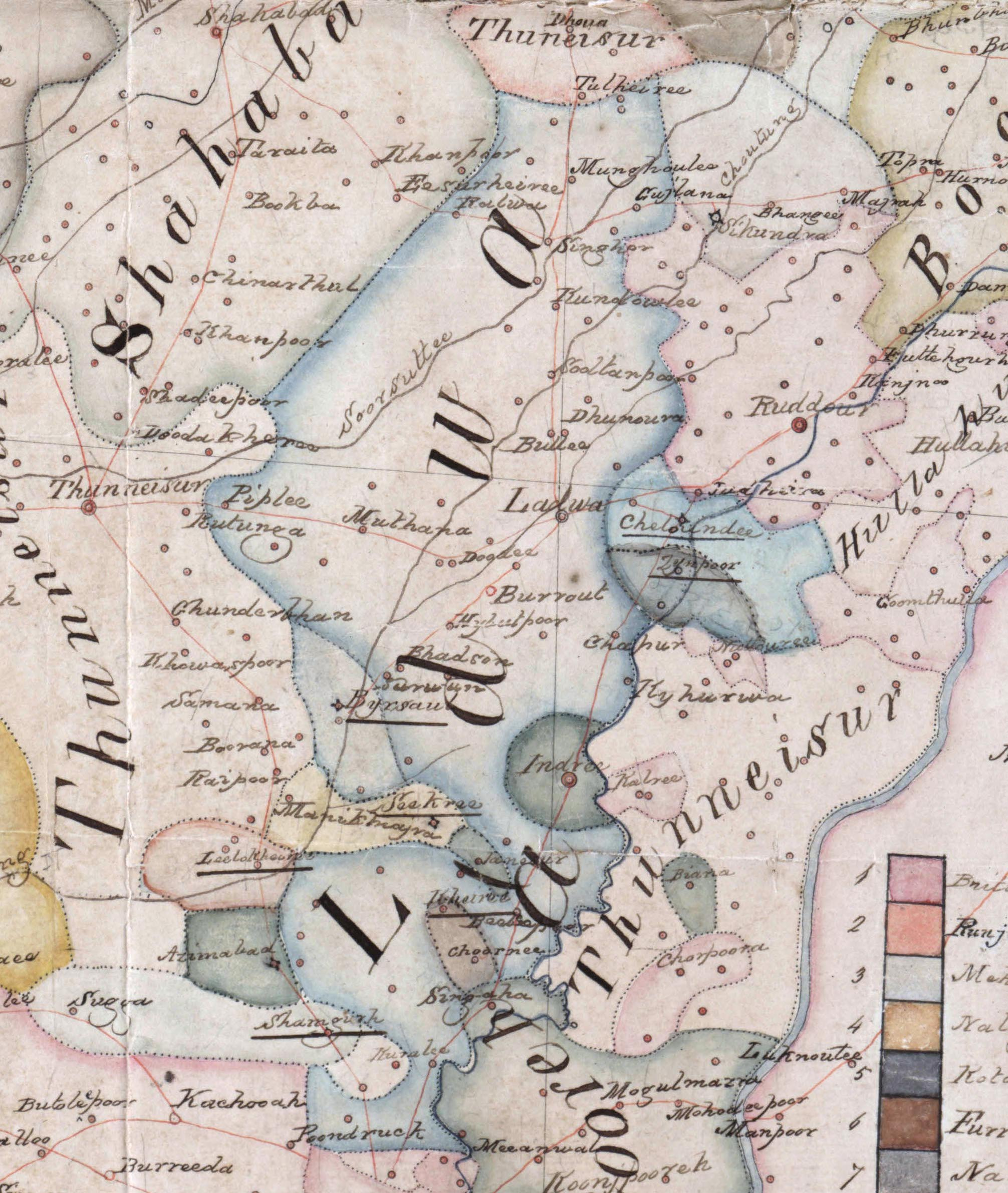
- Detail of the main, continuous tract of territory of Ladwa State from a map created by the British East India Company, ca.1829–1835 (not including its exclaves viewable on the full-map)
- Capital: Ladwa
- History
  - Established: 1763
  - Disestablished: 1846
- Today part of: Haryana, India

Ladwa State was a Sikh kingdom. It was one of the Cis-Sutlej states. The state is notable for being one of the few Sikh polities south of the Sutlej that actively sided with the Sikh Empire against the British.

== History ==
=== Establishment and rule by Gurdit Singh ===
In the power-vacuum that formed in the aftermath of the fall of Sirhind and the downfall of the Marathas in the region due to the Third Battle of Panipat, the Sikhs were an ascending force in the area. In circa 1763, Gurdit Singh seized the localities of Ladwa and Shamgarh. Gurdit Singh would later wrest control of the territories of George Thomas. During the reign of Gurdit Singh, Ladwa State and its dependencies had an annual revenue of 204,700 rupees. Gurdit Singh of Ladwa joined forces with the other Sikh chiefs of the region, such as Sher Singh of Buria, Roy Singh of Jagadhri, Mehtab Singh of Thanesar, Jodh Singh of Kalsia, and Karam Singh Shahidi, to launch raids into British-controlled territory. In 1804, Colonel Burn routed the Sikh forces of Ladwa State and Thanesar State. In the following year in 1805, British forced marched upon the fortress of Karnal, capturing it from Gurdit Singh of Ladwa. Gurdit Singh of Ladwa and Bhanga Singh of Thanesar had supported the Marathas, thus the British took measures to punish them.

=== Under Ajit Singh and annexation ===
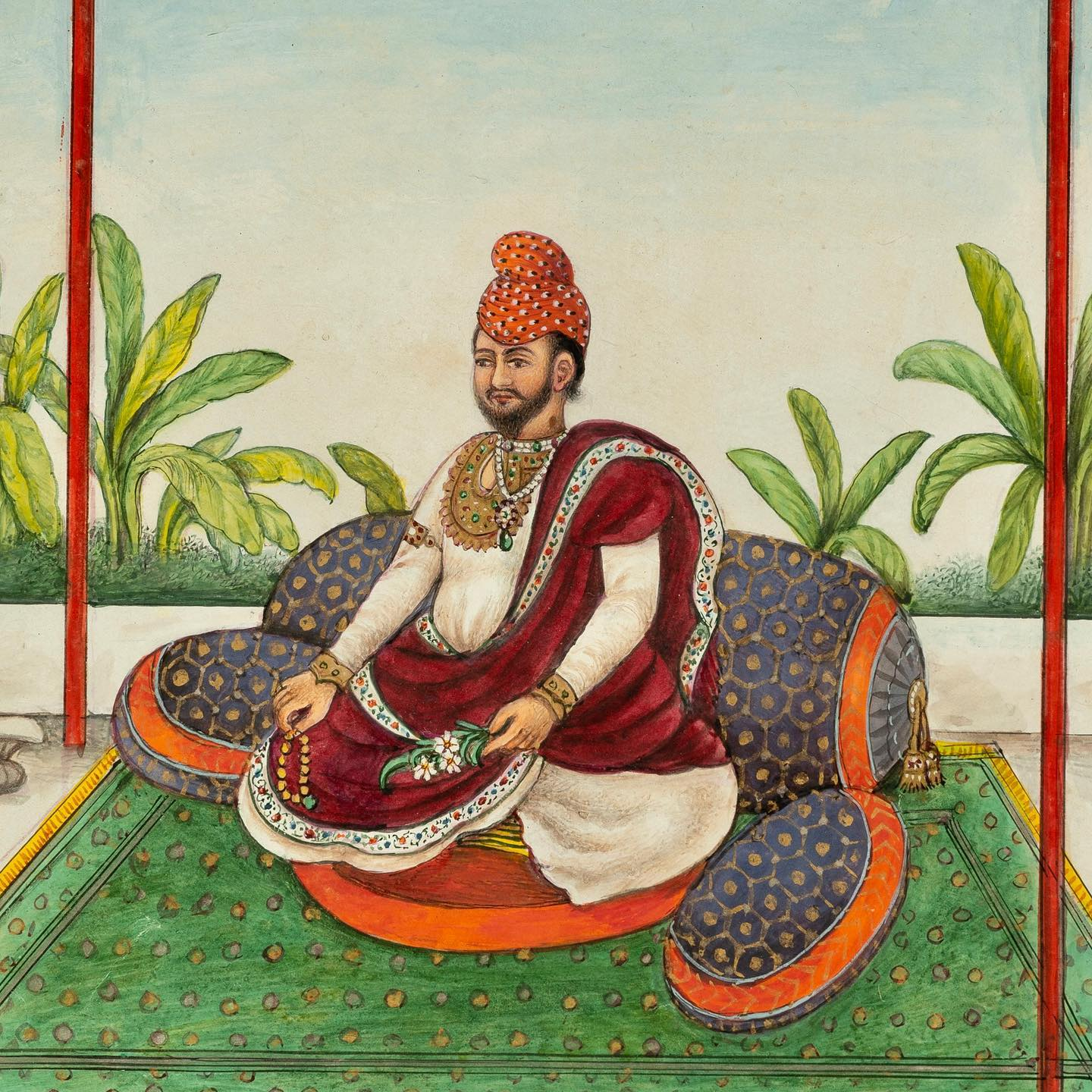
Detail of a painting of Ajit Singh of Ladwa State, from the Tazkirat Al-Umara of James Skinner, ca.1836

Ajit Singh of Ladwa was of an anti-British disposition and had cordial relations with Ranjit Singh. The Sikh Empire's court chronicler, Sohan Lal Suri, mentions in his Umdat-ut-Tawarikh that Ajit Singh of Ladwa had made plans to visit Lahore in November. (Note: Umdat-ut-Tawarikh, part V, page 259) By 1845, the British grew increasingly irritated by Ajit Singh and placed him under surveillance at Sahranpur, declaring him a "rebel". The British charged Ajit Singh of Ladwa with corruption and mismanagement, suggesting that he should be removed. Ajit Singh escaped his confinement and teamed-up with Ranjodh Singh Majithia during the First Anglo-Sikh War, with both crossing the Sutlej at Phillaur with a force of 8,000 men and 70 guns. Their joint-force took control over Fatehgarh, Dharamkot, Gangarana, and Baddowal. Ladwa State was one of the only Cis-Sutlej states that actively sided with the Lahore State against the British during the First Anglo-Sikh War. The joint forces of the states of Ladwa and Lahore burnt a portion of the Ludhiana cantonment. In the aftermath, the British marched upon Karnal and annexed the polity in 1846. The reason the British annexed the state was due to pro-Lahore activities during the war.

== List of rulers ==
No.	Name (Birth–Death)	Portrait	Reign	Ref.
1.	Gurdit Singh		1763–?	
2.	Ajit Singh		?–1846	

== Gallery ==
1843 Map of the Cis-sutlej states Including Ladwa state

1843 Map of the Cis-sutlej states Including Ladwa state with village level details

=== Exclaves ===
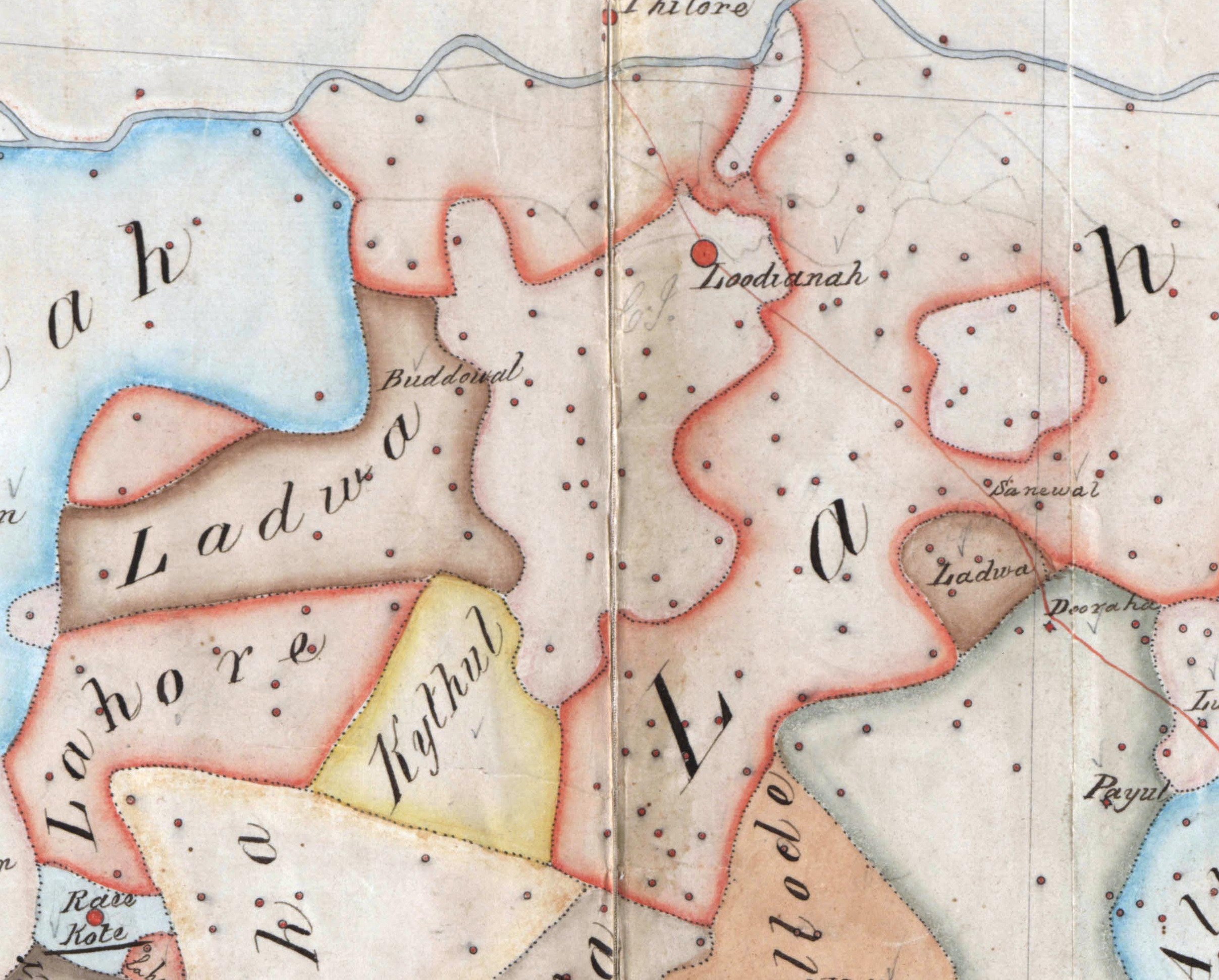
Ladwa State northern exclaves, in the Ludhiana District near Sanewal & Buddowal enclave.

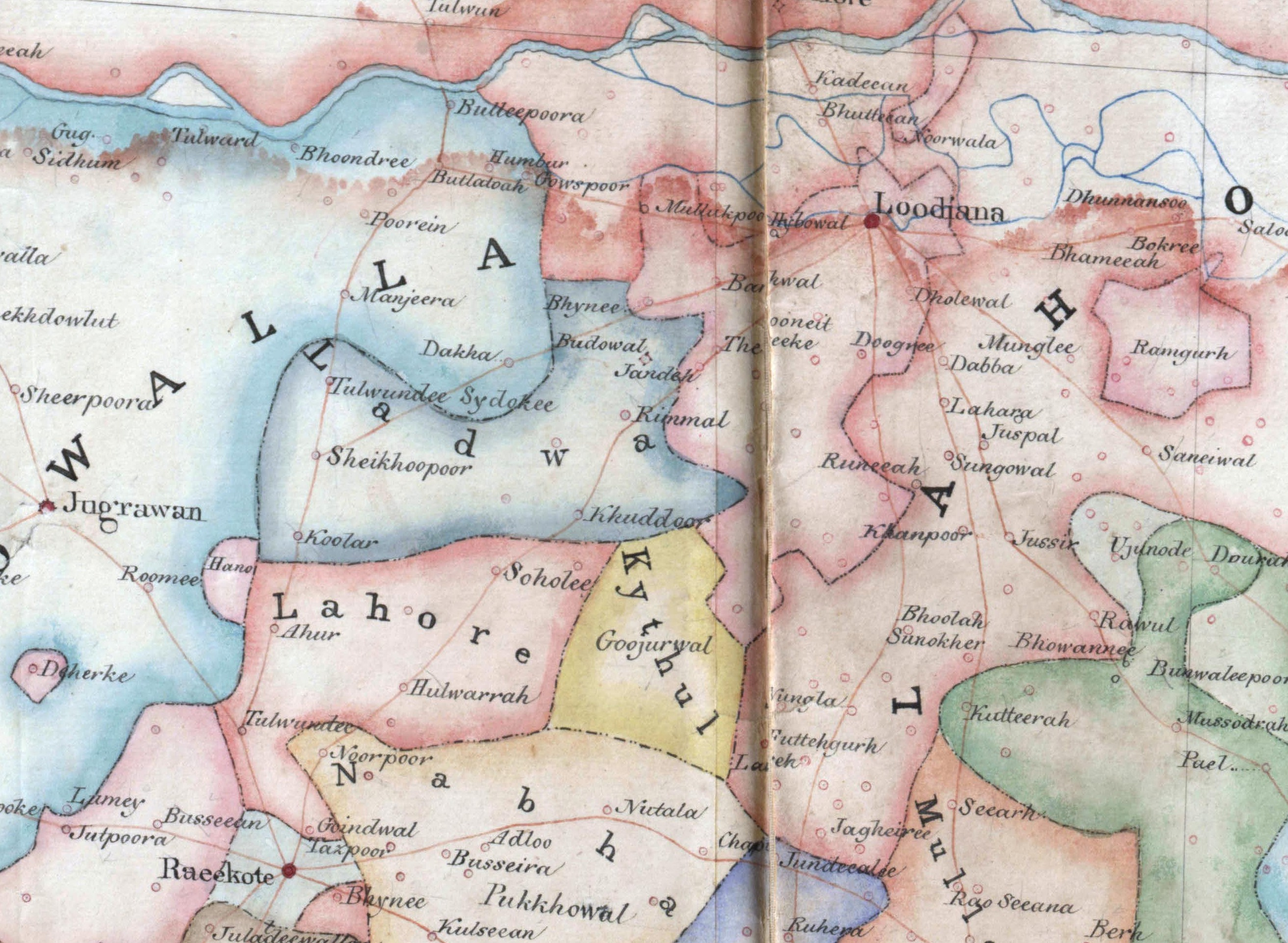
Ladwa State northern exclaves, in the Ludhiana District near Sanewal & Buddowal enclave with details of village.

== See also ==
- Cis-Sutlej states
- Treaty of Amritsar (1809)
- Ferozepore (jagir)
