= Bibi Pardhan Kaur =

Sikh princess (1718–1789)

Pardhan Kaur (1718–1789) was a Sikh woman from the ruling Phulkian dynasty of Patiala who became a religious figure. She was the daughter of Ala Singh, founder of Patiala. She later became the disciple of Nikka Singh. She founded five dharamshalas across Punjab.

== Life ==
She was the daughter of Ala Singh, the first ruler of Patiala, and Mai Fatto. She had three brothers, Sardul Singh, Bhuma Singh, and Lal Singh. She was married to Sham Singh Randhawa of Ramdas village in Amritsar district. (Note: Some sources give the name of her husband as 'Mohar Singh Randhawa'.) However, she became widowed shortly after and returned to her parental home. Other sources claim the couple had given birth to a son named Bhup Singh, who died in childbood, with the couple fighting afterwards and becoming separated after the husband took-on a second wife.

After her return to her parental home at Barnala, Pardhan became more religious. Her father, Ala Singh, granted her a jagir estate and dispatched a knowledgeable Nirmala named Bhai Nikka Singh (disciple of Bhai Langar Singh) to guide Pardhan Kaur regarding the Guru Granth Sahib, teaching her both Sanskrit and Punjabi. Pardhan Kaur offered the patta of a land-grant of thirty villages to Nikka Singh. A dera and gurdwara were established by for Bhai Nikka Singh. Bhai Nikka Singh was succeeded by Bhai Gandha Singh. Pardhan Kaur founded a Sikh religious school (pathshala) for children at Barnala. She also established a langar. It is said that she authored a Bhakha commentary on the Sanskrit work Yoga Vaśiṣṭha. The motto used in her personal seal was nām jape seī pardhān ("he alone who spends his time repeating God's Name is the ranked one"). At least five dharamshalas were constructed by her, namely at Barnala, Malerkotla, Jagraon, Raikot, and Patiala.

She also played a role, alongside Rani Khem Kaur, Thamman Singh Dhaliwal, and Hamir Singh, in the imprisonment of the diwan Nanu Mal.

Pardhan died in 1789. According to Sardar Singh Bhatia, she died in 1792 at Sekha.

== Legacy ==
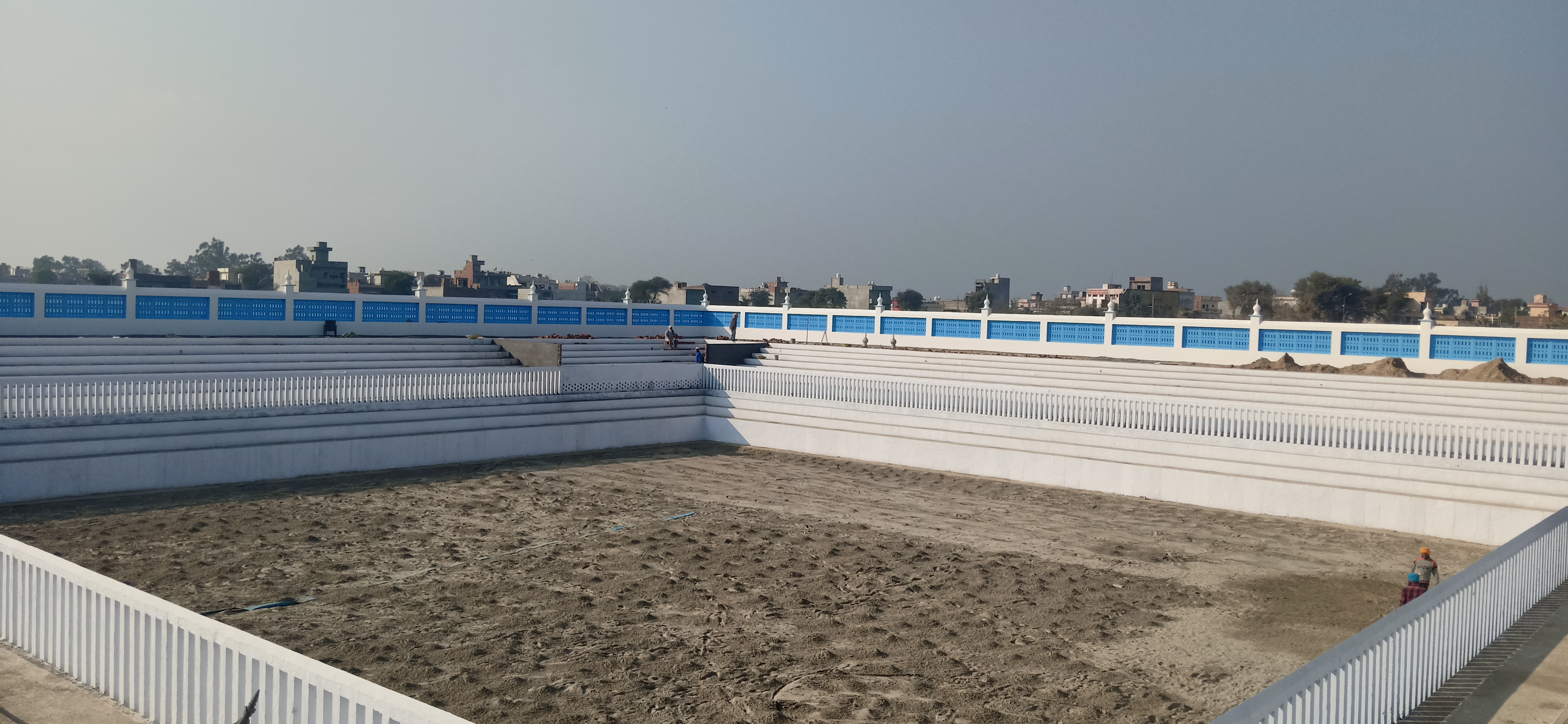
Sarovar of Gurdwara Tap Asthan Bibi Pardhan Kaur in Barnala district

A samadh dedicated to her can be found at Sekha. The school established by her at Barnala continued in-operation for a long time but recently closed. The dharamshala she had constructed at Barnala for Bhai Nikka Singh is now Dera Baba Gandha Singh.
