= Mai Fatto =

First Rani Consort of Patiala (1698–1773)

Mai Fatto (1698–1773), also known as Fateh Kaur, was the wife of Ala Singh of Patiala. She was paternal grandmother of Amar Singh. She is not to be confused with another Fateh Kaur (alias Fatto), who was the daughter of Phul Sidhu-Brar whom married a relative of Baba Buddha named Dhanna Singh. She played a prominent role in the establishment of Patiala State, alongside her husband and the first ruler of Patiala, Ala Singh.

== Biography ==
Fatto was the daughter of Khanan of Kaleke village, located near Dhanoula. She had two brothers, Haria and Sana, who established Kamalpur. An early account of her life is as follows: in 1698, Bhai Dayal Das, who belonged to the lineage of Bhai Bhagtu, visited Kaleke where a newborn baby girl was born in the house of Khanan. The family was disappointed by the birth of a girl-child in their household and they carried-out an attempt at female-infanticide by burying her alive. Bhai Dayal Das was invited to visit the household of Khanan, which was extended to him in an attempt to clear the household's sins after committing female-infanticide. However, Dayal Das came to learn about the event and refused the invitation, stating that he did not visit families who practice female-infanticide. Khanan was shocked and apologized for his actions, with the girl-child Fatto quickly being unburied and was still alive, bringing relief to Dayal Das, who then agreed to visit Khanan's house to dine. Dayal Das requested the family to raise Fatto well and predicted that she would become a notable personality. Due to her life being saved by Dayal Das, Fatto felt a sense of indebtedness to the family of Dayal Das for the rest of her life. She became politically-gifted and educated in Sikh history and literature. She is said to have cared for orphans and the disfortunate.

When Ala Singh was 16 years old, he married Mai Fatto. Mai Fatto was aged nine at the marriage. She assisted Ala Singh throughout his life as a ruler and she also served in the langar (communal-kitchen), serving members of the Dal Khalsa. In-fact, she played a role in maintaining a langar that had been established by her husband. Her activities in the langar communal kitchen, which attracted Sikhs of the Dal Khalsa, helped strengthen her husband's network with other Sikh chiefs. Whenever Ala Singh wanted to contact a member of the Dal Khalsa, it would be through Fatto as Fatto had extensive ties due to her relation with the family descended from Bhai Bhagtu. It was Fatto who convinced Ala Singh to undergo the pahul and become a baptized Khalsa Sikh from Nawab Kapur Singh at Thikriwala village. One tale narrates that when Mai Fatto was serving in the langar, a Sikh who was eating complained about the dāl (pulses) that were being served were too watery and therefore poured hot dāl over the head of Fatto, which scolded her head. When Fatto protested to her husband about what had happened, he remarked that she should be grateful to the Sikh, as if she was caught by the Mughals, they would have poured burning oil over her head, and that having hot dal being poured on her head was small in-comparison.

Via Fatto, Ala Singh was able to forge an alliance with the family of Dayal Das, as per the Kaifiat-i-Bhai Kiyan. During any periods of trouble, Fatto and her husband would visit the family of Dayal Das (known as Bhais) at Bhuchuke village for consultation. Dayal Das had a son named Gurbaksh Singh, who was the founder of Kaithal State and also assisted Ala Singh with the conquests of Boha, Buddhlada, Tobana, and Jamalpur. Through his marriage to Fatto, Ala Singh was connected to her cousin Gurbaksh Singh Kaleke, who helped him with founding the settlement of Patiala. When Bhai Mool Chand asked Ala Singh to donate money to a needy Brahmin, he obtained funds from Mai Fatto in-order to do so. After the donation, Bhai Mool Chand is said to have blessed Ala, which had emboldened him further in his political pursuits, as he already knew about the blessing he had received earlier from Bhai Charan Das.

Until 1761, Ala Singh was against the Afghan invader Ahmad Shah Abdali and assisted the Marathas by providing them grains, however Fatto attempted to relax tensions between them by sending a tribute to Abdali. Yet the tribute was not enough to placate Abdali, who wanted to meet with Ala Singh in-person instead. During the invasions of Ahmad Shah Abdali in the aftermath of the Third Battle of Panipat (1761), Fatto evacuated to safety to Munak in the south of the polity's territory. She organized all the women and children into carts to escape toward Bathinda, which was heavily fortified. Abdali was eager to punish the Patiala chief for aiding the Marathas and thus plundered Barnala, the base of operations of Ala Singh, who by then had also escaped to Munak. During this time, Fatto ordered Biram Dhillon, Bhola Singh, Kahna Mal, and Kashmiri to attempt diplomacy with the Afghans via their representative Shah Wali Khan, the wazir of Abdali. Riding a horse with her grandson, Fatto reached Munak. This paved the way for a personal meeting between Ala Singh and Abdali, which thawed relations between the Afghans and Patiala Sikhs. This meeting allowed the Patiala ruler to be recognized as an independent chief of the region by Abdali and Zain Khan Sirhindi and through a firman passed on 29 March 1761, it was recorded that 726 villages were in Ala Singh's control.

After the conquest of Sirhind by a Sikh coalition in 1764, Ala Singh wanted to occupy Sirhind, yet Mai Fatto advised him not to-do so as the city of Sirhind had a negative reputation in the eyes of other Sikhs due to the events that transpired there involving Guru Gobind Singh's sons and occupying it would lower Ala Singh's prestige.

After the death of Mai Fatto's husband Ala Singh, she installed Amar Singh, who was 18 years old at the time, on the throne of Patiala. Most were not opposed to Amar Singh taking the throne, however Himmat Singh, the half-brother of Amar Singh, protested and took military control of the fort of Bhawanigarh and the surrounding area, with Amar Singh responding by preparing for a military expedition. However, Fatto managed to peacefully settle the differences between Himmat Singh and Amar Singh, with Himmat Singh being permitted to keep his possessions. Fatto lived for nine years as a widow after the death of Ala Singh and died in 1773.

Ala Singh and Fatto had a daughter named Pardhan, who became a religious individual, founding a school (pathshala) at Barnala. Pardhan died in 1789. Bibi Sahib Kaur was Fatto's great-granddaughter.

== Legacy ==
Fatto's story is recounted in Harleen Singh's book The Lost Heer: Women in Colonial Punjab. In Punjab, it is common for girls to be called "Bhain Fatto" or "Mai Fatto" when they exhibit leadership and take the initiative.
