= Baddowal =

Coordinates: 30°52′N 75°45′E

- Village
- Interactive map of Baddowal
- Country: India
- State: Punjab
- District: Ludhiana
- Tehsil: ludhiana
- Region: malwa

Government
  - Type: Panchayat raj
  - Body: Gram panchayat

Languages
  - Official: Punjabi
- Time zone: UTC+5:30 (IST)
- Postal code: 141021
- Telephone: 0161
- ISO 3166 code: IN-PB
- Vehicle registration: PB-10
- Website: gurdaspur.nic.in

Baddowal is a village in Punjab in ludhiana district of Punjab State, India. The village is most of belong to jatt GREWAL caste administrated by Sarpanch an elected representative of the village.

== See also ==
- List of villages in India
