= Treaty of Amritsar (1809) =

1809 treaty between the East India Company and Ranjit Singh

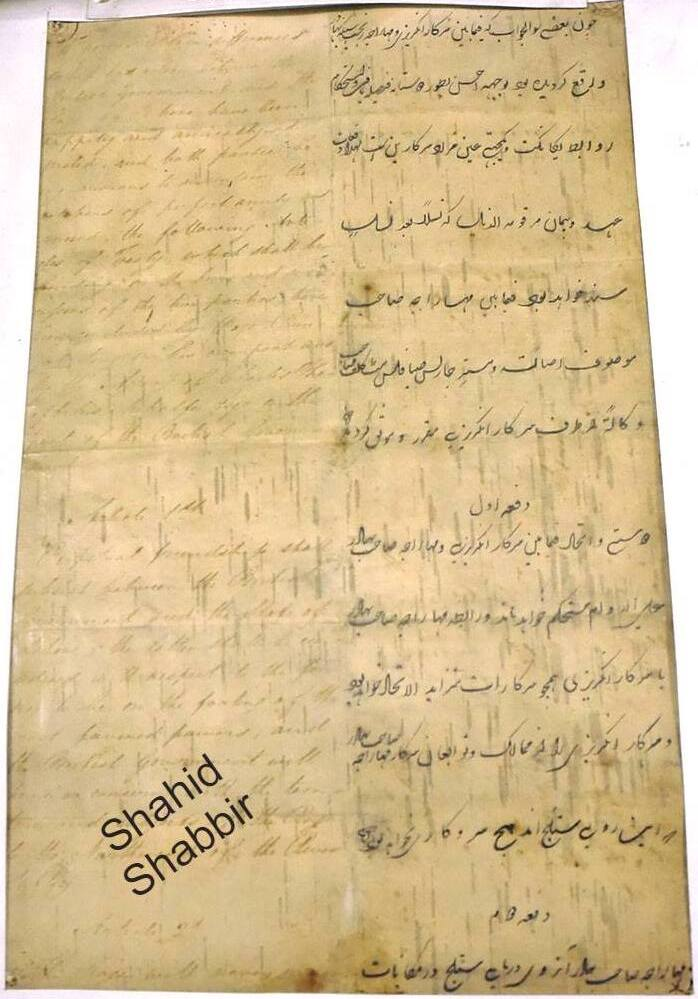
- Original document of the Treaty of Amritsar (1809) between the Sikh Empire and British East India Company
- Parties: Sikh Empire; British East India Company

The Treaty of Amritsar of 1809 was an agreement between the British East India Company and Maharaja Ranjit Singh, the Sikh leader who founded the Sikh Empire. The EIC's intention of this treaty was to gain Singh’s support if the French invaded India and Singh’s intention was to further consolidate his territorial gains south of the Sutlej River after establishing the river as their respective border. Singh wanted to officially absorb the Malwa Sikhs in his kingdom, which resided between the Sutlej and Yamuna Rivers, thus unifying all Sikhs of Punjab within his kingdom.

The signing of the treaty between the British East India Company and the Sikh Empire occurred on 25 April 1809, with the transaction being finalized by a proclamation on 3 May 1809.

== Background ==
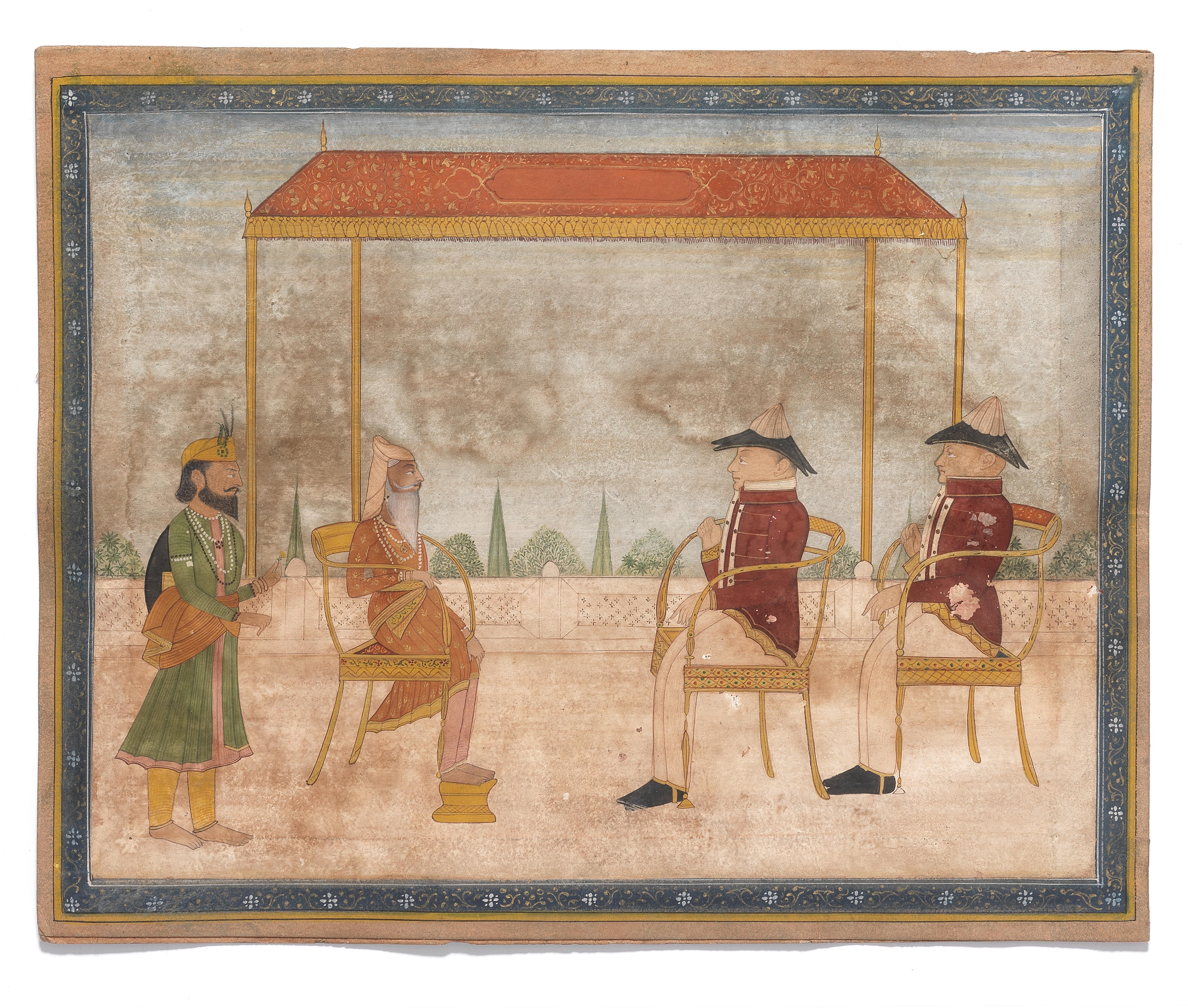
Maharaja Ranjit Singh with two British officers, circa 19th century, gouache and gold on paper

Ranjit Singh (1780-1839) was a Sikh warrior who had been establishing a kingdom in then northern India. He had established a capital at Lahore in 1799, proclaimed himself maharajah of the Punjab in 1801 and expanded his territories to such an extent that by 1808 he had control of an area bounded by the Jhelum and Sutlej Rivers. The Sikh chiefs of the Malwa region appealed to the British for protection from Singh fearing he would soon absorb them into his kingdom. The EIC declined because of the pending rumored invasion from Napoleon and Russia after they had signed the Treaty of Tilsit in 1807. They needed Singh as an ally because his kingdom was between Russia and India, serving as an ideal buffer state from an attack.

Singh accepted the EIC’s invitation to meet EIC diplomat Charles Metcalfe to discuss the possible French Russian invasion. After months of negotiations, Singh invaded Malwa to prove to Metcalfe his hold over the region and establish the Yamuna River as his border. The EIC responded by sending their troops to the Sutlej River to declare this as their border and force Singh to agree to the treaty. However, Singh challenged them, sending his troops across the river facing the EIC troops.

At this time, Napoleon's forces attacked Spain and seemed very unlikely to attack India. Thus, the EIC changed their policy of aggression because they no longer needed Singh for an alliance. They submitted a new treaty allowing Singh to retain some his conquests south of the Sutlej in Malwa, but the Sutlej would remain their border. Unaware of the changed EIC outlook, Singh concluded it was best not to risk war realizing his relative military weakness and agreed to sign the updated treaty.

Although the terms of the treaty prevented Singh from any further territorial expansion south of the Sutlej, it permitted him complete freedom of action to the north of it. This enabled him to extend his rule over rival Sikh Misls and ultimately expand to areas such as Peshawar, Multan and Kashmir by defeating the Afghan Durrani Empire. The unification of these territories aided by his French generals Westernising his armies, formed the Sikh empire that lasted until British subjugation in 1849.

The factors that led to the Sikh Empire signing the treaty were as follows:

- After Ranjit Singh's third cis-Sutlej expedition, a detachment of the British forces advanced under the leadership of David Ochterlony, with the general stating on 9 February 1809 that further incursions by the Sikh Empire south of the Sutlej would be met with British aggression going forward.
- The Sikh Empire worried that further aggressions would intimidate the cis-Sutlej chiefs to move further toward developing a firmer alliance with the British.
- Metcalfe assured Ranjit Singh's court that the British would not interfere with Sikh conquests in the opposite direction toward Afghanistan.
- Ranjit Singh had assumed that there would be less anxiety over the western frontier due to improved relations between the British and Ottomans after the ascension of Mahmud II, allowing for a cessation of hostilities.

== Principal Articles ==
The principal articles of the 1809 treaty were as follows:

1. The country of the chiefs of Malwa and Sirhind having entered under the British protection, they shall in future be secured from the authority and influence of Maharaja Ranjit Singh, conformably to the terms of the treaty.
2. All the country of the chiefs thus taken under protection shall be exempted from all pecuniary tribute to the British Government.
3. The chiefs shall remain in the full exercise of the same rights and authority in their own possessions which they enjoyed before they were received under the British protection.
4. Should a British army on purposes of general welfare, be required to march through the country of the said chiefs, it is necessary and incumbent that every chief shall, within his own possessions, assist and furnish, to the full of his power, such force with supplies of grain and other necessaries which may be demanded.
5. Should an enemy approach from any quarter, for the purpose of conquering this country, friendship and mutual interest require that the chiefs join the British army with all their force, and, exerting themselves in expelling the enemy, act under discipline and proper obedience.

== Original text of treaty of Amritsar (1809) ==
Since some disagreements had come up between the British Government and the Raja of Lahore, but were peacefully settled, and both sides wanted to keep friendly and peaceful relations, the following treaty was made. It will be binding on both their heirs and successors. The treaty was agreed to by Raja Ranjit Singh for his side, and by Charles Theophilus Metcalfe on behalf of the British Government.

Article 1

Perpetual friendship shall subsist between the British Government and the State of Lahore. The latter shall be considered, with respect to the former, to be on the footing of the most favoured powers; and the British Government will have no concern with the territories and subjects of the Rajah to the northward of the River Sutlej.

Article 2

The Rajah will never maintain in the territory occupied by him and his dependants, on the left bank of the River Sutlej, more troops than are necessary for the internal duties of that territory, nor commit or suffer any encroachments on the possessions or rights of the Chiefs in its vicinity.

Article 3

In the event of a violation of any of the preceding Articles, or of a departure from the rules of friendship on the part of either State, this Treaty shall be considered to be null and void.

Article 4

This Treaty consisting of four Articles, having been settled and concluded at Amritsar, on the 26th day of April 1809, Mr. Charles Theophilus Metcalfe has delivered to the Rajah of Lahore a copy of the same, in English and Persian under his seal and signature and the said Rajah has delivered another copy of the same, under his seal and signature; and Mr. Charles Theophilus Metcalfe engages to procure, within the space of two months, a copy of the same duly ratified by the Right Honourable the Governor-General in Council, on the receipt of which by the Rajah, the present Treaty shall be deemed complete and binding on both parties, and the copy of it now delivered to the Rajah shall be returned.

C.T.Metcalfe	Rajah Runjeet Sing

MINTO.
Ratified by the Governor-General in Council on the 30th May 1809.

On 12th June, the ratified treaty was sent to Raja Ranjit Singh by Lieutenant-Colonel Ochterlony. On the same day, Ochterlony also issued a public announcement to the Cis-Sutlej chiefs, saying that they were now under British protection.

== Aftermath ==
As per the 1809 treaty, Ranjit Singh was permitted to retain his cis-Sutlej territories that had been acquired prior to his third cis-Sutlej expedition but Ranjit Singh had vacated his control over Faridkot and Ambala. Furthermore, he was not permitted to form an alliance with any of the cis-Sutlej chiefs. The treaty pushed the boundary of British India from the Yamuna to the Sutlej river. The treaty was successful at halting the southern expansion of the Sikh Empire south of the Sutlej river, with Ranjit Singh instead turning his immediate focus to the Gurkha occupation in the Punjab Hills and internal conflict in Afghanistan shortly thereafter.

== Gallery ==
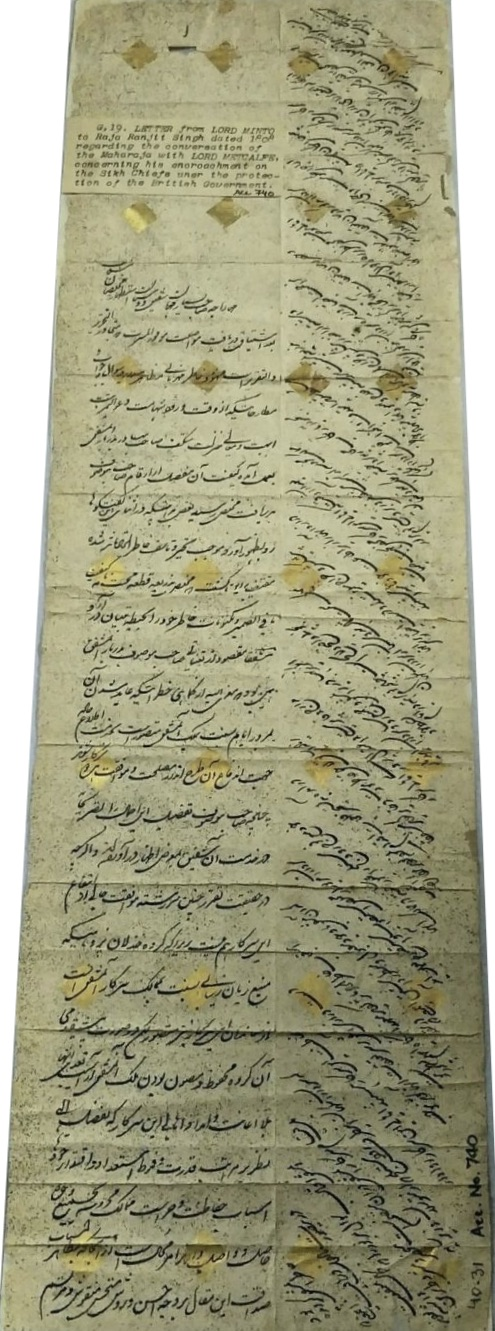
A letter from Lord Minto to emperor Ranjit Singh dated 1808, regarding the latter’s encroachment on the Sikh Chiefs under the protection of the British Government. It may have been the preamble to the Treaty of Amritsar (1809)

== See also ==
- List of treaties
- Treaty of Lahore
