= Phulkian States =

Group of Princely States

Phulkian States was the collective name given to the three small kingdoms and later princely states of Patiala, Jind, and Nabha in Punjab during the British Raj in India. The polities were connected to the Phulkian dynasty.

== History ==
Bhati was a direct descendant of Krishna and belonged to the lunar dynasty. He defeated 14 princes and annexed their territories. His descendants later came to be known as the Bhatis. One of them, Jaisal, founded Jaisalmer. Jaisal had four sons: Shalivahan, Kailan, Hemhel, and Pem. Hemhel, his third son, sacked the town of Hisar. He captured a number of villages in its vicinity and overran the surrounding countryside up to the walls of Delhi. Shams ud-Din Iltutmish drove Hemhel back but later received him into his favour and appointed him Governor of Sirsa and Bathinda in 1212 A.D. He founded the town of Hanesar and died there in 1214. He was succeeded by his son Jandra. Jandra had 21 sons. Each of his sons became the progenitor of a distinct clan. His son, Batera, is the ancestor of the Sidhu clan. Batera was succeeded by his son Manjalrab, who was beheaded at Jaisalmer. Manjalrab was followed by his son Undra (Anand Rai), and Undra was succeeded by his son Khewa.

Khewa first married a woman from a Rajput family but had no children with her. He then married the daughter of a Jat zamindar. From this second marriage, he had a son named Sidhu. However, the Rajputs did not accept this union. According to their customs, Sidhu could not inherit his father's caste and was therefore identified by his mother's caste. The Sidhu clan has derived its name from him. Sidhu had four sons: Dhar (also known as Debi), Bar, Sur, and Rupach. The rulers of the Phulkian States are descended from his second son, Bar. Bar had a son, Bir, who had two sons, Sidtilkara and Sitrah. Sitrah had two sons, Jertha and Lakumba. Jertha had a son, Mahi, who was followed in successive generations by Gala, Mehra, Hambir, and Barar. Barar had two sons, Paur and Dhul. Dhul was the progenitor of the Rajas of Faridkot. The two brothers quarrelled, and Paur fell into poverty. Several generations of his family remained in this state until Sangrur restored their fortunes. Sangrur assisted Babur in his invasion of India and was killed during the first battle of Panipat. After Babur's victory over Ibrahim Lodhi, and in recognition of Sangrur's services, Babur appointed his deceased son Wariyam (also known as Bairam or Beeram) as Chowdhury of the territory to the south-west of Delhi. Wariyam was later confirmed in this office by Humayun. He was killed in 1560 during a conflict with the Bhattis. His grandson Satu also fell alongside him. Wariyam left two sons: Mehraj, who succeeded him, and Garaj. Mehraj was succeeded by his grandson Pakhu. Pakhu was killed in a battle against the Bhattis at Baddowal. Pakhu had two sons, Habbal and Mohan. Mohan succeeded him.

Mohan was unable to pay the arrears owed to the government and was continually harassed by the Bhattis. He fled to Hansi and Hisar, where he assembled a force. He then returned home and defeated the Bhattis at Baddowal. Following the advice of Guru Hargobind, he founded a village, which he named Mehraj after his great-grandfather. Mohan and his eldest son, Rup Chand, were killed in a fight with the Bhattis.

Mohan son, Kul Chand, succeeded him and became the guardian of Rup’s sons, Sandhali and Phul. Soon after Guru Hargobind visited Baddowal, Kul instructed his nephews that when they saw the Guru Hargobind, they should place their hands on their stomachs as if they were hungry. Upon seeing the Guru Hargobind, they followed his instructions. Guru Hargobind inquired about the reason for their gesture. Kul explained that the boys were starving. Upon hearing this, the Guru responded, "What matters the hunger of one belly, when these boys shall satisfy the hunger of thousands?" He then asked for the names of the children. When he heard the name Phul, he remarked, "The name shall be a true omen, and he shall bear many blossoms."

Flag of Patiala

Flag of Nabha

Phul was later confirmed in the office that his family had held for many years by Shah Jahan. Phul had seven children: six sons (Tiloka, Rama, Raghu, Channu, Jhandhu and Takht Mal) and a daughter, Rami Ram Kaur.

Hamir Singh, a descendant of Tiloka, is the progenitor of the royal house of Nabha. Hamir Singh was the son of Suratiya, who was the son of Gurditta, who in turn was the son of Tiloka. Upon the death of Bhagwan Singh, the direct line of Gurditta, who was ruling at Nabha, came to an end. Hira Singh, a son of Sukha Singh and a grandson of Basawa Singh, himself a lineal descendant of Gajpat Singh of Jind, who was a cousin of Hamir, was placed on the throne of Nabha.

Gajpat Singh, the son of Sakhchain and grandson of Tiloka, was the progenitor of the royal house of Jind. Gajpat's daughter, Raj Kaur, married Maha Singh and was the mother of Ranjit Singh. When Sangat Singh of Jind died without an heir, Swarup Singh succeeded him as the ruler of Jind. He belonged to the Bazidpur branch of the Jind family. His father, Karam Singh, was the son of Bhup Singh and the grandson of Gajpat Singh.

Ala Singh, son of Rama is the progenitor of the royal house of Patiala.

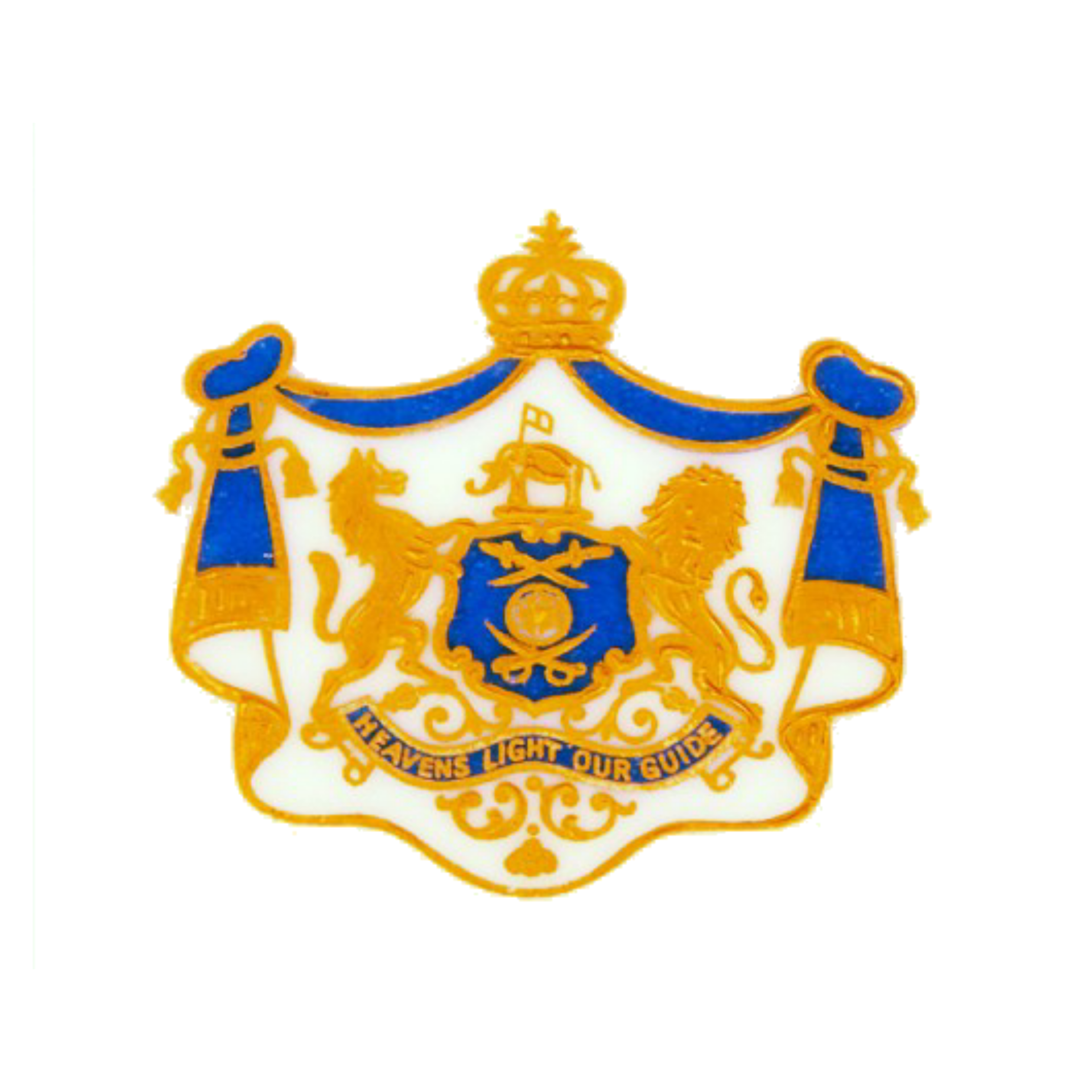
Coat of Arms of Patiala

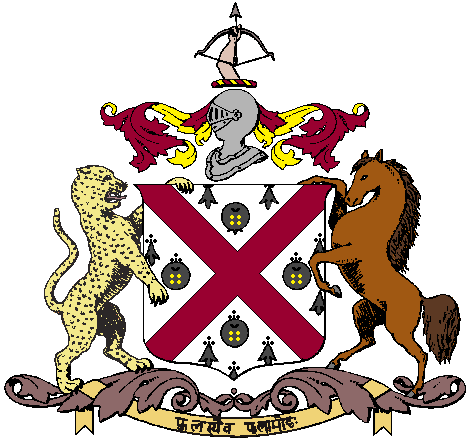
Coat of Arms of Nabha

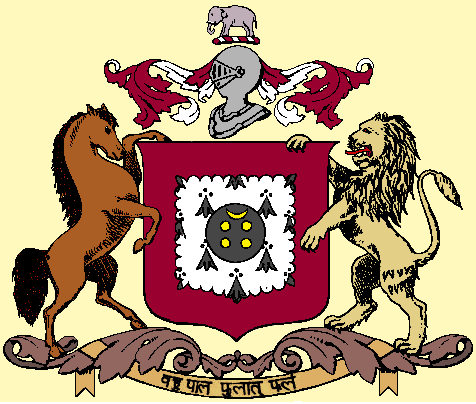
Coat of Arms of Jind

=== Accession ===
Following India's independence, the rulers of the Phulkian States acceded to the Dominion of India.

=== PEPSU ===
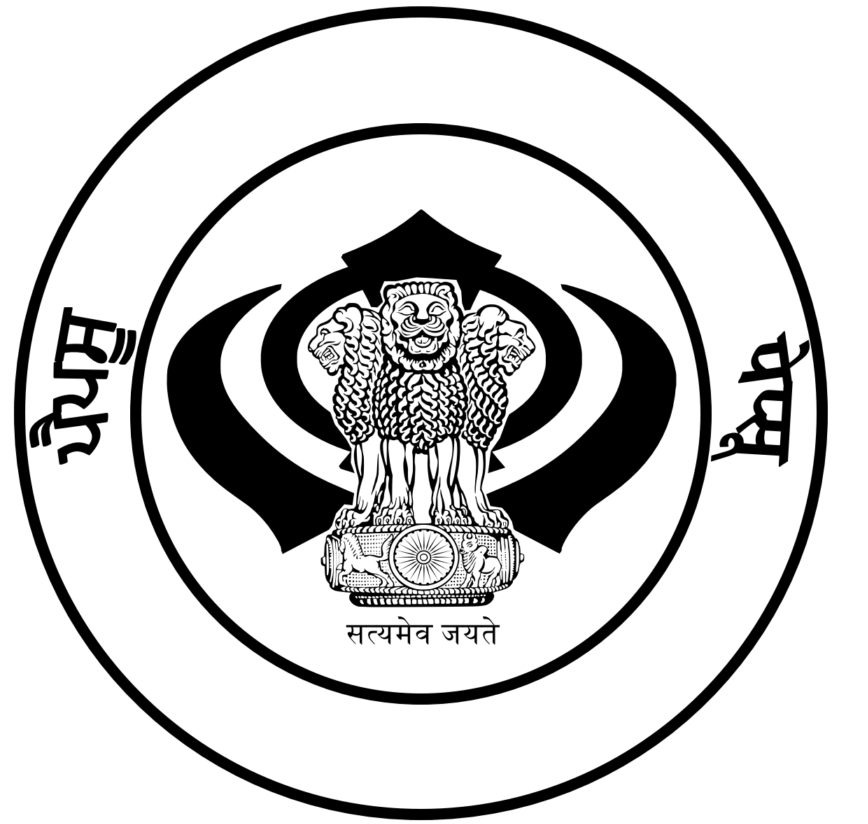
Emblem of PEPSU

The rulers of Patiala, Jind, and Nabha united in 1948 to form the Patiala and East Punjab States Union. PEPSU was inaugurated on 15 July 1948 by Sardar Vallabhbhai Patel. Yadavindra Singh, the Maharaja of Patiala, was appointed the Rajpramukh of it on the occasion. The capital and principal city of PEPSU was Patiala. On 1 November 1956, PEPSU was merged into Punjab. A portion of PEPSU presently lies within the state of Haryana.

== Area ==
Patiala was the largest of the three Phulkian princely states and covered an area of 5,942 sq mi (15,390 sq km). Jind had an area of 1,299 sq mi (3,364 sq km). Nabha had an area of 947 sq mi (2,453 sq km). Collectively, these states covered a total area of 8,188 sq mi (21,207 sq km).

== Population ==
In 1931, the population of Patiala was 1,625,520. The population of Jind was 324,676, while that of Nabha was 287,574. Collectively, these three states had a population of 2,237,770.

== Salutes ==
The ruler of Patiala was entitled to a salute of 17 guns and a permanent local salute of 19 guns. The ruler of Jind was entitled to a salute of 13 guns and a permanent local salute of 15 guns. The ruler of Nabha was entitled to a salute of 13 guns.

== Succession ==
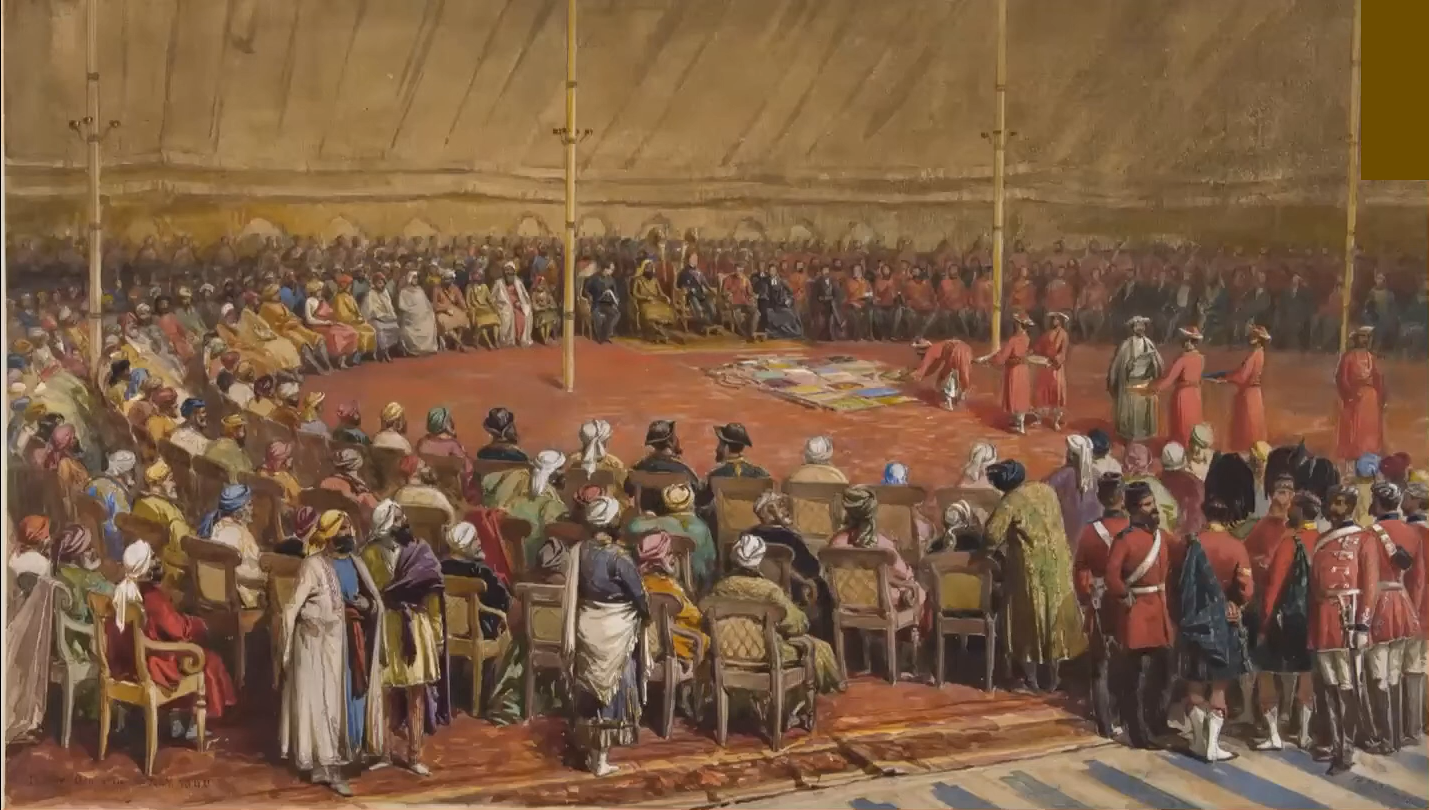
Painting of the Ambala Darbar held during 18–20 January 1860 of the Punjab chiefs of Patiala, Jind, and Nabha states and the British, held at Shaikabad, Ambala district, by William Simpson, 1860. At this darbar, it was decided that the doctrine-of-lapse would cease for the three states.

All three of the Phulkian States adhered to male primogeniture. This is a form of succession in which the eldest male child inherits the throne. Upon the death of the ruler of any of the Phulkian States, their heir immediately and automatically succeeded them to the throne of their respective state. The French phrase "Le roi est mort, vive le roi!" (transl. The king is dead, long live the king!) aptly describes this system.

In 1858, the rulers of these states jointly submitted a request to Earl Canning, the then Viceroy of India. In their petition, they requested the right to adopt an heir in the event of failure of male issue as a reward for the service they rendered to the East India Company during the Indian Rebellion of 1857. Earl Canning, however, refused their request; two years later, in 1860, upon his visit to Punjab, he granted them the right of adoption. This decision was made at the Ambala Darbar that was held in Ambala between 18–20 January 1860.

Another request they made in 1858 was that if any ruler of these states died leaving behind an infant heir, a council of regency should be appointed. This council was to comprise three elderly and trusted ministers of the state, none of whom were related to the heir. The British Government, acting on the advice of the rulers of the other two states, was to select the council. This request was granted.

== Rulers ==
=== List of rulers of the Patiala ===
| Name (Birth–Death) | Portrait | Term of office | | Note(s) | Reference |
| Name (Birth–Death) | Portrait | Start date | End date | Note(s) | Reference |
|---|---|---|---|---|---|
| Ala Singh (1695 – 1765) | | 1709 | 1765 | | |
| Amar Singh (1748 – 1781) | | 1765 | 1781 | | |
| Sahib Singh (1773 – 1813) | | 1781 | 1813 | | |
| Karam Singh (1824 – 1862) | | 1813 | 1845 | | |
| Narinder Singh (1824 – 1862) | | 1845 | 1862 | | |
| Mahendra Singh (1852 – 1876) | | 1862 | 1876 | | |
| Rajinder Singh (1872 – 1900) | | 1876 | 1900 | | |
| Bhupinder Singh (1891 – 1938) | | 1900 | 1938 | | |
| Yadavindra Singh (1913 – 1974) | | 1913 | 1974 | | |
Pretender
| Amarinder Singh (1942 – ) | | 1974 | | | |

=== List of rulers of the Jind ===
| Name (Birth–Death) | Portrait | Term of office | | Note(s) | Reference |
| Name (Birth–Death) | Portrait | Start date | End date | Note(s) | Reference |
|---|---|---|---|---|---|
| Gajpat Singh (1738 – 1789) | | 1758 | 1789 | | |
| Bhag Singh (1760 – 1819) | | 1789 | 1819 | | |
| Fateh Singh (1789 – 1822) | | 1819 | 1822 | | |
| Sangat Singh (1810 – 1834) | | 1822 | 1834 | | |
| Swarup Singh (1812 – 1864) | | 1834 | 1864 | | |
| Raghubir Singh (1832 – 1887) | | 1864 | 1887 | | |
| Ranbir Singh (1879 – 1948) | | 1887 | 1948 | | |
| Titular | | | | | |
| Rajbir Singh (1948 – 1959) | | 1948 | 1959 | | |
| Satbir Singh (1940 – 2023) | | 1959 | 2023 | Upon the death of his father, Rajbir Singh, in 1959, Yadavindra Singh, the Maharaja of Patiala, installed him as the Maharaja of Jind. | |

=== List of rulers of the Nabha ===
| Name (Birth–Death) | Portrait | Term of office | | Note(s) | Reference |
| Name (Birth–Death) | Portrait | Start date | End date | Note(s) | Reference |
|---|---|---|---|---|---|
| Hamir Singh (died 1783) | | 1765 | 1783 | | |
| Jaswant Singh (1775 – 22 May 1840) | | 1783 | 22 May 1840 | | |
| Devinder Singh (5 September 1822 – November 1865) | | 1840 | 1846 | Deposed | |
| Bharpur Singh (4 October 1840 – 9 November 1863) | | 1846 | 9 November 1863 | | |
| Bhagwan Singh (30 November 1842 – 31 May 1871) | | 17 February 1864 | 31 May 1871 | | |
| Hira Singh (19 December 1843 – 24 December 1911) | | 10 August 1871 | 25 December 1911 | | |
| Ripudaman Singh (4 March 1883 – 13 December 1942) | | 25 December 1911 | 7 July 1923 | | |
| Pratap Singh (21 September 1919 – 22 July 1995) | | 7 July 1923 | 24 July 1995 | | |
| Hanuwant Singh (5 December 1948 – 30 June 2017) | | 24 July 1995 | 30 June 2017 | | |
| Yudhister Singh (5 December 1972 – present) | | 30 June 2017 | | | |

== See also ==
- Phulkian dynasty
