= Swarup Singh of Jind =

Raja of Jind from 1834 to 1864

- Raja; Kunwar; Sardar; His Highness; KSI
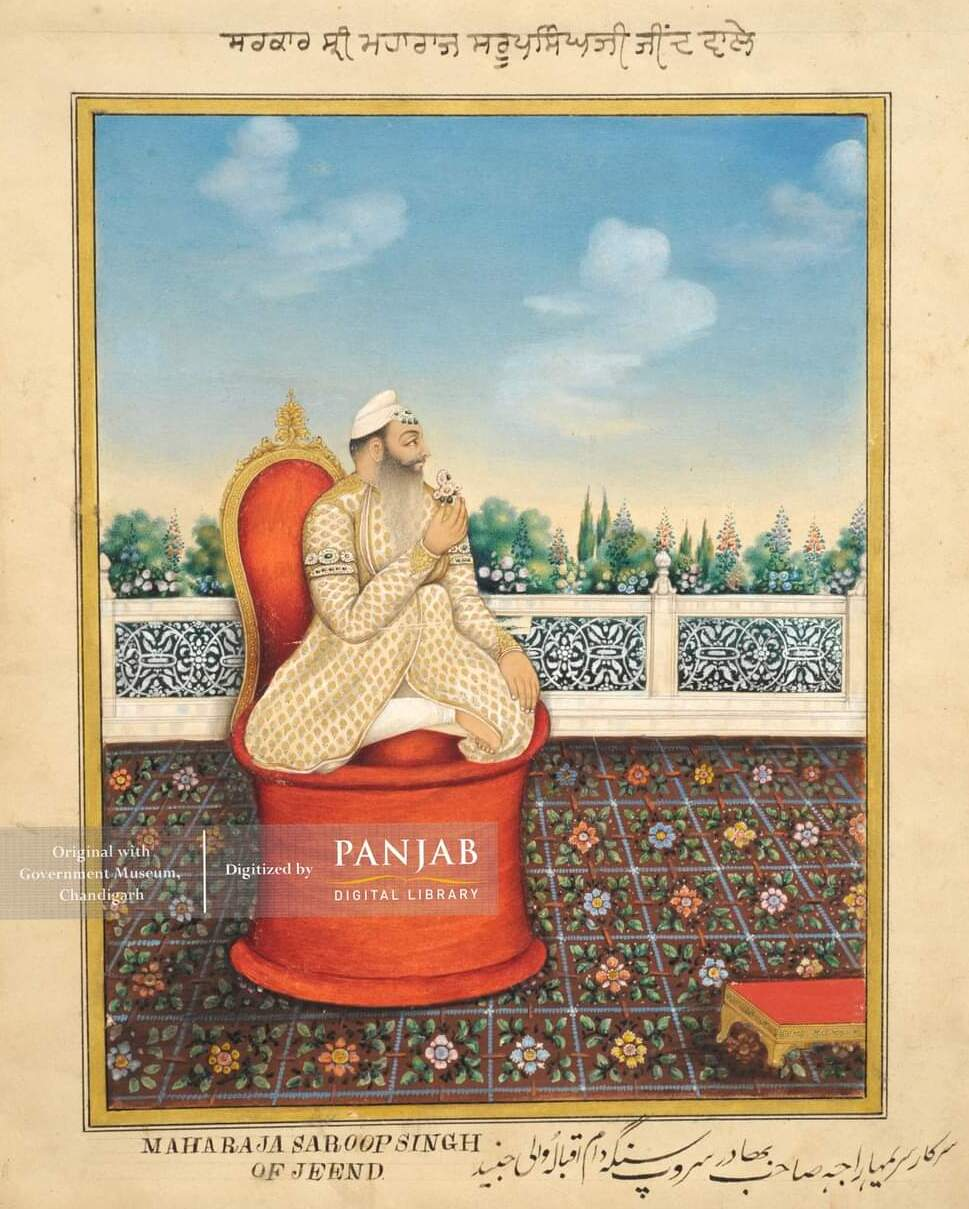
- Miniature painting of Raja Swarup Singh of Jind

Raja of Jind
- Reign: 4/5 November 1834 – 26 January 1864
- Coronation: April 1837
- Predecessor: Sangat Singh
- Successor: Raghubir Singh
- Born: 30 May 1812; Wazidpur, Patiala, Jind State
- Died: 26 January 1864 (aged 51); Wazidpur, Patiala, Jind State
- Spouse: Unknown princess; Nand Kaur Sahiba
- Issue: Randhir Singh; Raghubir Singh
- Dynasty: Phulkian
- Father: Karam Singh

Raja Swarup Singh KSI (30 May 1812 – 26 January 1864), also known as Sarup Singh, was a Sidhu Jat Raja of Jind State of the Phulkian dynasty who reigned from 1834 to 1864. He was noted for his administration and leadership during a crucial time in the history of Punjab.

== Early life and family ==
Swarup Singh was born at Wazidpur (today in Patiala District), the only son of Sardar Karam Singh (d. 1818), who was himself a nephew to Raja Bagh Singh of Jind (1760-1819; r. 1789–1819) through his father, Rajkumar Bhup Singh (1771–1815). In his earlier years, Karam Singh had served under Maharaja Ranjit Singh. In 1815, Karam Singh was granted the fief of Bazidpur after Bhup Singh's death. Through his father, Swarup Singh was a first cousin once removed to Hira Singh of Nabha. Karam Singh died in 1818, and Swarup Singh succeeded his father as Sardar of Bazidpur. He was the great-grandson of Raja Gajpat Singh and hence a nephew of Maharaja Ranjit Singh.

Swarup Singh married twice, first to an unknown princess (d. 1877) and secondly to Rani Sri Nand Kaur Sahiba. He had two sons:

1. Tikka Sri Randhir Singh Sahib Bahadur (d. 1848). No issue.
2. Sri Tikka Sahib Raghubir Singh, who succeeded his father as Raja of Jind.

== Early career ==
=== Reign ===
In 1834, Swarup Singh's second cousin, Raja Sangat Singh (1810–1834; r. 1822–1834) died of alcoholism after a profligate and repressive 12-year rule that had brought Jind to the brink of financial collapse; he left no sons. The British were set upon annexing the Jind State. To prevent the state falling into British hands, a joint council of Patiala, Nabha, Kaithal and Jind states all decided to nominate Swarup Singh as Raja at Dodhan (nowadays Bhawanigarh) and Swarup Singh became officially Raja of Jind in 1837.

=== Anglo-Sikh Wars ===
His conduct during First Anglo-Sikh War was somewhat complex as Jind was fined 10,000 rupees by the British for not coordinating as expected, as he tried to slow the British troops from moving through his state. He did not participate in the Second Anglo-Sikh War.

== Late career ==
=== Revolt of 1857 ===
During the First War of Independence, he sent his troops into battle against the rebels, personally fighting through many of the major battles clad in armor and chain mail. He rushed his forces to defend the British cantonment at Karnal, then served at Alipur and at the Battle of Badli-ki-Serai. He fought alongside the British forces during the siege of Delhi for which he was mentioned in despatches in 1858 and received the Indian Mutiny Medal. Also in 1858, he received several titles of honour from the British government. In 1860, he was granted a further title, a gun salute of 11-guns, 14 villages and the Delhi properties of a Mughal prince, Shahzada Mirza Abu Baqar. The following year, Swarup Singh received a further 11 villages as a reward.

=== Social reforms ===
Not merely a warrior, but also a progressive and humane ruler, Swarup Singh issued several stern decrees outlawing infanticide, sati and slavery.

== Death ==
In 1863, Swarup Singh was appointed a Knight Companion of the Order of the Star of India. The following year, he unexpectedly died from acute dysentery after a 30-year reign, aged 51. He was succeeded by his only surviving son, Raghubir Singh. He died in 1864 and his Samadh is built in Wazidpur.

== Titles ==
- 1812-1818: Kunwar Sri Swarup Singh
- 1818-1834: Sardar Sri Swarup Singh
- 1834-1858: Raja Sri Swarup Singh, Raja of Jind
- 1858-1860: His Highness Farzand-i-Dilband, Rasikh-ul-Itiqad, Raja Sri Swarup Singh Bahadur, Raja of Jind
- 1860-1863: His Highness Farzand-i-Dilband, Rasikh-ul-Itiqad-i-Daulat-i-Inglishia, Raja Sri Swarup Singh Bahadur, Raja of Jind
- 1863-1864: His Highness Farzand-i-Dilband, Rasikh-ul-Itiqad-i-Daulat-i-Inglishia, Raja Sir Swarup Singh Bahadur, Raja of Jind, K.C.S.I.

== Honours ==
- Mentioned in Despatches -1858
- Indian Mutiny Medal -1858
- Knight Companion of the Order of the Star of India (K.C.S.I.) -1863
