= Patiala Branch =

Coordinates: 30°18′N 76°24′E

The Patiala Branch, also known as the Patiala Feeder, is a canal branch of the Sirhind Canal located in Punjab, India. It is one of the two main bifurcations of the Sirhind Canal, with the other being the Combined Branch. While the Combined Branch led west, the Patiala Branch went eastward toward the locality of Patiala. It had a capacity of 3,000 cubic feet per second. The Patiala Branch heading southward then branches off into the Kotla Branch, Ghaggar Branch, and the Choa Branch, which irrigated the native princely state territories, mostly Phulkian states, with the fixed allotment of the Patiala Feeder's waters being distributed 83% to Patiala State, 9% to Nabha State, and 8% to Jind State. The branches of the Patiala Feeder were constructed to be navigable, promoting the timber trade, with wood being sourced from the Pahari Hills travelling from Ropar to the North-Western Railway via the canal. In February 2008, a revamped Patiala Feeder canal was completed. A project to pave 24 km of the feeder was completed in February 2025. There is an underutilization of waters from the Patiala Feeder for irrigation purposes due to a lack of maintenance, repair, and supply, with only 45% of its waters being used for irrigation, leading to a decline of ground-water in the areas it serves as farmers rely on tube-wells.
