= Malaudh =

- town
- Location in Punjab, India
- Coordinates: 30°38′N 75°56′E
- Country: India
- State: Punjab

Languages
  - Official: Punjabi
- Time zone: UTC+5:30 (IST)

The town of Malaudh, or Maloud, is situated at a distance of about 40 kilometres from Ludhiana on the Ludhiana-Malerkotla Road and is linked by approach road kup-payal road though village Rorian which is now part of it as Nagar Panchayat. It lies on 75°- 56' Longitude and 30° – 38' Latitude. Malaudh is a very ancient place which was known as Malla Udey or rise of the Mallas with whom Multan or Mallustan is associated and later got corrupted to Malaudh. There was a The Loharan about 1 kilometer on the southern side which has now disappeared. Malaudh has a government high school (co-educational), middle school for girls and a primary school for boys, a post office, primary health centre and a veterinary dispensary. Malaudh became a part of the Ludhiana District when it was formed out of the territories annexed by the British in 1846.

Malaudh was a Cis-Sutlej Phulkian princely state of India till 1846, after which it was merged into the Ludhiana District by the British when they annexed the territories around Ludhiana.

== History ==
It was held by the Malaudh Phoolkian Sardars since the middle of eighteenth century. The Malaudh Chiefs held the greater part of the Ludhiana and jagraon tahsils and like others of the Phulkian stock, had also a system of Revenue collection taking a share of the produce from the husbandmen. The ruling families of Patiala, Nabha, Jind, Faridkot, Bhadaur and Malaudh all descend from the Chandra Vanshi clan and descendants of Lord Krishna, Avatar of Lord Vishnu. Phool, a Sidhu Brar was the founder of this family which used Phoolkian from Phool, as their eponym. Phool along with his brother Sandali became orphans in 1618 and both were taken under the wings of their Uncle Chaudhary Kala who founded Mehraj on the advice of the sixth Guru Hargobind . They both visited Guru Hargobind as youngsters, it is said that their uncle told them to rap their bellies to indicate to the Guru the poverty and hunger they were enduring. On being told his name was Phool which means flower, the Guru Hargobind said, " The name shall be a True Omen, and he shall bear many blossoms. " The Guru blessed Phool and is said to have told him that he would make a King. The Guru Har Rai had blessed him thus: You feel’eth hunger now, worry no more...your house shall be a very big Charity House ....donating and feeding many…….the horses of you Armies shall graze in grasslands spanning the area between the Yamuna and the Sutlej.

Phool's eldest son Tiloka was the ancestor of the Nabha, Jind and Badrukha royal families and his second son Rama sired six sons and out of Dunna, Ala Singh & Bakhta sprang the great princely states of Bhadaur, Patiala and Malaudh which were the most important of the Cis-Satluj States belonging to the Phoolkian Misl and the prophecy of the Guru was fulfilled.

Bakhta, the ancestor of the Malaudh royal family was Rama's fourth Son. It was in 1754 that Sardar Man Singh son of Bakhta Mal of the legendary Phoolka feudal family conquered the fort from the Malerkotla Afghans. Thereafter Malaudh remained under the Malaudh Sardars who held over 85 villages to the south of Ludhiana. Sardar Dalel Singh son of Man Singh was a religious minded ascetic, he employed as his officials Fakirs & Mahants and outlawed hunting on his estates. In 1806, Maharaja Ranjit Singh, passing through the country, summoned Sardar Dalel Singh. On his refusal to come, he was engaged in prayers and devotion, Ranjit Singh was incensed and seized his eldest son Fateh Singh making him carry a heavy load for a long distance releasing him only when the Sardar had paid him Rs. 22,000 as fine or harrzana.

The Phoolkian Chiefs of Patiala, Nabha, Jind, Bhadaur and Malaudh could not pull along well with Maharaja Ranjit Singh. Therefore, they sought help from the British who made Maharaja Ranjit Singh sign the Treaty of Amritsar in 1809. Thus the Phoolkian States retained their independent identity and came to be known as the Cis-Satluj States under the protection of the British Empire.

== Malaudh State ==
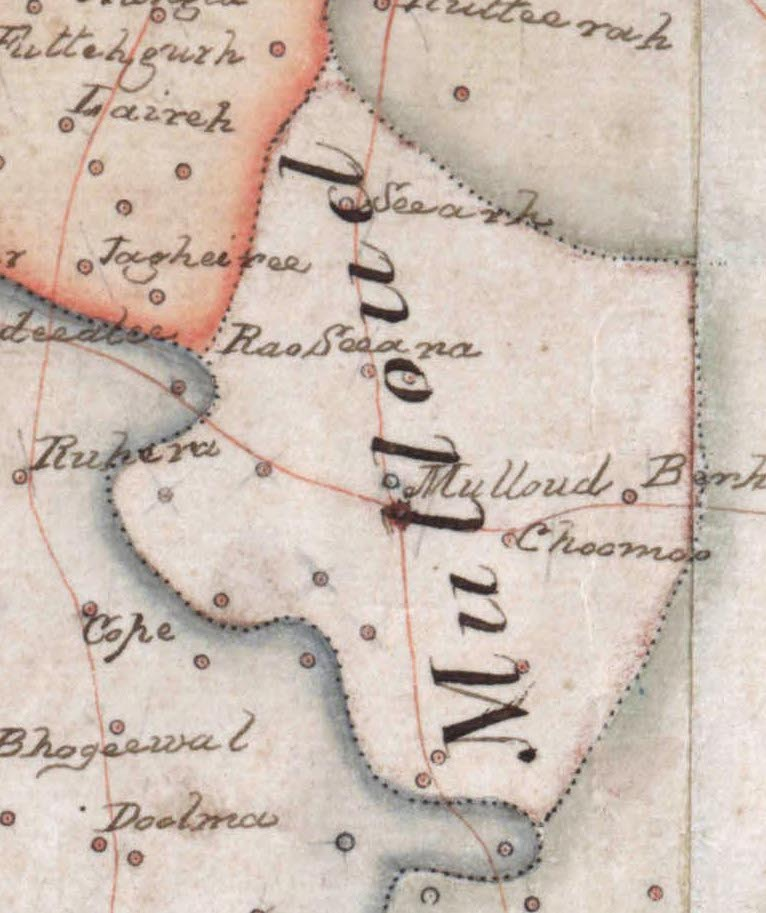
Detail of the main, continuous tract of territory of Malaudh State from a map created by the British East India Company, ca.1829–1835

Ala Singh and Bakhta, second and third sons of Rama left Bhadaur to their eldest brother Dunna and went to seek their fortunes elsewhere about the year 1720. Bakhta settled a few miles east of Bhadaur in the village of Dhapali, till he was called in by Shahna, a Jat who had attempted to found a village which still bears his name but was suppressed by the neighbouring villagers. Bhakhta built a rude fort which was called Kot Bakhta and made it his headquarters. Sardar Man Singh son of Bakhta conquered the Malaudh Ilaqa from the Maler Kotla Afghans in the year 1754. This was the period of activity of the Cis-Satluj States against the Muslims which culminated in the fall of Sirhind in 1863. The Malaudh Rajas maintained a position of Independence, the relationship to the Patiala Rajas giving them immunity from attacks by their neighbours. In 1860, the three main representatives of this Phoolka branch were invested with magisterial powers to be exercised within their local limits and their jagirs were maintained in its entirety. The Malod family had many forts in the area under their rule including forts in Ramgarh Sardaran, Pakhoke, Ber and a fine old fort of Shaina built by Bakhta. A large one in Malaudh was assigned to Raja Badan Singh C.S.I. recipient of Companionship Order of the Star of India in 1903 who exercised the same criminal and civil powers over the whole estate as his brother Sardar Sundar Singh Jagirdar did in his share. They took keen interest in the administration of the estate and welfare of their subjects. Raja Badan Singh was an invitee to the Delhi Coronation Durbar held in December 1911 to commemorate the coronation of King George V and Queen Mary as Emperor and Empress of India and received Delhi Durbar Medal 1911.

The Malaudh Rajas showed conspicuous loyalty to the British rendering good service in the First Anglo-Sikh War of 1845–46 in the battles of Mudki & Feruzshahar by placing their troops and all resources of the State at the disposal of the British Government and during the Indian Mutiny of 1857, were always ready with men and money and received considerable remission of taxation as reward. The Rajas of Malaudh paid a total Revenue of Rs. 52,000 and their Military Force consisted of Ten Guns,1500 Horsemen and 1500 Foot soldiers.

== Significance ==
Excavations carried out by the Archaeological Department, Punjab, at various places of Malerkotla Tahsil of Sangrur District, give sufficient proof that the area around Malaudh is quite rich in ancient history. From close scrutiny of the available data, the researchers have traced ancient history to the pre-Harppan period. The important sites so far excavated are around Malaudh Rorian and Rohira in Malerkotla. The town of Malaudh had a fortification wall which had been pulled down. In 1762, Malaudh Sardars opposed the advance of Ahmad Shah Abdali as part of the confederacy of Phoolkian Chiefs. Abdali after re-occupying Lahore received intelligence that great numbers of Sikhs had moved southwards, he immediately set out in pursuit. He covered a distance of 150 miles in two days and caught up with the Sikhs at the village of Kup. It was an unequal fight. Most of the 30,000 Sikhs were non-combatants, old men and women and children. Sikh horsemen could not indulge in their favourite hit and run tactics and had to engage Afghans, who outnumbered them, in hand-to-hand fight. Sikh soldiers put their women and children in the centre and moved down like a living fortress from Kup to Barnala where they expected Ala Singh of Patiala to come to their rescue. Afghans took a heavy toll of life, inflicted a crushing defeat and killed over 20000 Sikhs near Kup Rorian which is known as Wada Ghallughara or Major Holocaust. Later, during the uprising of 1857 which has now come to be known as First War of Independence, the situation in the Punjab was different from that which prevailed in the rest of India. As soon as news of the rising in Meerut and Delhi spread, "a season of open violent crime" set in the cis-Satluj states and in some towns of the Punjab. With a few exceptions, the Sikhs of both the Cis-Satluj and the trans-Satluj, princes and peasants expressed unreserved support to the British. The chiefs of Malaudh along with the Rajas of Jind, Patiala, Nabha, Kalsia and Kapurthala, the chiefs of Kheri, Bhadaur and Ladhran, the Singhpurias and the Sodhis of Kartarpur volunteered for service. Malaudh is also connected with the Namdhari attack on Malerkotla. In 1872 a batch of hundred and fifty Namdharis went to Payal in Patiala territory and re-appeared next day at Malaudh, the seat of Sirdar Badan Singh and attacked the Fort in a sudden onset with the idea, probably, of getting arms and money, they are said to have wanted the Chief to lead them. In this attack two men were killed on each side and a few wounded. The attack on the Fort took place on 15 January 1872 and was repulsed. The Namdharis succeeded only in securing three horses, one gun and one sword and attacked the palace and treasury of the Nawab of Malerkotla but were driven off when the Kotla guards had recovered from their surprise and were pursued to Rurr in Patiala territory (Patiala District). The Kuka warriors could not fight for long as they were already exhausted and were starving. A force of 16,000 men of all arms from Lord Napier's camp in Delhi was stopped on its march and ordered to return to camp. Meanwhile, sixty-eight of them, including two women belonging to Patiala were arrested and handed over to Patiala State and the rest of them were brought to Malerkotla. On getting the news of attack on Malaudh and Kotla, Mr. Cowan, the Deputy Commissioner of Ludhiana, started for the latter place and telegraphed for troops, which arrived soon after. On 17 January 1872, Mr. Cowan ordered the execution of forty-nine of the captured men by blowing them from guns at Kotla in an open field in the presence of thousands of spectators. Later, the British Government arrested and deported Guru Ram Singh. The Kukas displayed exemplary courage and faced the cannon willingly. Sixteen others were tried by the Commissioner Mr. Forsyth and hanged the following day at Malaudh. The British were horrified as was the rest of the western world and Lord Mayo ordered a halt to further executions and sacked Cowan.

== Demographics ==
As of 2001 India census, Maloud had a population of 7160. Males constitute 53% of the population and females 47%. Maloud has an average literacy rate of 69%, higher than the national average of 59.5%: male literacy is 74%, and female literacy is 63%. In Maloudh, 12% of the population is under six years of age. The population includes Somal, Deol, Cheema and Dhillon Jats.

== See also ==
- Jat Sikh
- Phulkian dynasty
- Patiala State
- Nabha State
- Jind State
- Faridkot State
- Bhadaur
- Kaithal State
- Cis-Sutlej states
