= Raghubir Singh of Jind =

Raghubir Singh
- Maharaja "Great king"
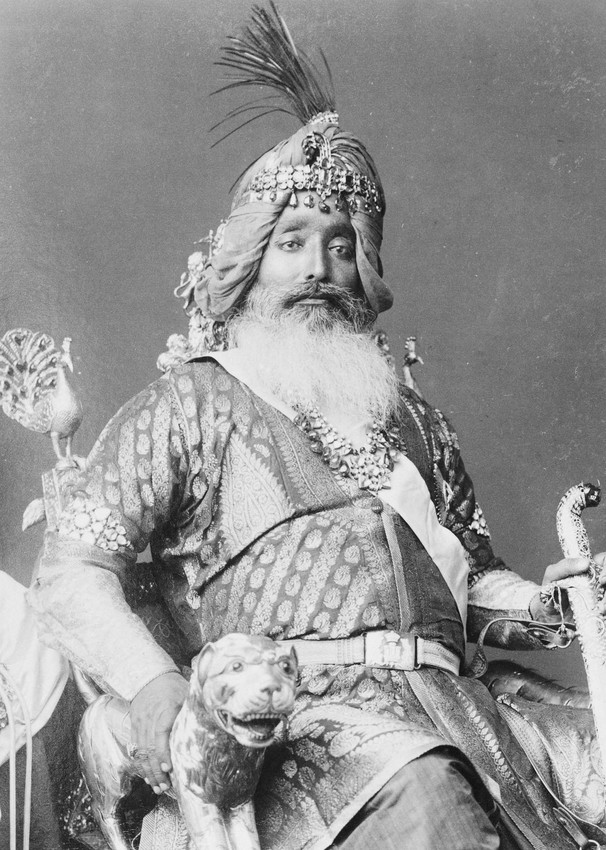
- Photograph of Maharaja Raghubir Singh of Jind State seated in an ornamental chair adorned with lions and peacocks, c. 1875
- Reign: 1864–1887
- Coronation: 31 March 1864
- Predecessor: Swarup Singh
- Successor: Ranbir Singh
- Born: 1832; Wazidpur (today Patiala district)
- Died: 7 March 1887 (aged 54–55)
- Spouse: Sama Kaur
- Issue: Balbir Singh (1857–1883); Ranbir Singh; Balbir Kaur
- House: Phulkian dynasty
- Father: Swarup Singh of Jind

Maharaja Raghubir Singh (1832 – 7 March 1887) was the Maharaja of Jind State of the Phulkian dynasty. He reigned from 1864 to 1887.

== Early life ==
Singh was born at Wazidpur in 1832, the younger of two sons of Swarup Singh of Jind. In 1848, he became heir apparent to his father upon the death of his older brother. During the Great Uprising, he fought alongside his father in armor and mail at some of the major battles against the rebels.

== Maharaja of Jind ==
Following his father's death in 1864, Raghubir Singh ascended the Jind gadi, having his coronation on 31 March of that year. The coronation was attended by the Lieutenant-Governor of the Punjab, Robert Montgomery, as well as by the Maharaja of Patiala-the head of the Phulkian clan. Raghubir Singh established his main residence at Sangrur, and began a long campaign to remodel his state. He rebuilt the Sangrur bazaar, constructed gardens and built temples, water tanks, public buildings and paved roads. In 1872, he contributed a contingent of the Jind artillery for service in the outbreak of Kuka movement.

In 1874, he faced a serious revolt in fifty villages in his territory of Charkhi Dadri, as well as in some other lands acquired after 1857, but he took personal command of his troops and subdued the revolt in a month and crushed it. Three principal villages which took part in the rebellion, Charkhi, Mankinas and Jhanjhu, were burned down.

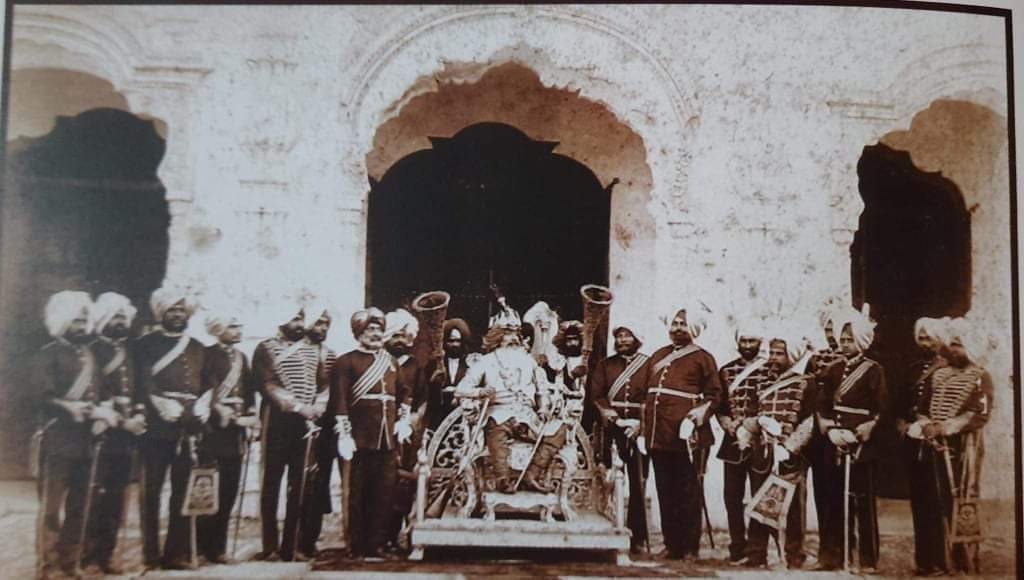
Photograph of Maharaja Raghubir Singh of Jind State and suite, ca.1870's–80's

In 1875, Raghubir Singh was knighted with the GCSI, the highest imperial dignity, receiving the KIH in 1877 and the CIE in 1878. During the Second Afghan War, he sent 700 cavalry and infantry to the aid of the British forces in Afghanistan. In 1877, Raghubir Singh was made a Councillor of the Empire (an ADC to the Viceroy). He was granted the title of Raja-i-Rajgan in 1881, and died six years later after a 23-year reign, aged 53. As his only son had died in 1883, he was succeeded by his grandson, Ranbir Singh.

== Marriages ==
Raghubir Singh married twice, first marrying Sama Kaur, the daughter of Jawahar Singh. The couple had a son and a daughter:

1. Balbir Singh (1857–1883). Married twice, first to a lady from Lahore (d. 1875) and secondly in 1872 to a daughter of the Sardar of Shahzadpur. He had a son and a daughter by his second wife:
  1. Ranbir Singh, who succeeded his grandfather as Raja and later Maharaja of Jind.
  2. Balbir Kaur, who married the Raja of Hathras (1886–1979) in 1902 and had one son.
2. A daughter, who married the Rai of Kalsia and had two sons.

== Titles ==
- 1834-1848: Maharajkumar Sri Raghubir Singh
- 1848-1864: Sri Tikka Sahib Raghubir Singh Bahadur
- 1864-1875: His Highness Farzand-i-Dilband, Rasikh-ul-Itiqad-i-Daulat-i-Inglishia, Maharaja Sri Raghubir Singh Bahadur, Maharaja of Jind
- 1875-1878: His Highness Farzand-i-Dilband, Rasikh-ul-Itiqad-i-Daulat-i-Inglishia, Maharaja Sri Sir Raghubir Singh Bahadur, Maharaja of Jind, GCSI
- 1878-1881: His Highness Farzand-i-Dilband, Rasikh-ul-Itiqad-i-Daulat-i-Inglishia, Maharaja Sri Sir Raghubir Singh Bahadur, Maharaja of Jind, GCSI, CIE
- 1881-1887: His Highness Farzand-i-Dilband, Rasikh-ul-Itiqad-i-Daulat-i-Inglishia, Raja-i-Rajgan, Maharaja Sri Sir Raghubir Singh Bahadur, Maharaja of Jind, GCSI, CIE

== Honours ==
- Knight Grand Commander of the Order of the Star of India (GCSI)-1875
- Prince of Wales gold medal-1876
- Empress of India Medal, gold-1877
- Companion of the Order of the Indian Empire (CIE)-1878
