= Ranbir Singh of Jind =

Last ruling Maharaja of Jind from 1887–1948

Ranbir Singh
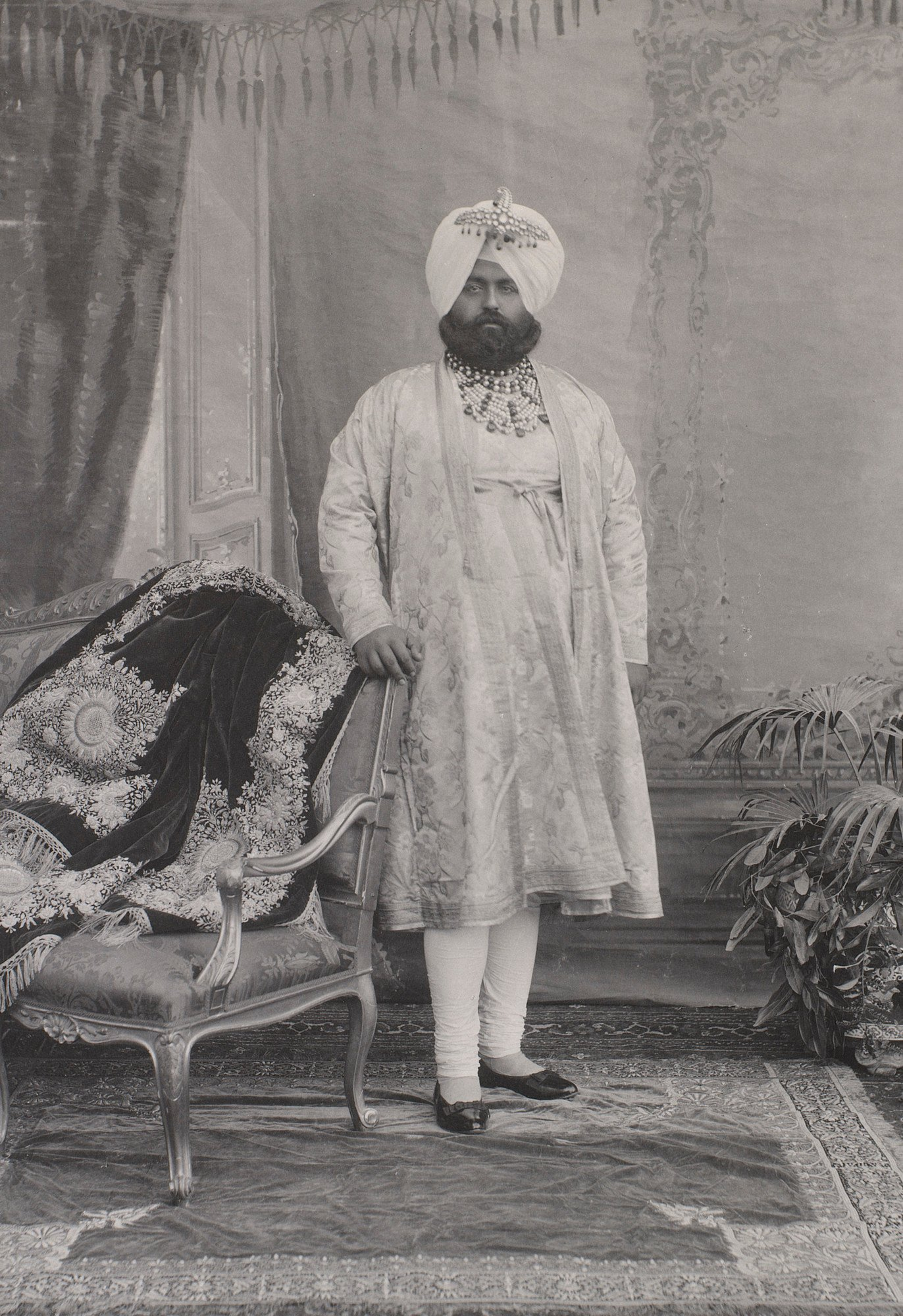
- Portrait by Bourne & Shepherd, 1903

Maharaja of Jind
- Reign: 7 March 1887 – 31 March 1948
- Predecessor: Raghubir Singh
- Successor: Rajbir Singh
- Chief Minister: Sir Shamsher Singh
- Born: 11 October 1879; Jind Fort Palace, Jind Fort, Jind, Kingdom of Jind, Empire of India
- Died: 31 March 1948 (aged 68); Mubarak Palace, Sangrur, Kingdom of Jind,
- Father: Balbir Singh, Crown Prince of Jind
- Religion: Sikhism

Brigadier Maharajah Sir Ranbir Singh G.C.S.I., G.C.I.E. (11 October 1879 – 31 March 1948) was the Maharaja of Jind (Punjab at that time, now Jind city falls in Haryana and the rest of his state is in Punjab). He ruled Jind from 1887 to 1948- one of the longest terms as the ruler.

== Early life and family ==
Singh was born on 11 October 1879 as the only son of Tikka Sri Balbir Singh Sahib Bahadur (1857-1883), the only son of Raghubir Singh of Jind and the heir apparent to the throne of Jind. When Ranbir Singh was four, his father died, and he became the heir. In 1887, his grandfather Raghubir Singh died, and he succeeded him as the Raja of Jind.

== Early career ==
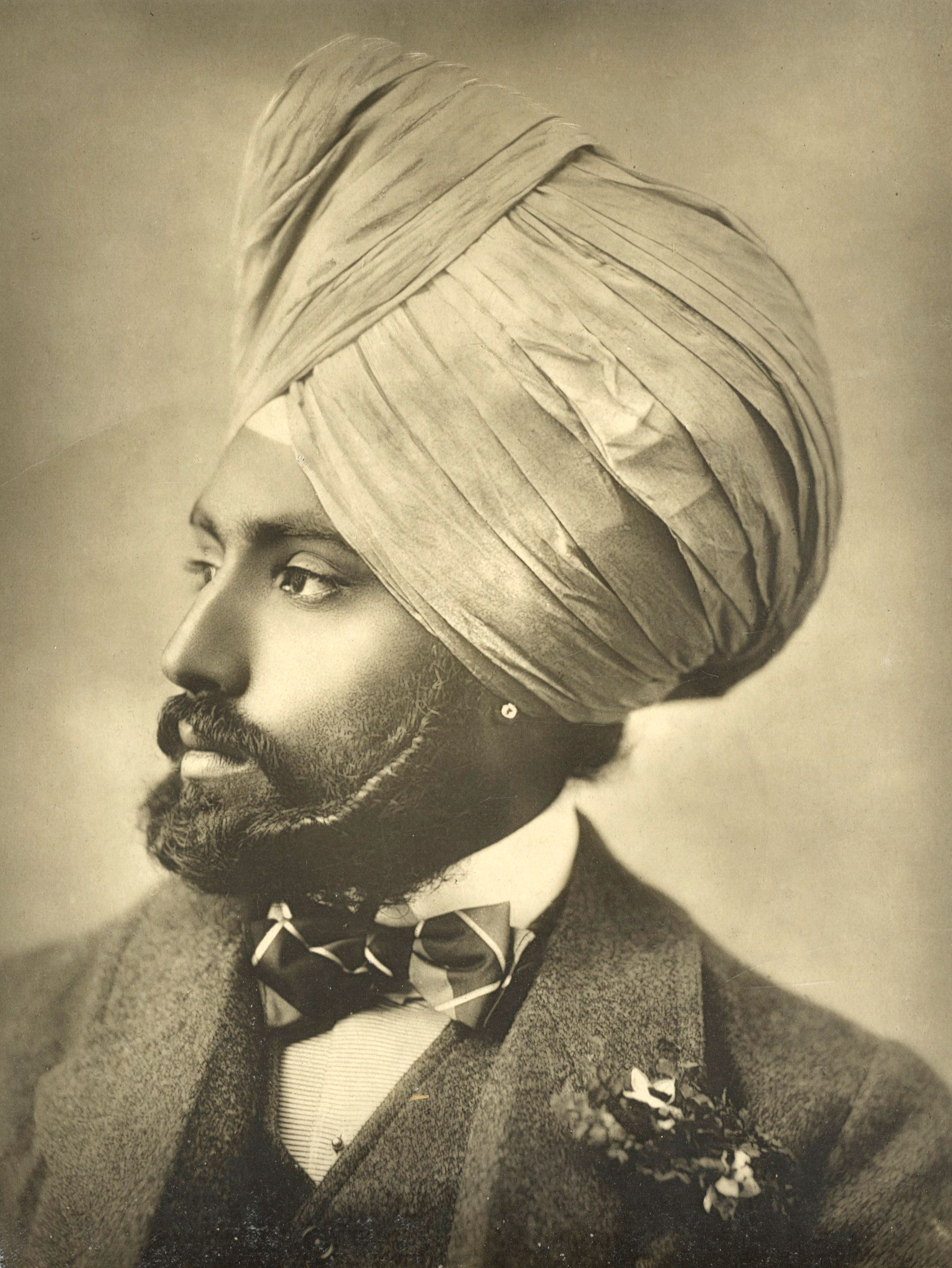
Ranbir Singh c. 1903

After ruling under a regency for a decade, Singh came of age and was formally installed in 1899. He contributed contingents of the state army to serve with the British in the Tirah Campaign of 1897, the East African campaign during the First World War and in the Third Afghan War of 1919 and the Malayan campaign against the forces of Imperial Japan during the Second World War. Ranbir Singh himself pursued a military career, eventually rising to the rank of Brigadier in the British Army.

A progressive ruler, Singh built schools and hospitals, established charities for widows and orphans and instituted free primary education in Jind. In the 1909 New Year Honours, he was knighted with the KCSI and two years later was granted the hereditary distinction of Maharaja of Jind. He was appointed a GCIE in the 1916 New Year Honours. In 1918, he received the additional title of Rajendra Bahadur; in 1926, he was granted an increased permanent gun salute of 13-guns with a 15-gun local salute. He was appointed a G.C.S.I. in 1937.

== Late career ==
He was stone deaf for his last few years on the throne, before the Partition of India and during the course of World War II, and was largely a puppet of the Prime Minister at the time- Sir Behari Lall Dhingra. He was known as the Bola Raja, or the 'Deaf King'. Later he joined the P.E.P.S.U. (Patiala and East Punjab States Union).

In March 1947, Singh celebrated his Diamond Jubilee, marking 60 years on the throne of Jind-the longest reign of any of the rulers of the Phulkian clan. He signed the Instrument of Accession to the Dominion of India five months later and died on 31 March 1948, aged 68 after a 61-year reign. He was succeeded by his son, Rajbir Singh.

== Personal life ==
He caused controversy when marrying a Belgian-Romanian woman named Olive Monalescu; Lord Curzon was the Viceroy of India at the time. He did not like this clandestine marriage. Ranbir Singh told Curzon frankly that the marriage was none of his concern. Curzon stated that Olive shall never get the title of ‘Maharani of Jind’ and it was so. Olive later took divorce from Ranbir Singh in 1928 and proceeded to London and settled there with her daughter Dorothy, who later committed suicide.

Maharaja Ranbir Singh was also a womanizer and philanderer. He was interested in dogs and he had many kennels in India, which many European aristocrats^{[who?]} used to visit.

Singh married five times, first to Dhelma Kaur, then to Jaswant Kaur (née Olive Monalescu), the daughter of a Romanian barber, third to Deepkumar Kaur and fourth to Gurcharan Kaur. He had 12 children, five sons and seven daughters:

1. An unnamed prince
2. Dorothy Kaur
3. Dhelma Kaur
4. Devinderbir Kaur
5. Rajbir Singh
6. Brijinder Kaur
7. Ruby Rajibir Kaur
8. Diamond Balbir Rajinder Kaur
9. Jagatbir Singh
10. Lieutenant-General Jasbir Singh, PVSM
11. Gajinder Bir Singh
12. Taranbir Kaur

== Titles ==
- 1879-1883: Rajkumar Sri Ranbir Singh
- 1883-1887: Sri Tikka Sahib Ranbir Singh Bahadur
- 1887-1909: His Highness Farzand-i-Dilband, Rasikh ul-Itiqad-i- Daulat-i-Inglishia, Raja-i-Rajgan, Raja Sri Ranbir Singh Bahadur, Raja of Jind
- 1909-1911: His Highness Farzand-i-Dilband, Rasikh ul-Itiqad-i- Daulat-i-Inglishia, Raja-i-Rajgan, Raja Sri Sir Ranbir Singh Bahadur, Raja of Jind, KCSI
- 1911-1916: His Highness Farzand-i-Dilband, Rasikh ul-Itiqad-i- Daulat-i-Inglishia, Raja-i-Rajgan, Maharaja Sri Sir Ranbir Singh Bahadur, Maharaja of Jind, KCSI
- 1916-1918: His Highness Farzand-i-Dilband, Rasikh ul-Itiqad-i- Daulat-i-Inglishia, Raja-i-Rajgan, Maharaja Sri Sir Ranbir Singh Bahadur, Maharaja of Jind, GCIE, KCSI
- 1918-1926: Lieutenant-Colonel His Highness Farzand-i-Dilband, Rasikh ul-Itiqad-i- Daulat-i-Inglishia, Raja-i-Rajgan, Maharaja Sri Sir Ranbir Singh Rajendra Bahadur, Maharaja of Jind, GCIE, KCSI
- 1926-1937: Colonel His Highness Farzand-i-Dilband, Rasikh ul-Itiqad-i- Daulat-i-Inglishia, Raja-i-Rajgan, Maharaja Sri Sir Ranbir Singh Rajendra Bahadur, Maharaja of Jind, GCIE, KCSI
- 1937-1943: Colonel His Highness Farzand-i-Dilband, Rasikh ul-Itiqad-i- Daulat-i-Inglishia, Raja-i-Rajgan, Maharaja Sri Sir Ranbir Singh Rajendra Bahadur, Maharaja of Jind, GCSI, GCIE
- 1943-1948: Brigadier His Highness Farzand-i-Dilband, Rasikh ul-Itiqad-i- Daulat-i-Inglishia, Raja-i-Rajgan, Maharaja Sri Sir Ranbir Singh Rajendra Bahadur, Maharaja of Jind, GCSI, GCIE

== Honours ==
- Delhi Durbar gold medal-1903
- Delhi Durbar gold medal-1911
- Knight Grand Commander of the Order of the Indian Empire (GCIE)-1916
- King George V Silver Jubilee Medal-1935
- King George VI Coronation Medal-1937
- Knight Grand Commander of the Order of the Star of India (GCSI)-1937 (KCSI-1909)
- Indian Independence Medal-1947
