= Jind State =

Princely state of India (1763–1948)

Coordinates: 31°07′N 77°38′E

Jind & Sangrur State
- Princely State of British India (1809–1948)
- 1763–20 August 1948
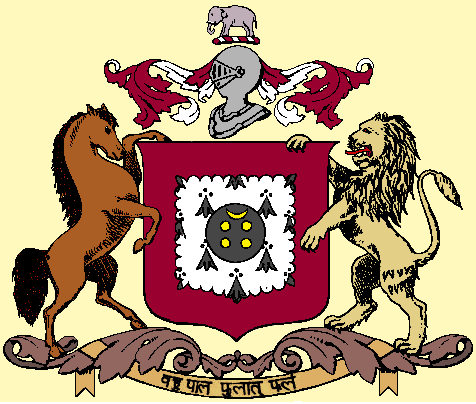
- Coat of arms

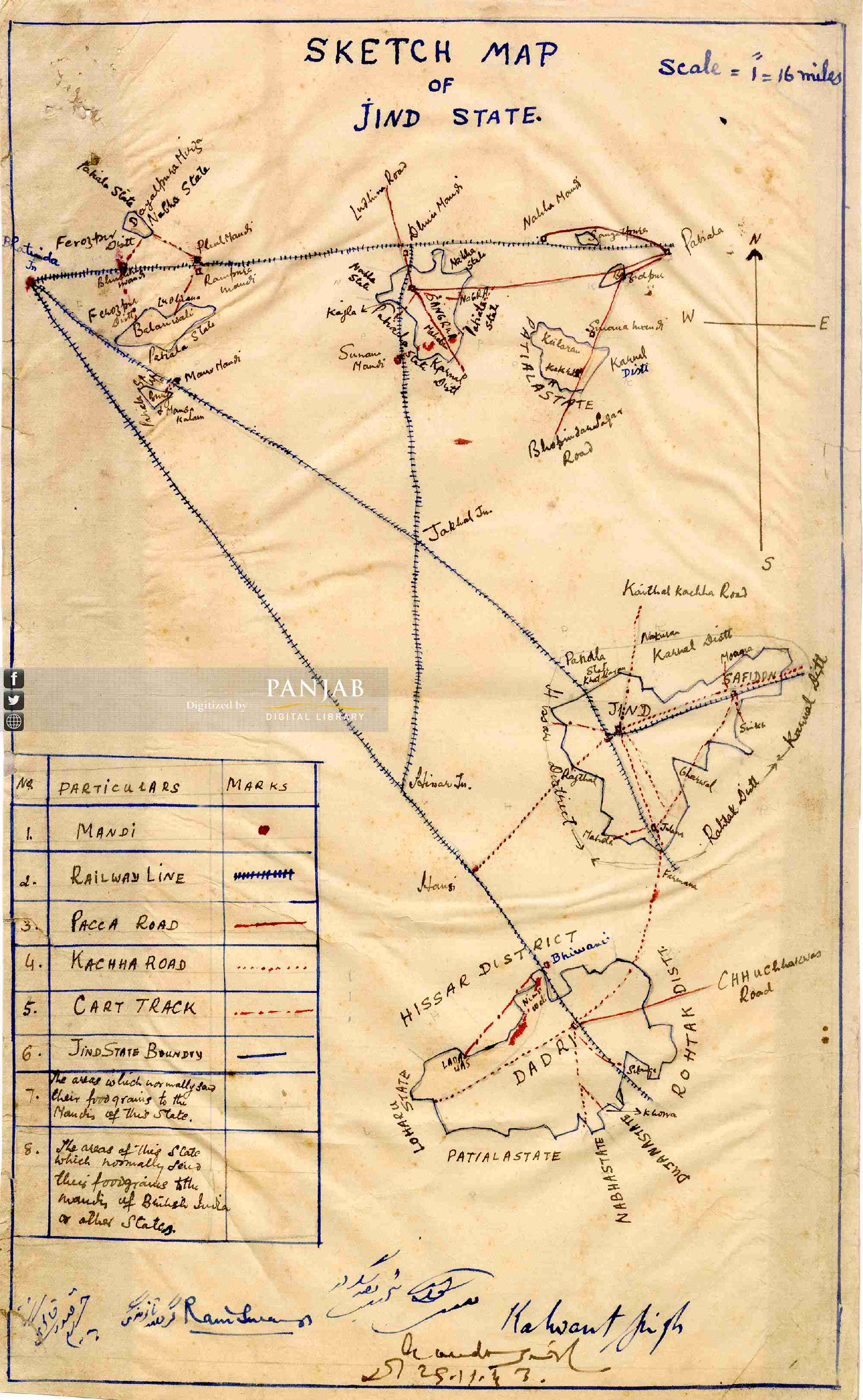
- Sketch map of Jind State
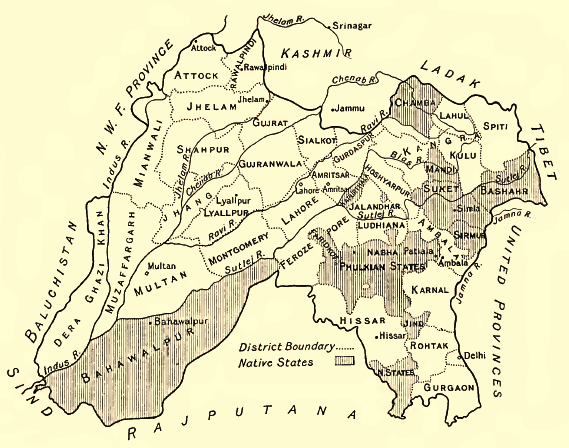
- Jind State in a 1911 map of Punjab
- Capital: Sangrur
- Area
  - 1931: 3,460 km^{2} (1,340 sq mi)
- Population
  - 1931: 324,676
- History
  - Established: 1763
  - Accession to India: 20 August 1948
Preceded by	Succeeded by
Maratha Empire; Phulkian Misl	India
- Today part of: India

Jind State (also spelled Jhind State) was a princely state situated in the Punjab Province of British India. Its territory now forms parts of the present-day Indian states of Punjab and Haryana. The state was 3,260 km^{2} (1,260 sq mi) in area and its annual income was Rs. 3,000,000 in the 1940s. This state was founded and ruled by the Sikh Jatts of Sidhu clan.

== Location ==
The area of the state was 1,259 square miles in total and it ranged from Dadri, Karnal, Safidon, and Sangrur.

== History ==
=== Origin ===
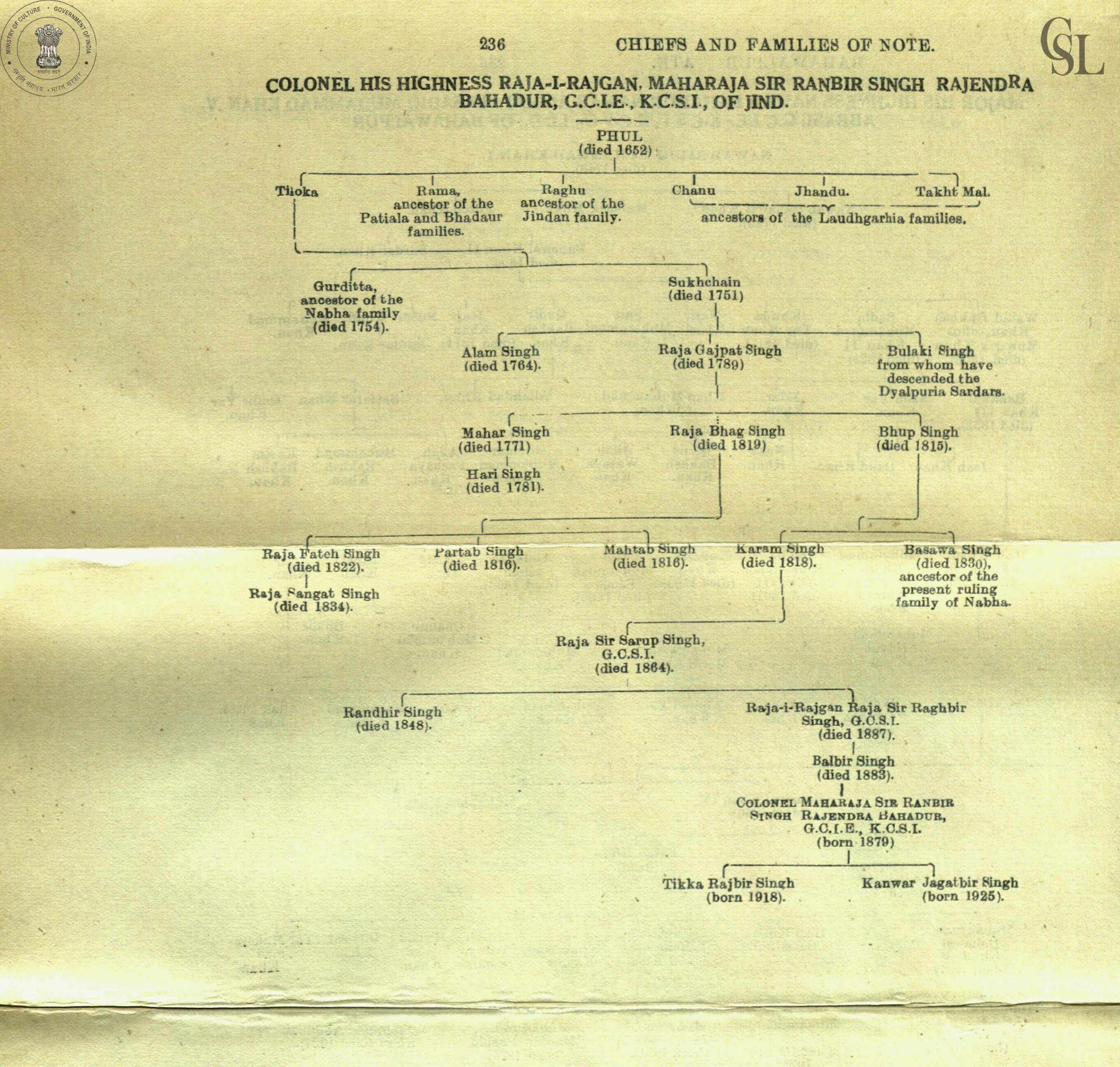
Genealogical pedigree (family-tree) of the ruling family of Jind State, Punjab, revised pedigree-table (1940)

The ruling house of Jind belonged to the Phulkian dynasty, sharing with the Nabha rulers a common ancestor named Tiloka. Tiloka was the eldest son of Phul Sidhu of the Phulkian Misl. The Jind rulers descended from Sukhchain Singh, the younger son of Tiloka. The Jind State was founded in 1763 by Gajpat Singh after the fall of Sirhind. Other sources give a date of 1768 for the founding of the state.

Gajpat Singh, son of Sukhchain Singh and great-grandson of Phul, launched a rebellion against the hostile authority based out of Sirhind. The rebellion was a Sikh coalition against the Afghan governors of Jind State. As a reward, Gajpat received a large tract of land, which included Jind and Safidon. Gajpat established his headquarters at Jind, building a large, brick fort at the location.

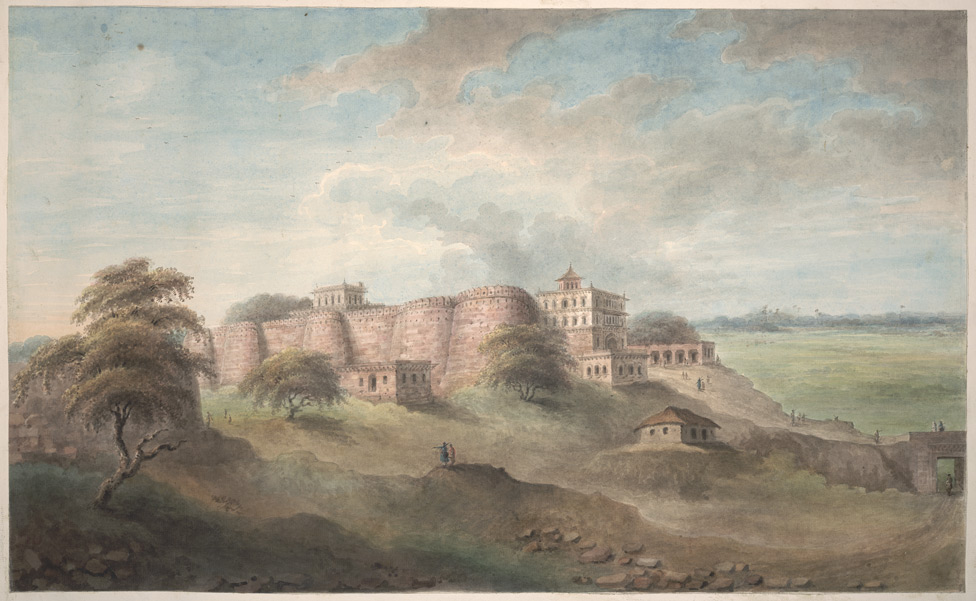
View of the fortress and palace of Jind State, 1815

He established the state in 1763 or 1768 and made Sangrur its capital. Gajpat was bestowed with the title of Raja by the Mughal emperor Shah Alam in the year 1772. As a mark of sovereignty, the Sikh raja minted coins bearing his name. Shortly after being bestowed with the raja title by the Mughals, Jind was attacked by Rahim Dad Khan, the governor of Hansi, who was killed in action. In 1774, a dispute arose between Jind and Nabha states. The precarious intra-Phulkian situation led to Gajpat Singh of Jind sending troops against Hamir Singh of Nabha, with the former taking possession of Imloh, Bhadson, and Sangrur from the latter's control. However, the ruler of Patiala State and influential members of the family led to Imloh and Bhadson being returned to Nabha's rule. Sangrur remained with Jind and was not given back to Nabha. A daughter of Gajpat Singh of Jind married Maha Singh of the Sukerchakia Misl and was the mother of Ranjit Singh.

Gajpat Singh ordered the raising of several fortresses, whom were constructed using lakhauri (thin burnt-clay) bricks in the year 1775. One of the forts was built to the left of the present-day Rani Talab and the second was built to the right of present-day Tanga Chowk. There was a family connection shared between Jind State and the Sukerchakia Misl, due to the fact that Gajpat's daughter, Raj Kaur, was the mother of Maharaja Ranjit Singh whom founded the Sikh Empire.

Gajpat Singh died in 1786.

After the passing of Gajpat, his son Bhag Singh succeeded to the throne of Jind in 1789. Bhag Singh is notable as being the first cis-Sutlej or Phulkian Sikh ruler to develop amicable ties with the British East India Company, which developed into a state of allyship between the two parties.

=== British era ===
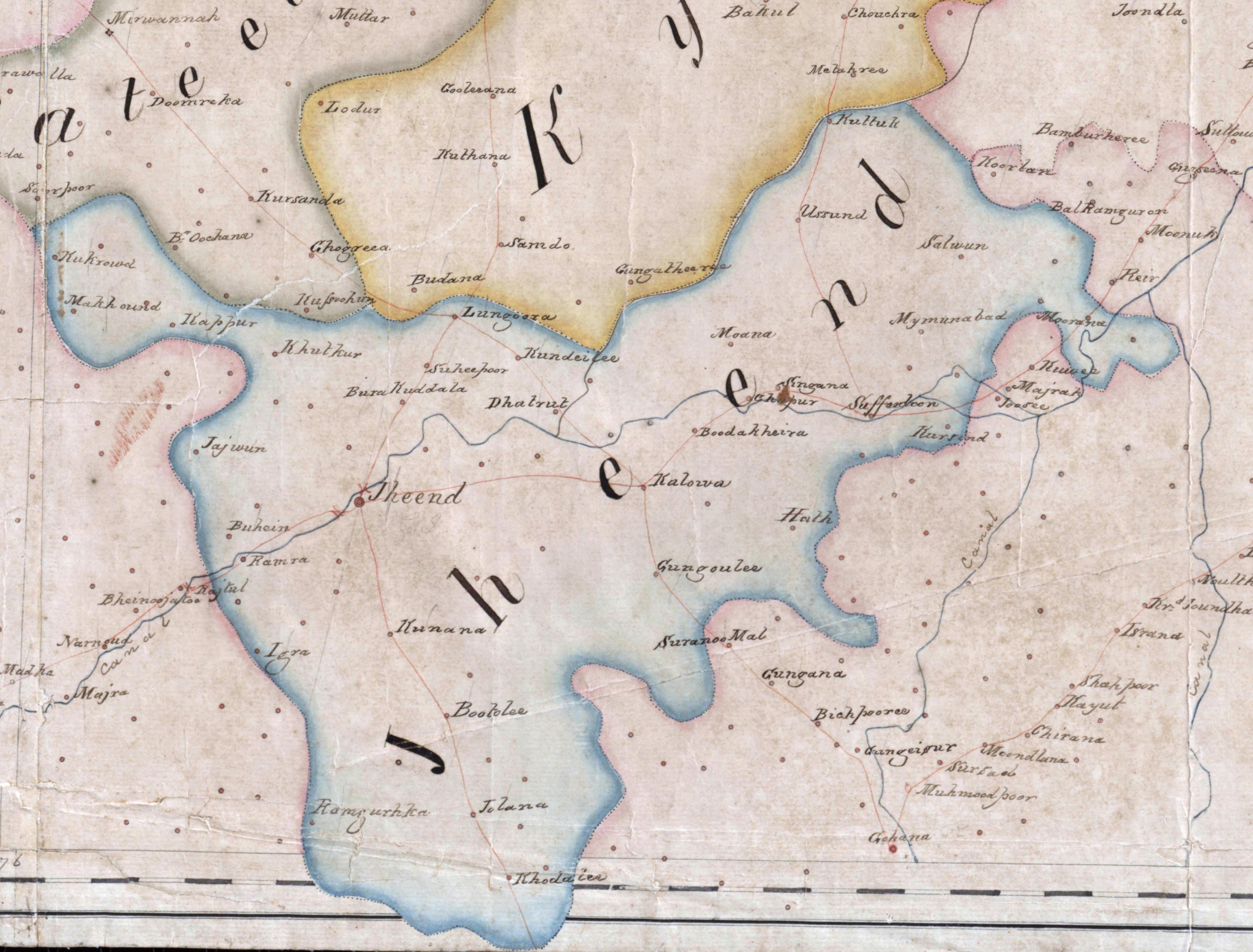
Detail of the main, continuous tract of territory of Jind State from a map created by the British East India Company, ca.1829–1835 (the state also held many exclave territories that can be seen in the full-map).

It was part of the Cis-Sutlej states until 25 April 1809, when it became a British protectorate. After Bhag Singh died, he would be succeeded by Fateh Singh, who in-turn was followed by Sangat Singh. After the death of Raja Sangat Singh in 1834, some parts of the state were taken over by the British due to the absence of a direct heir. The throne was later gone to his cousin, Swarup Singh. Then the throne passed to Swarup's son, Raghubir Singh. Raghubir Singh did produce an immediate heir in the form of a son named Balbir Singh, but his son had died while young so the line of succession passed to his grandson, Ranbir Singh, who is described as a "philanderer, an extravagant and a philanthropist". Ranbir is noted for being the longest reigning ruler of the Phulkian dynasty. He had 12 children with four wives.

When Kaithal was annexed in 1843, the Mahalan Ghabdan pargana was given to Jind State in exchange for a part of Saffdon.

Indian painter Sita Ram produced watercolours of the local scenery (landscape and architecture) of Jind State between June 1814 to early October 1815.

At the Ambala Darbar held in Ambala between 18–20 January 1860, a decision was made to exempt Jind, Patiala, and Nabha states from the doctrine-of-lapse.

During the First World War, the Jind Imperial Service Regiment saw conflict. The state was awarded with a fifteen-gun salute.

On 20 August 1948, with the signing of the instrument of accession, Jind became a part of the Patiala and East Punjab States Union of the newly independent India on 15 July 1948.

Postage stamps prior to King George V consisted of Indian stamps over printed as "Jhind State", with the letter 'H' in the name. On the George V stamps, the 'H' is omitted and is overprinted as "Jind State" (Reference actual stamps from the Victorian, Edward VII and George V eras).

=== Post-independence ===
Ranbir Singh died on 31 March 1948, shortly after he signed the instrument of accession. He was succeeded by his son Rajbir Singh. Rajbir died in 1959 and in-turn was succeeded by his brother named Jagatbir Singh. However, Rajbir's son named Satbir Singh, claims to have been crowned as a successor to his father, leading to a dispute between the brother and son of the late Rajbir.

After the division of Punjab in 1966, the former territories of Jind State were given to the then newly formed state of Haryana. Thus, Jind town and district now form a part of Indian state of Haryana.

The family of the former Jind rulers are mired in family divisions and conflicts over shares of their declining wealth. The Jind royals currently reside at Raja ki Kothi on Amarhedi Road.

== Economy ==
The revenue per annum of Jind State was around 2,800,000 rupees.

== Heritage conservation ==
Many monuments and structures related to the erstwhile Jind state lie in disrepair and disregard and few efforts are being taken to conserve them, in-contrast to the heritage of Patiala and Nabha states. Two historical forts (both constructed in 1775 and were located near Rani Talab and Tanga Chowk) related to the history of the state were demolished in the 1990s to make way for newer developments, such as shopping bazaars, a Doordarshan Relay Centre, and parks. There was also a third Jind fort that was demolished in the 1990s as well, it was located beside the fort near Rani Talab. The land the former forts stood on has also suffered from illegal encroachments. Many historical artefacts related to the state have been looted and smuggled. The city of Jind was also known for its three city-gates connected by a border wall, which were named Jhanjh Gate, Ramrai Gate, and Safidon Gate, however these gates have not survived to the present-day. Efforts are ongoing to have the ASI declare the buildings of Rani Talab, Raja-Ki-Kothi, and Khunga Kothi as protected heritage sites. Indo-Saracenic buildings of Jind have fallen into a decrepit condition.

== List of rulers ==
Name (Birth–Death)	Portrait	Reign		Enthronement	Note(s)	Reference
Name (Birth–Death)	Portrait	Start date	End date	Enthronement	Note(s)	Reference
Sardars
Sukhchain Singh (1683–1758)		?	1758			
Rajas
Gajpat Singh (15 April 1738 – 11 November 1789)		1758	1789			
Bhag Singh (23 September 1760 – 16 June 1819)		1789	1819	November 1789		
Fateh Singh (6 May 1789 – 3 February 1822)		1819	1822			
Sangat Singh (16 July 1810 – 4/5 November 1834)		1822	1834	30 July 1822		
Swarup Singh (30 May 1812 – 26 January 1864)		1834	1864	April 1837		
Raghubir Singh (1832 – 7 March 1887)		1864	1887	31 March 1864		
Ranbir Singh (11 October 1879 – 1 April 1948)		1887	1948	27 February 1888		
Titular
Rajbir Singh (1948 – 1959)		1948	1959			
Satbir Singh (1940–2023)		1959	2023		Upon the death of his father, Rajbir Singh, in 1959, Yadavindra Singh, the Maharaja of Patiala, installed him as the Maharaja of Jind. His succession was recognized by the President of India on 12 October 1959.	

=== Other titular claimants ===
Other titular claimants
9	Rajbir Singh	1948–1959
10	Jagatbir Singh (disputed) (Note: Rajbir's other son Satbir Singh also claims to have been crowned.)	1959 – ?
11	Rambir Singh (1944–1992)	? – 1992
12	Gajraj Singh (1981–2016)	1992–2016
13	Jagbir Singh Sidhu (1979–2018)	2016–2018
14	Gunveer Singh (born 2014)	2018 – present

== Administrative divisions and boundaries ==
During the British era (1901), Jind State was divided into two nizāmats (districts): Sangrur and Jind. Each nizāmat was further subdivided into tahsils, which were not contiguous with each other, The State contained 7 towns and 439 villages, with a total physical area of 1,268 square miles:

1901 State Administration					
No	District/Nizāmat	Tahsil	Remark	Today	
I	Sangrur Nizāmat	Sangrur	Capital; included all scattered territories	Punjab	Bathinda, Patiala, Sangrur District
II	Jind Nizāmat	Jind	Former capital	Haryana	Jind District
III	Jind Nizāmat	Dadri	Gained in 1858; southern enclave	Haryana	Charkhi Dadri District

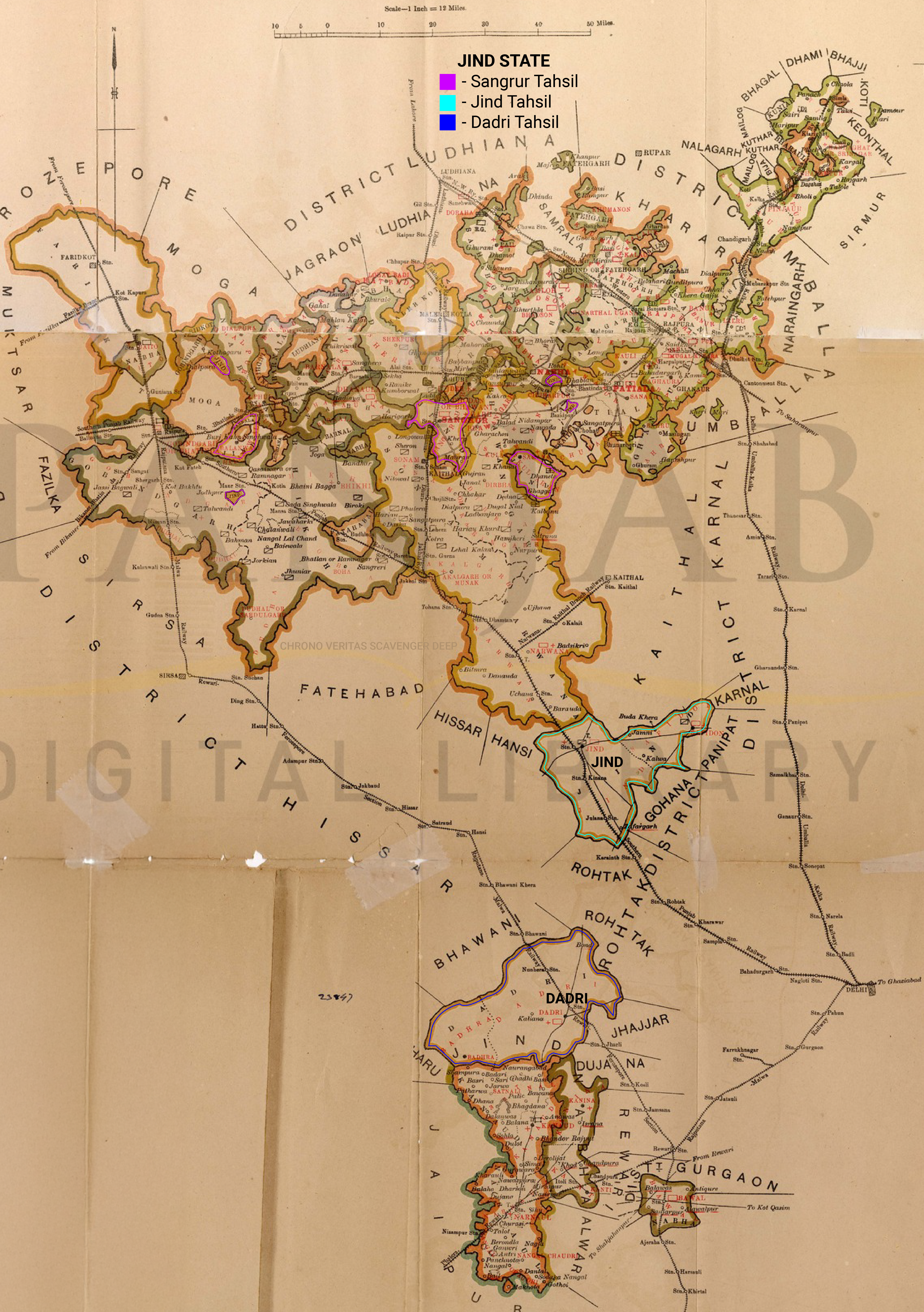
Map of mark, Jind State on punjab state (1909) Sangrur, Jind, and Dadri tahsils

=== I. Sangrur Tahsil ===
Sangrur Tahsil was one of the three tahsils of Jind State and was part of the Sangrur Nizāmat. It was not in one piece but made up of four separate areas, surrounded by British territory and lands of Patiala and Nabha States.

1. The Sangrur Ilāqa was the main region of the state and included the capital town of Sangrur. It was bordered to the North: Patiala and Nabha territories, East: Bhawanigarh Nizāmat of Patiala ,South: Sunam Tahsil of Patiala and the village of Khadial (Kaithal Tahsil, Karnal District – former Kaithal state enclave), West: Barnala Tahsil of Patiala & Dhanaula Thana of Nabha. The ilāqa comprised 1 Sangrur town and 43 villages including Ghabdan, badrukha village, covering 109 square miles, with a population of 36,598 according to the 1901 Census. Today, this area forms part of Sunam and Sangrur tahsils in Sangrur district.
2. The Kularan Ilāqa was located about 20 miles east of Sangrur and was almost completely surrounded by Patiala territory, with one side bordering Kaithal Tahsil. It included 33 villages, had a population of 14,976, and covered an area of 66 square miles. It is located near the town of Samana and today is part of Samana Tahsil in Patiala district.
3. The Wazidpur Ilāqa was a small, fragmented area made up of two parts of Jind State. The northern part had four villages, and the southern part had three villages, totaling seven villages. The area covered just 9 square miles and had a population of 2,361 in 1901. Today, these areas are near Patiala town, between Patiala and Samana, and part of Patiala district.
4. The Balanwali Ilāqa was a large, detached area located 48 miles west of Sangrur, made up of three separate parts of state territory. Together, the Balanwali Ilāqa covered 57 square miles and had a population of 10,746 in 1901.
  - The main area included the town of Balanwali and 10 villages. It was bordered on the northeast by Nabha State, on the east and south by Patiala, and on the west by the Mehraj pargana of Moga Tahsil in Ferozepore District. Today, this area is part of Rampura Phul Tahsil in Bathinda district.
  - Another part lay to the north, containing the large village of Dialpura, held as Jagir by the Sardars of Dailpura. It was bordered by Nabha on the southeast, the Mehraj pargana of Ferozepore on the southwest, and Patiala on the northwest. Today, it falls within Rampura Tahsil of Bathinda district and is known as Dyalpura Mirza village and its surrounding area.
  - The third part, south of Balanwali, included two isolated villages, Mansa and Burj, both surrounded entirely by Patiala territory. Today, these villages are part of Maur Tahsil, Bathinda district, known as Mansa Kalana and Burj village.

The tahsil of Sangrur lies almost entirely in the great tract known as the Jangal, with only seven villages around wazidpur situated in the Pawadh region. At that time, Sangrur Tahsil included 95 villages and 2 towns (Sangrur, Balanwali), covering a total area of 241 square miles (19% of the state) with a population of 64,681 (22.93% of the state) in 1901.

Today, the former Sangrur Tahsil of Jind State lies entirely in Punjab, India with parts falling within Sangrur, Patiala & Bathinda District.

=== II. Jind Tahsil ===
Jind Tahsil was a compact and connected triangular part of state, unlike Sangrur Tahsil, which was divided into parts. It was mostly surrounded by British and Patiala state territories and bordered by: North: Narwana Tahsil (Patiala state) and Kaithal Tahsil (Karnal), East: Panipat Tahsil (Karnal), South-East: Gohana Sub-Tahsil(Rohtak), South: Rohtak Tahsil (Rohtak), West: Hansi Tahsil (Hissar District).

Villages in Jind Tahsil were historically grouped into tappās, The tappās in Jind Tahsil were:

Tappā Name	No. of Villages	Tappā Name	No. of V.	Tappā Name	No. of V.	Tappā Name	No. of V.
Chahutra	2	Bārah	15	Lājwāna Kalān	13	Kalwa	13
Dhāk	1	Kānāna	21	Kānāna	21	Saffidon	26
Kandeḷa	31	Rām Rāi	18	Hat	12	Total	165

Jind Tahsil lies entirely in the Bangar region. It included the two towns of Jind and Safidon, along with 163 villages. The tahsil covered 464 square miles area (36.62% of the state) and had a population of 124,954 (44.3% of the state) in 1901.

Today, the entire tahsil lies in Haryana, within Jind district.

=== III. Dadri Tahsil ===
Dādri Tahsil was also a compact and contiguous part of State, unlike Sangrur Tahsil, in parts. It lay to the south of Jind Tahsil and was separated from it by Rohtak Tahsil of British territory, making it another enclave of the state. This tahsil was bordered by: East: Jhajjar Tahsil (Rohtak), North-West: Bhawani Tahsil (Hissar District) South: Duana State, Bawal Nizāmat (Nabha State) & Mahendragarth Nizāmat (Patiala State), West: Loharu State.

Villages in Dadri Tahsil were also grouped into tappās, The tappās in Jind Tahsil were:

Tappā Name	No. of Villages	Tappā Name	Number of Vill.	Tappā Name	Number of V.
Phoghāt	20	Sangwān	55	Pachisi	8
Punwār	31	Sheorān	43	Satganwa	9
Chogānwā	6	Haweli	11	Total	183

Dadri Tahsil lies in the Bagar region, Historically and in the present day, it is also known as Dalmia Dadri or Charkhi Dadri. It included 3 towns (Dadri, Kalyana, Baund) and 181 villages, covering a total area of 562 square miles (44.35% of the state) and had a population of 120,451 (32.75%) according to the 1901 census.

Today, the entire tahsil lies in Haryana, mostly within Charkhi Dadri district.

== Demographics ==
Religious groups in Jind State (British Punjab province era)
Religious group	1881		1891		1901		1911		1921		1931		1941	
Religious group	Pop.	%	Pop.	%	Pop.	%	Pop.	%	Pop.	%	Pop.	%	Pop.	%
Hinduism (Note: 1931-1941: Including Ad-Dharmis)	210,627	84.3%	230,846	81.12%	211,963	75.16%	210,222	77.36%	234,721	76.16%	243,561	75.02%	268,355	74.17%
Islam	34,247	13.71%	38,508	13.53%	38,717	13.73%	37,520	13.81%	43,251	14.03%	46,002	14.17%	50,972	14.09%
Sikhism	4,335	1.73%	15,020	5.28%	29,975	10.63%	22,566	8.3%	28,026	9.09%	33,290	10.25%	40,981	11.33%
Jainism	649	0.26%	173	0.06%	1,258	0.45%	1,233	0.45%	1,548	0.5%	1,613	0.5%	1,294	0.36%
Christianity	3	0%	7	0%	80	0.03%	187	0.07%	637	0.21%	210	0.06%	161	0.04%
Zoroastrianism	0	0%	0	0%	0	0%	0	0%	0	0%	0	0%	3	0%
Buddhism	0	0%	0	0%	0	0%	0	0%	0	0%	0	0%	3	0%
Judaism	—N/a	—N/a	6	0%	0	0%	0	0%	0	0%	0	0%	0	0%
Others	1	0%	0	0%	10	0%	0	0%	0	0%	0	0%	43	0.01%
Total population	249,862	100%	284,560	100%	282,003	100%	271,728	100%	308,183	100%	324,676	100%	361,812	100%
Note: British Punjab province era district borders are not an exact match in the present-day due to various bifurcations to district borders – which since created new districts – throughout the historic Punjab Province region during the post-independence era that have taken into account population increases.

== Gallery ==
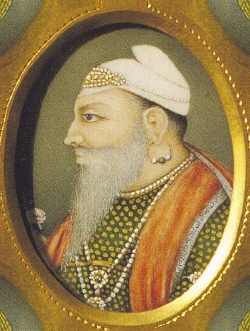
Raja Gajpat Singh of Jind State

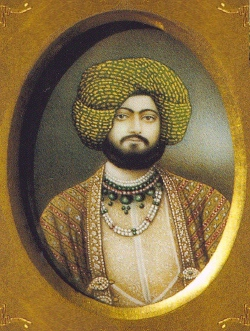
Raja Sangat Singh of Jind State

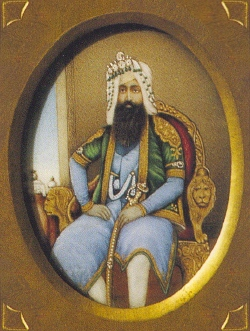
Raja Swarup Singh of Jind State

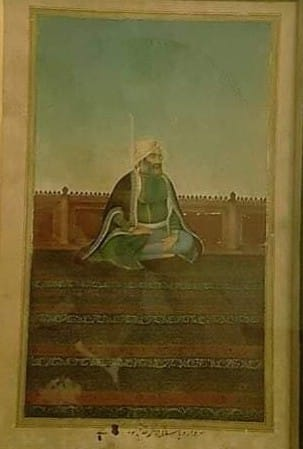
Miniature painting of Sardar Daya Singh Sibia of Ramgarh, revenue minister of Jind State during the reign of Maharaja Raghubir Singh

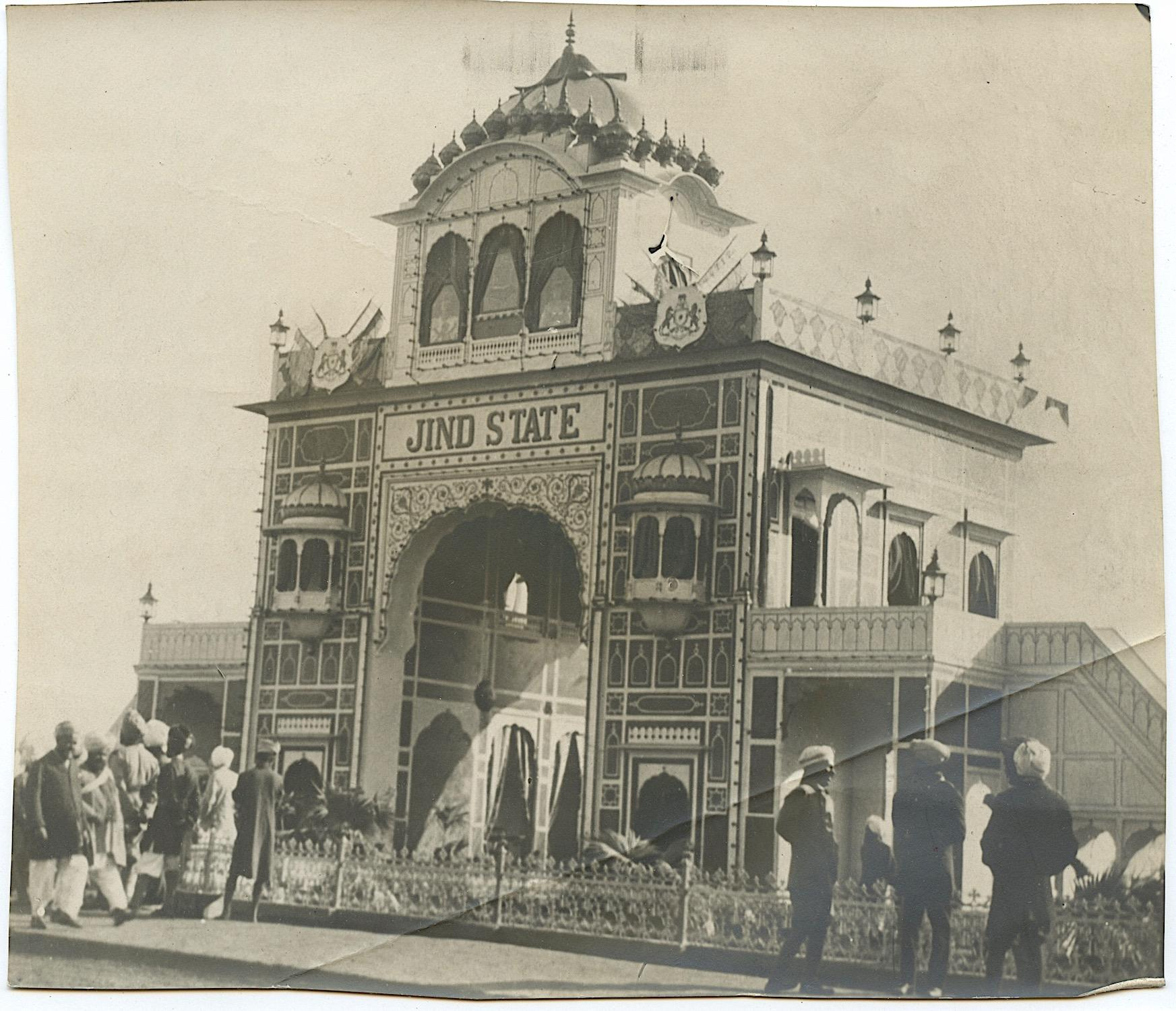
Photograph taken in the erstwhile Jind State

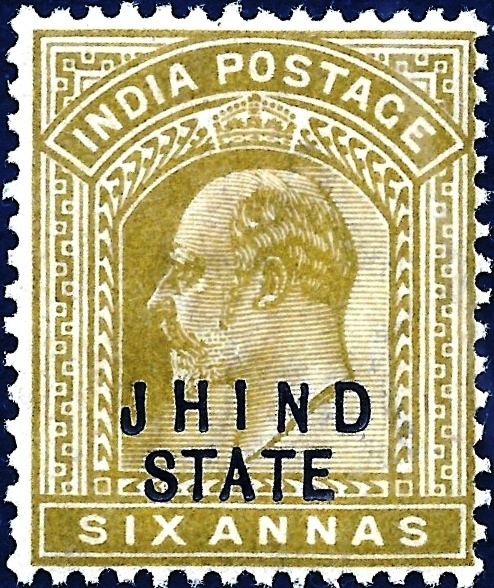
Stamp of the Jind State. Edward VII, 1905

== See also ==
- Political integration of India
- Phulkian sardars
- Patiala State
- Nabha State
- Faridkot State
- Malaudh
- Bhadaur
- Kaithal
- Cis-Sutlej states
