= Sidhu =

Jat clan in India and Pakistan

- Jat clan
- Location: Punjab
- Jathera: Khiwa Rao
- Parent tribe: Bhatti, Gill Jats
- Branches: Brar (Baryar)
- Language: Punjabi
- Religion: Hinduism • Islam • Sikhism
- Surnames: Sidhu

Sidhu is a Punjabi Jat clan (got) found in Punjab. The Sidhus have had a significant impact on Sikh history. The clan can be divided into sub-clans, known as moohis, with the principal ones being: Maloke, Khokharke, Brar, Saboke, Mohanke, Phoolke, Pirke, and Rosike.

During British Raj, historians like H. A. Rose and Alexander Cunningham note an account of local bards (bhatts), which state the clan descends from a Bhatti clan progenitor named Sidhu Rao, whom had maternal alliance with Gill Jats. Their descendants are thus the Sidhu Jats.

The Sidhu clan held sway in the Ferozepur area in the late medieval period. Chaudhary Phul of the Sidhu-Brar clan established the Phulkian Misl, one of the misls (confederacies) of the Sikh Confederacy. His descendants, the Phulkian Maharajas, became the kings of the princely states of Faridkot, Jind, Nabha, Malaudh and Patiala.

== People ==
- Amandeep Sidhu
- Barkat Sidhu
- Deep Sidhu
- Harinder Sidhu
- Harry Sidhu
- Jagdeep Sidhu
- Navjot Singh Sidhu
- Sidhu Moose Wala
- Zaheer Ahmad Babar Sidhu

== See also ==
- Sarai Sidhu
