= Phulkian dynasty =

Former Punjabi royal dynasty

Phulkian
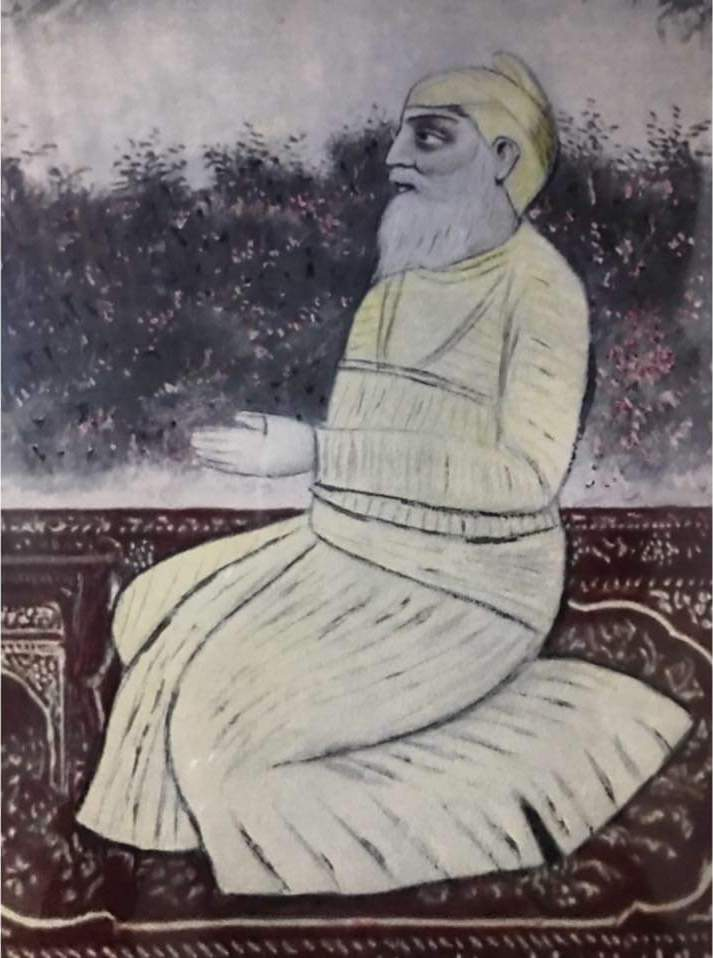
- Portrait of Chaudhary Phul Sidhu-Brar, ancestor of the Phulkian dynasty
- Country: Patiala State; Nabha State; Jind State; Faridkot State; Kaithal State
- Place of origin: Phulkian Misl, Punjab
- Founded: 1627
- Founder: Phul Sidhu-Brar
- Titles: Maharaja of Patiala; Maharaja of Nabha; Maharaja of Jind; Raja of Faridkot
- Dissolution: 1971

The Phulkian dynasty (or Phoolkian) of Maharajas or sardars were Sikh Jat royals and aristocrats in the Punjab region of India. Members of the dynasty ruled the Phulkian states of Badrukhan, Bhadaur, Faridkot, Jind, Malaudh, Nabha, and Patiala, allying themselves with the British Empire according to the terms of the Cis-Sutlej treaty of 1809. The dynasty is named after Phul Sidhu-Brar, the 17th-century common ancestor of the Phulkian states and the founder of the Phulkian Misl. After India's independence in 1947, the Phulkian states had all acceded to India by 1948. Members of the various royal families of the Phulkian dynasty retained their titles until 1971, when the Government of India abolished their titles with the 26th Amendment to the Constitution of India.

== Lineage ==
=== Historical ===
Members of the Phulkian dynasty were descendants from Hem, a younger son of Rawal Jaisal Singh, the founder and first ruler of the Kingdom of Jaisalmer (r. 1156–1168), who migrated to the present-day Malwa region in Punjab. The dynasty further traces its lineage to Rao Bhati, a 3rd-century Hindu monarch.

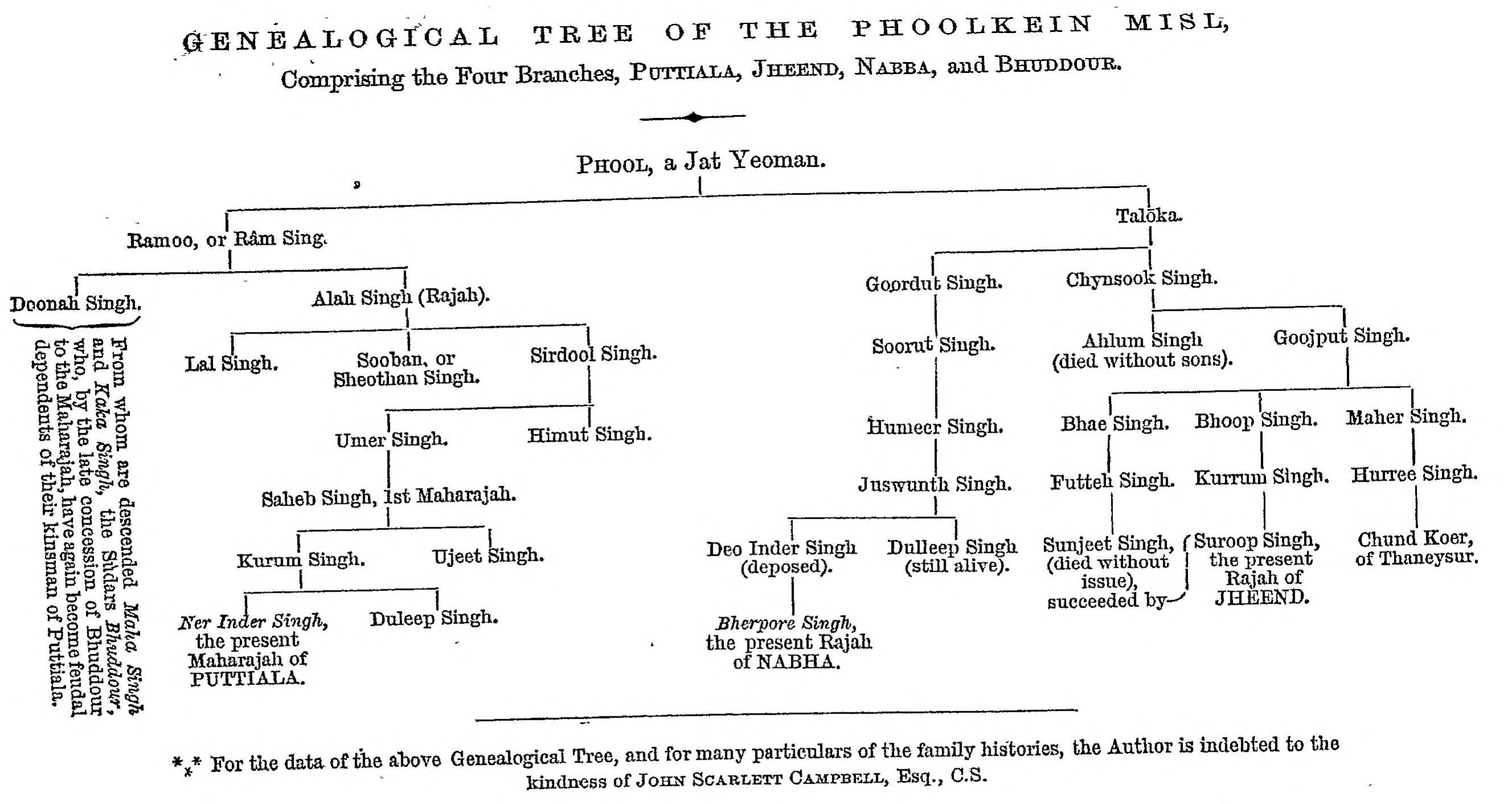
Genealogical familial tree of the Phulkian dynasty by John Cave-Browne, ca.1861

The rulers of the Phulkian states shared a common ancestor, the 17th-century Chaudhary Phul Sidhu-Brar, also known as Baba Phul (1627–1689). Baba Phul was the grandson of a Sikh of Guru Hargobind named Mohan. Mohan founded the settlement of Mehraj in 1627, named after his great-grandfather, Mehraj. In 1631, it is claimed that Mohan once sought the assistance of the sixth Sikh guru against hostile neighbours, who provided military help in the form of 500-men. Another tale connects Phul to the Sikh gurus: it is said that Phul and his brother Sandli were once blessed by Guru Har Rai after being presented to the guru as two starving orphans by their uncle Kala. Sikhs believe the blessing of Guru Har Rai bestowed on the young Phul allowed his descendants to found dynasties and become prosperous rulers.

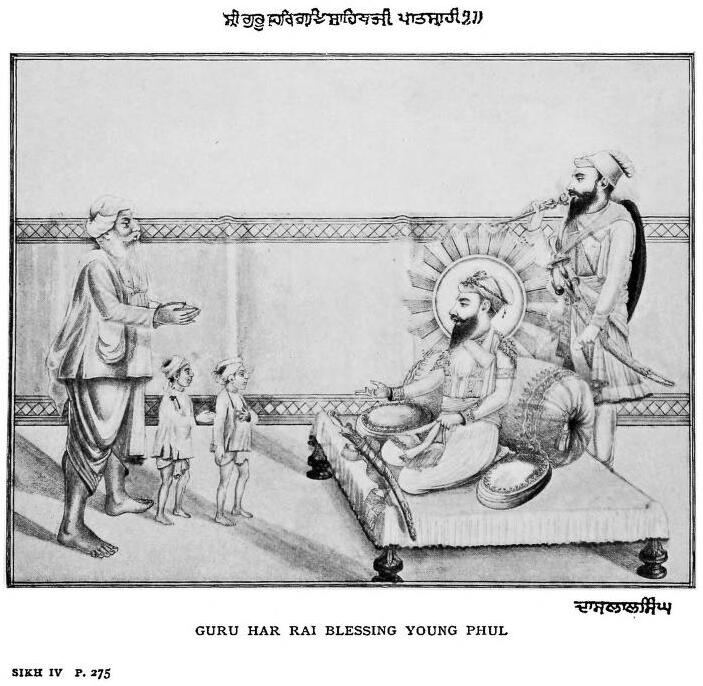
Illustration of Guru Har Rai blessing a young Phul Sidhu-Brar, from 'The Sikh Religion' (1909)

Baba Phul was the founder of the Phulkian Misl, which was named after him. He lived through the times of Guru Hargobind, the sixth Guru of the Sikh religion as well as Guru Har Rai, the seventh Guru. According to historical accounts, Phul had received blessings from both Guru Hargobind and Guru Har Rai. Eventually, Phul received the official designation of Chaudari from the Mughals and became a tributary sardar of them. Through his eldest son, Tiloka, Phul is the ancestor of the rulers of Nabha, Jind and Badrukhan. Through his second son, Rama, Phul is the ancestor of the rulers of Patiala, Malaudh and Bhadaur.

=== Mythological ===
Rao Bhati further claimed to be a direct descendant of Yadu, a mythological Hindu monarch. Yadu was the founder of the mythological Yadu dynasty, a branch of the legendary Lunar dynasty (IAST: Candravaṃśa), according to Hindu mythology. The Phulkian dynasty also claimed direct descent from Krishna, who was himself a direct descendant of Yadu according to Hindu tradition.

== History ==
=== Phulkian Misl ===
The Phulkian Misl was a Sikh Misl founded by Choudhary Phul Sidhu-Brar, also known as Baba Phul or Phul Singh, and named after him. It was established by Jats. A claimed descendant of the Bhati Rajputs, Phul was a direct descendant of Rawal Jaisal Singh, the founder and first ruler of the Kingdom of Jaisalmer. Phul's descendants became the royal families of the Phulkian dynasty states, which included the states of Patiala, Nabha, and Jind. Historians have disputed whether the Phulkian Misl was ever a true Sikh Misl, as its practices and policies were more centralized and akin to a petty kingdom than those of a true Sikh Misl.

==== Territory ====
The misl originated from Phul in Malwa. The Phulkians held territory in southern Malwa. The Phulkian Misl controlled areas between Sirhind and Delhi, forming the Sikh kingdoms of Patiala, Nabha, Jind, and Kaithal.

==== Misl status dispute ====
Some historians, such as Kirpal Singh, claim the Phulkians were never truly a "Misl" at all. Historian Surjit Singh Gandhi also claimed that the Phulkian Misl was never a true Misl because they shared almost no common practices with the other Sikh Misls, and the administrative nature of the Phulkian Misl's political state varied considerably from that of the other Misls.

Gandhi based his arguments on various facts and events. When the Sikh Misls divided themselves into the Buddha Dal and Taruna Dal of the Dal Khalsa in 1734, no Phulkian leader was represented, and there was no Phulkian presence in the Dal Khalsa in 1748. Phulkian leaders did not attend Sarbat Khalsa meetings or distribute loot and territory among their followers, instead adopting Mughal practices of appropriating resources for themselves and rewarding their men with payments and Jagirs. While other Misls fought relentlessly against the Mughal Empire and the Durrani Empire, the Phulkian chiefs maintained good relations with these imperial powers, obtained titles from them. Unlike other Misls, they did not inscribe the names of the Sikh gurus on their coins but instead issued coins in the names of rulers of the Mughal Empire and Durrani Empire. In the entire 18th century, none of the Phulkian leaders visited Sikhism's holy cities of Anandpur and Amritsar, but they frequently visited and were visited by the Mughal and Durrani rulers.

=== Phulkian States ===
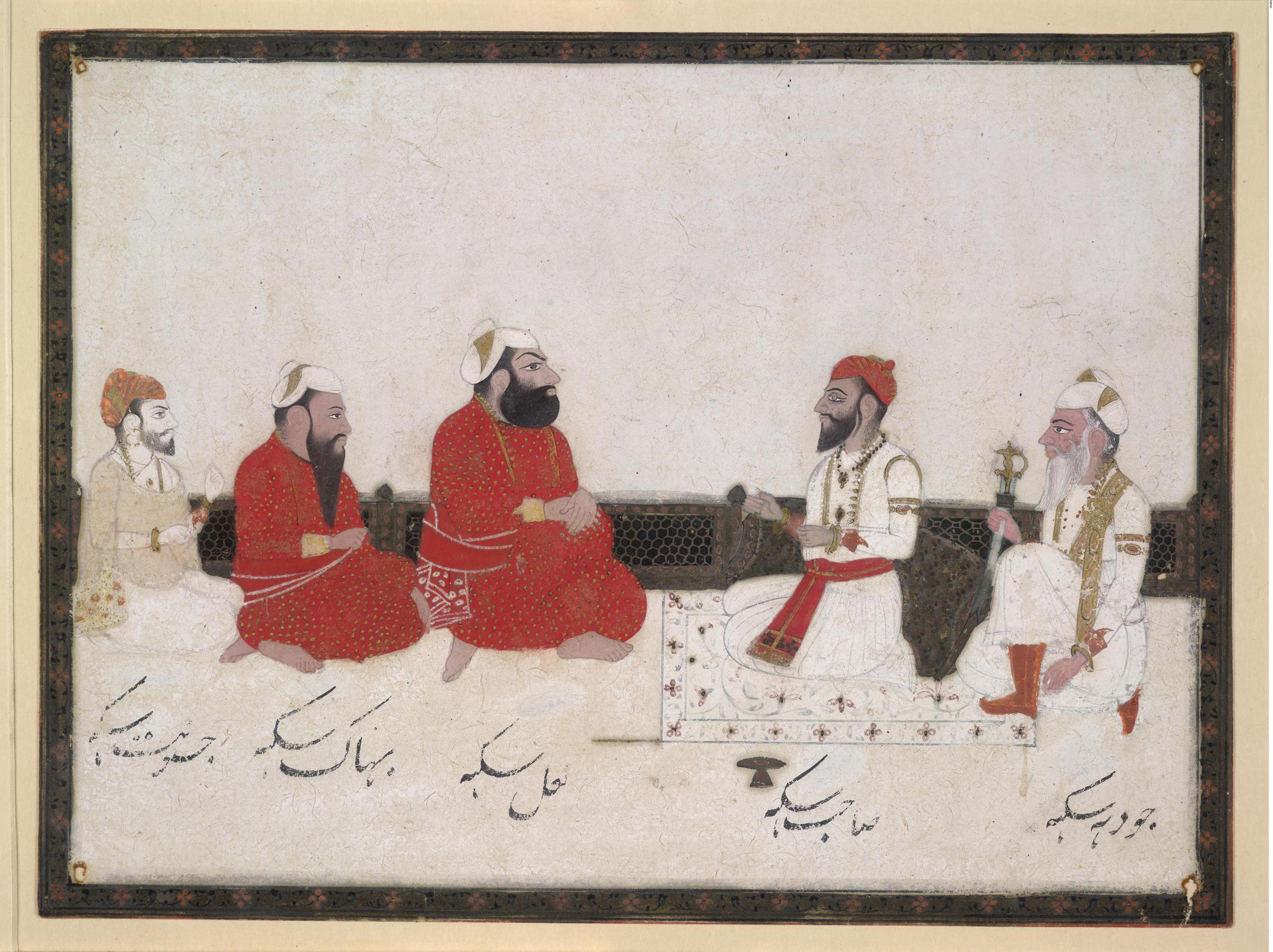
Painting depicting a meeting between Sahib Singh of Patiala State, Jodh Singh of Kalsia State, Lal Singh of Kaithal State, Mehak Singh, and Raja Jaswant Rao Holkar, ca.1850

In 1767, the city of Kaithal fell into the hands of the Phulkian chieftain, Desu Singh, who established Kaithal State.

In the early 19th century, the Phulkian states, concerned about the rising power of Maharaja Ranjit Singh, sought protection from the East India Company. Although Ranjit Singh was generally moderate towards the Phulkian rulers and willing to address their issues, his growing influence led to suspicions about his intentions. Consequently, the Cis-Sutlej states, including the Phulkian states, convened and decided to send a deputation to the British Resident in Delhi. The delegation pledged their loyalty to the British and sought their protection, leading to a treaty on 25 April 1809, where Ranjit Singh agreed not to extend his military campaigns into the Cis-Sutlej territories.

As the Phulkian states were freed from the threat of Ranjit Singh, internal conflicts among them surfaced, prompting further British intervention. By 22 August 1811, the British issued another proclamation to protect these states from each other, thereby enhancing their power of interference and control. Over time, these states transitioned from being independent rulers in a treaty alliance with the British to becoming dependencies, or what the British described as princely states, significantly diminishing their autonomy and consolidating British dominance in the Punjab region.

=== British Raj ===
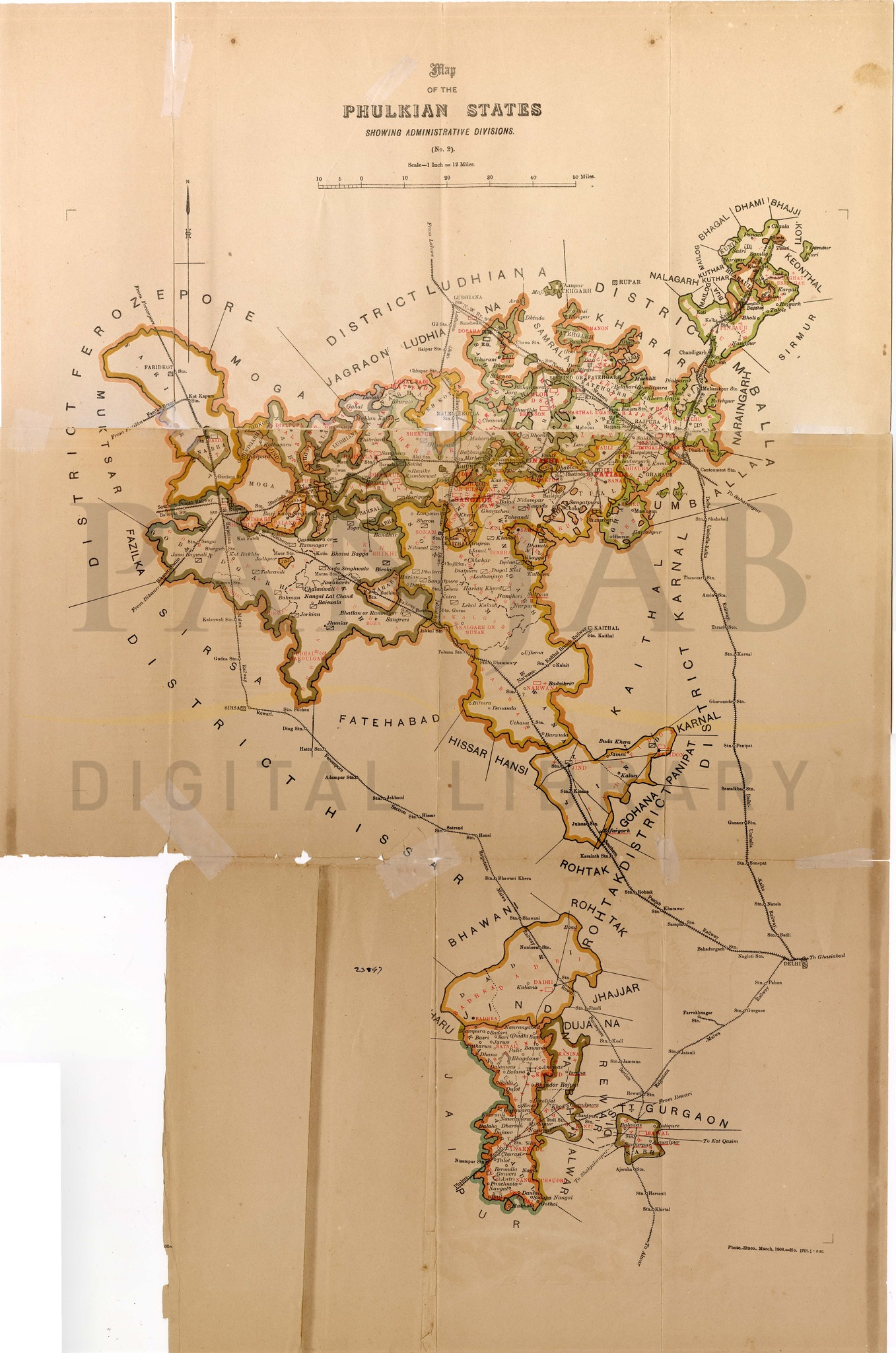
Map of the Phulkian States showing administrative divisions and railway lines from Lahore to Delhi through different cities, 1909

The Maharajas of the three largest Phulkian states (Patiala, Nabha and Jind) supported the East India Company during the Indian Rebellion of 1857, both with military forces and supplies, as well as by offering protection for European people in affected areas. In return, the three Maharajas were given additional territories, honours and titles by the British Raj.

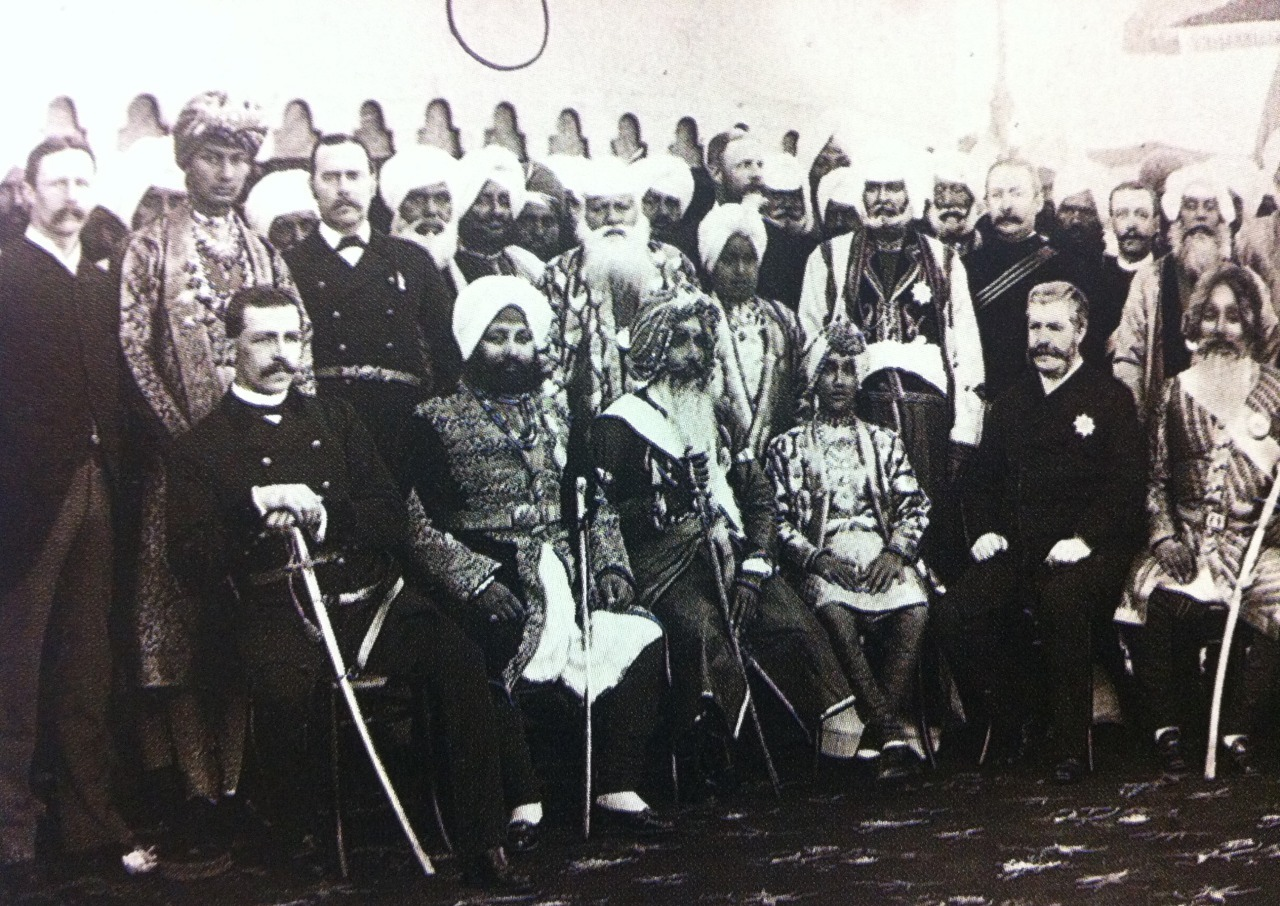
Detail of Bikram Singh of Faridkot State, Hira Singh of Nabha State, Rajinder Singh of Patiala State, Charles Aitchison (British lieutenant governor of Punjab), and Raghubir Singh of Jind State, from a photograph of Punjab's senior British administrators with rulers of the erstwhile Punjabi princely states, Rawalpindi, 1885

In 1858, the British Raj authorities rejected a petition to allow them to adopt heirs to ensure lines of succession. They believed that such processes could be dealt with on an ad hoc basis if and when the situation arose, and that to accept the petition would be contrary to the Doctrine of Lapse. The matter was eventually taken up by the government in Britain, who demanded that the Raj authorities should grant the petition in recognition of the considerable loyalty that had been demonstrated during the rebellion. Later, on 19 January 1860 at a durbar in Ambala, Charles Canning, the Governor-General of India, acceded to the request.

During the British Raj, the Phulkian states of Patiala, Nabha, and Jind were noted for their patronage of North Indian artists, musicians, and scholars at their court.

=== Abolition ===
By 1948, all of the Phulkian states had acceded to the India, which became independent in 1947. The royal families of the Phulkian dynasty retained their royal titles in India until 1971, when they were abolished with the 26th Amendment to the Constitution of India.

== Inter-state dispute ==
A dispute in the early 1920s between Bhupinder Singh, who had become Maharaja of Patiala in 1909, and his fellow Maharaja in Nabha, Ripudaman Singh, who became ruler in 1911, had significant ramifications both for relationships within the Sikh community and for British policy in the Punjab. According to historian Barbara Ramusack, the pair were "ambitious, arrogant, energetic, and jealous" and "shared the hypersensitivity on matters of izzat or honor and status common to most Indian princes".

What began initially as a war of words from around 1912 had become physical by the 1920s, with Bhupinder Singh complaining that the law courts of Ripudaman Singh had been falsely convicting Patiala police officers, as well as kidnapping girls from Patiala for the royal harem. On top of this, were frequent boundary disputes, which had been a feature of strife between the states for many years because of the way in which the territories intertwined.

There were numerous attempts, with varying degrees of formality, to resolve the dispute. These included high-level court meetings, independent mediators and Sikh community groups such as the Shiromani Gurdwara Parbandhak Committee (SGPC). The situation was eventually referred to the British authorities in 1923, who instituted a quasi-judicial inquiry the conclusions of which generally supported the grievances raised by Bhupinder Singh and were critical of how Ripudaman Singh was administering his state and attempting to undermine the position of Patiala. Ripudaman, who had gained support from some extremist Akalis, was told that the British would formally intervene unless he abdicated and that this would lead to him being officially deposed.

The abdication on 8 July 1923, which was effectively forced upon him, saw the British take over the administration of Nabha and caused uproar in Punjab. People in Punjab protested in what they considered to be unwarranted political interference, and lauded Ripudaman Singh both as a Sikh leader and a nationalist. Newspapers in the region, with the support of the SGPC, pointed to his past favouring of the views of nationalists such as Gopal Krishna Gokhale, noted that he had spurned some rituals at his coronation, and alleged he sympathised with the Akalis. They also erroneously claimed that Bhupinder Singh opposed the abdication, which he was quick to deny.

Bhupinder Singh's decision to side with the British and instigate a counterpropaganda campaign at their request drove a wedge between Punjabi Sikhs. Patiala was considered to be the most important of the Sikh states and its prime minister, Daya Kishan Kaul, attempted to mobilise its supporters among the SGPC as well as those citizens of Nabha who had been ill-treated by Ripudaman. He also attempted to feed the press with stories in support of both his state and the British.

== Gallery ==
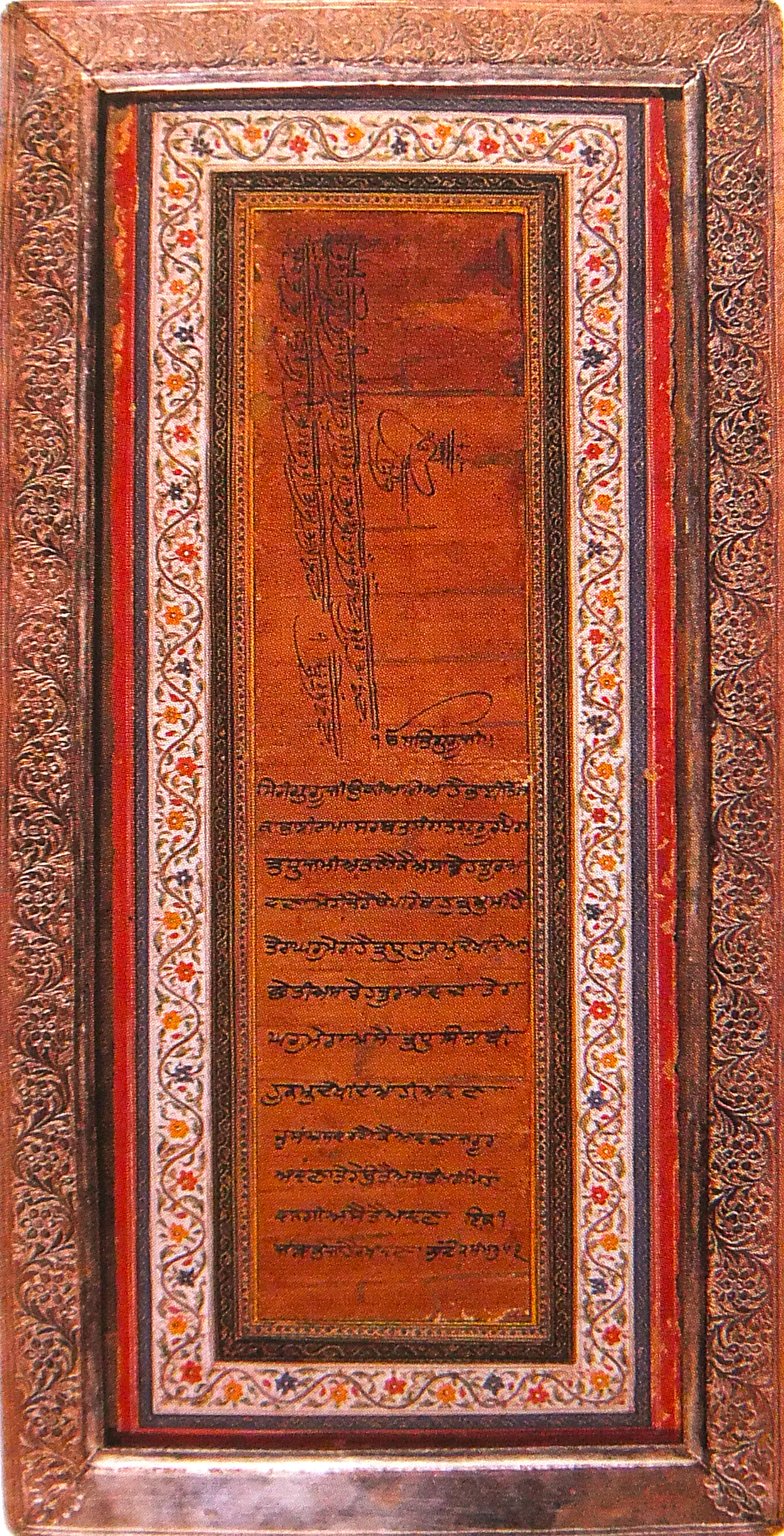
Guru Gobind Singh's hukamnama addressed to Rama and Tiloka, sons of Phul Singh. Dated August 2 1696, from the Maharaja of Patiala's collection.

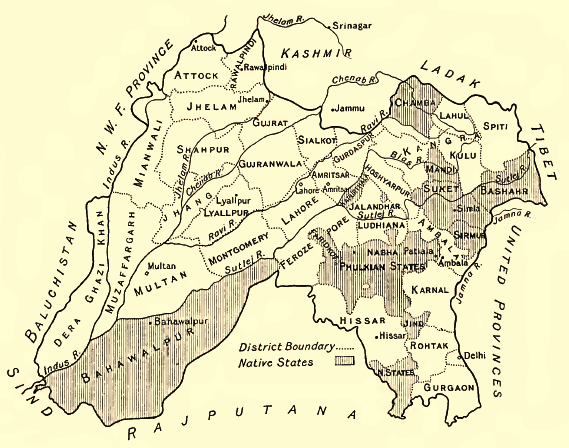
Phulkian states in a 1911 map of Punjab

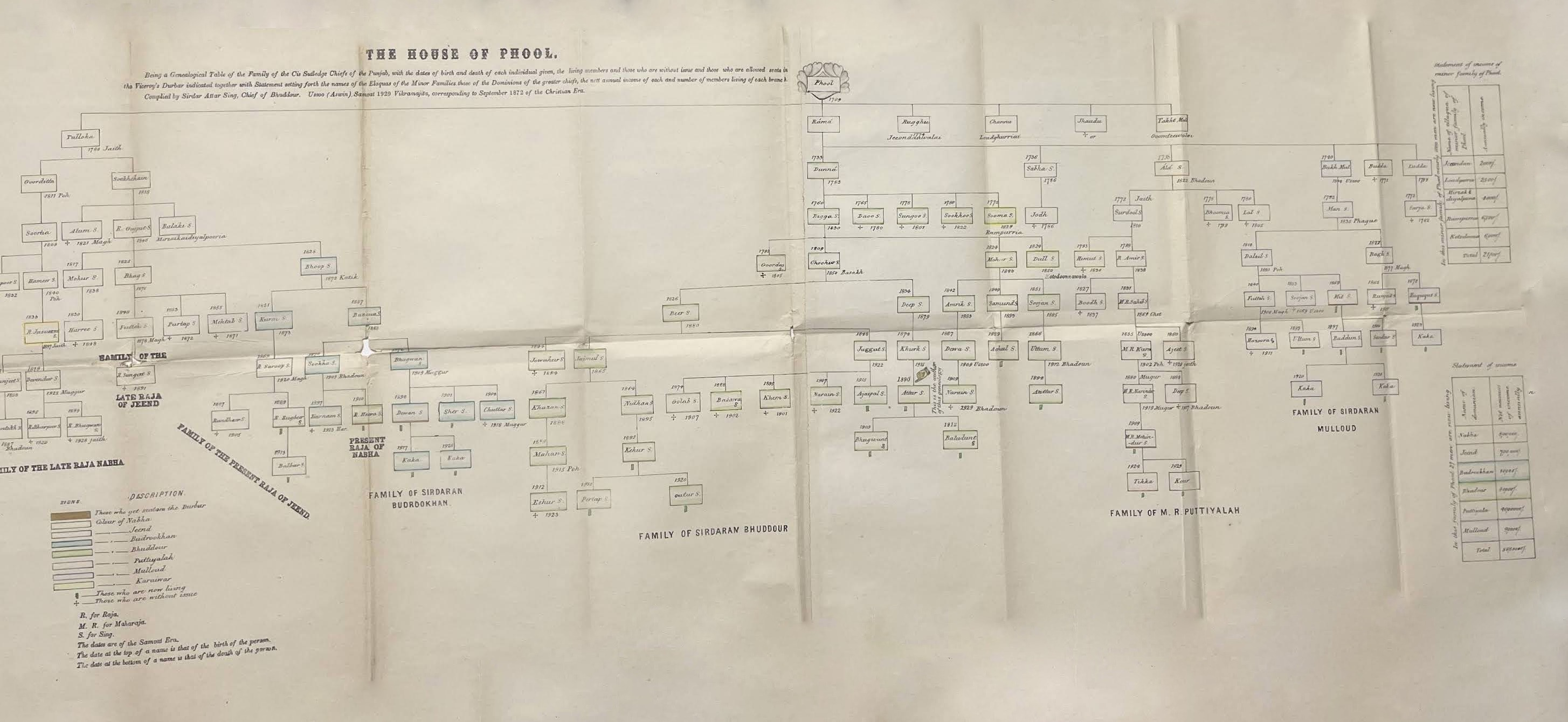
Genealogical table of the Phulkian Dynasty, including the houses of Patiala, Jind, Nabha, Bhadaur, Malaudh, and Badrukhan, created by Sardar Attar Singh of Bhadaur, September 1872. The years are according to the Bikrami dates.

== See also ==
- List of Jat dynasties and states
- Phulkian States
- Patiala State
- Nabha State
- Jind State
- Faridkot State
- Malaudh
- Bhadaur
- Kaithal
- Cis-Sutlej states
