= Rajkiya Pratibha Vikas Vidyalaya =

State government-run school system in Delhi, India

Rajkiya Pratibha Vikas Vidyalayas and DBRA Schools of Specialized Excellence and CM SHRI Schools

Information
- School type: Government school system, day school
- Founded: 1997; 29 years ago (as RPVV); 2021; 5 years ago (as DBRA-SOSE) 2025; 1 year ago (as CM SHRI)
- Founder: Directorate of Education, Government of National Capital Territory of Delhi
- Headmaster: Head of School (Principal)
- Grades: 6 to 12 (as RPVV); 9 to 12 (as DBRA-SOSE); 6 to 12 (as CM SHRI)
- Gender: Co-Ed.
- Age: 10 to 19
- Enrollment: c. 500-700 in each school
- Affiliation: Central Board of Secondary Education (as RPVV); Delhi Board of School Education (as DBRA-SOSE); Central Board of Secondary Education (as CM SHRI)
- Website: www.edudel.nic.in

Rajkiya Pratibha Vikas Vidyalayas, popularly known as RPVV or Pratibha, and reestablished as Dr. Bhim Rao Ambedkar Schools of Specialized Excellence (DBRA-SOSE), and eventually as CM SHRI Schools, alongside other schools of DoE, is a school system run by the Directorate of Education, Government of Delhi in Delhi, India. The member schools are in Raj Niwas Marg, Surajmal Vihar, Civil Lines, Yamuna Vihar, Kishanganj, Lajpat Nagar, Shalimar Bagh, Hari Nagar, Rohini, Paschim Vihar, Vasant Kunj, Lodi Road, Link Road, Dwarka in sector 5, 10 and 19, Gandhi Nagar, Rohini Sector 11, Gautampuri, INA Colony, IP Extension, Jahangirpuri, Narela and Nand Nagri.

== Admission ==
=== For RPVVs ===
An entrance test is conducted every year. This is the only gateway for admission in the RPVVs. Admission of students is in 6th,9th and 11th standards. Due to the COVID-19 pandemic, no entrance test was held for the 2020–21 school year. Class 11th admissions are held on the merit base of CBSE results of standard 10th.

Due to establishment of the DBRA-SOSEs in 2021, no new admissions are being accepted in RPVVs now and eventually the existence of RPVVs will come to an end in at most three years.

=== For DBRA-SOSEs ===
For admission in DBRA-SOSEs, students need to appear in the entrance test in standard 9th and 11th in interested specialisations.

As of 2026, no new admissions are being accepted in SoSEs due to establishment of CM SHRI. Students under SoSE in class 10 (of session 2025-26) will be transferred to CM SHRI in 11th, and 11th class students will continue as SoSE in 12th as the last batch. SoSEs will come to an end in the next academic year.

=== For CM SHRIs ===
For admission in CM SHRIs, students need to appear in the entrance test in standard 6th and 9th based on general syllabus & in 11th based on stream preference.

== Affiliation ==
RPVVs are affiliated with the Central Board of Secondary Education and Directorate of Education, Government of NCT of Delhi.

DBRA-SOSEs are affiliated with the newly formed Delhi Board of School Education and directorate of education, Government of NCT of Delhi.

CM SHRIs are affiliated with the Central Board of Secondary Education and Directorate of Education, Government of NCT of Delhi

== RPVV/SoSE/CM Shri schools in Delhi ==
- RPVV/SoSE/CM Shri, Gautampuri New Usmanpur
- RPVV/SoSE/CM Shri, Raj Niwas Marg (Ludlow castle no-1)
- RPVV/SoSE/CM Shri, Dwarka Sector 10
- RPVV/SoSE/CM Shri, Civil Lines (Ludlow castle no-3)
- RPVV/SoSE/CM Shri, Dwarka Sector 5
- RPVV/SoSE/CM Shri, Gandhi Nagar
- RPVV/SoSE/CM Shri, B- Block, Hari Nagar (Maya Puri Road)
- RPVV/SoSE/CM Shri, Nai Basti, Kishan Ganj
- RPVV/SoSE/CM Shri, Krishna Market, Lajpat Nagar
- RPVV/SoSE/CM Shri, INA Colony, C- Block, Defence Colony
- RPVV/SoSE/CM Shri, Plot No. 1, Link Road, Karol Bagh
- RPVV/SoSE/CM Shri, D-1, Nand Nagari
- RPVV/SoSE/CM Shri, A-10, Pocket-5, Narela
- RPVV/SoSE/CM Shri, A-6, Paschim Vihar
- RPVV/SoSE/CM Shri, Sector-11, Rohini
- RPVV/SoSE/CM Shri, B- Block, Shalimar Bagh
- RPVV/SoSE/CM Shri, A- Block, Jahangir Puri
- RPVV/SoSE/CM Shri, Surajmal Vihar
- RPVV/SoSE/CM Shri, B-1 Vasant Kunj
- RPVV/SoSE/CM Shri, B-Block, Yamuna Vihar
- RPVV/SoSE/CM Shri, Dwarka, Sector-19, Delhi-75
- RPVV/SoSE/CM Shri, Rohini, Sector-21
- RPVV/SoSE/CM Shri, I.P. Extension, near Maayo College

== Achievements ==
- 2023: SoSE Rohini Sector 11 won the 'Delhi Robotics League', a premier robotics competition organized by IIT Delhi. Notably, students of SoSE Rohini Sector 17 have authored over 170+ books.
- 2018: RPVV Dwarka Sector 10 secured the first rank among government schools across India in the Education World rankings.
- 2018: Prince Kumar, a student of RPVV Dwarka Sector 10, scored 496 out of 500 marks in the Class XII board examinations and topped the Science stream in New Delhi.
- 2016: In the CBSE Class XII results, Kirti Dua from RPVV Civil Lines topped the Delhi state government schools across all streams by securing 97% in the Science stream.
- 2014: The RPVV Dwarka, Sector-11 Rohini, and Shalimar Bagh were ranked 3rd, 4th, and 6th respectively in an All-India survey conducted by Education World.
- 2013: In the CBSE Class XII results,[5] a student named Ankit Saini from RPVV Dwarka secured the top position among students in Delhi government schools with a score of 97.4%.
- 2012: In the CBSE Class XII results, Sonali Goyal from RPVV Shalimar Bagh topped the students of Delhi government schools across all streams with 96.8% marks.
- 2009 (October): A team of teachers from the United Kingdom visited Delhi schools, including RPVVs, as part of a British Council program to study educational practices abroad.
- 2003: RPVV Paschim Vihar won the National Computer Literacy Excellence Award.

More than 170 books have been written by students of SoSE Rohini Sector 17.
