= Indian Board of School Education =

- Abbreviation: IBOSE
- Formation: November 29, 2008 (17 years ago)
- Type: Private Board of School Education
- Headquarters: Bengal, WB, India
- Location: Bengal
- Official language: Bengali, Hindi & English
- Chairman: Mr. B Sarkar
- Website: www.ibose.in

The Indian Board of School Education (IBOSE), is the Board of Education for private education, under the Government of India. It was established by the S.R. Acts XXI of 1860 of the Government of India in 2007 to provide education inexpensively to remote areas. The IBOSE is a national board that administers examinations for Secondary and Senior Secondary examinations of schools.

It had an enrolment of about thousands students from 2008 to 2015 at secondary and senior secondary levels and enrols about one thousand students annually which makes it the largest private schooling system in the India.

The Indian Board of School Education have regional information centres or study centres all over India.

== Courses ==
The Indian Board of School Education offer the following courses:

- Secondary Course—Equivalent to class X (10TH)
- Senior Secondary Course—Equivalent to class XII (12th)

== Examinations ==
The public examinations are held annually in the months of March–April on dates fixed by the Indian Board of School Education.

== See also ==
- Central Board of Secondary Education (CBSE), India
- BOSSE - Board of Open Schooling and Skill Education, Sikkim
- Council for the Indian School Certificate Examinations (CISCE), India ( ICSE and ISC examinations are conducted by CISCE )
- National Institute of Open Schooling (NIOS)
- Indian School Certificate (ISC), India
- Indian Certificate of Secondary Education (ICSE), India
- Secondary School Leaving Certificate (SSLC)
- West Bengal Board of Secondary Education (WBBSE), India
- Maharashtra State Board of Secondary and Higher Secondary Education (महाराष्ट्र राज्य माध्यमिक व उच्च माध्यमिक शिक्षण मंडळ) (MSBSHSE), India
- All India Institute of Open Schooling Board, Delhi (AIIOS), India
