= Samuel Ludlow =

Samuel Ludlow may refer to:

- Samuel Ludlow (judge) (1792–1882), American judge
- Samuel Ludlow (surgeon), British surgeon in India, namesake of Ludlow Castle, Delhi
