= Ludlow Castle, Delhi =

Building in Delhi, India

1909 map showing the location of Ludlow Castle (underlined in red) north of the walled city of Shahajahanabad (Old Delhi).

Ludlow Castle, Delhi was a building located in the Civil Lines in Delhi, India, which for a time during East India Company rule in the first half of the 19th century served as the Residency of the British political agent to the Mughal Court; later it was the headquarters of the Commissioner of the Delhi Territory within the North-Western Provinces.

Until 1831, Ludlow Castle had been the home of Samuel Ludlow, the Residency Surgeon. The building then became the Residency, and was the site of a battery employed by British troops during the Indian rebellion of 1857 to successfully breach the Kashmiri Gate bastion and thereafter to retake the city. After 1857—in the first few decades of the British Raj—Ludlow Castle remained the home of the Chief Commissioner; Delhi Territory, however, had become a part of the Punjab Province. Among the building's many guests during this period was the former US President Ulysses S. Grant.

During the late 19th century and much of the first half of the 20th, the building housed the Delhi Club. Staying there in 1916 was the wedding party of Jawaharlal Nehru. After India's independence in 1947, the Ludlow Castle building was turned into a high school. The building was demolished in the 1960s to make room for the expansion of the school, now the Government Model Senior Secondary School. The neighbourhood and the transit stop in Delhi, however, continue to be known as "Ludlow Castle."

== Home and Delhi Residency ==
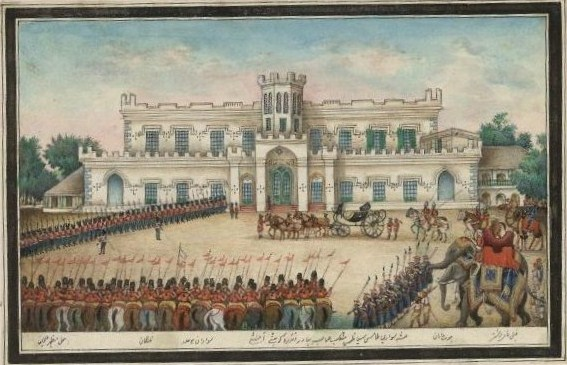
Ink and colours sketch made more than a decade after Samuel Ludlow and his family had left Delhi showing Ludlow Castle being used as the Delhi Residency, with waiting carriage, camels, elephants, and Skinner's Horse.

Samuel Ludlow had the house constructed sometime after he moved to Delhi in 1813, its name, "Ludlow Castle," a play on words on his surname, the building's turret, its decorative crenelations, and the 11th-century Ludlow Castle, Shropshire. During his time in Delhi, Ludlow was promoted from Assistant Surgeon in the East India Company, Bengal Presidency medical establishment, to full Surgeon in 1817, and to Presidency Surgeon. In 1831, he was promoted to Superintending Surgeon and transferred out of Delhi.

From 1832 to 1857, Ludlow Castle was the home of the British Resident to the Mughal Court in Delhi. Among the Residents who lived in Ludlow Castle were William Fraser (1832–1835), Sir Thomas Theophilus Metcalfe (1835–1853) and Simon Fraser (1853–1857).

== Siege of Delhi ==
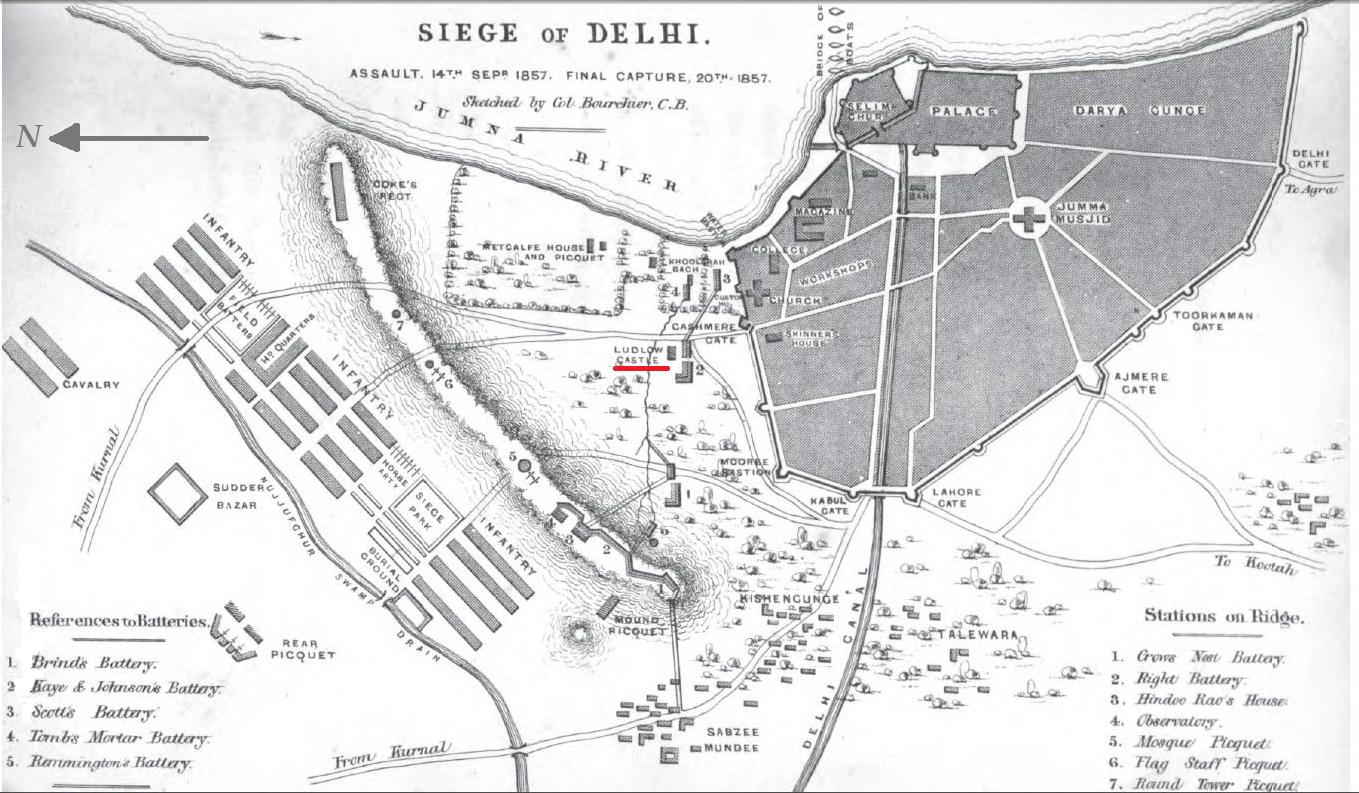
A map of the Siege of Delhi, 1857, showing the location of battery number 2 at Ludlow Castle.

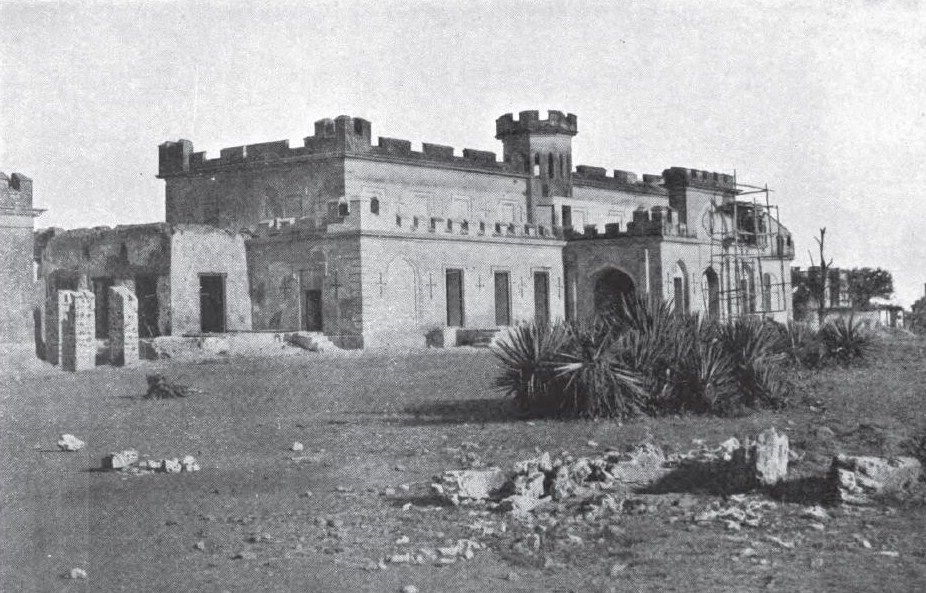
Ludlow Castle, which had been damaged during the Indian rebellion of 1857, being repaired after the British retook Delhi in September 1857.

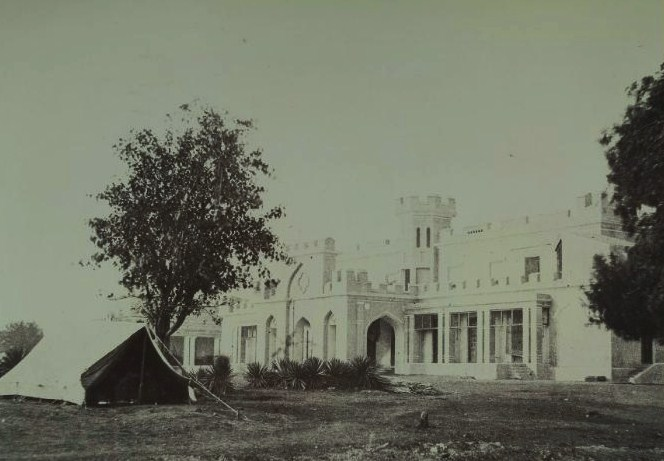
Photograph of Ludlow Castle taken in 1858 by Robert and Harriet Tytler showing some more repairs undertaken.

The siege train, consisting of fifteen 24-pounder guns, twenty 18-pounder guns and twenty-five heavy mortars and howitzers, with almost 600 ammunition carts, arrived on 6 September. Wilson's chief Engineer Officer, Richard Baird Smith, had drawn up a plan to breach the city walls and make an assault.

As a preliminary step, on 6 September the British constructed "Reid's Battery", or the "Sammy House Battery", of two 24-pounder and four 9-pounder guns, near the southern end of the ridge, to silence the guns on the Mori Bastion. Under cover of Reid's Battery, on 7 September the first siege battery proper was established, 700 yards (640 m) from the Mori Bastion. Four of its guns engaged the artillery on the Kashmir Bastion, while six guns and a heavy mortar demolished the Mori Bastion. After a long duel, it silenced the rebels' guns on the Mori Bastion. The direction of this attack also deceived the rebels that the storming attempt would be made from the east, rather than the north.

A second battery, consisting of nine 24-pounder guns, two 18-pounder guns and seven 8-inch mortars, was set up near Ludlow Castle and opened fire against the Kashmir Bastion on 11 September. A third battery of six 18-pounder guns was set up near the old Custom House less than 200 yards (180 m) from the city walls, and opened fire against the Water Bastion near the Yamuna next day. A fourth battery of ten heavy mortars was set up in cover near the Khudsia Bagh. Because the element of surprise had been lost, the Indian sappers and pioneers who carried out much of the work of constructing the second and third batteries and moving the guns into position suffered heavy casualties (over 300), but the batteries quickly made breaches in the bastions and walls.

The opening of this phase of the siege seems to have coincided with the exhaustion of the ammunition the rebels had captured from the magazine, as the rebel fire became suddenly much less effective. By this time also, the rebels had become depressed through lack of supplies and money, and by defeatist rumours which were spread by agents and spies organised by William Hodson.

== After the rebellion ==
A later 1858 photograph (taken by Felice Beato) shows the repairs completed.

Photograph from Christmas 1878 showing Delhi Commissioner G. Gordon Young and his wife sitting in their carriage in the driveway of Ludlow Castle. A little over a month later they would host former U.S. president Ulysses S. Grant there.

For many years in the second half of the 19th century, Ludlow Castle was the home of the Commissioner of Delhi, who often hosted visiting dignitaries there. From 5 to 9 February 1870, Prince Alfred, the second son of Queen Victoria and the then Duke of Edinburgh, was the guest of the Commissioner of Delhi, Col. McNeile, in Ludlow Castle. After arriving in Delhi in the late afternoon, and after an early dinner, the prince was taken on a tour of Old Delhi. Accompanying surgeon Joseph Fayrer recorded the evening enthusiastically:

The Duke was in the howdah with Colonel McNeile. ... The road to the Lahore Gate was beautifully illuminated with coloured lamps hanging from the trees; the effect was excellent, and free from the formality of continuous lines of light. There were triumphal arches in the Chandney Chowk and Dureeba, and up to the front of the steps of the Jumma Musjid was one continuous blaze of Bengal lights and other forms of illumination. The streets, and every house-top, window and balcony were crowded; numbers preceding the elephants, joining the European soldiers in loud hurrahs, made a most exciting scene. Dismounting at the foot of the Jumma Musjid, the Duke, with many ladies and gentlemen, witnessed a grand displayof fireworks from the platform of the mosque. They then returned to Ludlow Castle.

In February 1879, Ulysses S. Grant, on a tour of India, after two terms as US President, was a guest of the then commissioner of Delhi, G. Gordon Young, in Ludlow Castle. After being received at the Delhi Railway Station, Mr. and Mrs. Grant were driven to Ludlow Castle, while the rest of the party found lodgings in nearby hotels. For the next few days, Grant and party visited historic monuments in the city, including the Red Fort, the Qutub Minar and the Jama Masjid. Accompanying General Grant was the American journalist John Russell Young, whose experience of the Jama Masjid was more sober:

This mosque even now is one of the noblest buildings in India. It stands in the center of the city, built upon a rock. In the ancient time there were four streets that converged upon the mosque, leading into various parts of the town. But as the mosque was used during the mutiny as a fort, all the space in front of it has been cleared for military purposes, and the space between the mosque and the palace that was formerly densely peopled is now an open plain, where troops may maneuver and cannon may fire. Nothing is more important in the civilization of India by the English than that the cannon should have range.

== Twentieth century ==
A soccer goalpost formed the foreground of a photograph of Ludlow Castle, Delhi, taken on May 10, 1957. Some ten years earlier, after India's independence, the building had been converted to a school. The building was to be torn down in the 1960s to make room for the expansion of the school, now the Government Model Senior Secondary School.

According to Manmohini Zutshi Sahgal, in 1916, the wedding party of Jawaharlal Nehru, later the first prime minister of independent India, stayed at Ludlow Castle (then the Delhi Club) during their Delhi sojourn.

Ludlow Castle, Delhi, was demolished in the 1960s and in its place now stands the Government Model Senior Secondary School. The neighbourhood and transit stop in Delhi, however, continue to be known as "Ludlow Castle".

== See also ==
- Raj Niwas, Delhi, the later residence of the Chief Commissioner of Delhi and now the Lieutenant Governor of Delhi
