= Maharashtra State Board of Secondary and Higher Secondary Education =

Board of education in Maharashtra, India

- Seal of the Education Board of Maharashtra
- Abbreviation: MSBSHSE
- Formation: 1 January 1966; 60 years ago
- Type: State Governmental Board of Education
- Headquarters: Pune, Maharashtra
- Official language: Marathi
- Chairperson: Sharad Gosavi
- Secretary: Anuradha Oak
- Parent organization: Ministry of School Education, Government of Maharashtra
- Affiliations: 10,654 schools (2020)
- Website: mahahsscboard.in

The Maharashtra State Board of Secondary and Higher Secondary Education (Abbreviation: MSBSHSE) is a statutory and autonomous body established under the "Maharashtra Secondary Boards Act" 1965 (amended in 1977). The board primarily conducts the class X SSC Board Examinations and class XII HSC Board Examinations in Maharashtra State. It is the most popular education board in terms of enrollment in high school in India only after the Central Board of Secondary Education.

== History ==
The Board came into existence on 1 January 1966 to regulate certain matters pertaining to secondary education in the state of Maharashtra, as "Maharashtra State Secondary Education Boards". The act was amended in 1976, and the name of the Board changed to its present name, "Maharashtra State Board of Secondary and Higher Secondary Education".

In 2020, the State Government announced that the Maharashtra International Education Board was to be merged with the State Board.

The board conducts exams in February and March of each year. It conducts other examinations such as CIS (Class Improvement Scheme) in July of the same.

== Functions ==
The board is responsible for formation, and implementation of the rules and regulations in accordance to the guidelines set by the state as well as central boards. It is also in charge, autonomously, of, and implementation of the syllabus/curriculum of all the grades, textbooks, exam schedule, and type. The board is also responsible for creation of textbooks, scoring of the centralised tests, and conducting examinations fairly and providing unbiased justice in the event of dispute.

The Board conducts examination twice a year and the number of students appearing for the main examination is around 1,400,000 for Higher Secondary Certificate (HSC) and 1,700,000 for Secondary School Certificate (SSC) every year.

The exams are usually held in the months of March, July, and October every year, and results are given out usually in June and January respectively. March marks the end of educational year, and June marks beginning of the new educational year in the state of Maharashtra.

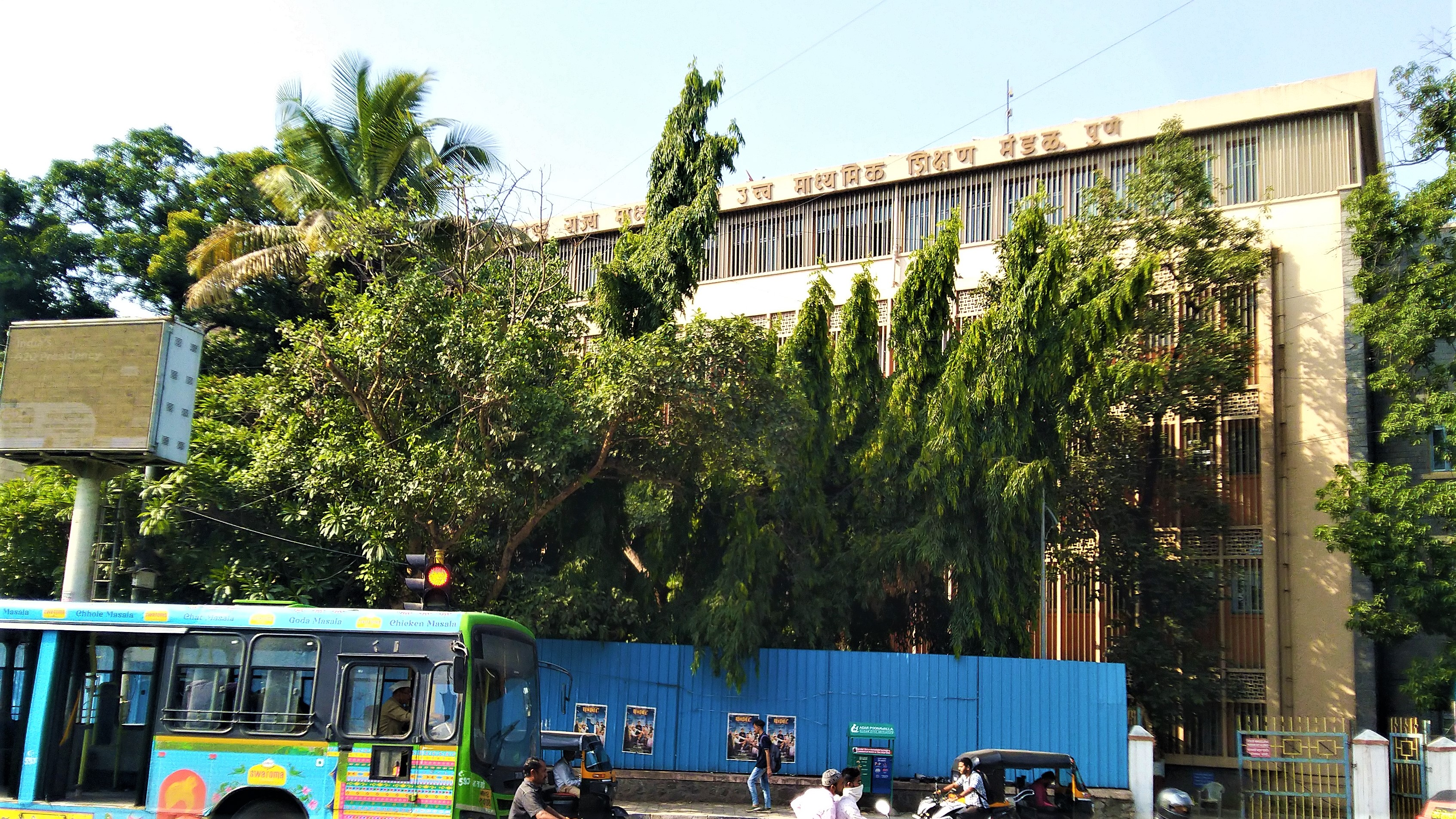
The headquarters of MSBSHSE in Pune

=== Divisional boards ===
There are nine divisional boards with the state to represent the state board. Their duties include, but not limited to:

- Decide the schools/colleges to conduct the final exams.
- Appoint the paper setters, translators, custodians (of question papers, and blank and filled up answer papers), conductors (transportation), and examiners (paper checkers).

There are nine divisional boards located at Amravati, Chhatrapati Sambhaji Nagar, Kolhapur, Konkan, Latur, Mumbai, Nagpur, Nashik, and Pune.

== Controversy ==
The board is associated with various controversies. In 2026, the HSC Board Examination Paper for Chemistry, Mathematics and Physics were circulated a few minutes before the exams begun (11:00 hours). Nagpur Police arrested 2 individuals in this case. Similar Incidents were recorded in 2023 (HSC Maths Paper Leak) and 2017.

The board is frequently criticised for its focus on rote-learning and neglect towards modern academic standards. It also faced criticism for absurd alignment of chapters which are totally different from national standards and NEP, disadvantaging students in competitive exams. It also faces criticism for its checking styles, which focus on penalization if rote patterns are not followed.

The board has a very large number of dummy junior colleges operating under 'integrated' patterns for competitive exam preparation, and the 75% attendance rule in such institutions is hardly enforced. While certain colleges enforce the 75% rule rigorously, the board is lax in other cases.

The board also faces criticism for its bureaucratic incompetence and frequent harassment to pupils and their parents for various processes. Many cases have emerged in which the board promised to return certain fees after re-evaluation in examinations, however, no such return of fees was received by parents or pupils.

== See also ==
- Central Board of Secondary Education (CBSE)
- Council for the Indian School Certificate Examinations (CISCE)
- National Institute of Open Schooling (NIOS)
- Secondary School Leaving Certificate (SSLC)
- State Board of School Examinations (Sec.) & Board of Higher Secondary Examinations, Tamil Nadu (SBSEBHSE)
- Uttarakhand Board of School Education (UBSE)
- West Bengal Board of Primary Education (WBBPE), West Bengal Board of Secondary Education (WBBSE), West Bengal Council of Higher Secondary Education (WBCHSE), West Bengal Board of Madrasah Education (WBBME)
- Delhi Board of School Education (DBSE)
- National Public School Group of Educational Institutions (NPS)
