= Samuel Ludlow (surgeon) =

British surgeon

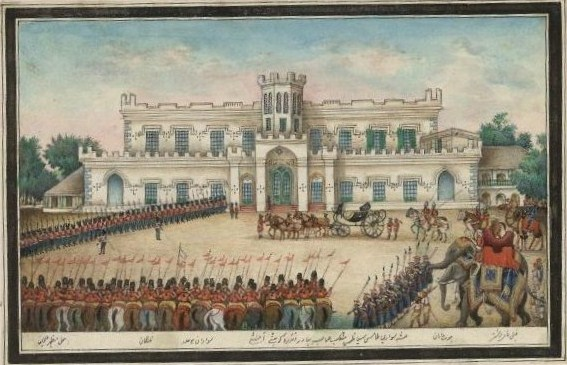
Ink and colours sketch made more than a decade after Samuel Ludlow and his family had left Delhi showing Ludlow Castle being used as the Delhi Residency, with waiting carriage, camels, elephants, and Skinner's Horse.

Samuel Ludlow (died 1853) was a British surgeon in the East India Company medical establishment, serving in the Bengal Presidency in British India during the first half of the 19th century. Ludlow spent many years at the Delhi Residency, the headquarters of the British Resident to the Mughal Court in Delhi. The Resident's Office was created some time after 1803, when the British acquired Delhi, which soon became the Delhi Territory within the Ceded and Conquered Provinces, a part of the Bengal Presidency.

Ludlow joined the Bengal medical department (season of 1804) and was appointed Assistant Surgeon, First Class, on 18 March 1805. In March 1806 he became Assistant Surgeon to the civil station of Benaras. He was transferred to the Delhi Residency in 1813, and promoted to Surgeon on 30 January 1817. In 1828, at the time of the wedding of his daughter, he was Presidency Surgeon at Delhi. In 1831 he was appointed Superintending Surgeon and on 28 March of that year, transferred from Delhi to the Neemuch Division of the British Indian Army. On 7 December 1835 he was appointed Superintending Surgeon, Agra Circle. On 11 August 1838 he was transferred from the Agra circle to Superintending Surgeon, Sirhind Division, British Indian Army, based in Ambala. Ludlow was appointed to the Bengal Medical Board and eventually retired from East India Company service and settled in Exeter. In 1844, he was elected Fellow of the Royal College of Surgeons (Hon.), one of the original 300. Sometime later, Samuel Ludlow moved to Bath, where he died on 17 October 1853 after a protracted illness. His widow, Mary Ludlow, died in Cheltenham on 26 July 1870, aged 93.

Ludlow is best known today for having constructed a house in the Civil Lines, just outside the city walls of Old Delhi, which was christened "Ludlow Castle," a play on words on his surname, the building's turret, its decorative crenelations, and the 11th-century Ludlow Castle, Shropshire. Ludlow Castle, Delhi, was later to become the Residency at Delhi, and, still later, in September 1857, be the site of a battery used by British troops in the Siege of Delhi to breach the city wall and retake the city.

== See also ==
- Indian rebellion of 1857
