= Maharashtra International Education Board =

Education board in India

- Type: State Governmental Board of Education
- Headquarters: Pune, Maharashtra
- Official language: Marathi

The Maharashtra International Education Board (MIEB) was an autonomous Board established by the State Education department of the Government of Maharashtra in 2018, that aimed to run Schools across the state, providing high quality Education in Marathi equivalent to International Standards for children in Public Schools. MIEB was the second board in the state after the Maharashtra State Board of Secondary and Higher Secondary Education. The Board was to prepare a syllabus for non-English medium schools, and to compete with the existing boards such as CBSE and ICSE.

In 2020, the State Education Minister announced that the Board was to be merged with the Maharashtra State Board of Secondary and Higher Secondary Education.

== See also ==
- Maharashtra State Board of Secondary and Higher Secondary Education
