= Delhi Board of School Education =

Indian Educational board based in Delhi, India

Delhi Board of School Education (DBSE)
- Delhi Board of School Education
- Formation: 6 March 2021
- Founder: Government of Delhi
- Founded at: Delhi
- Type: Government Board of Education, Education board
- Legal status: State Level Board
- Headquarters: I.P. Extension, Patparganj, Delhi- 110092
- Location: Delhi, India
- Owner: Government of Delhi
- Director of Education: MS. VEDITHA REDDY, IAS
- Affiliations: AIU; COBSE; IB COBSE MoE, India
- Budget: ₹ 620 Million
- Website: https://www.dbseboard.org/

The Delhi Board of School Education (DBSE) was a state-level board of education of Delhi. It was established in 2021 by the directorate of education, Government of NCT of Delhi . Currently, there are 56 schools in Delhi called DBRA-SoSE (Dr. B.R. Ambedkar School of Specialized Excellence) formerly Rajkiya Pratibha Vikas Vidyalaya and other top performing schools (Like DMVS) that are affiliated to the DBSE. These schools that are affiliated to DBSE provide education in different fields. There are 21 schools for STEM, 17 schools for Humanities, 5 schools for "Performing & Visual Arts", 12 schools for "High End 21st Century Skills" and 1 school for Armed Forces training (Armed Forces Preparatory School).

== History ==
DBSE was approved by the cabinet of Delhi on 6 March 2021 and was officially registered on 19 March 2021. On 11 August 2021, International Baccalaureate signed an MoU with government of Delhi. On 13 August 2021, DBSE was recognised by COBSE (Council Of Boards of School Education) which allowed DBSE to conduct exams and grant certificates.
In 2025, the phasing out of DBSE was announced by the Education Department, with affiliated schools shifted back to CBSE.

== Affiliated Schools ==
• Dr. B.R. Ambedkar School of Specialized Excellence

== Memorandum of understanding (MoU)/Partnerships ==
- International Baccalaureate
- Indian Institute Of Technology Delhi (IIT Delhi)
- National Institute of Fashion technology Delhi (NIFT Delhi)
- Tata Institute Of Social Sciences
- Manipal Academy of Higher Education
- Lend-A-Hand India
- Vasant Valley School
- Ashoka University
- Global Music Institute
- Whistling Woods International
- CAMPK12
