= Lok Niwas, Delhi =

Residence of the Lt. Governor of Delhi

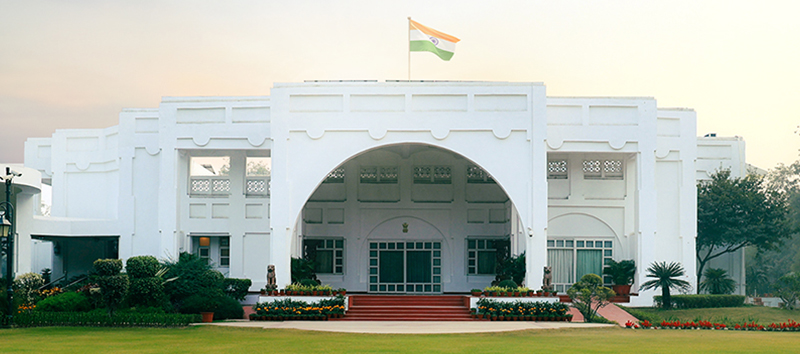
- The façade of Raj Niwas
- Interactive map of the Lok Niwas, Delhi area

General information
- Type: Government residence
- Coordinates: 28.6721°N 77.2206°E
- Current tenants: Taranjit Singh Sandhu
- Owner: Government of Delhi

Website
- https://lg.delhi.gov.in/lok-niwas

Lok Niwas formerly Raj Niwas (transl. Government House) is the official residence of the Lieutenant Governor of Delhi, who serves as the head of state for Delhi and the Government of the National Capital Territory of Delhi. It is located on Raj Niwas Marg in Civil Lines, Delhi. The incumbent lieutenant governor of Delhi is Taranjit Singh Sandhu, who has held office since 11 March 2026.

In 1911, when Delhi was proclaimed the new imperial capital of the British Raj, Raj Niwas was the residence of Chief Commissioner of Delhi.

== History ==
The area in which Raj Niwas stands has played an instrumental role in the administrative history of Delhi for over 175 years. Located just north of the 17th-century Mughal city of Shahjahanabad, it adjoins the Mughal garden known as Qudsia Bagh. After the British East India Company established their administrative control over Delhi in 1803, several palatial British mansions were gradually built in the locality.

In 1831, Ludlow Castle became the residence of the highest-ranking British official in Delhi, the Resident or Political Agent of the Governor-General of India to the Mughal court. After the 1857 Indian Rebellion was suppressed, it served as the residence of the Chief Commissioner of Delhi, appointed by the Viceroy of India.

In the decades after the Revolt of 1857, the Chief Commissioner of Delhi moved from Ludlow Castle to a smaller bungalow, now known as Raj Niwas. As more bungalows were constructed in the area, Civil Lines was developed. The road became known as Ludlow Castle Road, with Ludlow Castle itself being occupied in the late 19th century by the Delhi Club and later by a school.

== See also ==
- List of official residences of India
