= Delhi Territory =

Administrative region of British India

- Constituent territory of British India
- 1803–1832
- Flag

- Delhi Territory as part of North-Western Provinces & 1832 Map of the Indian Subcontinent, Highlighting Delhi Territory
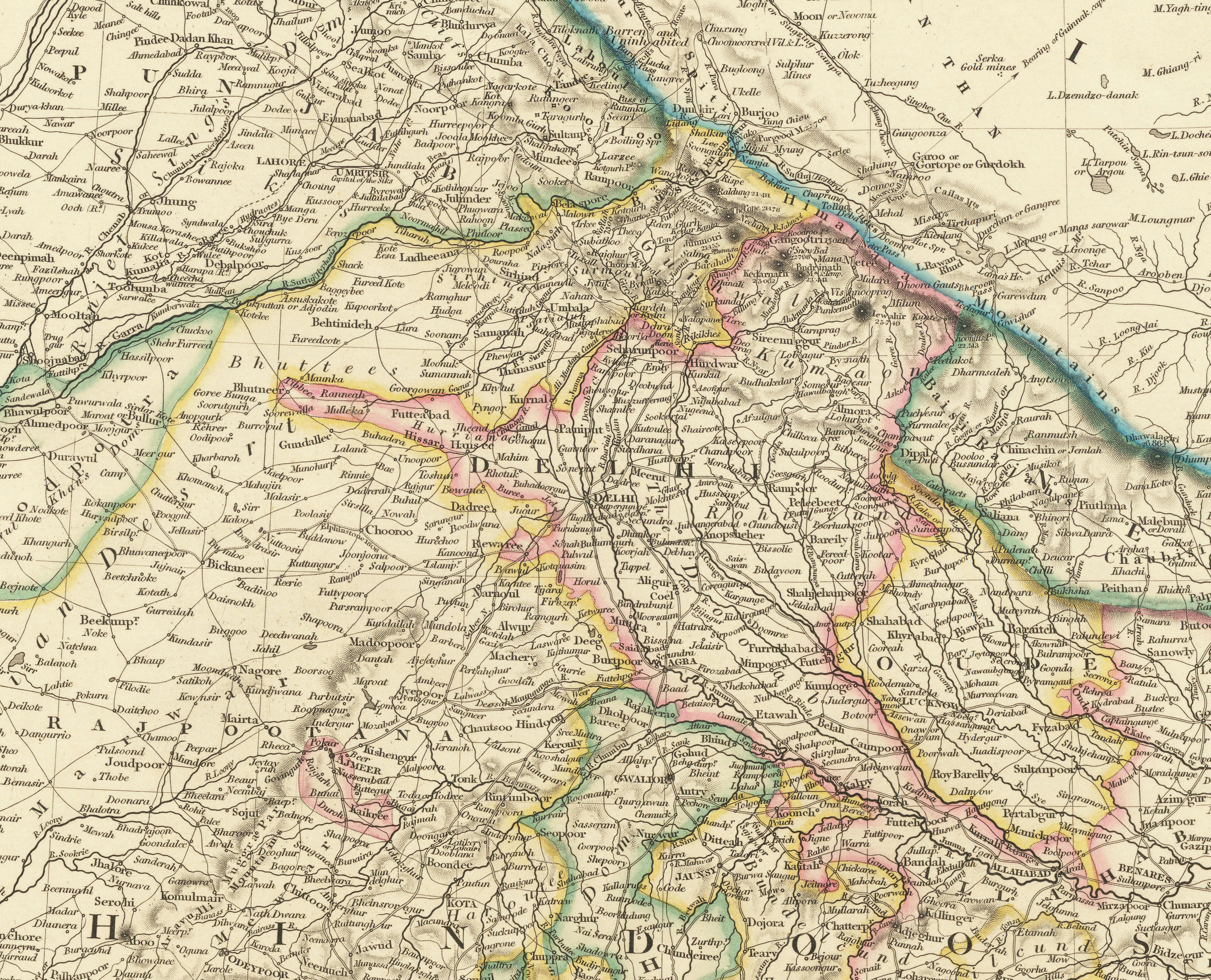
- Capital: Delhi
- History
  - Established: 1803
  - Disestablished: 1832
Preceded by	Succeeded by
Mughal Empire	Ceded and Conquered Provinces
- Today part of: Portions in Haryana; Delhi & few Portions in Punjab

The Delhi Territory was an administrative region of British India which comprised Delhi plus Gurgaon, Hissar, Sirsa, Karnal and Rohtak districts lying primarily to mostly the west of the Yamuna River—and later formed part of southern Punjab Province in 1858.

== History ==
Delhi was conquered by the British in 1803. On 30 December 1803, the Daulat Scindia signed the Treaty of Surji-Anjangaon with the British after the Battle of Assaye and Battle of Laswari and ceded to the British, Hisar, Panipat, Rohtak, Rewari, Gurgaon, Ganges-Jumna Doab, the Delhi-Agra region, parts of Bundelkhand, Broach, some districts of Gujarat and the fort of Ahmmadnagar.

Until 1832, the Delhi Division was controlled by the Residency. Regulation V of that year, abolished the office of Resident and annexed the Delhi territory to the jurisdiction of the Sadr Board and Courts of Justice at Allahabad, which included the Commissioner of the Delhi territory and all officers acting under his control, ordinarily to "or form to the principles and spirit of the regulations" in their his control, ordinarily to administration.

After the Indian rebellion of 1857, the Delhi Division of the North-Western Provinces was transferred to the Punjab in 1858, and formed into the Delhi and Hissar divisions, which embraced the six districts -

- Delhi Division: Delhi, Gurgaon, and Panipat
- Hisar Division: Hisar, Sirsa, Rohtak (and part of Jhajjar)

== Administration ==
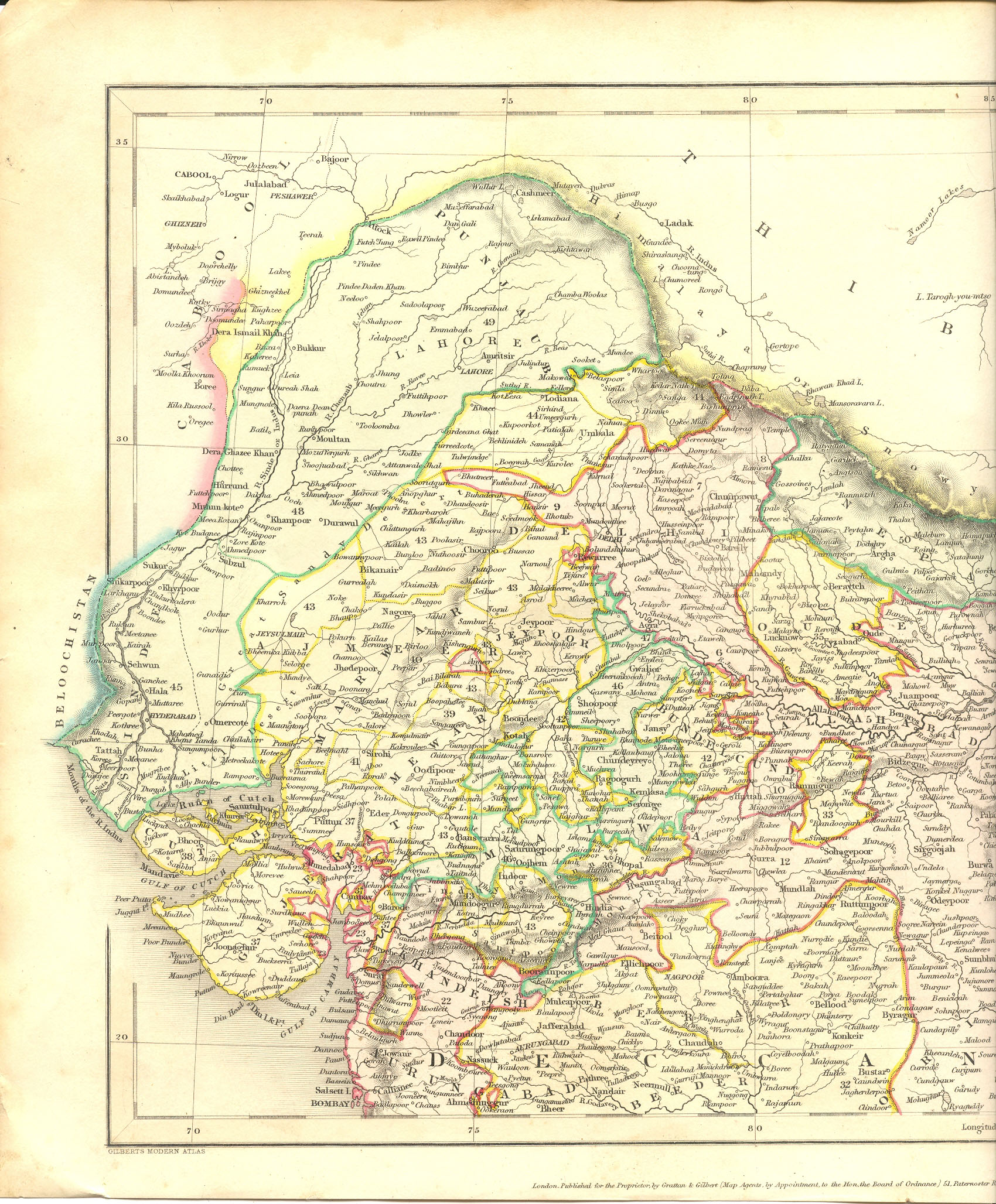
1840 Map of Delhi Region Side Indian Continent by John Archer.

The Delhi Territory underwent significant administrative transformation between 1803 and 1947 under British colonial rule. Following The Treaty of Surji-Anjangaon (1803) resulted in the Maratha chief Daulat Rao Sindhia ceding large portions of Haryana (then considered part of the Delhi Territory) to the British East India Company. These areas included Panipat, Sonipat, Samalkha, Ganaur, Haveli Palam (north), and Nuh, Hathin, Tizara, Bhora, Tapukara, Sohna, Rewari, Indri, and Palwal (south). Initially, the British directly governed select regions (termed "Assigned Territory"), while the rest remained under local chiefs' control subject to British suzerainty. In 1809, the Delhi Territory was administratively transferred to the Bengal Presidency and placed under the authority of the British Resident at Delhi. Land revenue systems were gradually implemented, beginning with William Fraser’s ten-year settlement in 1815, followed by a five-year settlement under Mr. Graham in 1825, and a ten-year settlement led by Mr. Brown in 1839–40, considered the first regular land revenue settlement.

A formal administrative structure was introduced in 1819 by C.T. Metcalfe, dividing the territory into three divisions:

1. Northern Division: Panipat, Sonipat, Rohtak, Hansi, and Hisar
2. Central Division: Delhi city and its environs
3. Southern Division: Palwal, Hodal, Mewat, Gurgaon, and Rewari

The territory’s designation changed from "Assigned Territory" to "Delhi Territory." The assistants to the commissioner served as Collectors and presided over civil, criminal, and revenue courts. Over time, administrative titles evolved, with commissioners redesignated as Deputy Superintendents in 1820, overseeing independent jurisdictions such as the Hisar-Hansi-Sirsa region.In 1833, the Charter Act led to the formation of the North-Western Provinces (headquartered at Agra), which included Delhi, Hisar, Rohtak, Gurgaon, and Panipat districts. These districts were subdivided into tehsils, zails, and villages, forming a complex administrative hierarchy.

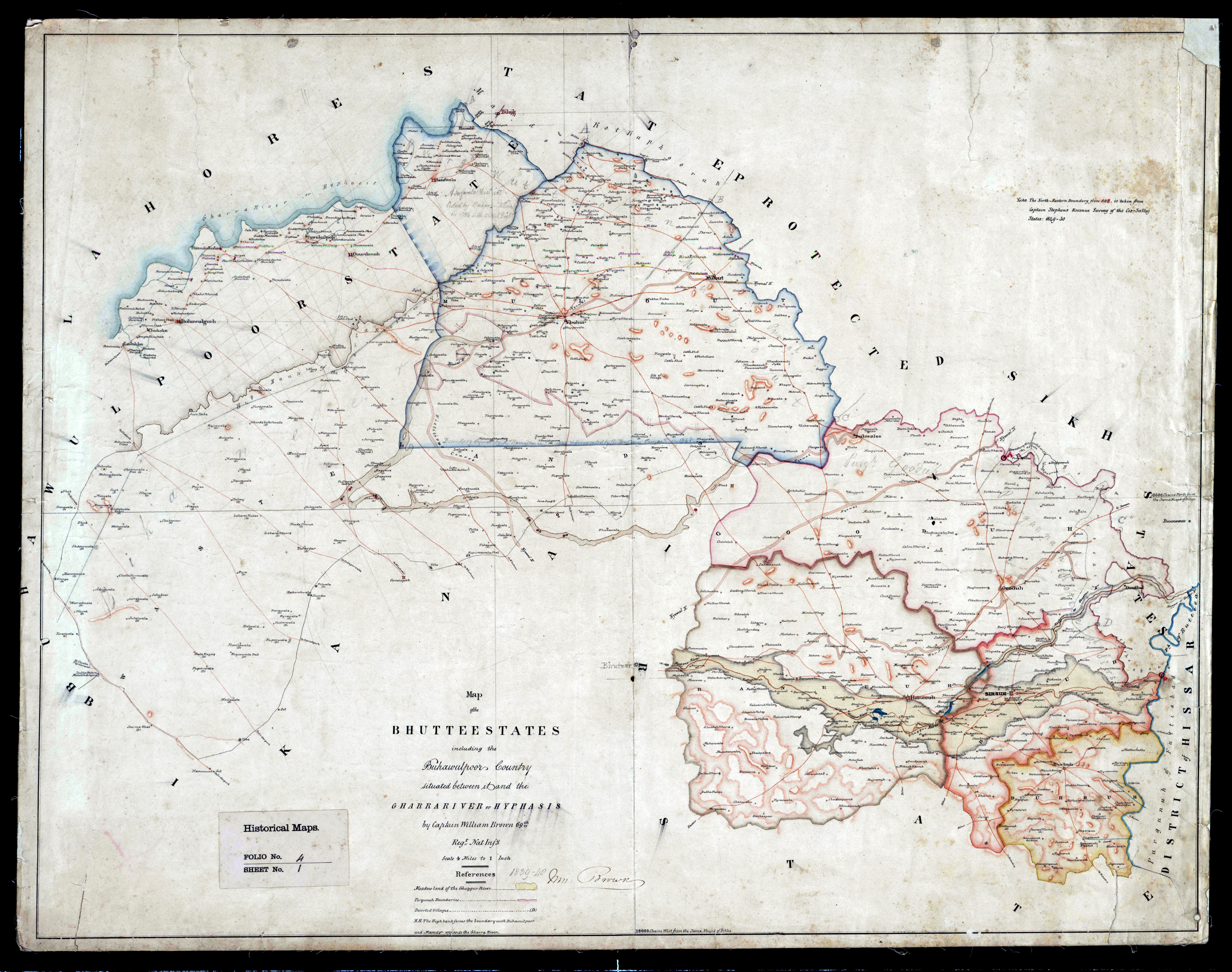
Map of the Bhatti States, including Bahawalpur State, surveyed by William Brown, 1839–40

In 1837, the parganas of Sirsa and Rania were separated from the Haryana (also known

as Hisar) district. Along with the Guda and Malaut parganas, they were made into a new district called Bhattiana (also known as Sirsa). Later, the Darba pargana from Hisar was added to Bhattiana in 1838, and the small Rori pargana, which was taken from the former Princely state of Nabha, was added in 1847. In 1844, the Wattu pargana, which stretched up to the Sutlej River, was also included in Bhattiana district.

In 1858, the entire Delhi territory, along with Bhattiana and Hisar districts, was transferred to Punjab. After this, Bhattiana district was renamed Sirsa. and formed into the Delhi and Hissar divisions, which embraced the six districts -

- Delhi Division: Delhi, Gurgaon, and Panipat
- Hisar Division: Hisar, Sirsa, Rohtak (and part of Jhajjar)

In 1861, 42 villages from the Tibi area of Rania pargana of Sirsa were given to the

Bikaner state. In 1884, the Sirsa district, which included the three tahsils of Sirsa, Dabwali, and Fazilka, was abolished. After that, Sirsa tahsil (with 199 villages) and 126 villages from Dabwali tahsil were combined to form a new tahsil. This new tahsil was added to Hisar district. The remaining area was given to Firozpur district in Punjab. No further changes happened in Sirsa until India became independent.

In 1884, the Hisar and Ambala Divisions were abolished, and their districts were reorganized. Most of their areas were merged into the Delhi Division, which then included the districts of "Delhi, Gurgaon, Karnal," "Hisar, Rohtak," "Ambala, and Simla," while Ludhiana district—previously part of the Ambala Division—was transferred to the Jullundur Division. Later, in 1911, Delhi district was separated from Punjab, and the headquarters of the Delhi Division were shifted to Ambala.

Ambala Division had originally been part of the Cis-Sutlej States under British control after the 1809 Treaty of Amritsar and joined Punjab Province in 1849.

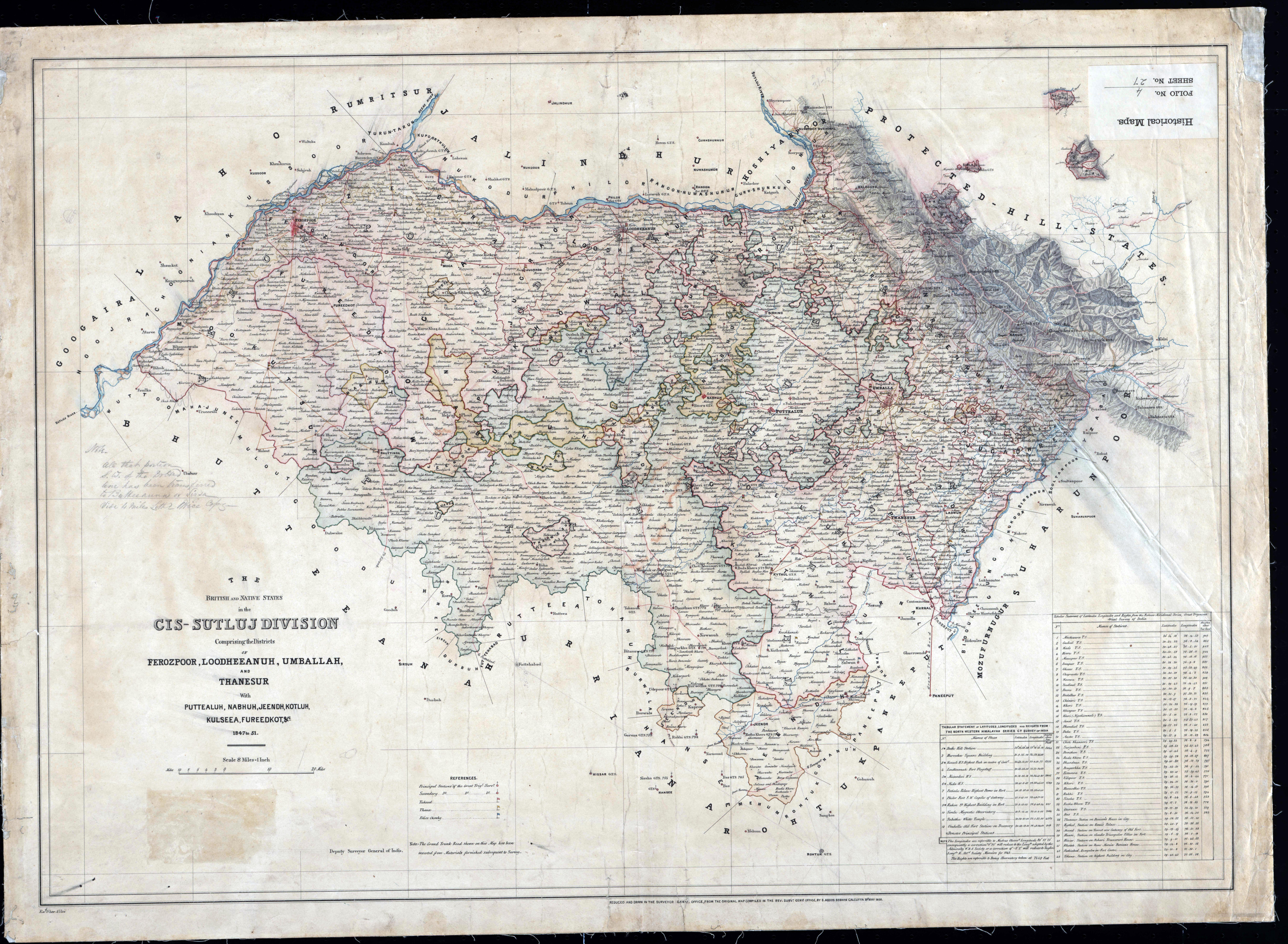
Cis-Sutlej States and Division (1847–1851), Punjab Province

The Ambala and Thanesar districts were both created from territories that had lapsed to the British Government during the period 1809 to 1846 from Cis-Sutlej States not Delhi Territory.The Ambala district was established in 1847. It originally included five tahsils and large jagir areas previously held by independent chiefs, whose sovereign powers were taken over by the British in 1846–47. Thanesar district was similarly formed from lapsed and forfeited lands, including estates such as Thanesar (partially lapsed in 1832 and fully by 1850), Kaithal (lapsed in 1843), and Ladwa (confiscated in 1846). Until 1849, these estates were managed by the Political Agent of Ambala and his assistants. After incorporation into Punjab in 1849 under a Deputy Commissioner subordinate to the Commissioner of the Cis-Sutlej Division.

In 1862, Thanesar district was abolished and its territory divided between Ambala and Karnal districts.

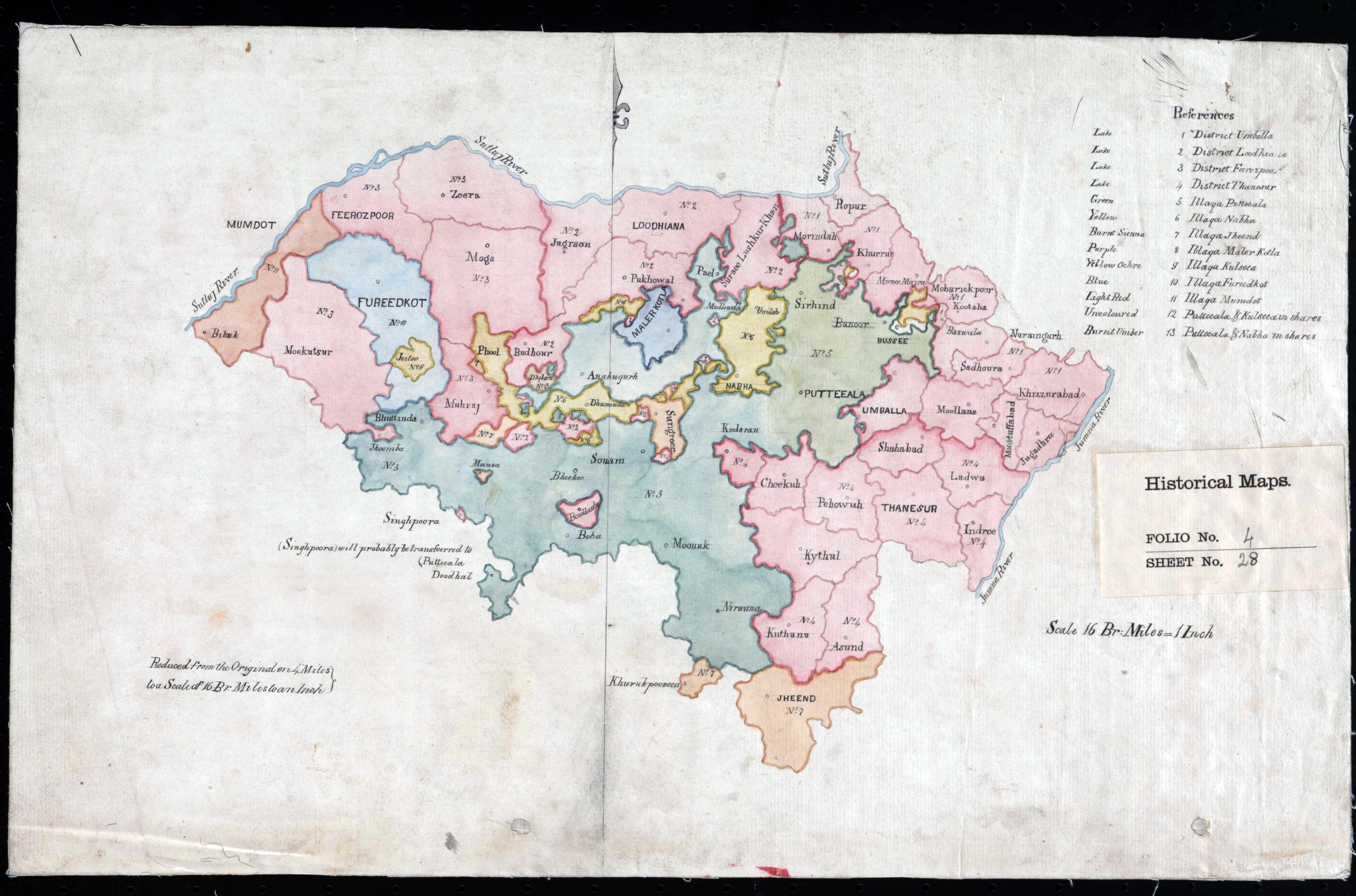
Map of the Cis-Sutlej territory (Ambala, Thanesar, Ludhiana, Firozpur), surveyed by H. V. Stephen, 1846–51

Shahabad, Ladwa, and part of Thanesar parganahs were added to Ambala district and formed new Pipli Tahsil or merged into it, while Kaithal and the remaining areas went to Karnal. The tahsils were reorganized accordingly. Previously, they were: 1. Kaithal; 2. Gula (which included the Pehowa tract, in 1923 part of Karnal); 3. Thanesar; and 4. Ladwa. The latter two included villages now in the Indri parganah of Karnal tahsil. In 1866, the Pehowa parganah was transferred from Karnal to Ambala. However, in 1876, 14 villages, and later in 1889, the remaining 89 villages, were transferred back from Pipli to the Kaithal tahsil of Karnal district.

According to the Ambala District Gazetteer of 1883, the district was divided into six tahsils. The tahsils of Pipli and Ambala included all the south-eastern portion of the district, while the tahsils of Jagadhri, Naraingarh, Kharar, and Rupnagar (Ropar) lay under the hills, arranged from east to west. Each tahsil was further subdivided into parganas. Ambala Tahsil comprised the parganas of Ambala and Mulana; Jagadhri Tahsil included Jagadhri, Mustafabad, and Khizrabad; Ropar Tahsil consisted of Ropar and Morinda; Kharar Tahsil contained Kharar and Mubarikpur; Naraingarh Tahsil included Naraingarh, Sadhaura, and Kutaha; while Pipli Tahsil was made up of Thanesar, Shahabad, and Ladwa. Each tahsil also had its corresponding thanas (police stations) and outposts. Ambala Tahsil had the thanas of Ambala City and Mulana. Kharar Tahsil included the thanas of Kharar, Chandigarh, and Mubarikpur, along with an outpost at Mani Majra. Ropar Tahsil had the thanas of Ropar and Morinda. Naraingarh Tahsil included the thanas of Naraingarh, Sadhaura, and Garhi, with second-class outposts at Morni and Patwi. Jagadhri Tahsil comprised the thanas of Jagadhri, Bilaspur, and Chhachhrauli. Pipli Tahsil included the thanas of Pipli, Shahabad, Thanesar, Pihova, Radaur, Sanghaur, and Ladwa, as well as a Baloch guard post at Ismailabad.

Significant lapses of jagir estates between the regular settlement and 1887 occurred due to failure of heirs: the Sialba estate lapsed in 1866, covering 63 villages, and the Manimajra estate lapsed in 1875, covering 69 villages. Since 1887, only the Parkhali jagir in tahsil Rupar has notably lapsed, with minor lapses occurring occasionally.

Finally, as noted in official records, Pipli tahsil of Ambala district was transferred to Karnal district in 1897, and the areas of Kalka-cum-Kurari, Kalka in 1899, and Sanawar in 1916 were added to Ambala district from Simla district.

Later, in 1911, Delhi district was separated from Punjab, and the headquarters of the Delhi Division were shifted to Ambala.

Following the decision to shift the Imperial Capital of British India from Calcutta to Delhi in 1911, the Delhi District was significantly reorganized. Prior to this, Delhi District comprised three tahsils: Sonepat, Ballabgarh, and Delhi.

As a result of the reorganization:

- Sonepat Tahsil was transferred to Rohtak District.
- A portion of 280 square miles of Ballabgarh Tahsil was transferred to Gurgaon District.
- The remaining 101 square miles of Ballabgarh Tahsil, along with Delhi Tahsil, covering a total area of 547 square miles, was constituted into a new administrative unit. This newly defined territory was designated as the Province of Delhi. Later, Between 1911 and 1921, an additional area of 43 square miles from the Meerut district (Ghaziabad Tahsil) of the United Provinces was also added to it.

== Gallery ==
1832 Indian Side Including Delhi Territory

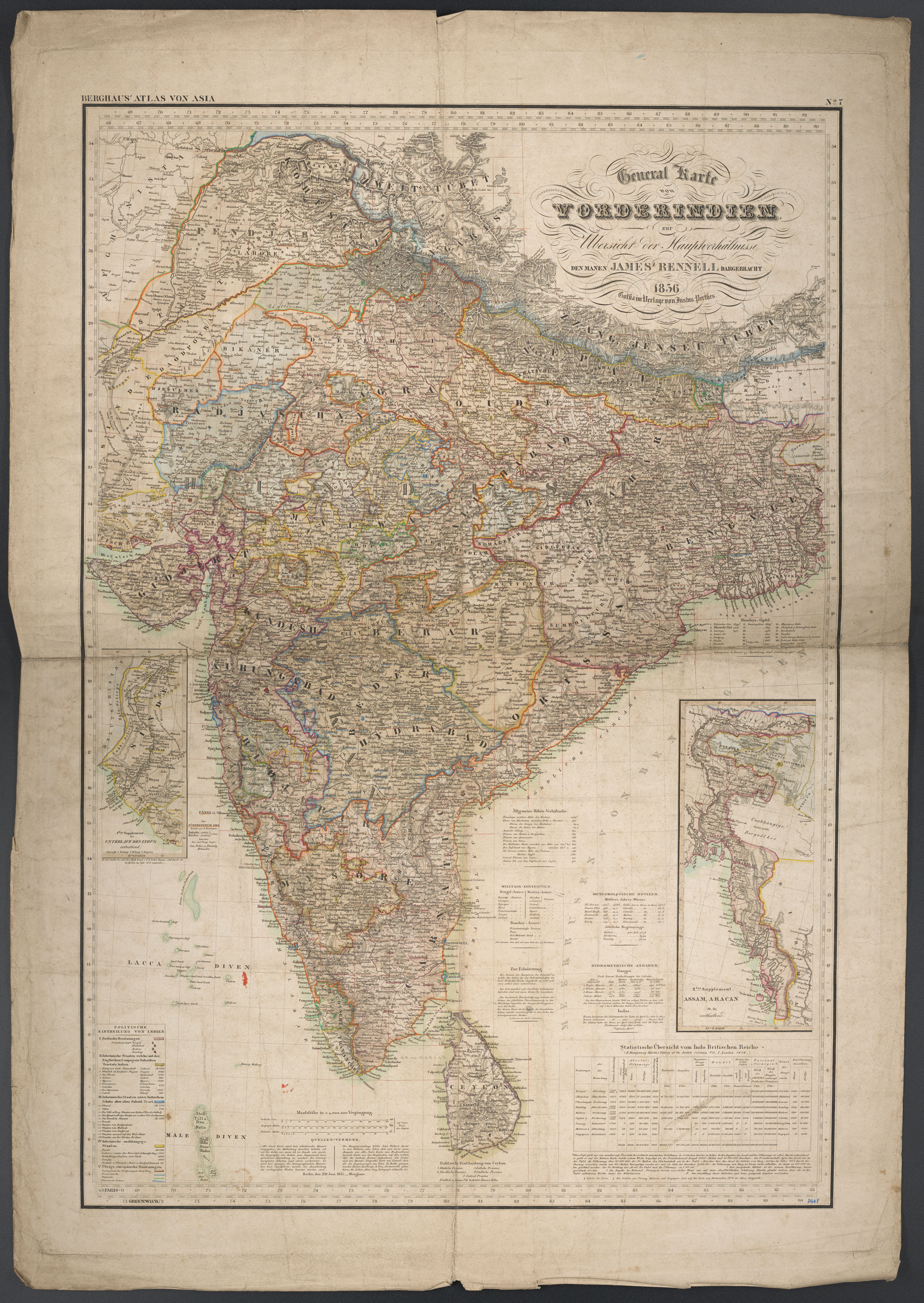
1836 Indian Continent with Delhi Territory

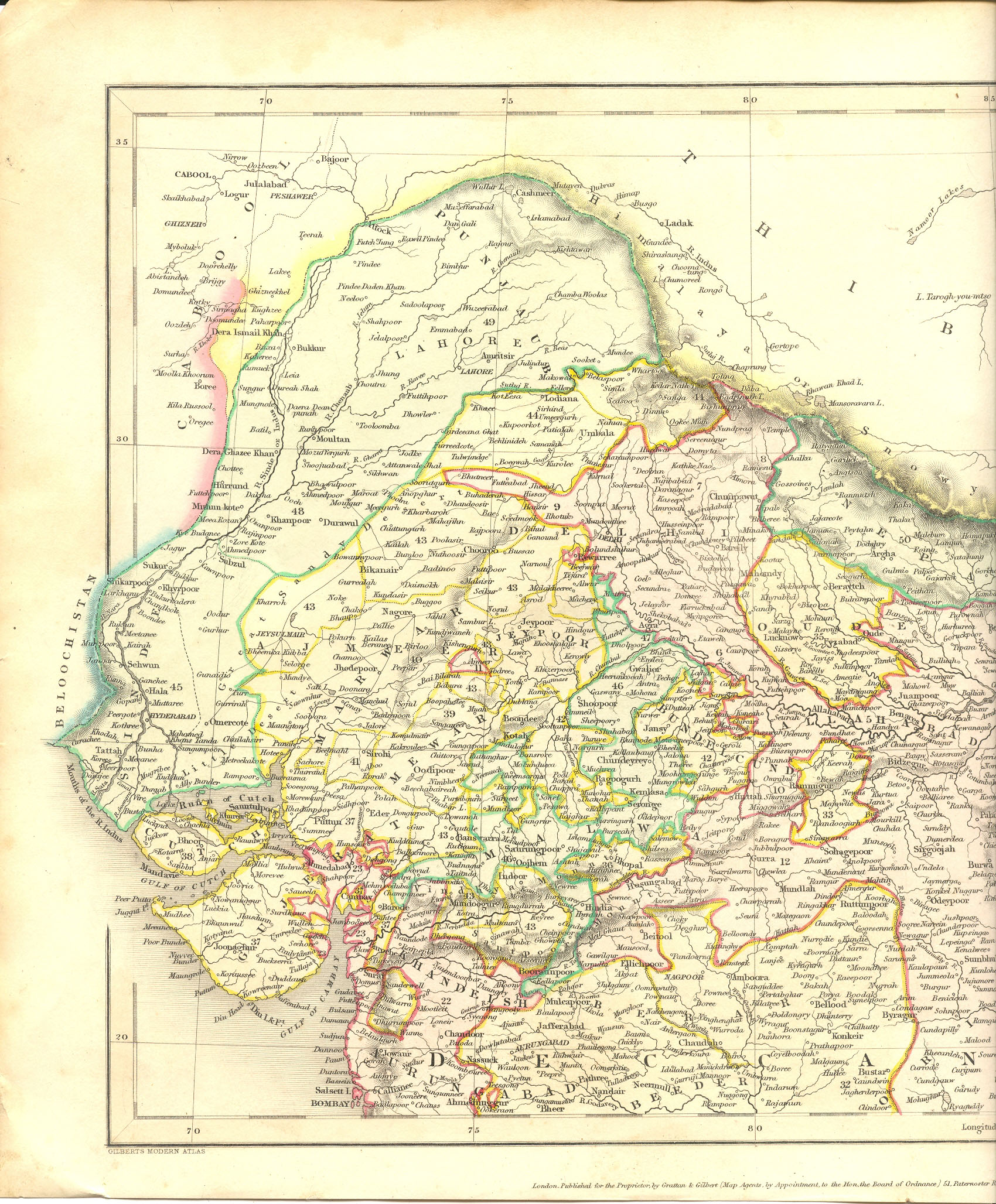
1840 Map of Punjab Side, Indian Continent by John Archer

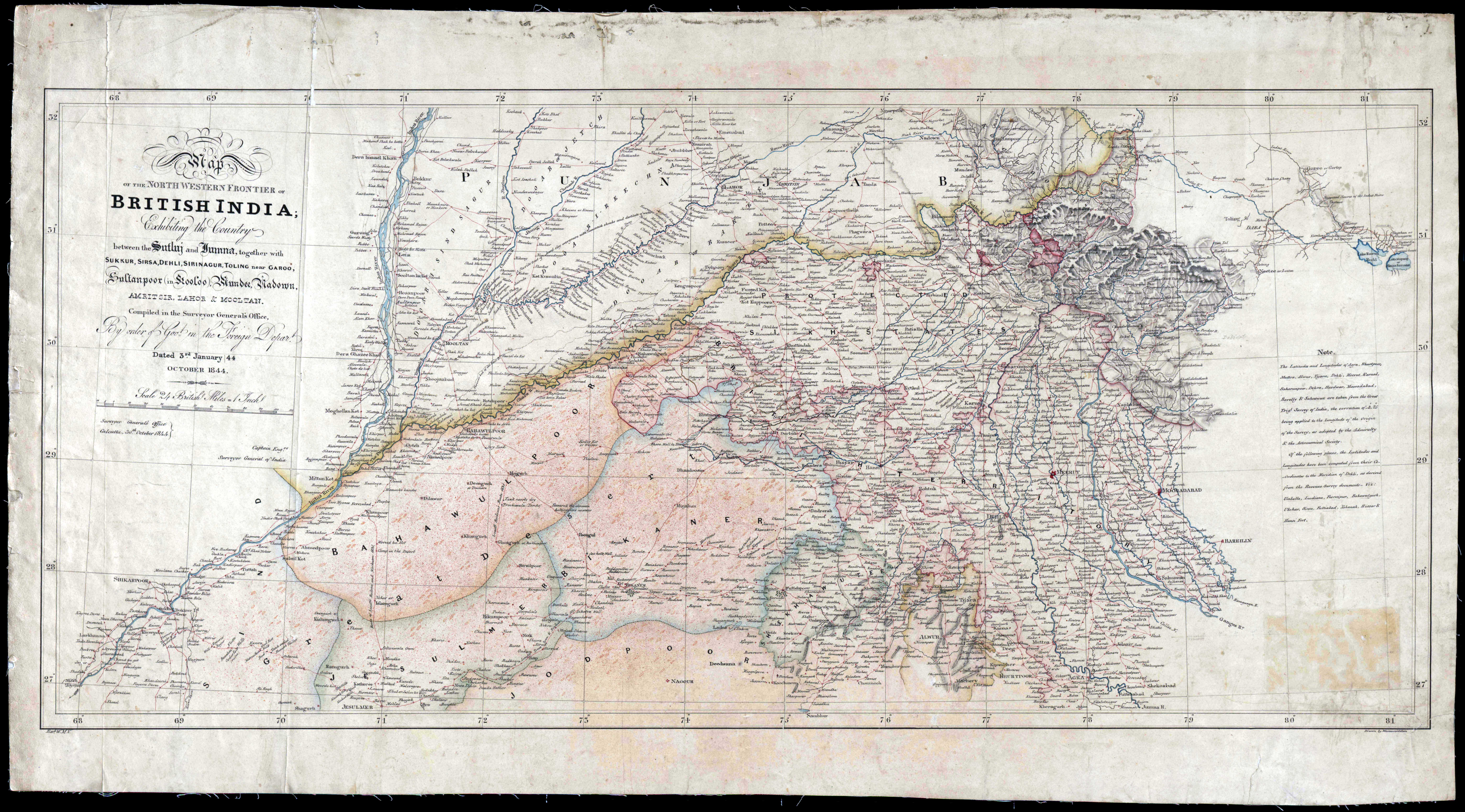
1844 Showing Delhi Territory and its Surroundings

1844 Maps of the Indian Subcontinent, within Delhi Territory

1848 Indian Continent with Delhi Territory

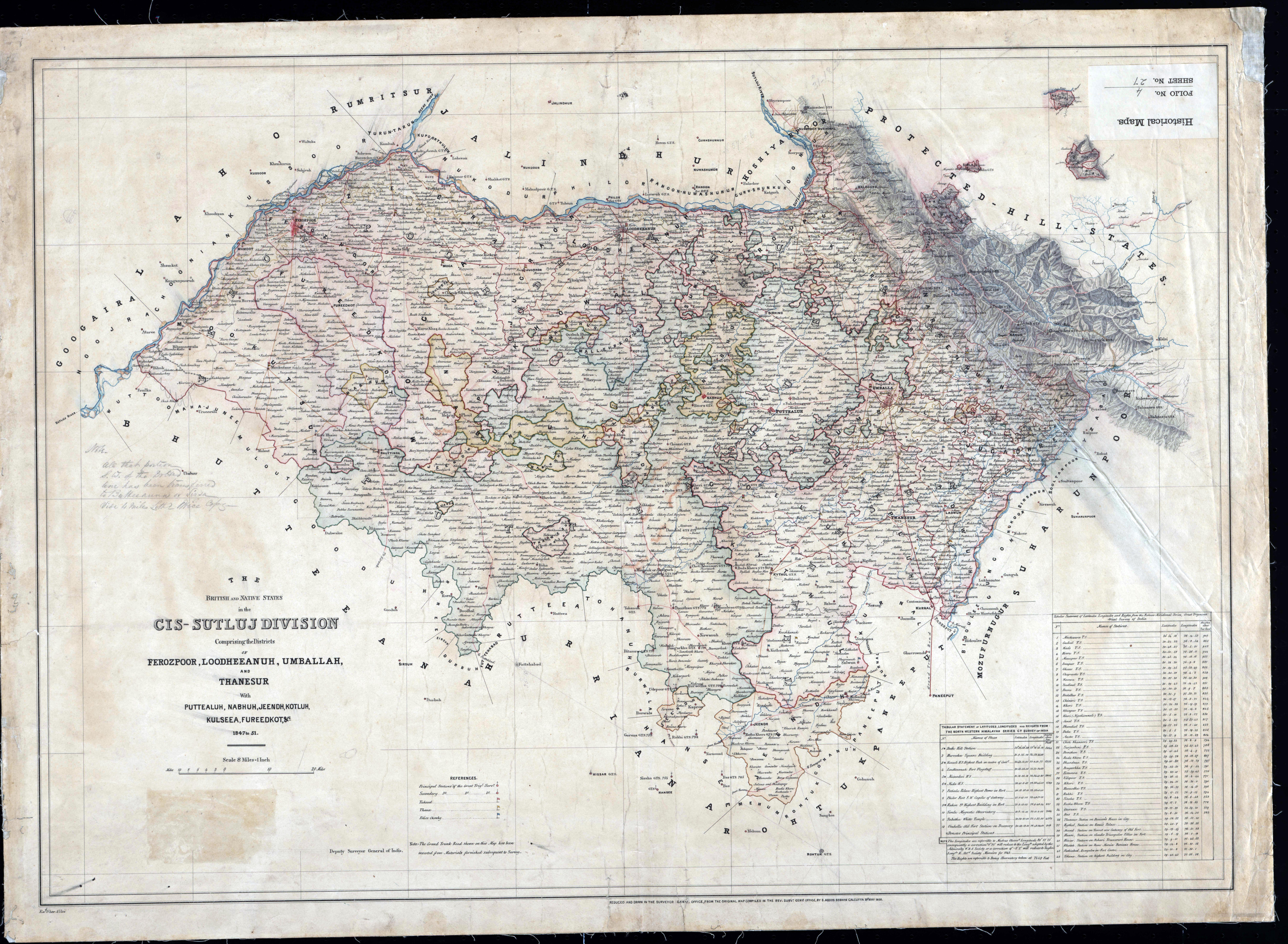
Cis-Sutlej Division & Principalities of Punjab (1847–51)

=== Internal Maps of delhi territory ===
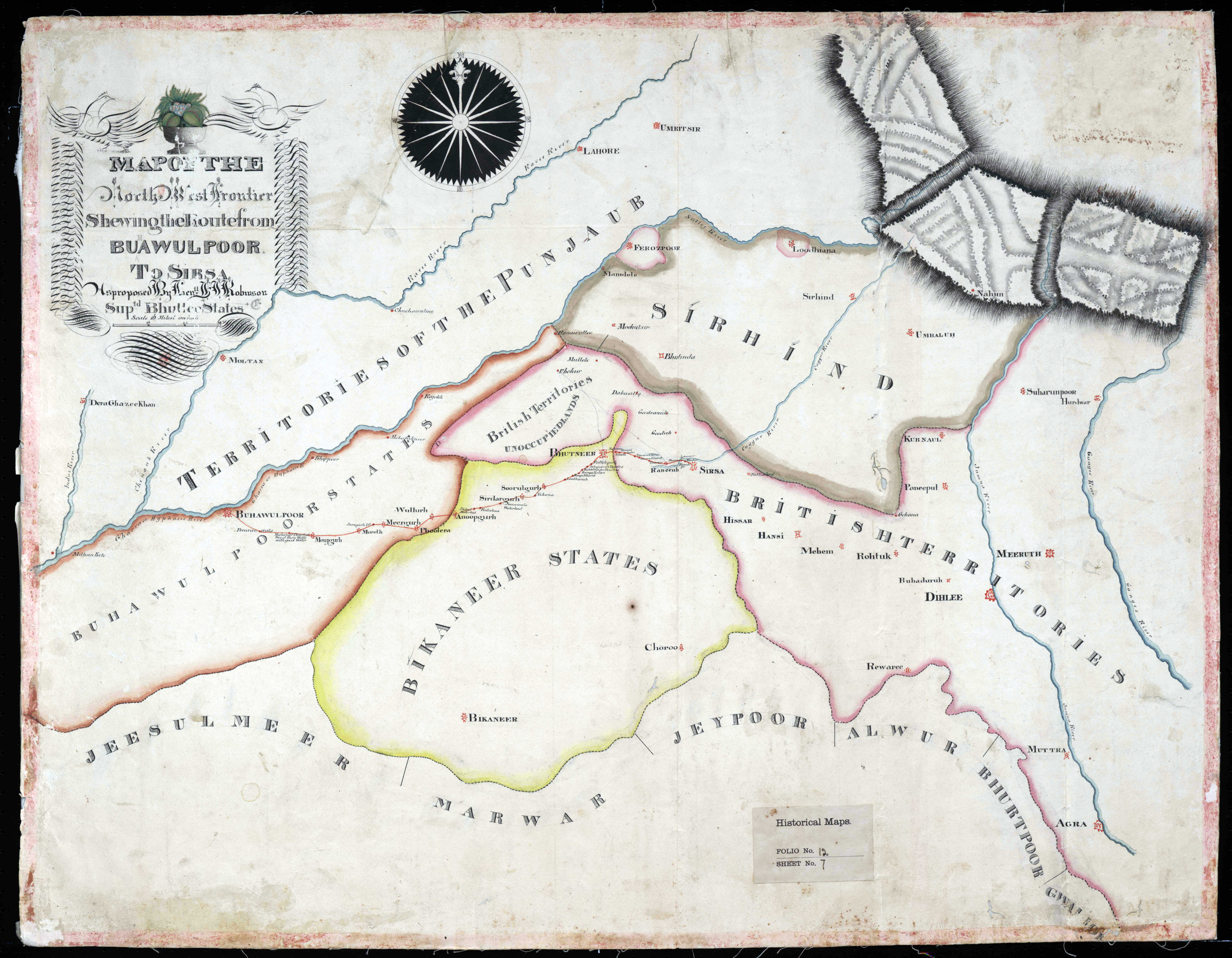
Map of the northwest frontier showing the route from Bahawalpur to Sirsa

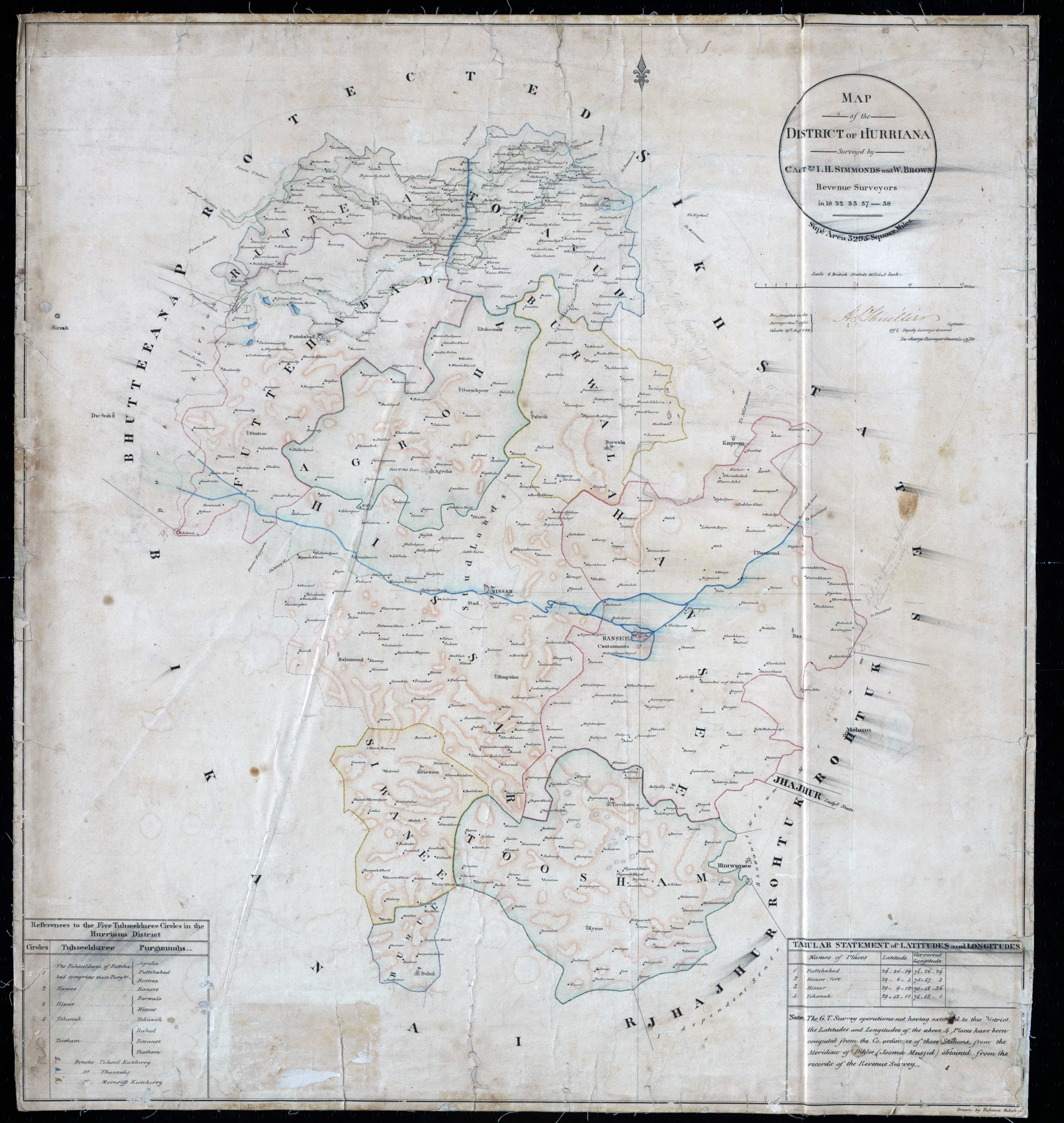
Map of Haryana District surveyed 1832–33 and 1837–38, recompiled 1848

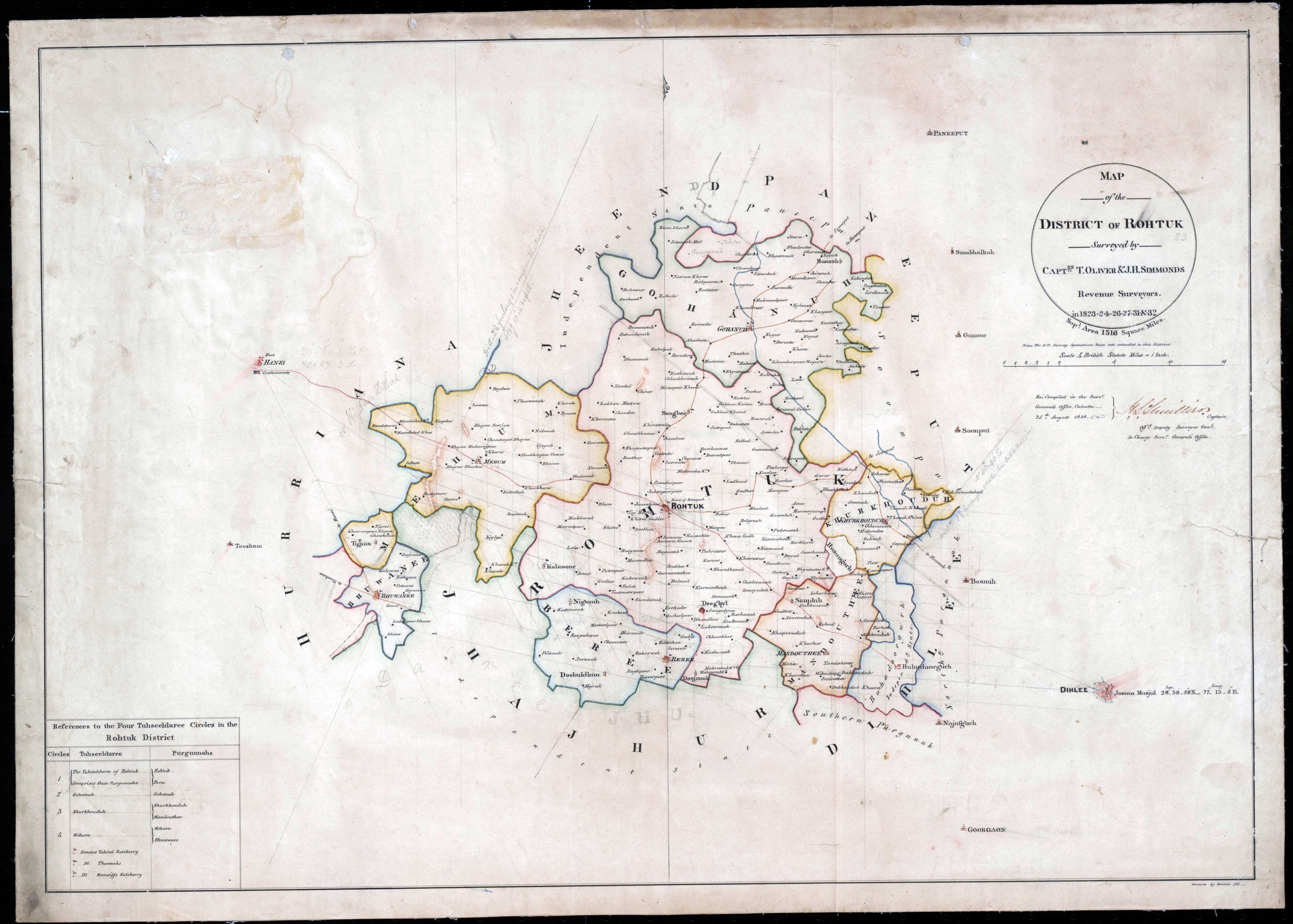
Map of Rohtak District surveyed 1823–32, recompiled 1848

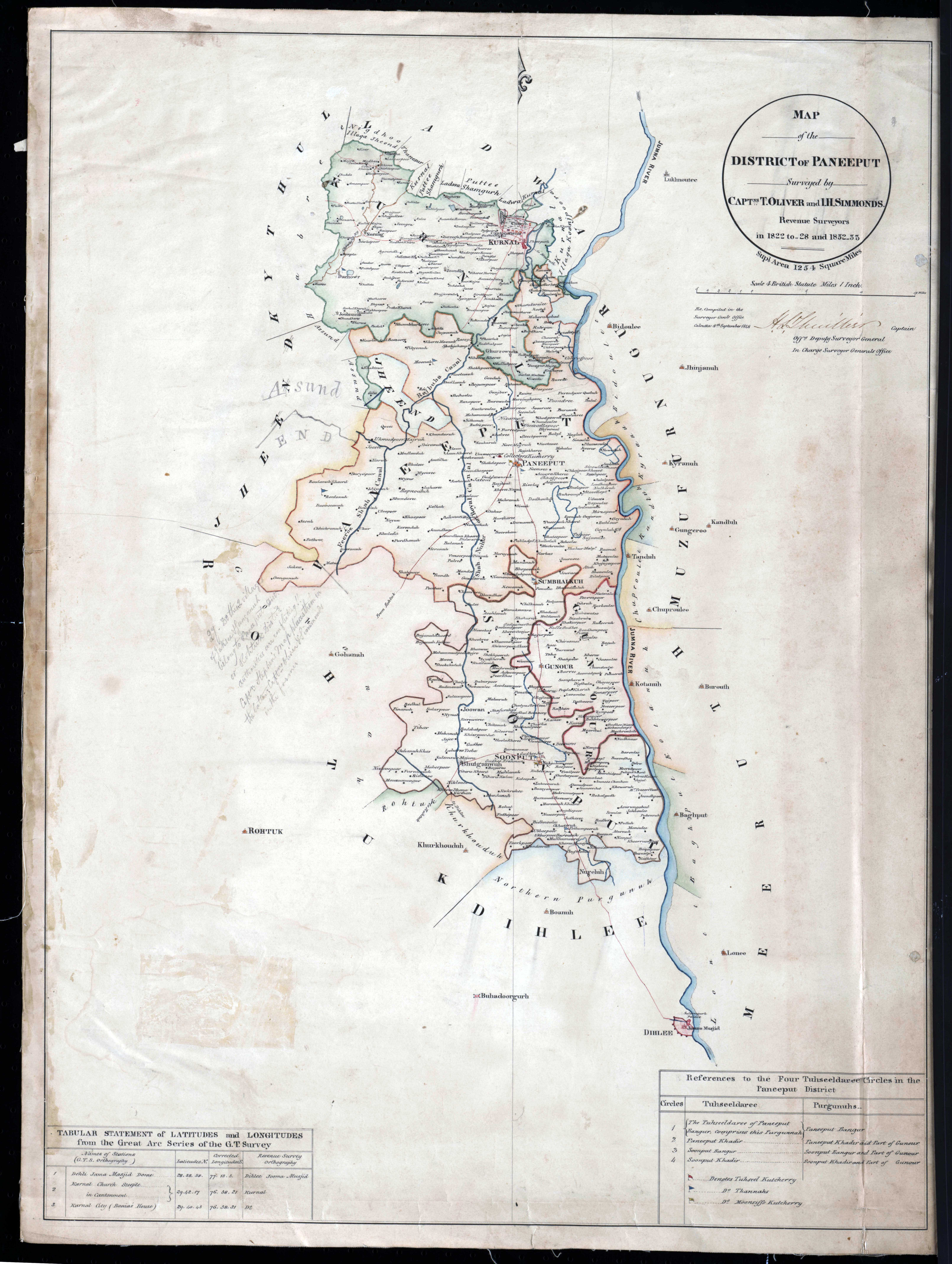
Map of Panipat District surveyed 1822–28 and 1832–38, recompiled 1848

Map of Gurgaon District showing the boundaries after transfer, 1841

Map of Haryana District or the Western Division of Delhi, surveyed by William Brown in 1837–38, compiled in 1859

Map of Haryana District or the Western Division of Delhi, surveyed by William Brown in 1837–38, compiled in 1859 (part 2)

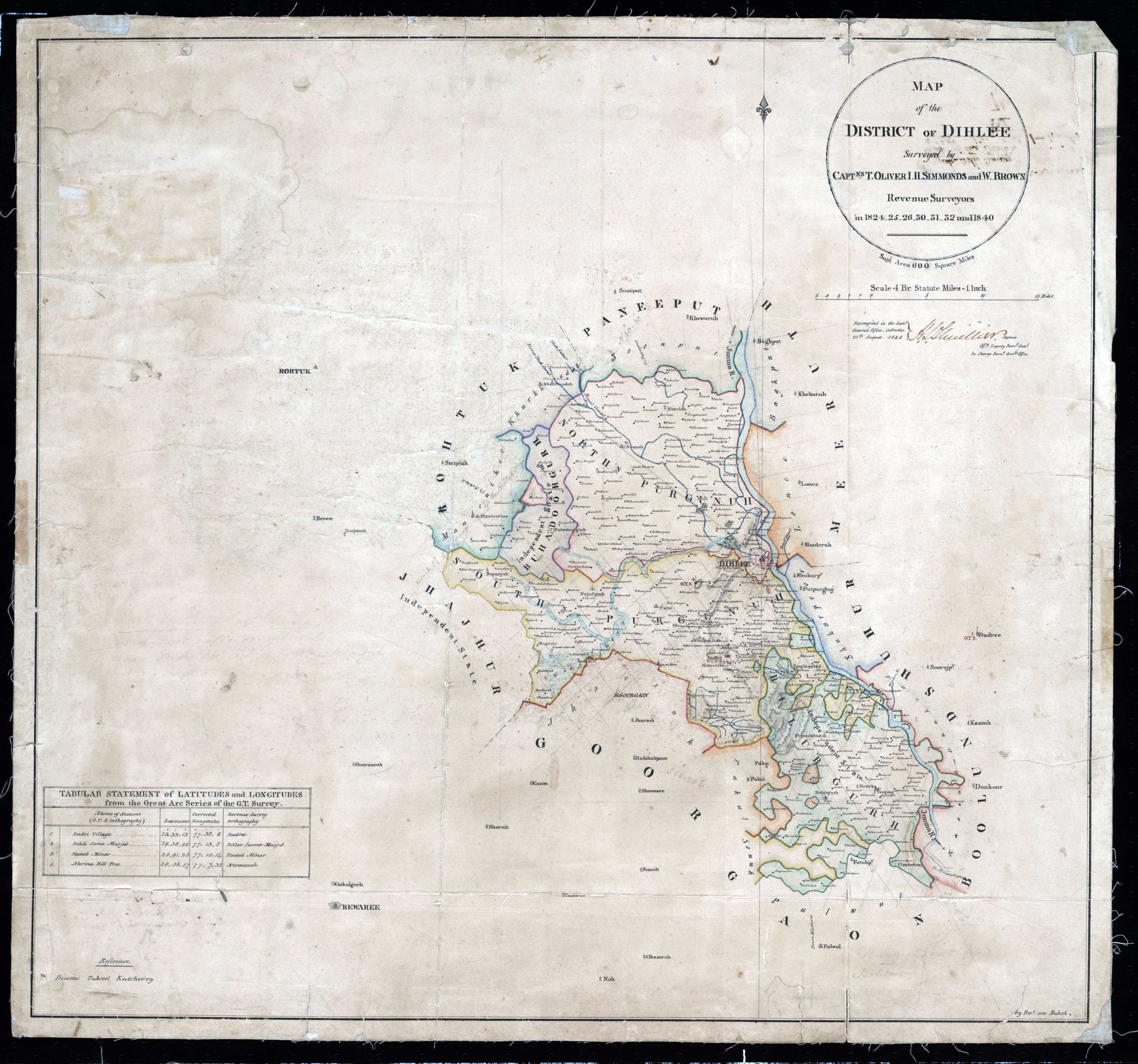
Map of Delhi District surveyed 1824–26, 1830–32, and 1840, recompiled in 1848

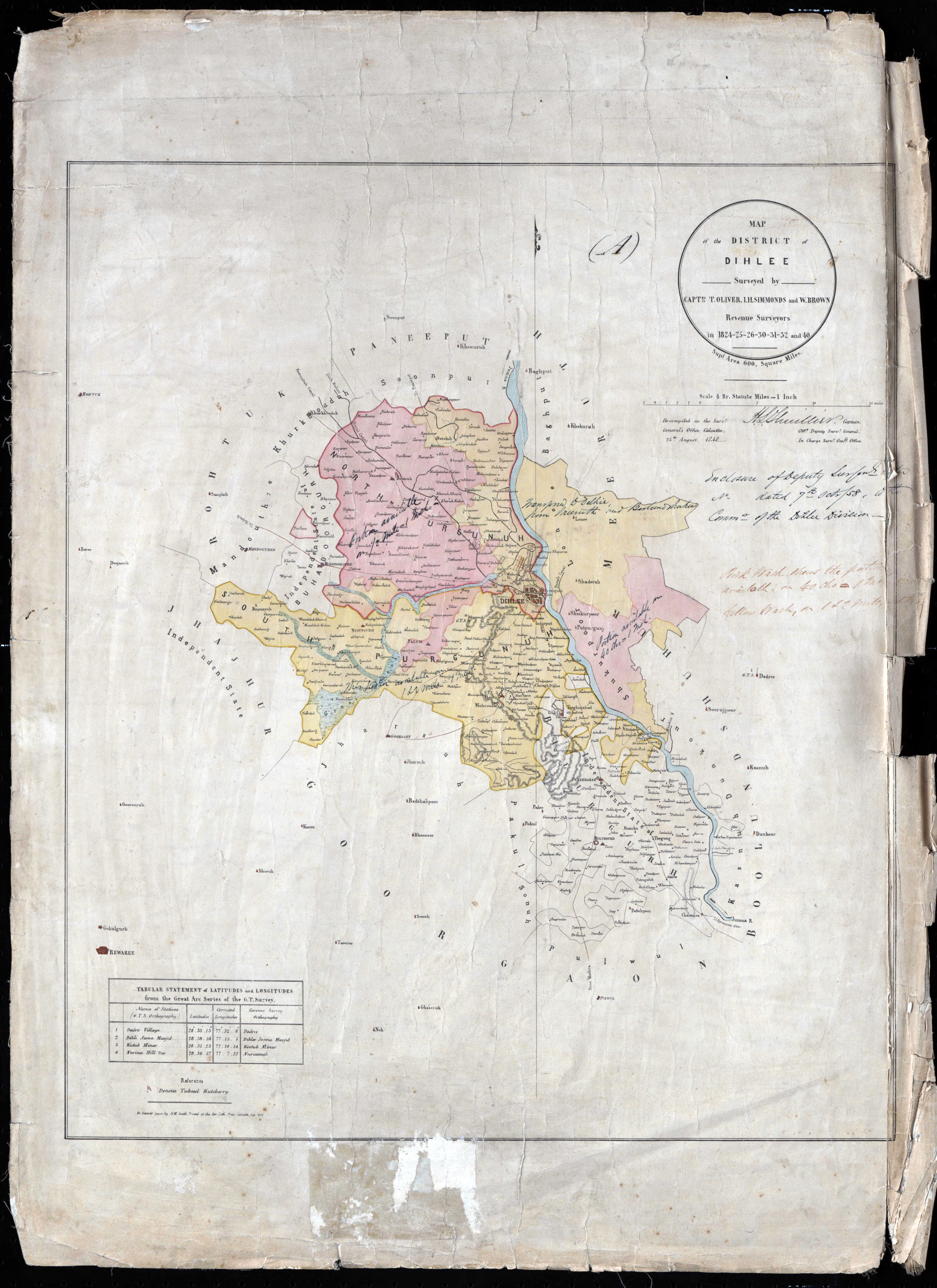
Map of Delhi District surveyed 1824–26, 1830–32, and 1840, recompiled in 1848 (part 2)

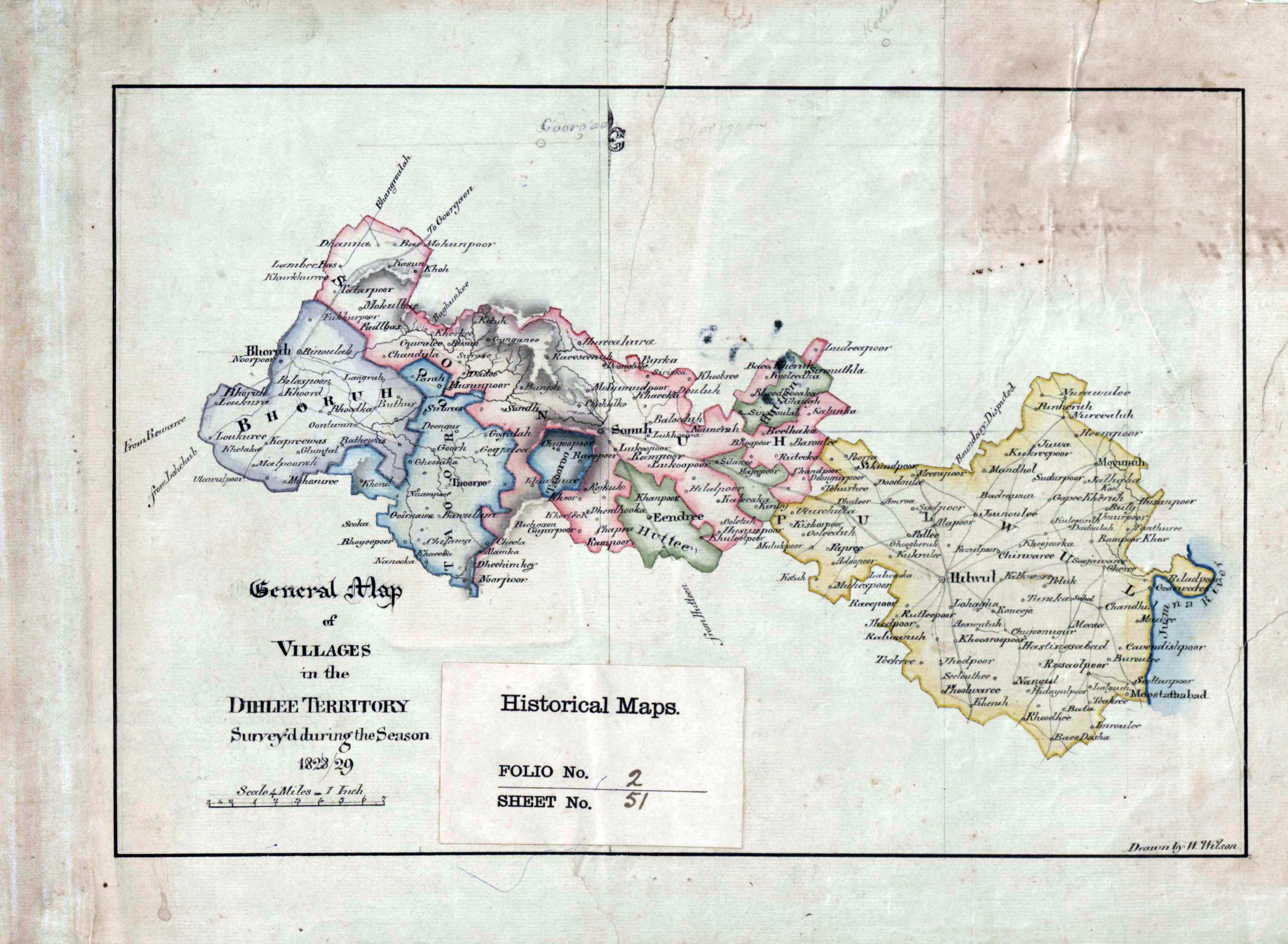
General map of villages in Delhi Territory, surveyed by T. Oliver and drawn by H. Wilson, 1828–29

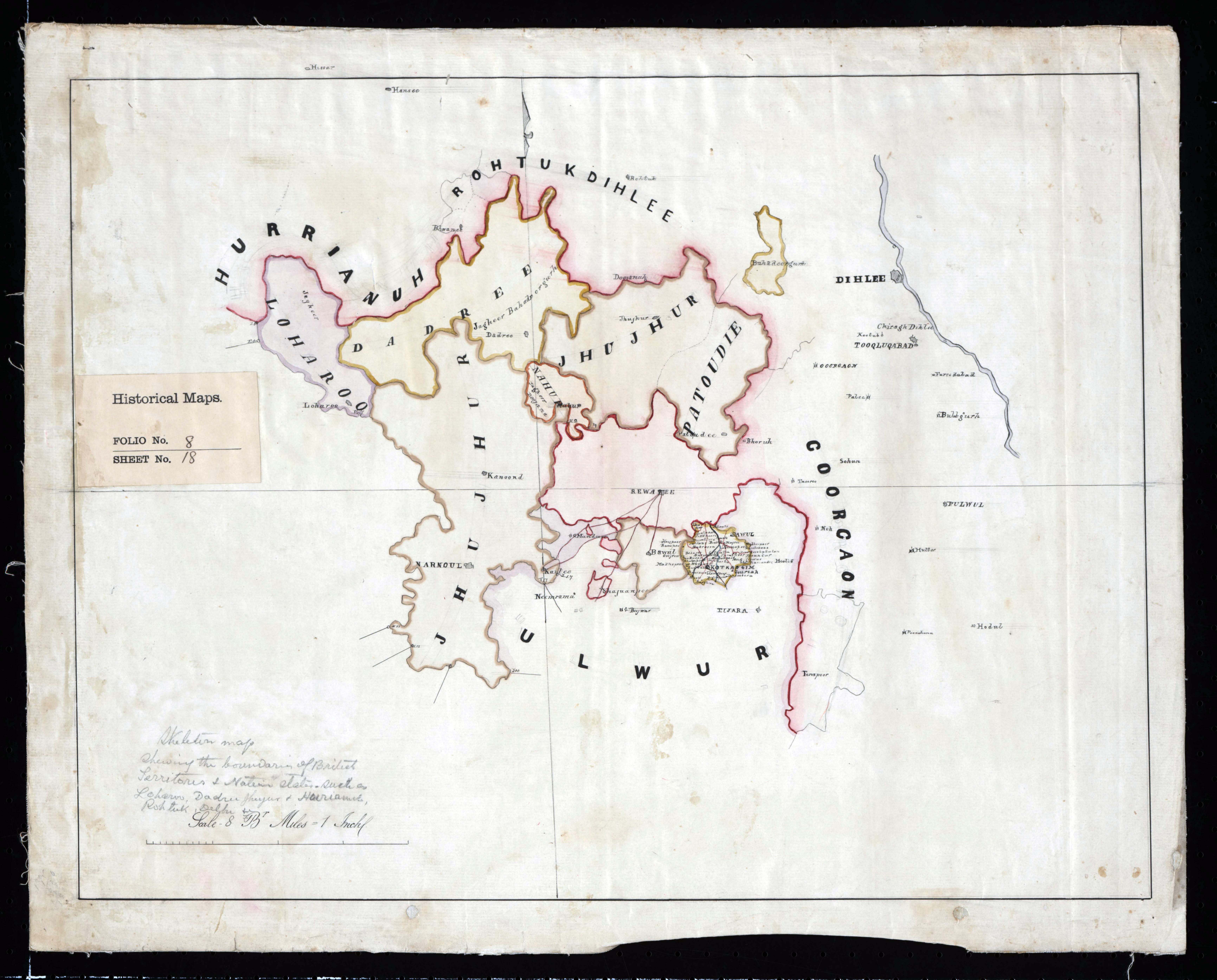
Skeleton map showing the boundaries of British territories and Native States in Punjab, drawn by A. C. Wyatt, 1861

Showing N.W. Province Including Delhi Territory Map 1836

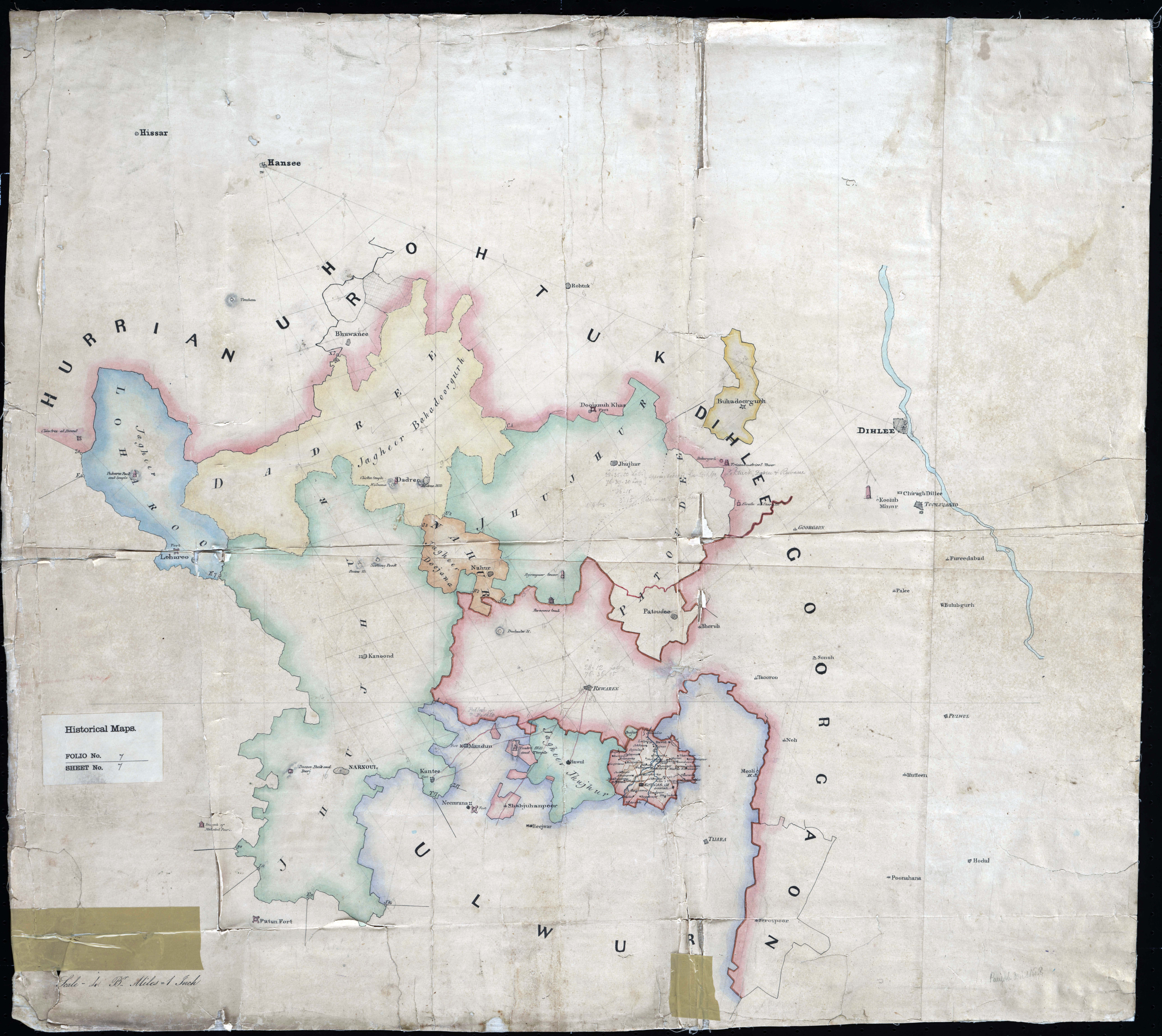
Map showing portions to the west and south-west of Delhi

=== Map of the 1909 & 1916 — Including Delhi Territory ===
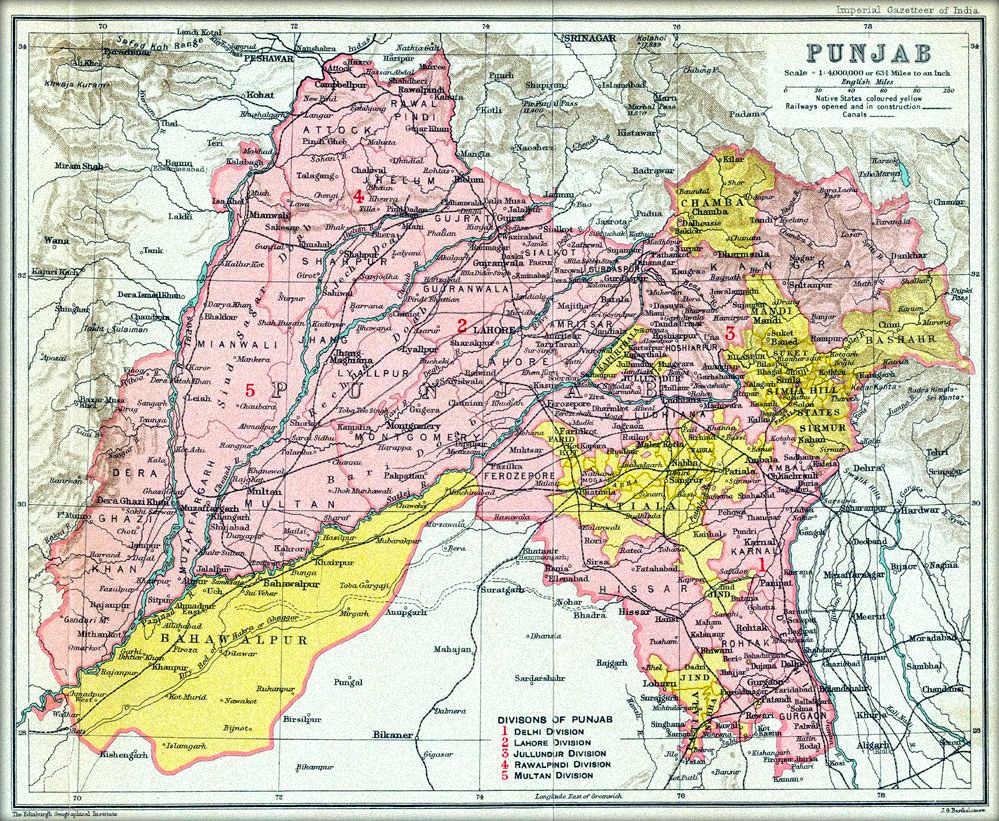
Map of British Punjab (1909)

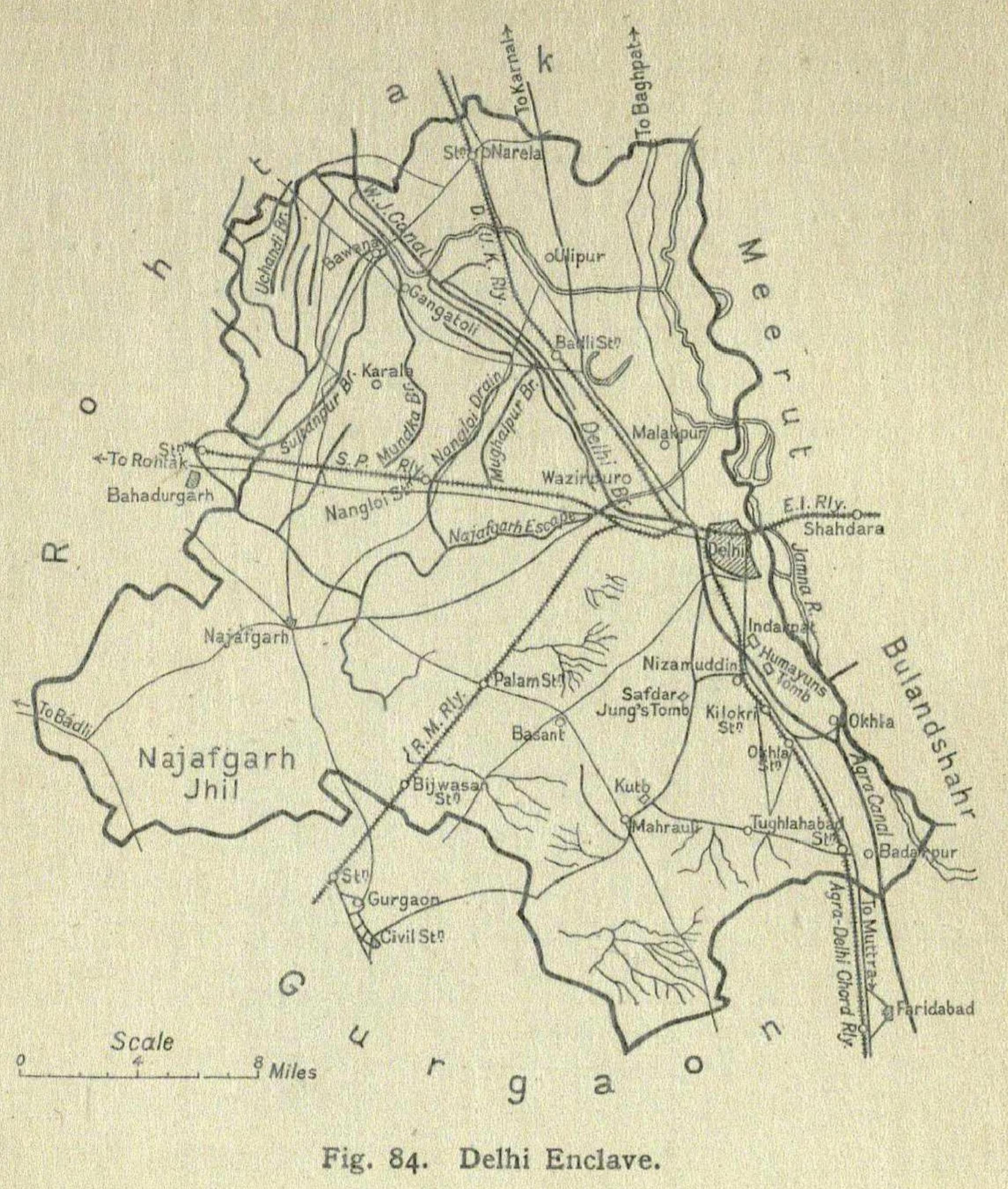
Map of Delhi Enclave, Punjab Province, British India (1916)

== See also ==
- Cis-Sutlej States
- Company rule in India
- British Raj
- United Provinces of Agra and Oudh
