= Hadiyaya railway station =

Railway station in Punjab, India

Hadiyaya

General information
- Location: Khuddi Kalan, Handiaya, Barnala district, Panjab; India
- Coordinates: 30°20′13″N 75°28′37″E
- Elevation: 229 metres (751 ft)
- System: Indian Railways station
- Owner: Indian Railways
- Operator: Northern Railway
- Line: Bathinda–Rajpura line
- Platforms: 2
- Tracks: Double Electric-Line

Construction
- Structure type: Standard (on ground)

Other information
- Status: Functioning
- Station code: HYA
- Zone(s): Northern Railway
- Division(s): Ambala

Services
Preceding station	Indian Railways	Following station
Ghunas towards ?	Northern Railway zone Bathinda–Rajpura line	Barnala towards ?
Location
- Interactive map

Hadiyaya railway station or Handiaya railway station is a railway station in located on Bathinda–Rajpura railway line operated by the Northern Railway under Ambala railway division. It is situated at Khuddi Kalan, Handiaya in Barnala district in the Indian state of Panjab.
