= Sekha railway station =

Railway station in Punjab, India

Sekha

General information
- Location: Sekha, Barnala district, Panjab; India
- Coordinates: 30°22′50″N 75°38′38″E
- Elevation: 233 metres (764 ft)
- System: Indian Railways station
- Owner: Indian Railways
- Operator: Northern Railway
- Line: Bathinda–Rajpura line
- Platforms: 3
- Tracks: Double Electric-Line

Construction
- Structure type: Standard (on ground)

Other information
- Status: Functioning
- Station code: SEQ
- Zone(s): Northern Railway
- Division(s): Ambala

Services
Preceding station	Indian Railways	Following station
Barnala towards ?	Northern Railway zone Bathinda–Rajpura line	Alal towards ?
Location
- Interactive map

Sekha railway station is a railway station in located on Bathinda–Rajpura railway line operated by the Northern Railway under Ambala railway division. It is situated at Sekha in Barnala district in the Indian state of Panjab.
