= Sekha =

Sekha Sekha
- village
- Location in Punjab, India Sekha (India)
- Coordinates: 30.358619°N 75.643959°E
- Country: India
- State: Punjab
- District: Barnala
- Established: 2006

Area
  - Total: 22.9 km^{2} (8.8 sq mi)

Population (2011)
  - Total: 7,594
  - Rank: 6th largest village in district
  - Density: 332/km^{2} (859/sq mi)

Languages
  - Official: Punjabi
- Time zone: UTC+5:30 (IST)
- PIN: 148024
- Telephone code: 01679
- Vehicle registration: PB-19
- Nearest city: Barnala
- Lok Sabha constituency: Sangrur
- Avg. summer temperature: 30–40 °C (86–104 °F)
- Avg. winter temperature: 00–20 °C (32–68 °F)

Sekha is a large village in Barnala district, Punjab, India. It is located 7 km to the east of Barnala on Bathinda-Patiala railway line and Barnala-Dhuri road.

It is a medium-sized village with a population of around 10,000. All the basic amenities are present at a commutable distance.

== History ==
Sekha used to be a cluster of 22 villages called 'Bahia' (in Punjabi meaning composed of twenty-two entities). The people living here were of Sidhu clan. Once Guru Teg Bahadur ji, the ninth Sikh Guru, arrived in the 'Bahia' during his Malwa Visit. But the ruler of 'Bahia' refused to give the Guru a piece of land to live on for few days. The ruler asked the Guru to leave the place. Guru Teg Bahadur got angry and cursed the 'Bahia' by saying "Bahia Hoju Thehia" (Punjabi: ਬਾਹੀਆ ਹੋਜੂ ਥੇਹਿਆ) meaning- "Bahia will collapse into a heap" Due to his curse the whole of Bahia turned into a heap of debris. This The (Punjabi: ਥੇਹ) still exists to the west of the main village and the place where Guru Teg Bahadur ji meditated has been turned into a beautiful Gurudwara named 'Gurudwara Patshahi Naumi, Sekha'. Every year on 22 Poh (Punjabi Calendar) i.e. in early January a three-day fair is held in the village in remembrance of the Coming of Guru Teg Bahadur ji to the village. Later on, a new village to the west of Bahia was built which is now known as Sekha.

== Religious places ==
There are many religious places in the village. Gurudwara Patshahi Naumi (Gurudwara of the ninth Guru) towards the west of the village on Barnala road. This is the place where the ninth Guru meditated during his visit to the village. There is another Gurudwara near the village railway station. Near the Grain Market, there is a famous Tilla of Baba Tehaldas. It is a multi-religious place with a Temple, Gurudwara et al. in it. In the heart of the village, there is a Memorial Gurudwara of Bhai Moola Singh. There are numerous other religious places in the village.

== Transport ==
- There are well maintained roads in the village and people have an option to use the regular bus service which plies between Barnala and the neighbouring town of Dhuri (Sangrur) since the village lies on the Barnala-Dhuri road. Other than this, taxis are readily available as well at the local taxi stand located near the market towards the western end of the village.
- Sekha railway station lies roughly towards the north of the village and is also in very close proximity to the neighbouring villages of Harbanspura and Jhaloor. The station lies on the Bathinda–Rajpura line.
