= Tapa, Punjab =

Tapa Tapa Mandi
- city
- Location in Punjab, India Tapa (India)
- Coordinates: 30°17′53″N 75°22′08″E
- Country: India
- State: Punjab
- District: Barnala

Government
  - Body: Municipal Corporation

Population (2011)
  - Total: 23,248

Languages
  - Official: Punjabi
- Time zone: UTC+5:30 (IST)
- PIN: 148108
- Telephone Code: (+91) 1679
- Vehicle registration: PB 73

Tapa is a small town, municipal council and administrative area in Barnala district in the Indian state of Punjab. Tapa is mainly known as Tapa Mandi, "Mandi" being a word that translate to grain market. As Tapa has been famous for its grain market, many people from nearby villages come here to sell their crops and grains. This has been the main source of income and job opportunities for many people around this area. Tapa is well known for its historic Deras and Guruduwaras and for best economy in its district.

== Demographics ==
As of 2011 India census, Tapa had a population of 23,248. Males constitute 54% of the population and females 46%. Tapa has an average literacy rate of 69.8%: male literacy is 64.4%, and female literacy is 57.2%. In Tapa, 12% of the population is under 6 years of age.

== Transportation ==
Tapa is situated at Barnala-Bathinda Main Road (NH 7) between Barnala and Bathinda, Moga and Mansa. It is 24 km towards Bathinda from Barnala and 42 km towards Barnala from Bathinda. Moga Road also passes through it towards Pakho-Kenchian. Tapa railway station is situated on Bathinda–Rajpura line under Ambala railway division.

== Education ==
=== Schools ===
- Government Boys Sen. Sec. School, Tapa
- Government Girls Sen. Sec. School, Tapa
- Holy Angels Public High School, Tapa
- Sarvhitkari Vidya Mandir Public High School, Tapa
- Shivalik Public Sen. Sec. School, Tapa
- Jawahar Navodaya Vidyalaya, Dhilwan (Tapa)
- Shama Garden International Senior Secondary School, Tapa
- Arya Samaj Public High School, Tapa
- S.S.N Senior Secondary School, Tapa
- Guru Nanak Dev Public High School, Tapa
- Dashmesh Public High School, Dhillwan (Tapa Mandi)
