= Dant =

Dant may refer to:

== Places ==
- Dant, Kentucky, is an unincorporated community in Marion County, Kentucky, United States

== People with the surname ==
- Adam Dant, British artist
- Charles "Bud" Dant (1907–1999), American musician, arranger and composer
- Jenni Dant (born 1982), American basketball player
- Wendy Dant Chesser, American politician

== See also ==
- Cerdd Dant (string music), is the art of vocal improvisation over a given melody in Welsh musical tradition
- Dant katha, ("tooth stories"), are Indian folk legends or fables
