= Tapa railway station =

Railway station in Punjab, India

Tapa

General information
- Location: Sadar Bazar, Tapa Mandi, Barnala district, Panjab; India
- Coordinates: 30°18′11″N 75°22′01″E
- Elevation: 222 metres (728 ft)
- System: Indian Railways station
- Owner: Indian Railways
- Operator: Northern Railway
- Line: Bathinda–Rajpura line
- Platforms: 1
- Tracks: Double Electric-Line

Construction
- Structure type: Standard (on ground)

Other information
- Status: Functioning
- Station code: JHK
- Zone(s): Northern Railway
- Division(s): Ambala

Services
Preceding station	Indian Railways	Following station
Jethuke towards ?	Northern Railway zone Bathinda–Rajpura line	Ghunas towards ?
Location
- Interactive map

Tapa railway station is a railway station in located on Bathinda–Rajpura railway line operated by the Northern Railway under Ambala railway division. It is situated at Sadar Bazar, Tapa Mandi in Barnala district in the Indian state of Panjab.
