= Handiaya =

- Town
- Location in Punjab, India Handiaya (India)
- Coordinates: 30.3413°N 75.5117°E
- Country: India
- State: Punjab
- District: Barnala

Population (2011)
  - Total: 12,507

Languages
  - Official: Punjabi
- Time zone: UTC+5:30 (IST)
- Postal code: 148107
- Vehicle registration: Pb19

Handiaya is a town and a nagar panchayat in Barnala district in the Indian state of Punjab.

== Demographics ==
The Handiaya Nagar Panchayat has population of 12,507 of which 6,810 are males while 5,697 are females as per report released by Census India 2011. The town is divided into 11 wards.

The population of children aged 0-6 is 1670 which is 13.35 % of total population of Handiaya (NP). In Handiaya Nagar Panchayat, the female sex ratio is 837 against state average of 895. Moreover the child sex ratio in Handiaya is around 843 compared to Punjab state average of 846. The literacy rate of Handiaya town is 66.26 % lower than state average of 75.84 %. In Handiaya, male literacy is around 71.29 % while the female literacy rate is 60.25 %.
Handiaya Nagar Panchayat has total administration over 2,702 houses to which it supplies basic amenities like water and sewerage. It is also authorize to build roads within Nagar Panchayat limits and impose taxes on properties coming under its jurisdiction.

The table below shows the population of different religious groups in Handiaya town, as of 2011 census.

Population by religious groups in Handiaya town, 2011 census
Religion	Total	Female	Male
Sikh	7,765	3,661	4,104
Hindu	4,059	1,724	2,335
Muslim	671	307	364
Christian	10	5	5
Buddhist	2	0	2
Total	12,507	5,697	6,810

== Transportation ==
Hadiyaya railway station is situated at Handiaya on Bathinda–Rajpura line operated by the Northern Railway under Ambala railway division.
