= Gill Kalan =

- Village
- Country: India
- State: Punjab
- District: Bathinda
- Tehsil: Rampura

Government
  - Type: Panchayat
  - Current Sarpanch: Angrej Singh ( Teja ) (Indian National Congress)
- Elevation: 220 m (720 ft)

Population (2011)
  - Total: 4,000

Languages
  - Official: Punjabi
- Time zone: UTC+5:30 (IST)
- PIN: 151103
- STD code: 01651
- Website: www.indiamapia.com/Bathinda/gill_kalan.html

Gill Kalan is a village in Rampura Tehsil in Bathinda District of Punjab State, India. It is located 38 km east of District headquarters Bathinda, 5 km from Rampura and 177 km from State capital Chandigarh.

The Gill Kalan Pin code is 151103 and postal head office is Rampura Phul.

Burj Mansa (1 km), Chotian (4 km), Bugran (4 km), Pitho (4 km), Jethuke (4 km) are the nearby villages to Gill Kalan. Gill Kalan is surrounded by Phul Tehsil towards the north, Nathana Tehsil towards the west, Sehna Tehsil towards the north, and Maur Tehsil towards the south.

Rampura Phul, Maur, Barnala, and Bathinda are the nearby cities to Gill Kalan.

== Demographics ==
Punjabi is the local language here.

== Transport ==
Rampura Bus Stand is the very nearby bus stand to Gill kalan.

=== By Rail ===
Jethuke Railway Station, Rampura Phul Railway Station are the very nearby railway stations to Gill Kalan. However, Bhatinda Jn Railway station is major railway station 38 km near to Gill Kalan.

== Education ==
=== Nearby colleges ===
- Mata Sundri Girls College Dhade

Address : Dikh Road

- Jyoti B.ed. College

Address : Rampura Punjab

=== Schools ===
- PATH FINDER GLOBAL SCHOOL

ADDRESS : RAMPURA GILL KALAN ROAD (CONTACT NO. 99880-23888)

- GOVT. HIGH SCHOOL GILL KALAN

ADDRESS : GILL KALAN, TEHSIL RAMPURA, BATHINDA, PUNJAB. PIN- 151103, P.O. RAMPURA PHUL

== Banks ==
Bank: State Bank of India

== ATM ==
ATM: State Bank of India

- Address: VPO Gill Kalan, Dist Bhatinda
- State: Punjab
- District: Bathinda
- Branch: Gill Kalan
- Contact: 01651-234043
- IFSC Code: SBIN0010750 (used for RTGS, IMPS and NEFT transactions)
- Branch Code: Last six characters of IFSC Code represent Branch code.
- MICR Code: 151002171

== Religion ==
Gurudwara Shri Patshahi Chhevin Sahib

Related to:- Sri Guru Hargobind Sahib Ji

Address

- Village Gilla Kalan
- District :- Bathinda
- State :- Punjab.
- Phone Number :-

=== Gill Kalan Data ===
Particulars	Total	Male	Female
Total No. of Houses	184	-	-
Population	3,880	2,024	1,856
Child (0-6)	411	223	188
Schedule Caste	1,443	755	688
Schedule Tribe	0	0	0
Literacy	61.49 %	66.85 %	55.70 %
Total Workers	1,819	1,186	633
Main Worker	1,299	0	0
Marginal Worker	520	270	250
