= Devendra Satyarthi =

Indian folklorist and writer

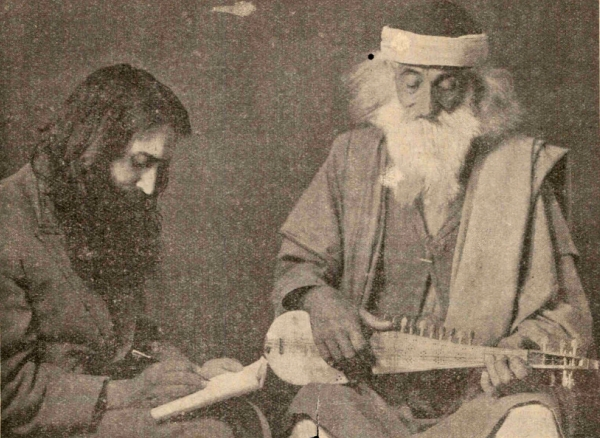
- Satyarthi c. 1935 noting a Pathan folksong
- Born: 28 May 1908; Bhadaur, Barnala, Punjab, India
- Died: 12 February 2003 (aged 94)
- Occupation: Writer
- Years active: 1927–2003
- Known for: Punjabi folklore
- Awards: Padma Shri; Hindi Sahitya Sadhna Samman

Devendra Satyarthi (28 May 1908 – 2003) was an Indian folklorist and writer of Hindi, Urdu, Punjabi literature.

== Early life ==
Born at Bhadaur (Barnala) he did not complete his education and started travelling from 1927 collecting folk songs which he published in his first folk song anthology in 1935 under the name Giddha, which is considered by many as a seminal work.

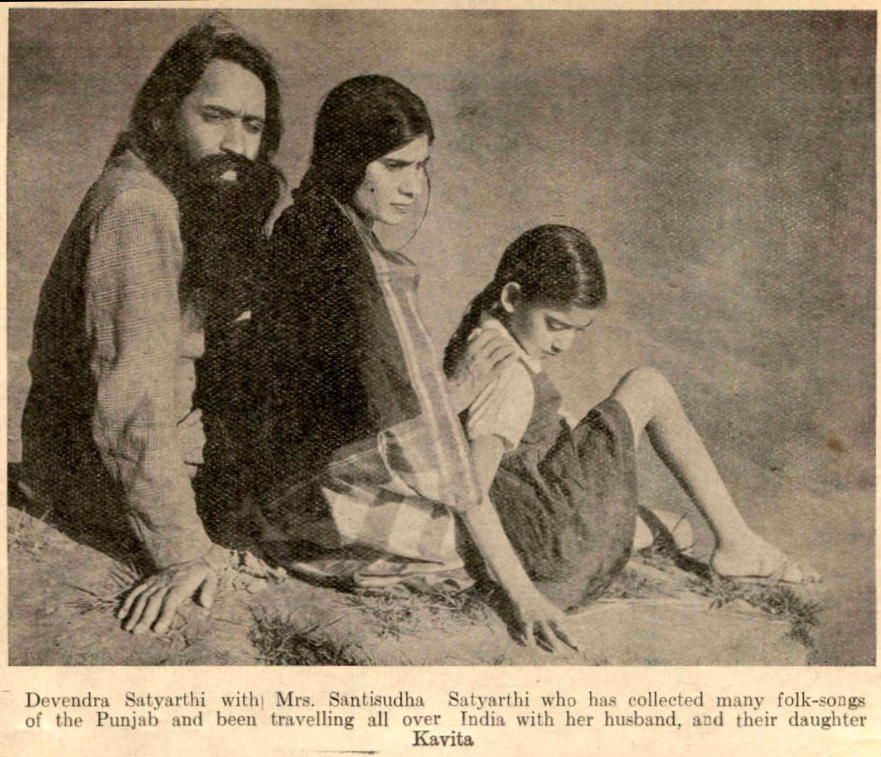
Image of Devendra Satyarthi, his wife and daughter published in Modern Review (1942)

Satyarthi published over 50 books composed of novels, short stories, poems, essays and folksong anthologies in Urdu, Hindi and Punjabi languages, but reportedly on advice from Rabindranath Tagore, he wrote mostly in Punjabi language towards the end. Mere Saakshatkaar, Miss Folklore, Meet My People - Indian Folk Poetry, Pañjābī loka-sāhita wica sainika, Lanka Desa hai Kolambu, Brahmaputra, and Rath ke Pahiye are some of his notable works.

A winner of the Hindi Sahitya Sadhna Samman, Satyarthi was awarded the fourth highest Indian civilian award of Padma Shri by the Government of India in 1977. He died on 12 February 2003, at the age of 94, succumbing to old age illnesses. Pancham, a monthly magazine published from Lahore, brought out a 300-page special issue on him in April 2003 and his life has been documented in a biography, Satyarthi – Ik Dant-katha, written by Nirmal Arpan.

== See also ==
- Folklore of India
