= Chhintanwala railway station =

Railway station in Punjab, India

Chhintanwala

General information
- Location: Nabha Road, Chhintanwala, Patiala district, Punjab; India
- Coordinates: 30°21′57″N 76°00′51″E
- Elevation: 283 metres (928 ft)
- System: Indian Railways station
- Owner: Indian Railways
- Operator: Northern Railway
- Line: Bathinda–Rajpura line
- Platforms: 2
- Tracks: Double Electric-Line

Construction
- Structure type: Standard (on ground)

Other information
- Status: Functioning
- Station code: CTW
- Zone(s): Northern Railway
- Division(s): Ambala

Services
| Preceding station | Indian Railways | Following station |
|---|---|---|
| Kaulseri towards ? | Northern Railway zone Bathinda–Rajpura line | Kakrala towards ? |
Location
- Interactive map

Chhintanwala railway station is a railway station in located on Bathinda–Rajpura railway line operated by the Northern Railway under Ambala railway division. It is situated beside Nabha Road, at Chhintanwala in Patiala district in the Indian state of Punjab.
