= Alal railway station =

Railway station in Punjab, India

Alal

General information
- Location: Alal, Sangrur district, Panjab; India
- Coordinates: 30°22′40″N 75°43′15″E
- Elevation: 235 metres (771 ft)
- System: Indian Railways station
- Owner: Indian Railways
- Operator: Northern Railway
- Line: Bathinda–Rajpura line
- Platforms: 2
- Tracks: Double Electric-Line

Construction
- Structure type: Standard (on ground)

Other information
- Status: Functioning
- Station code: ALAL
- Zone(s): Northern Railway
- Division(s): Ambala

Services
| Preceding station | Indian Railways | Following station |
|---|---|---|
| Sekha towards ? | Northern Railway zone Bathinda–Rajpura line | Dhuri Junction towards ? |
Location
- Interactive map

Alal railway station is a railway station in located on Bathinda–Rajpura railway line operated by the Northern Railway under Ambala railway division. It is situated at Alal in Sangrur district in the Indian state of Panjab.
