= Jethuke railway station =

Railway station in Punjab, India

Jethuke

General information
- Location: Jethuke, Bathinda district, Panjab; India
- Coordinates: 30°17′18″N 75°19′06″E
- Elevation: 220 metres (720 ft)
- System: Indian Railways station
- Owner: Indian Railways
- Operator: Northern Railway
- Line: Bathinda–Rajpura line
- Platforms: 2
- Tracks: Double Electric-Line

Construction
- Structure type: Standard (on ground)

Other information
- Status: Functioning
- Station code: JHK
- Zone(s): Northern Railway
- Division(s): Ambala

Services
Preceding station	Indian Railways	Following station
Rampura Phul towards ?	Northern Railway zone Bathinda–Rajpura line	Tapa towards ?
Location
- Interactive map

Jethuke railway station is a railway station in located on Bathinda–Rajpura railway line operated by the Northern Railway under Ambala railway division. It is situated at Jethuke in Bathinda district in the Indian state of Panjab.
