= Hamidi, Barnala district =

Hamidi
- Village
- Location in Punjab, India
- Coordinates: 30.46°N 75.60°E
- Nation: India
- District: Barnala
- Established: 28 September 1920; 106 years ago
- Founder: Capt. Chanda Singh Mangat

Government
  - Type: Panchayat
  - Body: Hamidi Panchayat
  - Sarpanch: Jaspreet Kaur Mangat
  - MP: Bhagwant Maan (AAP)
  - MLA: Kulwant Singh Pandori (AAP)

Area
  - Total: 14.31 km^{2} (5.53 sq mi)
- Elevation: 233 m (764 ft)

Population
  - Total: 5,080
  - Density: 355/km^{2} (919/sq mi)

Languages
  - Regional: Punjabi
- Time zone: UTC+5:30 (IST)
- PIN: 148025
- Vehicle registration: PB-19

Hamidi is a village in Barnala District, Punjab, India. It is positioned in a rural region of Punjab, and it is one among the 51 villages of Barnala Block of Barnala district. As per the government register, the village number of Hamidi is 9940017. The village has 946 houses. The village has 4 Pattis: Moga, Lehi, Bhupa, and Baghela. The village is governed by Panchayat under Sarpanch Amun singh Mangat 30 December 2025.

== History ==
Hamidi was founded by Capt. Chanda Singh Mangat on 28 September 1880.

== Geography ==
Hamidi is located 13 km towards North from District headquarters Barnala. 20 km from Barnala(Dihati). 135 km from State capital Chandigarh

Hamidi Pin code is 148025 and postal head office is Sherpur .

Thuliwal ( 5 km ), Khiali ( 6 km ), Gumti ( 6 km ), Mangewal ( 6 km ), Karamgarh ( 6 km ) are the nearby Villages to Hamidi. Hamidi is surrounded by Sherpur Tehsil towards East, Barnala Tehsil towards South, Raikot Tehsil towards North, Sehna Tehsil towards west .

Barnala, Raikot, Dhuri, Malerkotla are the nearby cities to Hamidi.

This Place is in the border of the Barnala District and Sangrur District. Sangrur District Sherpur is East towards this place .

== Demographics ==
=== Population ===
According to Census 2011, Hamidi 's population is 5080. Out of this, 2708 are males whereas the females count 2372 here. This village has 526 children in the age bracket of 0–6 years. Out of this, 275 are boys and 251 are girls.

=== Literacy ===
Literacy ratio in Hamidi village is 60%. 3096 out of total 5080 population are educated here. Among males the literacy rate is 64% as 1736 males out of total 2708 are educated, while female literacy rate is 57% as 1360 out of total 2372 females are educated in this Village. The dark side is that illiteracy rate of Hamidi village is 39%. Here 1984 out of total 5080 people are illiterate. Male illiteracy rate here is 35% as 972 males out of total, 2708 are uneducated. In females the illiteracy ratio is 42% and 1012 out of total 2372 females are illiterate in this village.

=== Agriculture ===
The number of employed individual of Hamidi village is 1795 still 3285 are un-employed. And out of 1795 working person, 701 persons are entirely reliant on cultivation.

Particulars	Total	Male	Female
Total No. of Houses	946		
Population	5,080	2,708	2,372
Child (aged:0-6)	1,422	752	670
Literacy	67.98%	71.35%	64.12%
Total Workers	1,795	1,564	231
Main Worker	1,700		
Marginal Worker	95	34	61

== Gallery ==
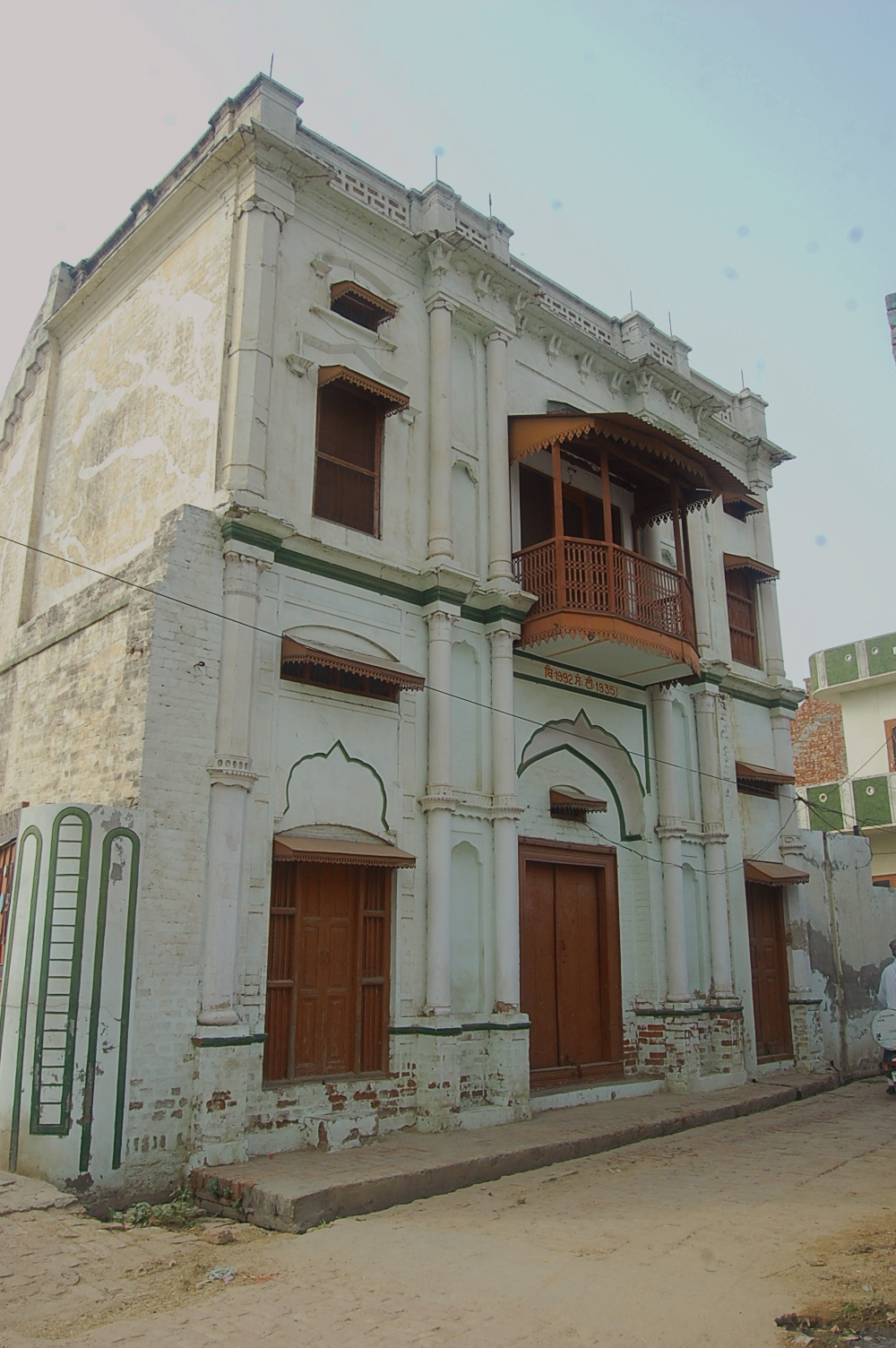
Old Hamidi Mansion
