= Bhila =

- Village
- Location in Punjab, India Bhila (India)
- Coordinates: 30.524740°N 75.426788°E
- Country: India
- State: Punjab
- District: [[Barnala district|[Barnala]]

Government
  - Type: Panchayati raj (India)
  - Body: Gram panchayat

Population (2011)
  - Total: 686
- Sex ratio 364/322♂/♀

Languages
  - Official: Punjabi
  - Other spoken: Hindi
- Time zone: UTC+5:30 (IST)
- PIN: 144601
- Telephone code: 01822
- ISO 3166 code: IN-PB
- Vehicle registration: PB-09
- Website: kapurthala.gov.in

Bhila is a village in Barnala district of Punjab State, India. The village is administrated by a Sarpanch who is an elected representative.

== Demography ==
According to the report published by Census India in 2011, Bhila has a total number of 136 houses and population of 686 of which include 364 males and 322 females. Literacy rate of Bhila is 73.37%, lower than state average of 75.84%. The population of children under the age of 6 years is 89 which is 12.97% of total population of Bhila, and child sex ratio is approximately 894, higher than state average of 846.

== Air travel connectivity ==
The closest airport to the village is Sri Guru Ram Dass Jee International Airport.
