= Rampura Phul railway station =

Railway station in Punjab, India

Rampura Phul
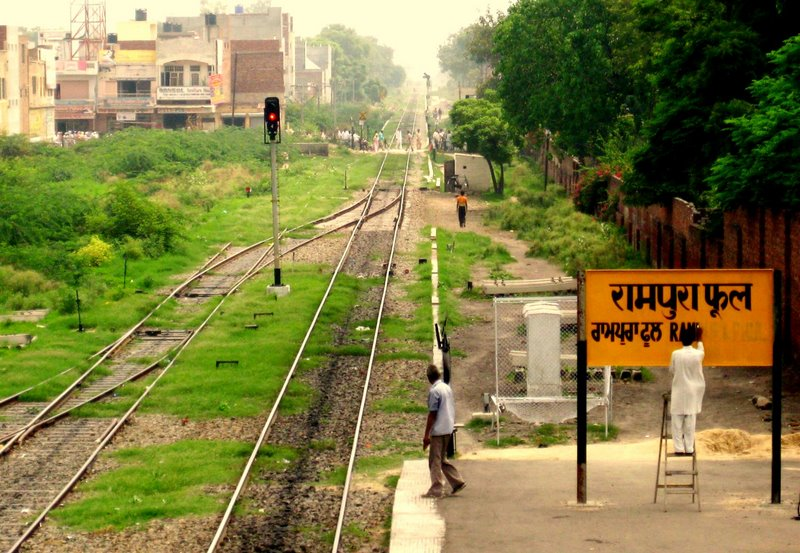
- Rampura Phul railway station

General information
- Location: Rampura Phul, Bathinda district, Panjab; India
- Coordinates: 30°16′10″N 75°14′15″E
- Elevation: 232 metres (761 ft)
- System: Indian Railways station
- Owner: Indian Railways
- Operator: Northern Railway
- Line: Bathinda–Rajpura line
- Platforms: 1
- Tracks: Double Electric-Line

Construction
- Structure type: Standard (on ground)

Other information
- Status: Functioning
- Station code: PUL
- Zone(s): Northern Railway
- Division(s): Ambala

Services
Preceding station	Indian Railways	Following station
Lehra Muhabbat towards ?	Northern Railway zone Bathinda–Rajpura line	Jethuke towards ?
Location
- Interactive map

Rampura Phul railway station is a railway station in located on Bathinda–Rajpura railway line operated by the Northern Railway under Ambala railway division. It is situated at Rampura Phul in Bathinda district in the Indian state of Panjab.
