= Kaire, Punjab =

Kaire
- Village
- Location in Punjab, India Kaire (India)
- Coordinates: 30.447912°N 75.467979°E
- Country: India
- State: Punjab
- District: Barnala

Government
  - Body: Gram Panchayat Kaire

Area
  - Total: 2.59 km^{2} (1.00 sq mi)

Population (2011)
  - Total: 1,641
  - Density: 634/km^{2} (1,640/sq mi)

Languages
  - Official: Punjabi
- Time zone: UTC+5:30 (IST)
- Postal code: 148100

Kaire is a village in Barnala district in the Indian state of Punjab. It is a very small village with a total population of 1641 inhabitants in the East Punjab. The village has a local school (which instructs up to 12th class), a veterinary hospital, a water tank, and a grain market. The village 15 km away from the Barnala district.

== Demographics ==
As of 2011 India census, Kaire had a population of 1641. Males constitute 52% of the population and females 48%. Kaire has an average literacy rate of 61%, lower than the national average of 74.04%: male literacy is 66.3%, and female literacy is 43.5%
