= Nabha railway station =

Railway station in Punjab, India

Nabha

General information
- Location: Nabha, Patiala district, Punjab; India
- Coordinates: 30°21′50″N 76°08′47″E
- Elevation: 248 metres (814 ft)
- System: Indian Railways station
- Owner: Indian Railways
- Operator: Northern Railway
- Line: Bathinda–Rajpura line
- Platforms: 3
- Tracks: Double Electric-Line

Construction
- Structure type: Standard (on ground)

Other information
- Status: Functioning
- Station code: NBA
- Zone(s): Northern Railway
- Division(s): Ambala

Services
| Preceding station | Indian Railways | Following station |
|---|---|---|
| Kakrala towards ? | Northern Railway zone Bathinda–Rajpura line | Kalhe Majra towards ? |
Location
- Interactive map

Nabha railway station is a railway station in located on Bathinda–Rajpura railway line operated by the Northern Railway under Ambala railway division. It is situated at Nabha in Patiala district in the Indian state of Punjab.
