= Sehna, Barnala =

Sehna
- Village
- Location in Punjab, India Sehna (India)
- Coordinates: 30°25′45″N 75°22′53″E
- Country: India
- State: Punjab
- District: Barnala

Population (2023)
  - Total: 22,500

Languages
  - Official: Punjabi
- Time zone: UTC+5:30 (IST)
- PIN: 148103

Sehna is a village at Tapa Tehsil in Barnala district of Punjab, India. It is located 17 km towards west from district headquarters Barnala. 160 km from state capital Chandigarh and 8 km from Bhadaur City. Shaina pin code is 148103 and postal head office is Shaina . Barnala, Bhadaur, Rampura Phul, Raikot, Longowal are the nearby cities to Sehna.

This place is in the border of the Barnala districtistrict and Bathinda district.

== Demographics of Shaina ==
Punjabi is the local language here.

== Transport ==
=== By Rail ===
Ghunas railway station is the nearest railway stations to Sehna.

== Schools near Shaina ==
- Guru Gobind Singh Academy
- Gurudev Public School
- Brilliant Model School
