= Lehra Muhabbat railway station =

Railway station in Punjab, India

Lehra Muhabbat

General information
- Location: Lehra Mohabbat, Bathinda district, Panjab; India
- Coordinates: 30°14′10″N 75°09′46″E
- Elevation: 215 metres (705 ft)
- System: Indian Railways station
- Owner: Indian Railways
- Operator: Northern Railway
- Line: Bathinda–Rajpura line
- Platforms: 2
- Tracks: Double Electric-Line

Construction
- Structure type: Standard (on ground)

Other information
- Status: Functioning
- Station code: LHM
- Zone(s): Northern Railway
- Division(s): Ambala

Services
Preceding station	Indian Railways	Following station
Lahira Khana towards ?	Northern Railway zone Bathinda–Rajpura line	Rampura Phul towards ?
Location
- Interactive map

Lehra Muhabbat railway station is a railway station in located on Bathinda–Rajpura railway line operated by the Northern Railway under Ambala railway division. It is situated at Lehra Mohabbat in Bathinda district in the Indian state of Panjab.
