= Udasi (surname) =

Udasi is a surname. Notable people with the surname include:

- C. M. Udasi (1937–2021), Indian politician
- Sant Ram Udasi (1939–1986), Punjabi poet
- Shivkumar Chanabasappa Udasi (born 1967), Indian politician
