= Kalhe Majra railway station =

Abandoned railway station in Punjab, India

Kalhe Majra

General information
- Location: Kalhe Majra, Patiala district, Punjab; India
- Coordinates: 30°20′09″N 76°12′41″E
- Elevation: 249 metres (817 ft)
- System: Indian Railways station
- Owner: Indian Railways
- Operator: Northern Railway
- Line: Bathinda–Rajpura line
- Tracks: Double Electric-Line

Construction
- Structure type: Standard (on ground)

Other information
- Status: Non Functioning
- Station code: KLMJ
- Zone(s): Northern Railway
- Division(s): Ambala

History
- Closed: Yes

Services
Preceding station	Indian Railways	Following station
Nabha towards ?	Northern Railway zone Bathinda–Rajpura line	Dhablan towards ?
Location
- Interactive map

Kalhe Majra railway station is an abandoned halt railway station in located on Bathinda–Rajpura railway line operated by the Northern Railway under Ambala railway division. It is situated at Kalhe Majra in Patiala district in the Indian state of Punjab.
