= Ghunas railway station =

Railway station in Punjab, India

Ghunas

General information
- Location: Ghunas, Barnala district, Panjab; India
- Coordinates: 30°19′12″N 75°25′14″E
- Elevation: 223 metres (732 ft)
- System: Indian Railways station
- Owner: Indian Railways
- Operator: Northern Railway
- Line: Bathinda–Rajpura line
- Platforms: 2
- Tracks: Double Electric-Line

Construction
- Structure type: Standard (on ground)

Other information
- Status: Functioning
- Station code: GUNS
- Zone(s): Northern Railway
- Division(s): Ambala

Services
Preceding station	Indian Railways	Following station
Tapa towards ?	Northern Railway zone Bathinda–Rajpura line	Hadiyaya towards ?
Location
- Interactive map

Ghunas railway station is a railway station in located on Bathinda–Rajpura railway line operated by the Northern Railway under Ambala railway division. It is situated at Ghunas in Barnala district in the Indian state of Panjab.
