= Kakrala railway station =

Railway station in Punjab, India

Kakrala

General information
- Location: Kakrala, Patiala district, Punjab; India
- Coordinates: 30°22′03″N 76°04′28″E
- Elevation: 254 metres (833 ft)
- System: Indian Railways station
- Owner: Indian Railways
- Operator: Northern Railway
- Line: Bathinda–Rajpura line
- Platforms: 2
- Tracks: Double Electric-Line

Construction
- Structure type: Standard (on ground)

Other information
- Status: Functioning
- Station code: KKRL
- Zone(s): Northern Railway
- Division(s): Ambala

Services
Preceding station	Indian Railways	Following station
Chhintanwala towards ?	Northern Railway zone Bathinda–Rajpura line	Nabha towards ?
Location
- Interactive map

Kakrala railway station is a railway station in located on Bathinda–Rajpura railway line operated by the Northern Railway under Ambala railway division. It is situated at Kakrala in Patiala district in the Indian state of Punjab.
