= Chananwal =

- Village
- Location in Punjab, India Chananwal (India)
- Coordinates: 30.5036°N 75.485°E
- Country: India
- State: Punjab
- District: Barnala

Government
  - Body: Gram panchayat

Languages
  - Official: Punjabi
- Time zone: UTC+5:30 (IST)
- PIN: 148104

Chananwal is a village in the Barnala district of Punjab, India.

The population of Chananwal is predominantly Sikhs from the Jatt community. It can be divided into five pattis (a Punjabi word, which means a group of people from a particular village or area): Barring, Jattanae, Bath, Jangi ki, and Bassi. The village is approximately 400 years old was founded by a group of fifteen families from nearby Bhaini Barring, and today the largest group is the Barring. The wealthiest inhabitants often belong to the Jangiki or Jattane pattis.

Chanawal is about 16km from the district's eponymous capital, Barnala. It is connected to the capital by a road passing through the villages of Thikriwal and Raisar. The village can be reached from Moga via a minibus from Tallewal Canal via Bihla and Bhilli, and from Ludhiana via a minibus from Mahel Kalan via Chinniwal.

There are two fully constructed buildings of worship Gurudwaras, a Hindu temple, and a Mosque. Most of the residents work as farmers. Many of its residents have migrated to Canada, The U.K., and Australia. About 60% of chananwal population is residing in foreign countries. There is a government school and a small hospital most of the progress by Jangike. The majority of the Chanawal sarpanch have been Jangiki. Chananwal is ranked as the fourth-best village in the whole Punjab and the top-ranked village in the district of Barnala.

Three past Sarpanchs are Balwant Singh Gill, Jangir Kaur Barring, and Jaspal Singh Gill. The present Sarpach is Gurjant Singh.
