= Dhablan railway station =

Railway station in Punjab, India

Dhablan
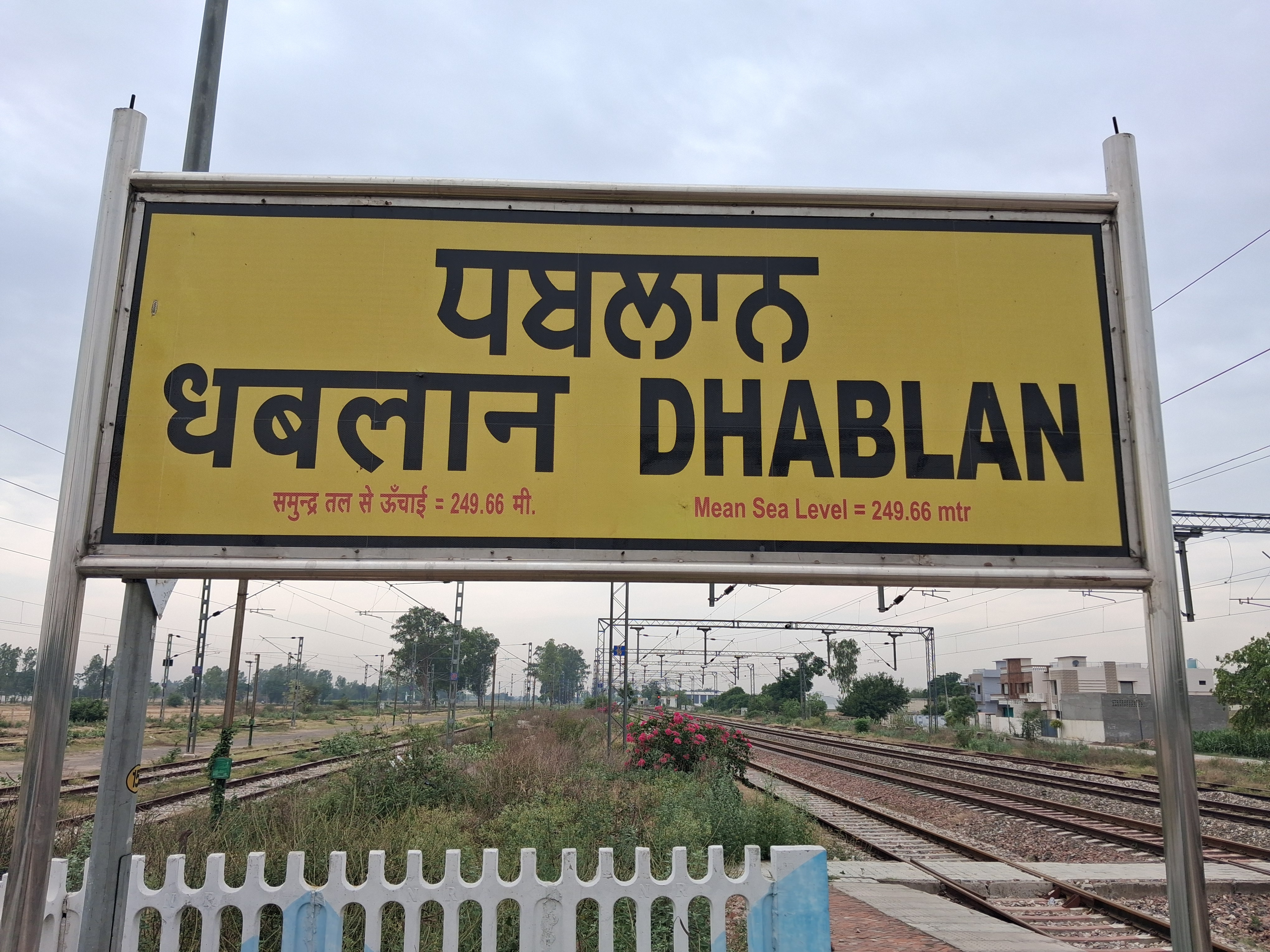

General information
- Location: Dhablan, Patiala district, Punjab; India
- Coordinates: 30°20′16″N 76°16′37″E
- Elevation: 253 metres (830 ft)
- System: Indian Railways station
- Owner: Indian Railways
- Operator: Northern Railway
- Line: Bathinda–Rajpura line
- Platforms: 2
- Tracks: Double Electric-Line

Construction
- Structure type: Standard (on ground)

Other information
- Status: Functioning
- Station code: DBN
- Zone(s): Northern Railway
- Division(s): Ambala

Services
Preceding station	Indian Railways	Following station
Kalhe Majra towards ?	Northern Railway zone Bathinda–Rajpura line	Patiala Cantt towards ?
Location
- Interactive map

Dhablan railway station is a railway station in located on Bathinda–Rajpura railway line operated by the Northern Railway under Ambala railway division. It is situated at Dhablan in Patiala district in the Indian state of Punjab.

== Gallery ==
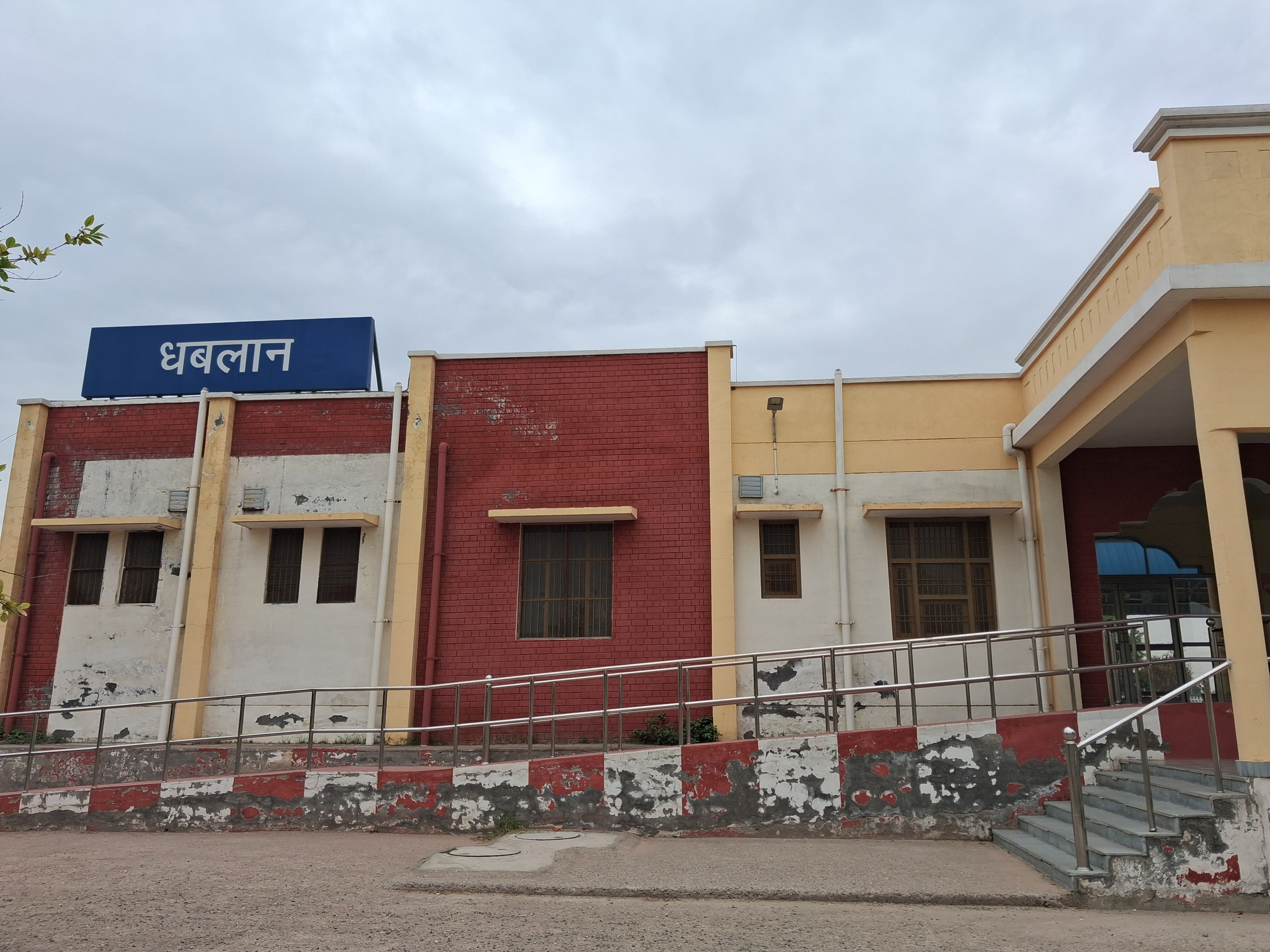
ਧਬਲਾਨ ਰੇਲਵੇ ਸਟੇਸ਼ਨ

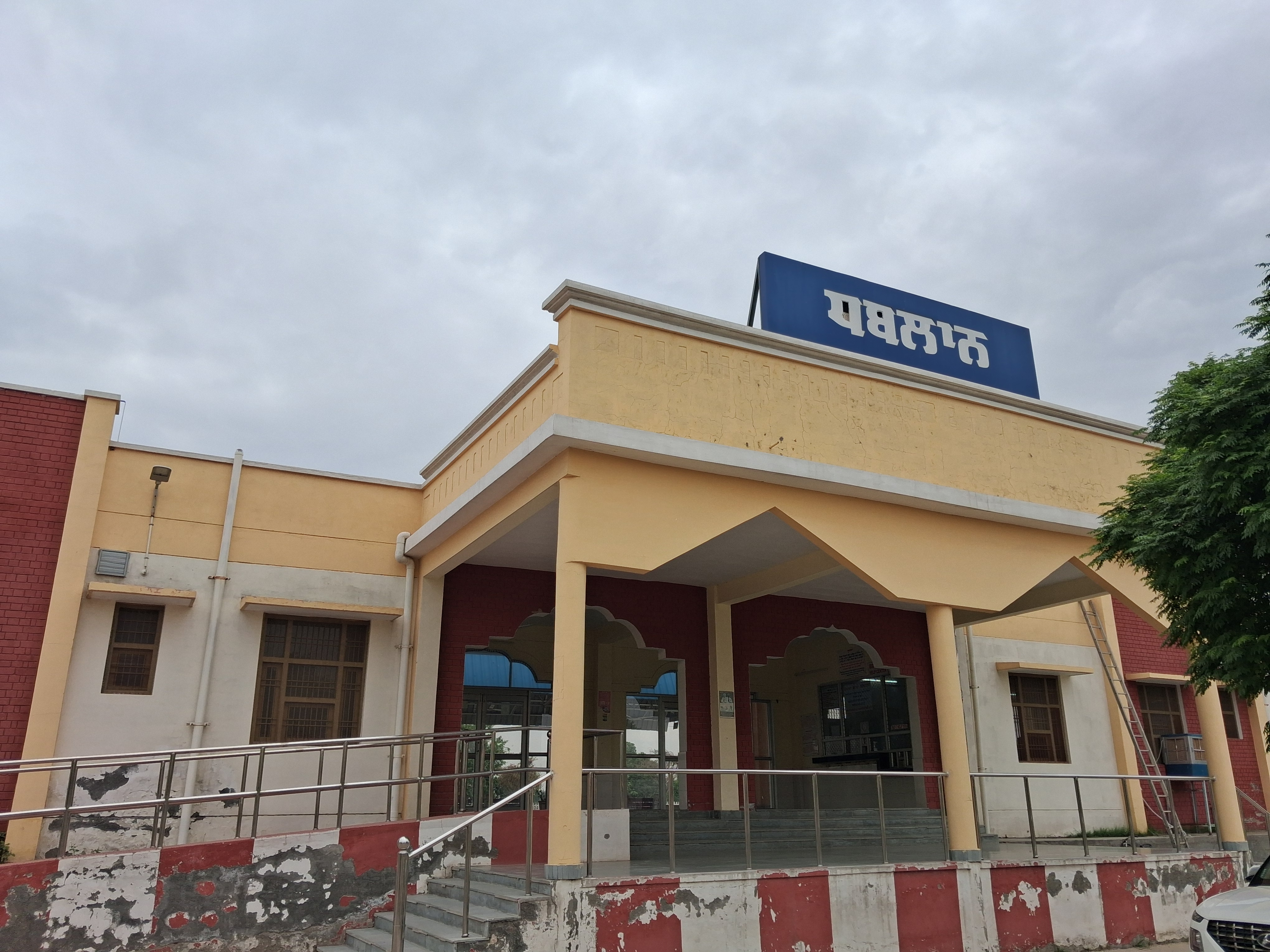
ਇਮਾਰਤ ਧਬਲਾਨ ਰੇਲਵੇ ਸਟੇਸ਼ਨ
