= Alkara =

- village
- Location in Punjab, India
- Coordinates: 30.498736°N 75.297804°E
- Country: India
- State: Punjab
- District: BARNALA

Government
  - Body: Gram panchayat
- Elevation: 219 m (719 ft)

Population (2011)
  - Total: 2,019

Languages
  - Official: Punjabi
- Time zone: UTC+5:30 (IST)
- Postal code: 148102

Alkara is a small village in the Barnala district in the state of Punjab, India. Nearest town is Bhadaur at a distance of 3 km.

== History ==
Alkara is a relatively younger village, it is around 200 years old.

== Geography ==
Alkara is located at 30.498736°N 75.297804°E. It has an average elevation of 219 metres (718 feet). It is at a distance of 4 km from nearest town Bhadaur.

== Demographics ==
As of the 2011 Census of India, Alkara had a population of 2019. Males constitute 53% of the population and females 47%. Alkara has an average literacy rate of 57%, with 56% of the males and 44% of females literate. 10% of the population is under 6 years of age.
