= Kaulseri railway station =

Railway station in Punjab, India

Kaulseri

General information
- Location: Dhuri-Nabha Road, Kaulseri, Sangrur district, Panjab; India
- Coordinates: 30°22′10″N 75°56′29″E
- Elevation: 243 metres (797 ft)
- System: Indian Railways station
- Owner: Indian Railways
- Operator: Northern Railway
- Line: Bathinda–Rajpura line
- Platforms: 2
- Tracks: Double Electric-Line

Construction
- Structure type: Standard (on ground)

Other information
- Status: Functioning
- Station code: KLSX
- Zone(s): Northern Railway
- Division(s): Ambala

Services
Preceding station	Indian Railways	Following station
Dhuri Junction towards ?	Northern Railway zone Bathinda–Rajpura line	Chhintanwala towards ?
Location
- Interactive map

Kaulseri railway station is a railway station in located on Bathinda–Rajpura railway line operated by the Northern Railway under Ambala railway division. It is situated beside Dhuri-Nabha Road at Kaulseri in Sangrur district in the Indian state of Panjab.
