= Chaman Lal Chaman =

Indian-British poet, lyricist and radio broadcaster

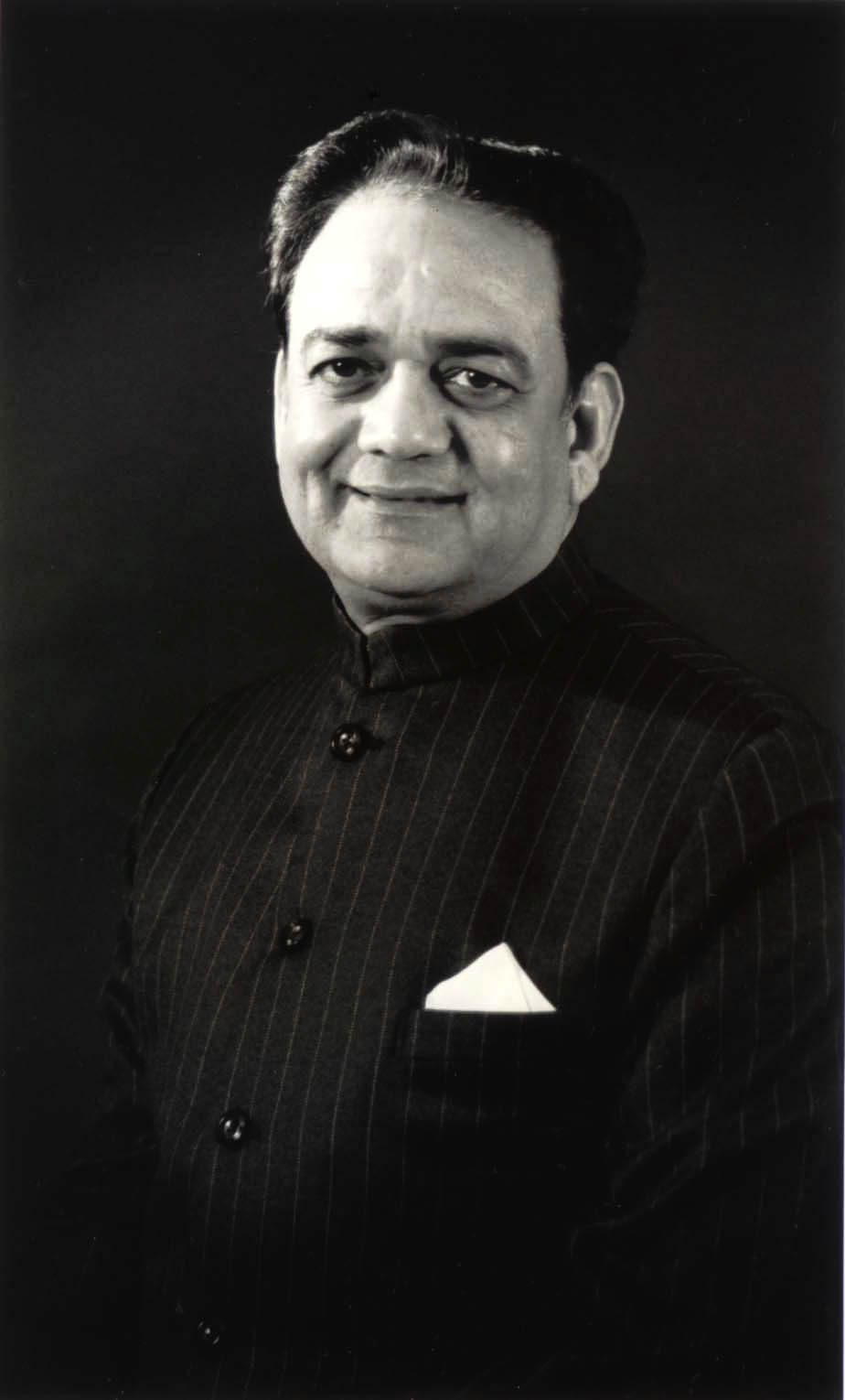
- Born: 15 May 1934; Pasla, British India (now Jalandhar district, India)
- Died: 4 February 2019 (aged 84); London, England
- Citizenship: British
- Occupations: Poet, lyricist
- Writing career
- Language: Panjabi, Urdu, Hindi
- Genres: Panjabi, Filmi
- Subject: Social
- Notable work: saun da mahina (song)

Chaman Lal Chaman (15 May 1934 – 4 February 2019) was an Indian-British Panjabi poet, lyricist and radio broadcaster who was based in London. He was the writer of a popular Panjabi song, saun da mahina, sung by Jagjit Singh in 1979. He wrote in Urdu and Hindi.

Chaman wrote a Bhangra song for Gurinder Chadha's Bride and Prejudice, starring Aishwarya Rai with music by Anu Malik, and many songs and ghazals for Jagjit Singh and his wife Chitra Singh. His lyrics has also been sung by noted Indian singers like Asha Bhosle, Kumar Sanu and Sonu Nigam.

He worked as a radio presenter in Kenya and Britain and interviewed more than a hundred celebrities including, Sunil Dutt, Jawahar Lal Nehru and Naushad.

Chaman was honored in London in 2010 and was presented the Asian Achievers Gold Award for his achievements in media, art and culture.

== Early life and career ==
Chaman was born in a small village in Pasla in 1934. His mother died when he was a child and his father called him to Nairobi.Kenya where he became a presenter on the Kenyan radio station, The Voice of Kenya. He worked there through the 1950s and 1960s, interviewing more than a hundred celebrities, including a noted Bollywood actor Sunil Dutt, when he visited Kenya.

He moved to Britain and lived there from 1956 to 1974, working at the BBC's Asian service and Panjab Radio, UK.

He started the first Indian commercial radio programme in London called Geetmala which became a big hit alamong the Asian diaspora. He also anchored weekly programmes on BBC's TV One and BBC Radio Four during the 1990s.

== Literary works ==
At the age of 13, he wrote a poem on Guru Nanak Dev's birthday and was given rupee 1 as an award which stirred the inner poet in him. He continued to write poems and three anthologies of his poems were published.

On the 50th anniversary of India and Pakistan's independence, he penned a play, Sare Jahan Se Achha, directed by the noted Punjabi writer Balwant Gargi with music composed by ghazal singer, Jagjit Singh. It was a major success in London and other cities of Britain in 1997 and 1998.

== Death ==
Chaman died from a heart condition in London, on 4 February 2019, at the age of 84.

== See also ==
- Balwant Gargi
