= Rampura Phul =

- city
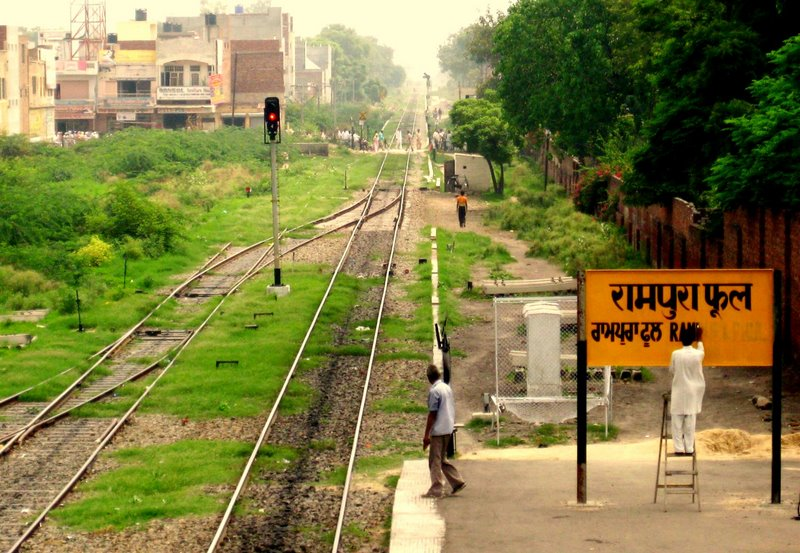
- Rampura Phul railway station Karmu Dass

- Location in Punjab, India
- Coordinates: 30°16′55″N 75°14′35″E
- Country: India
- State: Punjab
- District: Bathinda
- Established: 1680
- Founder: Choudhri Rama (Son of Choudhri Phul)

Area
  - Total: 8.88 km^{2} (3.43 sq mi)

Population (2011)
  - Total: 51,010
  - Density: 5,740/km^{2} (14,900/sq mi)

Languages
  - Official: Punjabi
- Time zone: UTC+5:30 (IST)
- PIN: 151103
- Telephone code: +91 (0)1651
- Vehicle registration: PB-40

Rampura Phul is a city in the Bathinda district in the Indian state of Punjab. Phul Town serves as a Tehsil for villages in nearby area.

== History ==
Phul Village was founded in 1627 AD by Phul, the ancestor of the Phulkian family. His descendants went on to establish the princely states of Jind, Nabha, and Patiala in Punjab, India. Later, in 1680, Phul’s son Rama founded Rampura Village.

Successfully raided the Bhattis and others including Hassan Khan and Muslim chief of Kot. Captured Kot and Bhatîân. Obtained the intendancy of the Jangal tract from Mohameddan Governor of Sirhind. Choudhary Rama Singh founded Rampura in 1680. Rama and Tiloka were baptized with Khande da amrit at the hands of the Tenth Sikh Guru, Guru Gobind Singh at Damdama Sahib. Guru Gobind Singh in a self written Hukamnama addressed to the two sons of Phul, Rama and Tiloka on 2 August 1696 called upon them for help in his fight with the Hill rajas proclaiming “tera ghar mera asey”. Rama and Tiloka later helped Banda Singh Bahādur with men and money in his early exploits (1710–16) Rama was killed at Maler Kotla in 1714.

In British Era this area was part of Nabha State. After 1947, Rampura Phul became part of Barnala District in the Patiala and East Punjab States Union (PEPSU). In 1954, it was moved to Bathinda District in Punjab.

The town is located between the two villages of Rampura and Phul, which is why it is called Rampura Phul.

== Demographics ==
As of the 2001 India census, Rampura Phul urban agglomeration had a population of 51,010. Males constitute 53% of the population and females 47%. Rampura Phul has an average literacy rate of 66%, higher than the national average of 59.5%: male literacy is 70%, and female literacy is 61%. In Rampura Phul, 12% of the population is under 6 years of age.

== Transportation ==
Rampura Phul railway station situated on Bathinda–Rajpura line.
