= Aryabhatta International School =

- AIS

Location
- Nihal Singh Wala Road; Barnala, Punjab; India; 30.3974879°N 75.4543249°E

Information
- Type: Private school
- Established: 2012
- Locale: Barnala, Punjab, India
- Principal: Mrs. Kashish Nagwani
- Campus: 4 acres
- Affiliations: Central Board of Secondary Education, New Delhi
- Website: aryabhattaschool.com

Aryabhatta International School (AIS) came into existence in the year 2012 under the aegis of Aryabhatta Educational and Charitable Society. The school is affiliated to Central Board of Secondary Education (CBSE), New Delhi and offers education up to Senior Secondary classes.

== Teaching methodology ==
The institute follows Continuous and Comprehensive Evaluation (CCE) system of education which is initiated by CBSE Board, New Delhi.

== School facilities ==
The school facilities include:

- Library
- Computer Lab
- First Aid Facility
- Transportation
- Sports
- Water & Power

== Extracurricular activities ==
The students are given training in following subjects:

Sports & outdoor Activities:

- Yoga
- Aerobics
- Badminton
- Gymnastics
- Carrom
- Chess
- Table Tennis
- Gardening
- Environment Club
- Excursions
- Lawn Tennis
- Martial Arts
- Table Soccer

Indoor Activities:

- Quiz
- Debate
- Declamation
- Soft Skill Training
- Project related activities
- Extempore Speech
- Story Telling
- Group Discussions
- Recitation

Creative Activities:

- Dance – Indian Classical, Folk and Western
- Dramatics – Hindi and English
- Music
- Clay Modeling

Events & Celebrations:

- Annual Day
- Sports Day
- Festivals
- Grand Parent's Day
- Independence Day
- Environment Day
- Farewell

== Campus ==
The campus is spread over 4 acres & is located on national highway no 71, 10 km from Barnala city.

== See also ==
- Education in India
- Education in Punjab, India
- List of schools in India
- CBSE
