= Pharwahi =

Pharwahi is a village located in Punjab, in sangrur district,village on National Highway 64. It is the first upcoming village on Barnala-Baaliyan-Sangrur road. The approximate distance from Barnala to Pharwahi is about five km. People are mostly related to Sikhism, but there are the people related to almost all religions.

== History ==
Pharwahi is a historical village which is mostly related to Sikhism. As according to historical stories, the ninth Guru of Sikhs Shri Guru Teg Bahadur ji has arrived here in 16** A.D. during their journey. When they came, the people of the village were suffering from an epidemic of ***.

They blessed the people and asked them to make a pond and predicted that the one who will take a holy dip in the water with a clean heart will be free of any type of mental and physical disease. Within no time, the people of Pharwahi overcame the epidemic and this story was spread in the nearer villages as forest fire. People started coming from other villages to bathe in the pond.

Now at that place a Gurudwara had been built and it is widely known as Guruduwara Naowi Patshahi Sahib. It has been driven by the Shiromni Guruduwara Prabandhak Committee.

== Demographics ==
Particulars	Total	Male	Female
Total No. Of Houses	955		
Population	5,047	2,700	2,347
Child (0-6)	567	315	252
Schedule Caste	2,229	1,175	1,054
Schedule Tribe	0	0	0
Literacy	64.22%	68.22%	59.67%
Total Workers	1,565	1,443	122
Main Workers	1,438	0	0
Marginal Workers	127	0	0

Table; Census 2011, Data Of Pharwahi, Barnala (Punjab)

== Administration ==
The village is administered by a 10 membered committee, a group of 9 Panches and one Sarpanch. These are all elected by the people through direct elections. The last elections were held on 3 July 2019, and Shri Malkiat Singh Meeta was elected as Sarpanch. Nine other people were elected as panches. The names and details of the administration committee are given below.

Sarpanch:

- Shri Malkiat Singh Meeta w/o Sardar Harwinder Singh (general category)

Panches:

1. Darshan Singh Deol (Gen)
2. Jaswant Singh (Gen)
3. Proshotam Singh (Gen)
4. Darshan Singh Mahant (SC)
5. Gora Singh (SC)
6. Kaka Singh (SC)
7. Sukhwinder Kaur (SC)
