= Ram Sarup Ankhi =

Indian writer, poet, and novelist

- Born: Ram Sarup; 28 August 1932; Dhaula, Punjab Province, British India
- Died: 14 February 2010 (aged 77); Barnala, Punjab, India
- Occupations: Writer, Novelist, Poet
- Known for: Partapi, Kothe Kharak Singh

Ram Sarup Ankhi (28 August 1932 – 14 February 2010) was an Indian writer, poet, and novelist who wrote in Punjabi. He started as a poet but ended up as a fiction writer. He was awarded the Sahitya Akademi Award by the Sahitya Akademi, India's National Academy of Letters in 1987 for his novel Kothe Kharak Singh.

== Life ==
Ankhi was born on 28 August 1932, in the village of Dhaula in Barnala district of Indian Punjab. After completing his education from Government Mohindra College, Patiala, Ankhi continued with his ancestral profession of farming. Later, he served as an English teacher in a government school, but wrote in Punjabi language. He died on 13 February 2010, and he was survived by his wife, three daughters and two sons. One daughter pre-deceased him Three of his wives died, and he later married a lady who spoke only broken Punjabi, leading everyone to conclude that his fourth wife was from outside Punjab, but from another Indian province.

== Career ==
He started his career as a poet but ended as fiction writer. There are 15 novels, eight-story-books and five poem collections to his credit. He mostly wrote about the village life of Punjab; about farmer suicide and indebtedness and drug addiction etc. His well-known works include Kothe Kharak Singh (1985), Partapi (1993), Dulle Di Dhab (2003), Salphas, Kanak Da Qatleam. Malhe Jharhian (1988) and Apni Mitti De Rukh (2004) are both autobiographies. The scene of most of his writings are a cluster of 50 villages in the Malwa region, from the districts of Mansa, Bathinda, Barnala, and Sangrur.

== Awards ==
He received the Sahitya Akademi Award given by Sahitya Akademi, India's National Academy of Letters in 1987 for his novel Kothe Kharak Singh, which was a story of three generations based on a fictional village in Punjab. He received many more including, Kartar Singh Dhaliwal award of 1992 from Panjabi Sahit Akademi, Ludhiana and Sarb Shresht Sahitkaar award in 2009.

== Notable books ==
Stories

Many of his books and short stories have been adapted into films. His novel Gelo was made into a Punjabi feature film directed by Manbhawan Singh in 2016.

- Sutta Naag (1966)
- Kachcha Dhaga (1967)
- Manukh Di Maut (1968)
- Teesi Da Ber (1970)
- Khaara Duddh (1973)
- Adha Admi (1977)
- Gelo
- Kadon Phirange Din (1985)
- Kidhar Jaawan (1992)
- Chhad Ke Na Ja (1994)

Novels

- Kothe Kharak Singh (1985)
- Partapi (1993)
- Dulle Di Dhab (2003)
- Kaidan
- Zameena Wale
- Kanka Da Katlaam
- Pind Di Mitti

Autobiographies

- Malhe Jharhian (1988)
- Apni Mitti De Rukh (2004)
