= Malkit Singh Keetu =

Indian politician

MLA, Punjab
- In office 1997-2007
- Preceded by: Som Dutt
- Succeeded by: Kewal Singh Dhillon
- Constituency: Barnala

Personal details
- Died: 29 October 2012 Bilaspur, Moga district
- Party: Shiromani Akali Dal
- Children: Kulwant Singh Keetu
- Nickname: Pardhan Ji

Malkit Singh Keetu was an Indian politician, and a member of Shiromani Akali Dal. He served as member of legislative assembly from Barnala twice (1997, 2002). On 29 October 2012, Keetu was murdered at age of 65 in a family feud.
