= Bhadaur =

- Town
- Location in Punjab, India
- Coordinates: 30°28′35″N 75°19′50″E
- Country: India
- State: Punjab
- District: Barnala
- Elevation: 219 m (719 ft)

Population (2011)
  - Total: 18,561

Languages
  - Official: Punjabi
- Time zone: UTC+5:30 (IST)

Bhadaur is a town in Barnala district in the state of Punjab, India. It is part of the Bhadaur Assembly Constituency.

The city of Bhadaur, home to the legendary Phoolka Sirdars, is in the Barnala district of Punjab. It is located about 25 km northwest of Barnala and is an important historical town in the state.

Bhadaur shares its borders with several villages, including Alkara, Kharak Singhwala, Talwandi, Jangiana, Majhuke, Deepgarh, Nainewala, Sandhu Kalan, and Chhanna Gulab Singh Wala. The city features many religious sites and architectural landmarks, such as Bhadaur Fort.

Bhadaur is popular not only among locals but also attracts visitors. It is well connected to key locations in Punjab through road and rail. Here are the main features of Bhadaur city in Barnala.

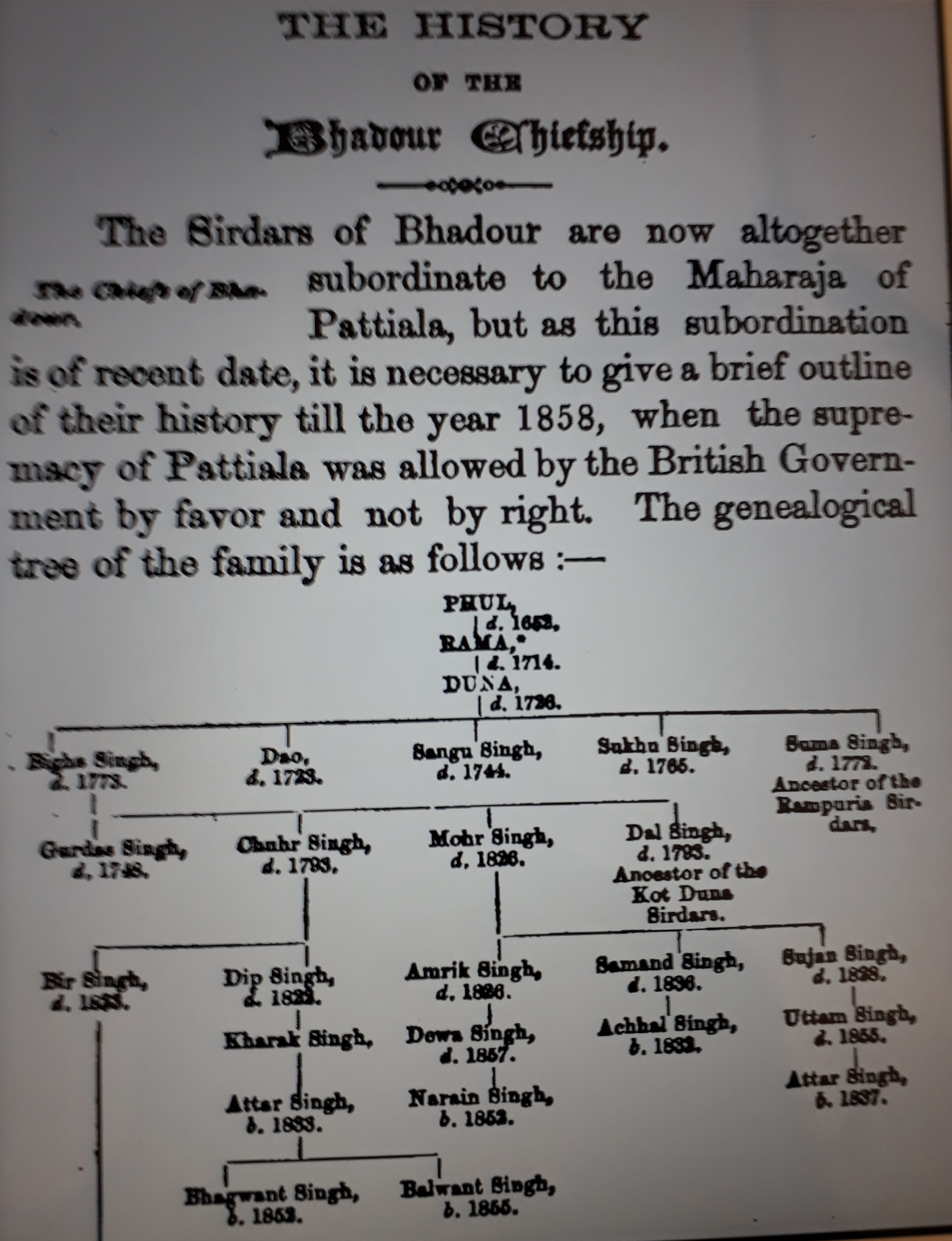
Genecological tree of Bhadaur Chiefs

Bhadaur was an independent princely state till 1857, then it was brought under subordination of Patiala by British Govt by a favour not by right. ,

Bhadaur is the first joint capital of Phūlkian dynasty founded by Rama 2nd son of Phul. The princely state of Patiala, is rooted to Bhadaur. The family is Sidhu Jat. Descendants of Chaudhary Phool settled here after conquering the area from Muslim invaders, leaving the village of Mehraj, Phul and Dhipali. Ram Singh the son of Chaudhary Phool established the house of Bhadaur for his sons Dunna Singh elder and Ala Singh younger (First Maharaja of Patiala). After spending 17 years in joint family at Bhadaur Ala Singh moved to Barnala then founded the city of Patiala and became first ruler of Patiala Kingdom and Bhadaur state was left to his elder brother Dunna Singh, whose descendants still lives at Bhadaur.

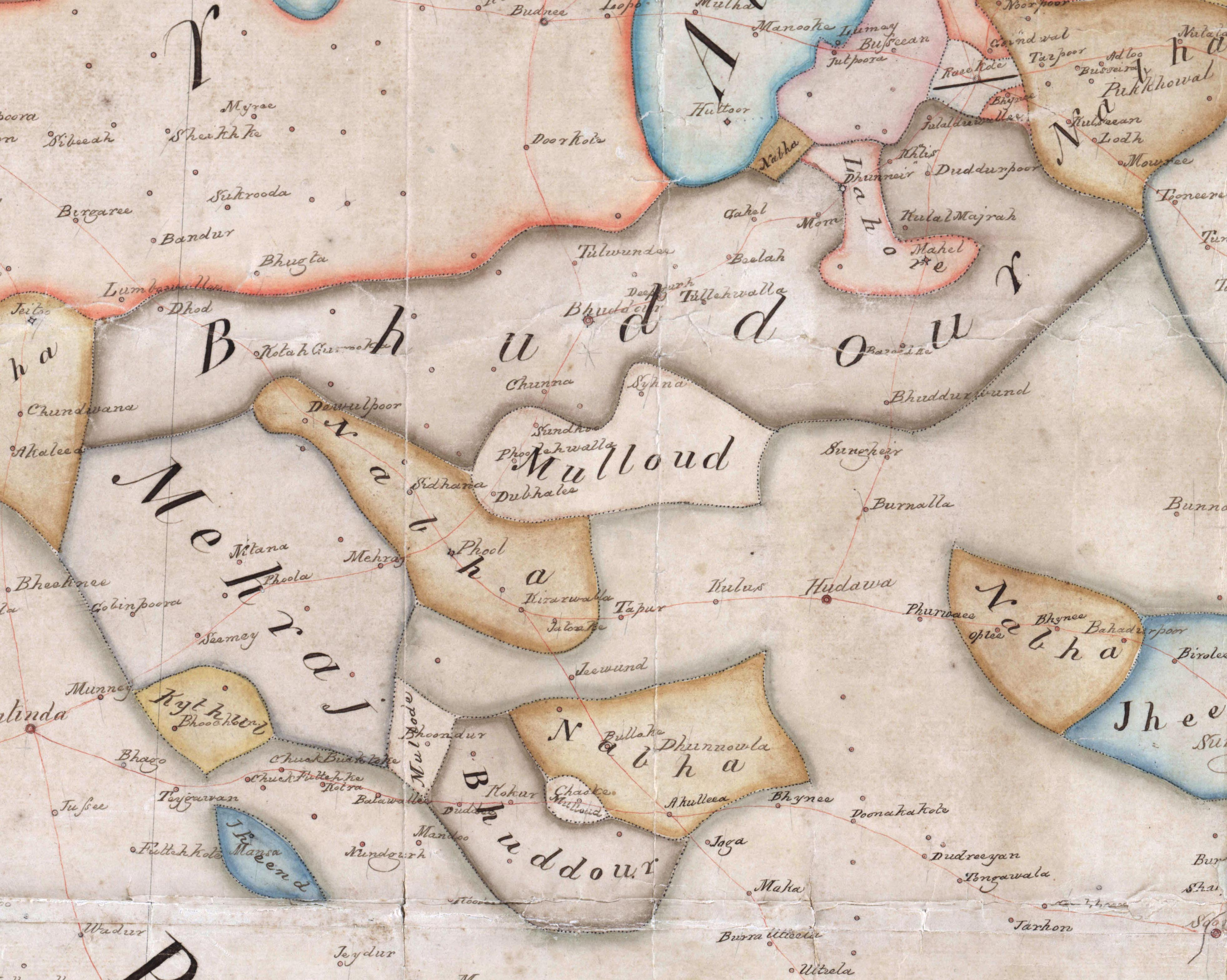
Detail of the main tracts of territory of Bhadaur State from a map created by the British East India Company, ca.1829–1835.

Bhadaur was the only princely town where the royal family held eight residential forts individually. Bhadaur is home to the Phūlkian Sardars, who own and rule 84 villages. Most of the lands in and around Bhadaur belong to them. The royals of the House of Bhadaur are known as Bhadaurias and Bhadauriye Sardar. Tales about the Bhadaurian ruler Chuhr Singh appear in Richard Carnac Temple's The legends of the Punjab.

Bhadaur features the Sheetla Mata Temple and the 11-Rudra (11 rudras together are rare) Shivaist temple Pathran Wali. There are brass pipelines connected to the temple from all the Phūlkian forts to offer pure ghee for jyot (holy fire).

== Bhadaur fort ==
The Bhadaur fort stands in the middle of Bhadaur. It was built around 1693 AD by Rāma Singh, son of Phūl and is now privately owned by Harpreetinder Singh Phoolka alias Hapie Phoolka S/o Late S. Kuldeepinder Singh Rais of Bhadaur, making it one of few private forts in Punjab.

The fort is the tallest building in the area. It is made from Bhadauri itt (small bricks). The walls of the rooms are 6 ft deep so it remains cool in summers and warm in winters. This fort staged many historical events:

- Akali Phoola Singh sheltered here before being sent to Maharaja Ranjit Singh, who then became a famous general of the Sikh Empire.
- Annexion meetings of the Cis-Sutlej States by the British East India Company.
- The discussion between the British and Attar Singh Sahib of Bhadaur, whether Maharaja Dalip Singh should be allowed to visit India.
- Revolt of 1857.
- War with Marathas when they invaded Patiala. Chuhar Singh Bhadauria was chief in command of an expedition against the Marathas, repulsing them from Bahadurgarh.
- Invasion on Malerkotla Afghans whose 66 villages were seized by Sardars from Bhadaur.
- Battle of Barnala.
- Marriage of Bibi Attar Kaur of Bhadaur with Prince Naunihal Singh Of Lahore, grandson of Maharaja Ranjit Singh.
- Sardar Harjang Singh sheltered Muslim refugees here in the 1947 riots.

== Demographics ==
As of 2001 India census, Bhadaur had a population of 16,818. Males constitute 53% of the population and females 47%. Bhadaur has an average literacy rate of 50%, of which 57% are male and 43% are female. 13% of the population is under 6 years of age. In the recent Punjab Assembly Elections, Pirmal Singh Dhaula, an Aam Aadmi Party candidate, grabbed the seat.

The table below shows the population of different religious groups in Bhadaur city, as of 2011 census.

Population by religious groups in Bhadaur city, 2011 census
Religion	Total	Female	Male
Sikh	13,829	6,498	7,331
Hindu	3,856	1,825	2,031
Muslim	682	313	369
Christian	101	49	52
Jain	24	9	15
Other religions	38	15	23
Not stated	31	16	15
Total	18,561	8,725	9,836

== Villages near Bhadaur ==
- Alkara
- Kharak Singhwala (Bihli)
- Talwandi
- Jangiana
- Chhanna Gulab Singh Wala
- Nainewala
- Sandhu Kalan
- Ramgarh
- Majhuke
- Deepgarh
- Sehna
- Vidhate
- Salabatpura

== See also ==
- Phulkian sardars
- Patiala State
- Nabha State
- Jind State
- Faridkot State
- Malaudh
- Kaithal
- Cis-Sutlej states
