= Barnala Assembly constituency =

Legislative Assembly constituency in Punjab State, India

Coordinates: 30.37°N 75.54°E

Barnala
- Constituency No. 103 for the Punjab Legislative Assembly

Constituency details
- Country: India
- State: Punjab
- District: Barnala
- Lok Sabha constituency: Sangrur
- Total electors: 182,502 (in 2022)
- Reservation: None

Member of Legislative Assembly
- 16th Punjab Legislative Assembly
- Incumbent Kuldeep Singh Dhillon
- Party: Indian National Congress
- Elected year: 2024 by-election

Barnala Assembly constituency (Sl. No.: 103) is a Punjab Legislative Assembly constituency in Barnala district, Punjab state, India.

== Members of the Legislative Assembly ==
Most successful parties from Barnala Vidhan Sabha
1. SAD (8 Times) (42.1%)
2. INC (7 Times) (36.8%)
3. AAP (2 Times) (10.5%)
4. AD – SFS (1 Time) (5.26%)
5. IND (1 Time) (5.26%)

Year	Member	Party
As part of PEPSU Legislative Assembly (1951–56)
1952	Raghbir Prakash	Indian National Congress
1954	Kartar Singh	Shiromani Akali Dal
As part of Punjab Legislative Assembly (1956–Present)
1957	Kartar Singh	Indian National Congress
1962	Gurbakshish Singh	Shiromani Akali Dal
1965^	S. Singh	Indian National Congress
1967	Surjit Singh Barnala	Akali Dal – Sant Fateh Singh Group
1969	Surjit Singh Barnala	Shiromani Akali Dal
1972	Surjit Singh Barnala	Shiromani Akali Dal
1977	Surjit Kaur Barnala	Shiromani Akali Dal
1980	Surjit Singh Barnala	Shiromani Akali Dal
1985	Surjit Singh Barnala	Shiromani Akali Dal
1992	Som Dutt	Indian National Congress
1997	Malkit Singh Keetu	Independent
2002	Malkit Singh Keetu	Shiromani Akali Dal
2007	Kewal Singh Dhillon	Indian National Congress
2012	Kewal Singh Dhillon	Indian National Congress
2017	Gurmeet Singh Meet Hayer	Aam Aadmi Party
2022	Gurmeet Singh Meet Hayer	Aam Aadmi Party
2024^	Kuldeep Singh Dhillon	Indian National Congress

^By-poll

== Election results ==
=== 2027 ===
Punjab Assembly election, 2027: Barnala
Party	Candidate	Votes	%	±%
AAP	Gurmeet Singh Meet Hayer			
INC	Kuldeep Singh Dhillon			
BJP	Kewal Singh Dhillon			
BSP				
AD (WPD)				New entry
SAD				New entry
NOTA	None of the above			
Majority				
Turnout				

=== 2024 by-election ===
Punjab Legislative Assembly by-election 2024: Barnala
Party	Candidate	Votes	%	±%
INC	Kuldeep Singh Dhillon	28,254	28.24	▲15.43
AAP	Harinder Singh Dhaliwal	26,097	26.09	▼23.18
BJP	Kewal Singh Dhillon	17,958	17.95	▲11.01
IND	Gurdeep Bathh	16,899	16.89	New
SAD(A)	Govind Singh Sandhu	7,900	7.90	
NOTA	None of the above	618		
Majority		2,157		
Turnout		1,00,042	56.34	▼15.47
INC gain from AAP		Swing		

=== 2022 ===
Assembly election, 2022: Barnala
Party	Candidate	Votes	%	±%
AAP	Gurmeet Singh Meet Hayer	64,800	49.27	▲13.78
SAD	Kulwant Singh Keetu	27,178	20.66	▼2.53
INC	Manish Bansal	16,853	12.81	▼20.86
SAD(A)	Gurpreet Singh	9,917	7.54	▲3.77
BJP	Dhiraj Kumar	9,122	6.94	New
NOTA	None of the above	855	0.65	
Majority		37,622	28.61	
Turnout		131,532	71.81	
Registered electors		182,502		
AAP hold				

=== 2017 ===
Assembly election, 2017: Barnala
Party	Candidate	Votes	%	±%
AAP	Gurmeet Singh Meet Hayer	47,606	35.49	
INC	Kewal Singh Dhillon	45,174	33.67	
SAD	Surinder Pal Singh Sibia	31,111	23.19	
SAD(A)	Simranjit Singh Mann	5,061	3.77	
BSP	Paramjit Kaur	2,369	1.77	
NOTA	None of the above	889	0.66	
Registered electors		171,962		
AAP gain from INC				

=== Previous Results ===
Year	A C No.	Name	Party	Votes	Runner Up	Party	Votes
2012	103	Kewal Singh Dhillon	INC	54570	Malkit Singh Keetu	SAD	49048
2007	82	Kewal Singh Dhillon	INC	58723	Malkit Singh Keetu	SAD	57359
2002	83	Malkit Singh Keetu	SAD	37575	Surinder Pal Singh	INC	21305
1997	83	Malkiat Singh Keetu	IND	41819	Rajinder Kaur	SAD	18105
1992	83	Som Dutt	INC	4289	Malkit Singh	SAD	3473
1985	83	Surjit Singh	SAD	31152	Hardeep Kumar	INC	20540
1980	83	Surjit Singh	SAD	30289	Narinder Singh	INC (I)	26979
1977	83	Surjit Kaur	SAD	26250	Som Dutt	INC	18395
1972	89	Surjit Singh	SAD	30152	Onkar Chand	INC	18849
1969	89	Surjeet Singh	SAD	25442	Gurcharan Singh	INC	22657
1967	89	S. Singh	ADS	24271	R. Singh	INC	10119
1965	By Polls	S. Singh	INC	29820	A. Sarup	IND	12296
1962	150	Gurbakshish Singh	AD	26882	Sampuran Singh	INC	24789
1957	113	Kartar Singh	INC	16027	Gurbakshish Singh	IND	15608

== See also ==
- List of constituencies of the Punjab Legislative Assembly
- Barnala district
