= Kothe Kharak Singh =

1985 book by Ram Sarup Ankhi

Kothe Khrak Singh
- Author: Ram Sarup Ankhi
- Original title: ਕੋਠੇ ਖੜਕ ਸਿੰਘ
- Language: Punjabi
- Genre: Novel
- Set in: Punjab
- Published: 1985
- Publication place: India
- Awards: Sahitya Akademi (1987)

Kothe Kharak Singh (Punjabi: ਕੋਠੇ ਖੜਕ ਸਿੰਘ) or Kothe Kharak Singh: a story of three generations (1985) is a Punjabi-language novel written by Ram Sarup Ankhi. The novel is considered as Ankhi's best literary work and for this work he received Sahitya Akademi award in 1987.

== Plot ==
Kothe Kharak Singh is a political novel and the main events of the plot take place in a village in Punjab. The novel presents three generations and narrates the struggle for Indian independence before the partition of the Punjab. It also describes the socio-economic and cultural changes the state was witnessing at that time.

== Theme ==
The socio-cultural environment before Indian independence and lifestyle of common people are the major theme of this novel. The story and its writing style is influenced by Russian literature and fiction, translations of which were easily available in Punjab at that time.

== Publication ==
The novel first published in 1985. For this novel Ram Sarup Ankhi received Sahitya Akademi award in 1987. The novel has been translated into 10 languages. The work was translated into English by Avtar Singh Judge.
