= Kewal Singh Dhillon =

Indian politician (born 1950)

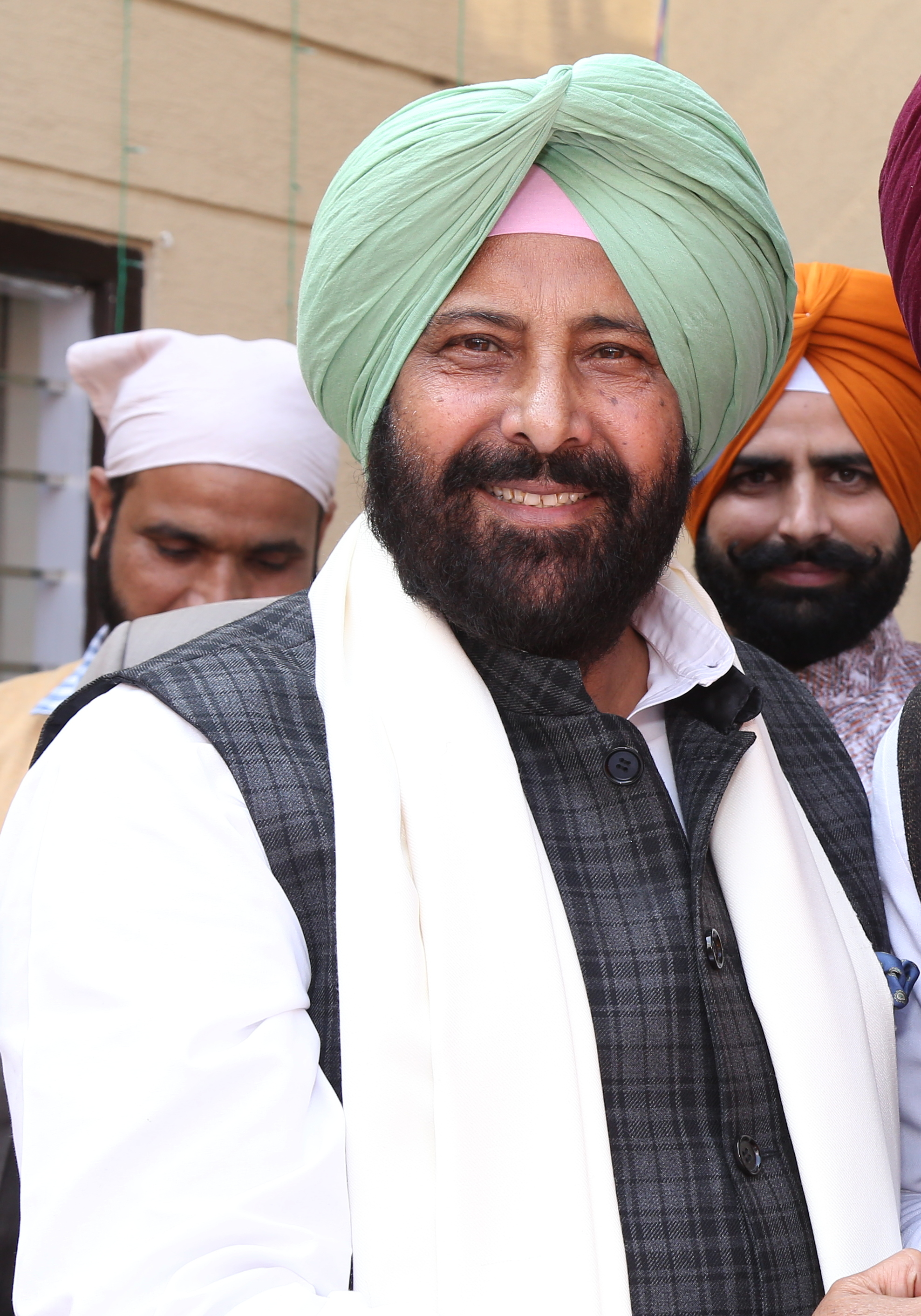
- Dhillon in 2019

President of Bharatiya Janata Party, Punjab
- Incumbent
- Assumed office 3 June 2026
- President: Nitin Nabin
- Preceded by: Sunil Jakhar

Member of the Punjab Legislative Assembly
- In office 27 February 2007 – 11 March 2017
- Preceded by: Malkit Keetu
- Succeeded by: Meet Hayer
- Constituency: Barnala

Personal details
- Born: 16 May 1950 (age 76) Barnala, India
- Party: Bharatiya Janata Party (2022–present)
- Other political affiliations: Indian National Congress (2007–2022)

Kewal Singh Dhillon (born 16 May 1950) is an Indian politician from Punjab. He is a member of Bharatiya Janata Party since June 2022. He was an MLA from Barnala till 2017, when he was defeated by Meet Hayer of Aam Aadmi Party.

== Early life and education ==
Dhillon was born in the village of Tallewal, Barnala. He got his preliminary education in Barnala and was also brought up there.

== Career ==
=== Congress ===
He was also senior vice-president of Punjab Pradesh Congress Committee (PPCC), who was a member of the Punjab Legislative Assembly (2012–17) for the constituency of Barnala representing the INC and also contested from Sangrur unsuccessfully in the 2019 Indian general election. In both these elections he lost to Meet Hayer of Aam Aadmi Party.

=== Bharatiya Janta Party ===
He joined Bharatiya Janata Party on 4 June 2022 along with Raj Kumar Verka, Balbir Singh Sidhu, Gurpreet Singh Kangar, Sunder Sham Arora, and others at the party office in Chandigarh.

== Electoral performance ==
Assembly election, 2017: Barnala
Party	Candidate	Votes	%	±%
AAP	Gurmeet Singh Meet Hayer	47,606	35.49	
INC	Kewal Singh Dhillon	45,174	33.67	
SAD	Surinder Pal Singh Sibia	31,111	23.19	
SAD(A)	Simranjit Singh Mann	5,061	3.77	
BSP	Paramjit Kaur	2,369	1.77	
NOTA	None of the above	889	0.66	
Registered electors		171,962		
AAP gain from INC				

General Election 2019: Sangrur
Party	Candidate	Votes	%	±%
AAP	Bhagwant Mann	413,561	37.40	▼11.07
INC	Kewal Singh Dhillon	303,350	27.43	▲9.93
SAD	Parminder Singh Dhindsa	263,498	23.83	▼5.40
SAD(A)	Simranjit Singh Mann	48,365	4.37	
LIP	Jasraj Singh Longia	20,087	1.82	
NOTA	None of the Above	6,490	0.59	▲0.39
Majority		110,211	9.97	▼10.46
Turnout		1,107,256	72.40	
AAP hold		Swing	▼10.5	

2022 By-election: Sangrur
Party	Candidate	Votes	%	±%
SAD(A)	Simranjit Singh Mann	253,154	35.61	▲31.24
AAP	Gurmail Singh	247,332	34.79	▼2.61
INC	Dalvir Singh Goldy	79,668	11.21	▼16.22
BJP	Kewal Singh Dhillon	66,298	9.33	New
SAD	Bibi Kamaldeep Kaur Rajoana	44,428	6.25	▼17.58
NOTA	None of the Above	2471	0.35	
Majority		6,245	0.88	
Turnout		7,10,919	45.3%	▼27.1
Registered electors		15,69,240		
SAD(A) gain from AAP		Swing	▲16.92	

Punjab Legislative Assembly by-election 2024: Barnala
Party	Candidate	Votes	%	±%
INC	Kuldeep Singh Dhillon	28,254	28.24	▲15.43
AAP	Harinder Singh Dhaliwal	26,097	26.09	▼23.18
BJP	Kewal Singh Dhillon	17,958	17.95	▲11.01
Independent	Gurdeep Bathh	16,899	16.89	New
SAD(A)	Govind Singh Sandhu	7,900	7.90	
NOTA	None of the above	618		
Majority		2,157		
Turnout		1,00,042	56.34	▼15.47
INC gain from AAP		Swing		
