= Balwant Gargi =

Indian dramatist and theatre director (1916 – 2003)

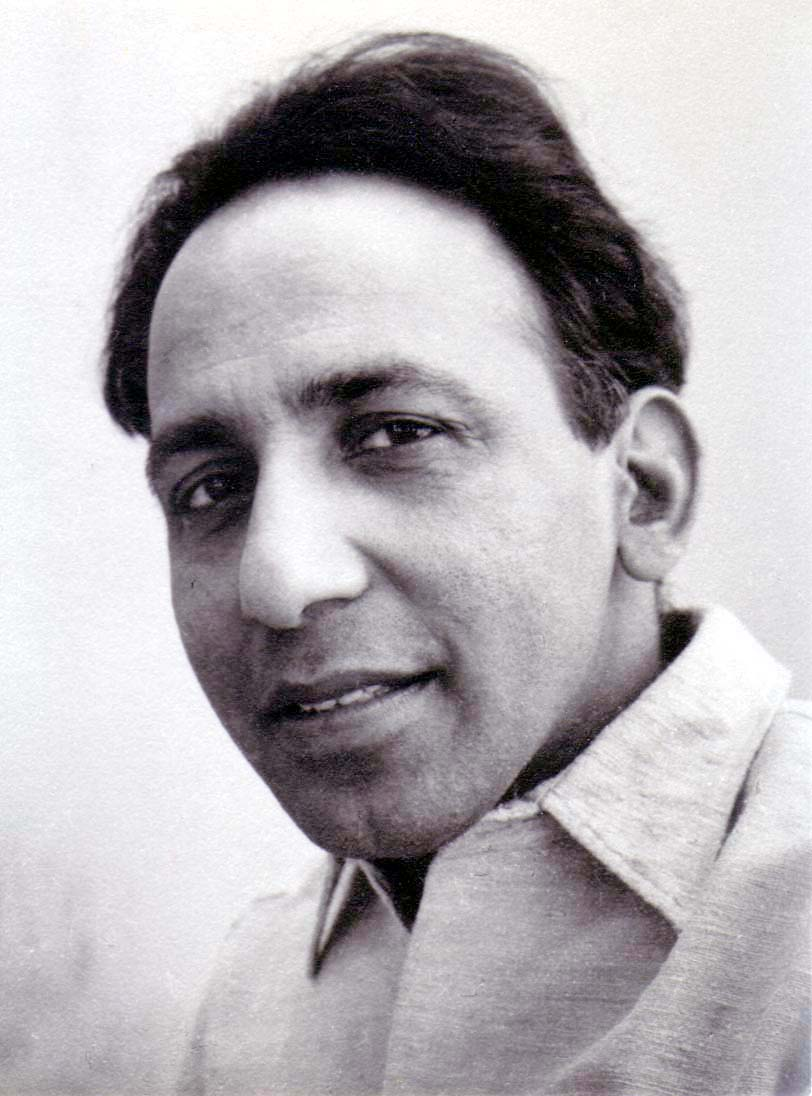
- Gargi, Amritsar. 1958.
- Born: 4 December 1916; Sehna, Barnala (Punjab)
- Died: 21 April 2003 (aged 86); Mumbai, India
- Occupations: Writer, Theatre Director
- Awards: Sahitya Akademi Award (1962); Padma Shri (1972); Sangeet Natan Akademi Award (1998)

Balwant Gargi (4 December 1916 – 21 April 2003) was an Indian Punjabi language dramatist, theatre director, novelist, short story writer, and academic.

== Early life ==
On 4 December 1916, in Canal House in Sehna, Barnala (Punjab), Balwant Gargi was born in a house near the Sirhind Canal, famous for being the spot where Razia Sultana was imprisoned. The second son in the family of Shiv Chand Garg, a head clerk in the Irrigation Department, he would go on create history in the world of Indian and Punjabi literature.

Gargi studied at Government College Lahore, and completed his M.A.(English) and M.A.(Political Science) from FC College in Lahore. He also studied theatre with Norah Richards at her school in Kangra Valley.

== Plays ==
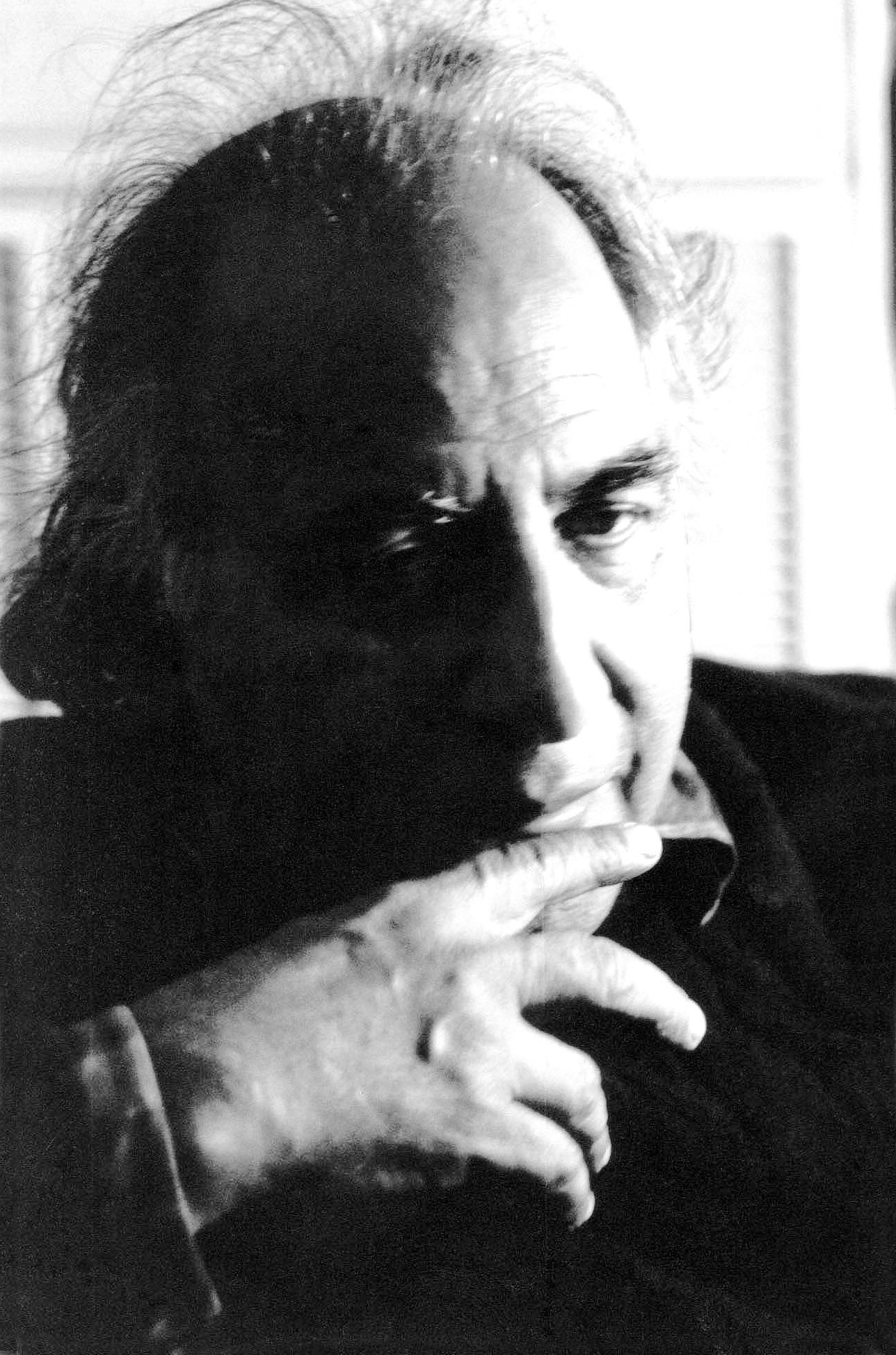
Balwant Gargi. New Delhi. 1992

Gargi wrote several plays, including Loha Kutt, Kesro, Kanak Di Balli, Sohni Mahiwal, Sultan Razia, Soukan, Mirza Sahiba and Dhooni di Agg and short stories Mircha Wala Sadh, Pattan di Berhi and Kuari Disi. His plays were translated into 12 languages, and have been performed around the world, including Moscow, London, New Delhi and around the United States.

Gargi's first play, Loha kutt (English: Blacksmith) in 1944 became controversial for its stark picture of the Punjab countryside. At that juncture, he focused on poverty, illiteracy, ignorance, and superstition marking rural life, which continued in Saelpathar (English: Petrified Stone) in 1949, Navan mudh (English: New Beginning) in 1950, and Ghugi (English: Dove) in 1950. In the 1950 edition of Loha kutt, he resorted to drawing poetic and dramatic elements from J. M. Synge and Garcia Lorca. In subsequent works like Kanak di balli (English: Stalk of Wheat) in 1968 and Dhuni di agg (English: Fire in the Furnace) in 1977, these became his chief vehicles. For all the specificity of native locale, the former deflected as much towards Lorca's Blood Wedding as the latter reminded one of Yerma. In Mirza-Sahiban in 1976, customs and conventions came in for bitter censure. Gradually, Gargi's preoccupation with sex, violence, and death became almost an obsession. Antonin Artaud`s theatre of cruelty grew into his categorical imperative. This required his dramaturgy to proceed through mythopoeia, which turns explicit in his last plays.

In Saunkan (English: Rival Women) in 1979, the paradigm of Yama-Yami, the Hindu god of death and his twin sister, becomes an occasion to glorify sexual union. Altogether dispensing with socio-political discourse, he turned to his new theme with a vengeance in Abhisarka (English: Lover) in 1990. Gargi's penchant for the unexpected grew all-powerful.

For subject matter Gargi moved freely over social milieu, mythology, history, and folklore. For form and technique he relied as much upon Sanskrit classics as on Lorca's poetic drama, Brecht's epic theatre, or Artaud's theatre of cruelty. In the composition and performance of his dozen full-length plays and five collections of one-act drama, he traveled from the realistic to the mythopoeic mode.

== Books and novels ==
In addition to this dramatic corpus, Gargi's short stories began to be published in English. A book, Folk Theatre of India, published in New York City and two semi-autobiographical novels in English and Punjabi, The Naked Triangle (Nangi Dhup) and The Purple Moonlight (Kashni Vehra) brought him to the forefront of cosmopolitan attention.

Balwant Gargi was among the pioneers of playwriting in Punjabi and the production and telecast of his plays like Sanjha Chulha on Doordarshan received countrywide appreciation

== Awards ==
Gargi was awarded the Sahitya Akademi award, the highest Indian literary award, in 1962 for his book Rang Manch. This was followed by the Padma Shri (1972), and the Sangeet Natak Akademi Award in Punjabi Playwriting in 1998. Gargi is one of the few artists to win both the Sahitya Akademi and Sangeet Natak Akademi awards.

== Theatre and teaching ==
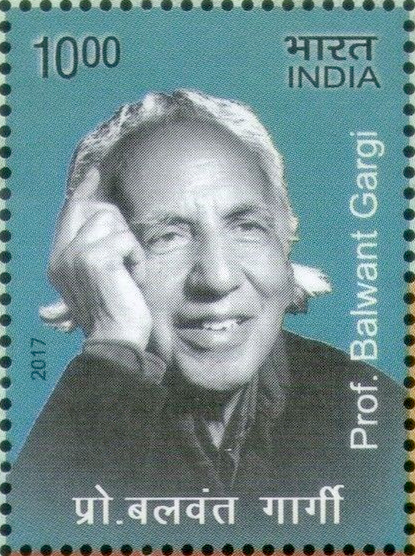
Balwant Gargi 2017 stamp of India

Balwant Gargi taught for two years (1966–67) at the University of Washington, where he met Jeanne Henry, who later became his wife. This period was the basis of his autobiography The Naked Triangle.

Balwant Gargi was the founder-director of the Indian Theatre Department, Panjab University, Chandigarh. The open-air theatre at the department is named after him. His students include Anupam Kher, Kiron Kher, Satish Kaushik, Poonam Dhillon, and many other current Bollywood stars.

Over the years, Gargi lectured and taught as a distinguished visiting professor at Harvard University, Vassar College, Mount Holyoke College, Trinity College, the University of Hawai'i, Yale University, and many other renowned international institutions.

His children, Manu Gargi and Jannat Gargi, are settled in the United States. They are both producers of films in Hollywood.

== See also ==
- Chaman Lal Chaman
