= Barnala railway station =

Train station in Punjab, India

Barnala

General information
- Location: Sadar Bazar, Barnala, Barnala district, Punjab; India
- Coordinates: 30°22′16″N 75°33′00″E
- Elevation: 228.86 metres (750.9 ft)
- System: Indian Railway
- Owner: Indian Railways
- Operator: Northern Railway
- Line: Bathinda–Rajpura line
- Platforms: 1
- Tracks: 5 ft 6 in (1,676 mm) broad gauge

Construction
- Structure type: Standard on ground
- Parking: Yes
- Accessible: Wheelchair ramp

Other information
- Status: Functioning
- Station code: BNN
- Division(s): Ambala
Location
- Location within Punjab

Barnala (station code: BNN) is a railway station located in Barnala district in the Indian state of Punjab and serves Barnala city which is the administrative headquarter of the district. Barnala station falls under Ambala railway division of Northern Railway zone of Indian Railways.

== Overview ==
Barnala railway station is located at an elevation of 229 metres (751 ft). This station is located on the single track, 5 ft 6 in (1,676 mm) broad gauge, Dhuri–Bathinda section of Bathinda–Rajpura line.

== Electrification ==
Barnala railway station is situated on double track electrified line. There are two electrified tracks at the station. The 68 km-long stretch from Dhuri station to Lehra Muhabbat station on Bathinda–Rajpura line was completed in July 2020, thereby providing complete electrification on Bathinda–Rajpura line.

== Amenities ==
Barnala railway station has 5 booking windows and all basic amenities like drinking water, public toilets, sheltered area with adequate seating. There is Two platforms at the station. Wheelchair facility is available and one foot overbridge (FOB).
