= Nabha =

City in Patiala (Punjab), India

- City
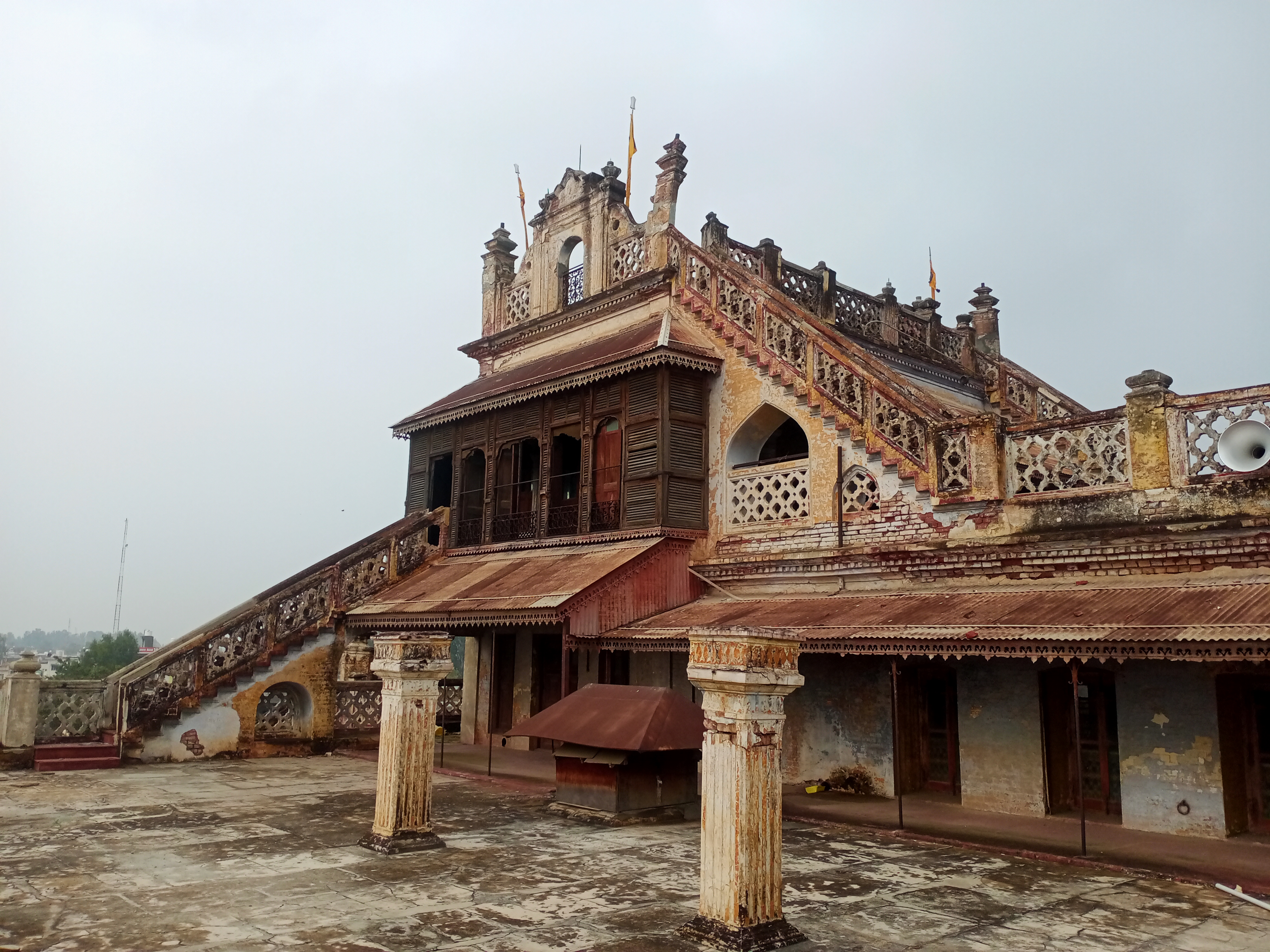
- Hira Mahal of Nabha

- Location in Punjab, India
- Coordinates: 30.37°N 76.15°E
- Country: India
- State: Punjab
- District: Patiala
- Founder: Sardar Armaan Singh

Government
  - Type: Democratic
  - Body: Municipal Council Nabha
  - Member of the Legislative Assembly (India): Gurdev Singh (Dev Maan)
- Elevation: 246 m (807 ft)

Population (2023)
  - Total: 95,000

Languages
  - Official: Punjabi
  - Native: Puadhi
- Time zone: UTC+5:30 (IST)
- PIN: 147201
- Telephone code: 91-(0)1765
- Vehicle registration: PB-34

Nabha is a city and municipal council in the Patiala district in the south-west of the Indian state of Punjab. It was the capital of the former Nabha State. Nabha is also a sub-division city which comes under Patiala district.

== Geography ==
Nabha is located at 30.37°N 76.15°E. It has an average elevation of 246 metres (807 feet).

== Demographics ==
As of 2001 India census, Nabha had a population of 67,972. Males constitute 53% of the population and females 47%. Nabha has an average literacy rate of 74%, higher than the national average of 59.5%: male literacy is 79%, and female literacy is 69%. In Nabha, 10% of the population is under 6 years of age.

== Modern Nabha ==
In 1947, Nabha formed a part of Patiala and East Punjab States Union (PEPSU). At a subsequent reorganization, Patiala was created as a district and Nabha formed a subdivision in Patiala District.

The modern Nabha is a thriving if somewhat dusty town (about 25 kilometers from Patiala). Nabha is famous as a manufacturing hub of combine harvesters.

== Transport ==
Nabha railway station is situated at Nabha town on Bathinda–Rajpura line.
