= Barnala =

Barnala Barnālā (Punjabi)
- City
- Location in Punjab, India Barnala (India)
- Coordinates: 30°22′N 75°32′E
- Country: India
- State: Punjab
- District: Barnala

Government
  - Type: Municipality
  - Body: Barnala Municipal Corporation
- Member of Parliament: Gurmeet Singh Meet Hayer
- Members of Legislative Assembly: Kuldeep Singh Dhillon

Population (2011)
  - Total: 116,450

Languages
  - Regional: Punjabi
- Time zone: UTC+5:30 (IST)
- Pin Code: 148101
- Vehicle registration: PB-19

Barnala is a city and the administrative headquarters of Barnala district in the Indian state of Punjab. Located in the Malwa region, it serves as an agricultural and trading hub and is surrounded by fertile plains.

As of the 2011 census, the city had a population of 116,449, while the district's population was 596,524.

Barnala district was carved out of Sangrur district on 19 November 2006, making it Punjab's 23rd district at the time.

== Etymology ==
The name "Barnala" has multiple proposed origins. One theory suggests it derives from the local term Vaaran (storm), evolving into Barnala. Another links it to a stepwell (Baahuli) near a fort built by Baba Ala Singh and Baba Anahat Khan, pronounced as Baain in the Malwai dialect, becoming Baain Wala or Barnala. The most accepted narrative credits Baba Ala Singh, an 18th-century Sikh warrior, who named the settlement after himself upon establishing it as his capital in 1775.

== History ==
In February 1762, Ahmad Shah Durrani, the founder of the Durrani Empire, marched to Barnala and sacked it, forcing Ala Singh, the maharaja of Patiala at the time, to surrender.

Sikh historian Giani has recorded the details of setting up of Barnala in the annals of Khalsa in this manner that in the year 1775 Baba Ala Singh after offering Bhadaur (set up by King Padhar Sain) to his brother Duna Singh came to Barnala region which was lying aloof at that time. Setting it up, he made it his capital and took under his control surrounding villages. It too appears that Anahatgarh may be existing before and must have been deserted following attacks of Dharvis.

There are different opinions about the nomenclature of Barnala. Some are of the view, Vaaran being a region because of frequent storms was at that time also called Varna. So Barnala was called a land of too many storms which later on became Barnala because of precision of example. Another view reveals that a fort here is said to be built by Baba Ala Singh And Baba Anahat khan in which there was a ‘Baahuli’ (a well which had stairs going down). That too due to precision and Malwai accent was known as ‘Baain’. Thus Baain Wala ultimately became Barnala. Thus these are different views only but no historical detail is available that how name Barnala came into existence. Barnala was named after Baba Ala Singh. Baba Ala Singh left Bhadaur with his elder brother (hometown of Patiala State) and settled at Barnala and conquered many areas with the help of his brothers the Bhadaur Sardars. Though it was a district headquarters in erstwhile princely state system, it was later merged in PEPSU (Patiala & East Punjab States Union) and degraded as sub divisional headquarters.

There is a stone "Rameshwaram Stone" in Nath Wala Dera – Village Handiaya Adjoining with Barnala that one floating in water.

== Demographics ==
Religion in Barnala
Religion	Percent
Sikhism	50.37%
Hinduism	47.67%
Islam	1.53%
Christianity	0.15%
Others	0.29%

As per provisional data of the 2011 census, Barnala had a population of 116,449, out of which males were 62,554 and females were 53,895, with a density of 5,060/km² and a sex ratio of 862 females per 1,000 males, below Punjab’s average of 895. The district had 595,527 residents (317,522 males, 278,005 females), with a sex ratio of 876 and a child sex ratio (0–6 years) of 835. Urban areas constitute 19.5% of the population. Scheduled Castes form 28.2% (city) and 29.5% (district), with negligible Scheduled Tribes (0.1%). Literacy is 79.59% in the city and 67.82% district-wide (males: 71.57%, females: 63.57%). Punjabi (Malwai dialect) is spoken by 97%, with Sikhs (50.37%), Hindus (47.67%), Muslims (1.53%), and others (0.43%) comprising the religious makeup.

== Economy ==
Standard Combines and Trident Group are both headquartered in Barnala.

Barnala mainly acts as a market place for surrounding villages, including Hamidi, and is also emerging as a trading town.

== Culture ==
Barnala embodies Malwai Punjabi culture, blending Punjabi Hindu and Sikh traditions with agrarian folk. Festivals like Baisakhi (April), Diwali, and Lohri feature bhangra, gidda dances, and heaving fairs. Cuisine highlights makki di roti-sarson da saag, chaap (soybean-based), and aloo paratha. The Barnala Bird Sanctuary (50 hectares) attracts 20,000 migratory birds annually, ideal for eco-tourism. Gurdwara Baba Ala Singh and local mela grounds host cultural events. Folk artists preserve tappa and boliyan songs.

== Transportation ==
Barnala lies on NH-9 (Delhi-Amritsar) and SH-7, connecting to Chandigarh (140 km) and Ludhiana (60 km). Barnala railway station (Northern Railway) handles 20+ daily trains, with nearest airports in Ludhiana (70 km) and Chandigarh (150 km). A ₹100 crore flyover (2024) eases city traffic, and PRTC operates 50 daily buses.

== Notable people ==
- Ram Sarup Ankhi - Punjabi writer, novelist and poet
- Surjit Singh Barnala - politician who served as the chief minister of Punjab state
- Kewal Singh Dhillon - President of BJP Punjab
- Balwant Gargi - Punjabi language dramatist, theatre director, novelist, and short story writer
- Rajinder Gupta - politician and founder of Trident Group
- Gurmeet Singh Meet Hayer - politician Lok Sabha MP Sangrur
- Rupinder Rupi - actress in Punjabi film industry
- Devendra Satyarthi - Indian folklorist and writer of Punjabi, Hindi and Urdu literature.
- Ala Singh - founder and first ruler of Patiala
- Karam Singh - soldier who was the first living recipient of the Param Vir Chakra
- Sant Ram Udasi - Punjabi poet

== Education ==
=== List of educational institutions ===
==== Schools ====
- Aryabhatta International School
