= Dant, Kentucky =

Unincorporated community in Kentucky, United States

- Unincorporated community
- Location within Kentucky Location within the United States
- Coordinates: 37°38′9″N 85°27′21″W
- Country: United States
- State: Kentucky
- County: Marion
- Elevation: 640 ft (200 m)
- Time zone: UTC-5 (Eastern (EST))
  - Summer (DST): UTC-4 (EST)
- GNIS feature ID: 507813

Dant is an unincorporated community in Marion County, Kentucky, United States. Its post office is closed.
