= Dant katha =

Dant Katha ("tooth stories") are Indian folk legends or fables.

The Dant Katha is known legend, which has been spoken for centuries. Dant Katha or Folklore has been spoken from generation to generation for centuries.

They were often recited as songs or poems.

In India these folklores or Dantkatha are of different varieties as you go from one region to the other.
