= Sant Ram Udasi =

Punjabi poet

- Born: Sant Ram; 20 April 1939; Raisar, Sangrur district (now Barnala district), Punjab, India
- Died: 6 November 1986 (aged 47)
- Occupations: Poet, Teacher
- Writing career
- Language: Punjabi
- Notable work: Lahu Bhije Bol (Blood-soaked Words)

Sant Ram Udasi (20 April 1939 – 6 November 1986) was one of the major Punjabi poets emerging out of the Naxalite movement in the Indian Punjab towards the late 1960s, writing about revolutionary and Dalit consciousness. Lok Kavi Sant Ram Udasi Memorial Trust (International) was established as a research foundation focusing on the life and works of Sant Ram Udasi.

During the 1970s he wrote three collections of poetry:

- Lahu Bhije Bol (Blood-soaked Words)
- Saintan (Gestures)
- Chounukrian (the Four-edged)
