= Kuldeep Singh Dhillon =

Indian politician

Member of Punjab Legislative Assembly
- Incumbent
- Assumed office 23 November 2024
- Preceded by: Gurmeet Singh Meet Hayer
- Constituency: Barnala

Personal details
- Party: Congress
- Profession: Politician

Kuldeep Singh Dhillon also known as Kuldeep Singh Dhillon Kaala Dhillon is an Indian politician from Punjab. He is a member of the Punjab Legislative Assembly since November 2024, representing Barnala Assembly constituency as a member of The Indian National Congress. He was preceded by Gurmeet Singh Meet Hayer.

== See also ==
- Punjab Legislative Assembly
