= Barnala district =

- District
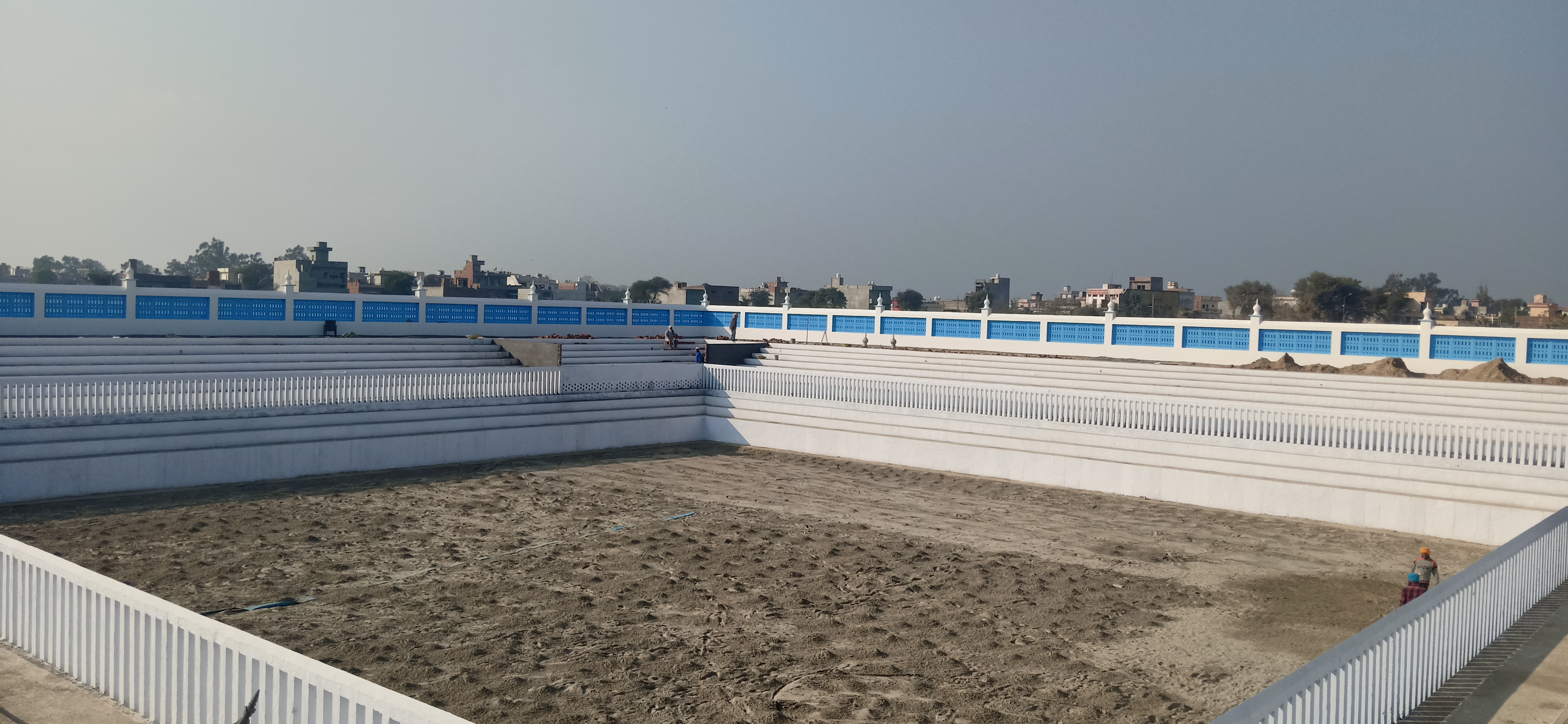
- Gurudwara Tap Asthan Bibi Pardhan Kaur

- Location in Punjab, India
- Country: India
- State: Punjab
- Established: 2006
- Headquarters: Barnala

Area
  - Total: 1,423 km^{2} (549 sq mi)

Population (2011)
  - Total: 595,527
  - Density: 418.5/km^{2} (1,084/sq mi)

Languages
  - Regional: Punjabi, Hindi, English
- Time zone: UTC+5:30 (IST)
- Website: barnala.gov.in

Barnala district is one of the 23 districts of the Indian state of Punjab. It was carved out of Sangrur district, in November 2006. It is a centrally located district bordered by Ludhiana district on the north, Moga district on northwest, Bathinda district on west, Sangrur district on east and Mansa district on south. As per census 2011, the population of District Barnala is 5,96,294. The district is part of the Patiala division.

It is a centrally located district bordered by Ludhiana district on the north, Moga district on the northwest, Bathinda district on the west, Sangrur district on east and Mansa district on south. The current MLAs of the district are Meet Hayer of Aam Aadmi Party (AAP) from Barnala Constituency, Labh Singh Ugoke of AAP from Bhadaur Constituency, and Kulwant Singh Pandori of AAP from Mehal Kalan Constituency.

As of 2026, Barnala becomes Municipal corporation Barnala Municipal corporation.

As of 2011, it is the least populous district of Punjab (out of 23).

== History ==
During the British era, the area that is now Barnala district was mostly part of Patiala State, with some areas belonging to Nabha State and some areas part of Ludhiana district. It functioned as a Nizamat (district) within Patiala state, comprising three tehsils: Mansa, Bathinda, and Barnala. This district was also historically referred to as Anahatgarth district.

After Patiala & other State accepted the dominion of India, and the princely states were reorganized, Barnala became part of the newly formed Patiala and East Punjab States Union (PEPSU) and was designated as a district within it. During this process, the district itself was also reorganized.

In 1953, the Barnala district was abolished. At that time, the district consisted of four tehsils: Phul, Dhuri, Malerkotla, and Barnala. A portion of Phul tehsil along with the remaining three tehsils—Dhuri, Malerkotla, and Barnala—were transferred to Sangrur district, & rest part of Phul tehsil was merged into Bathinda district.

Barnala regained its status as a separate district much later, on 19 November 2006, carved out from Sangrur district. The new Barnala district comprises two sub-divisions—Barnala and Tapa—with three sub-tehsils: Tapa, Bhadaur, and Dhanaula, and three development blocks: Barnala, Sehna, and Mehal Kalan.

== District administration ==
- The Deputy Commissioner (DC), an officer belonging to the Indian Administrative Service, is the overall in-charge of the general administration in the district. Currently Poonamdeep Kaur, IAS is Deputy Commissioner of Barnala District. He is assisted by a number of officers belonging to Punjab Civil Service and other state services.
- The Senior Superintendent of Police (SSP) is entrusted with the responsibility of maintaining law and order and related issues of the district. Currently, Mr.Sandeep Malik, IPS is the Senior Superintendent of Police. He is expected to maintain very cordial relations with all the NGO's and social associations of the city. He is assisted by the officers of the Punjab Police Service and other Punjab Police officials.
- Indian Red Cross Society (IRC). Red Cross is globally accredited for its presence in providing quality health care services and always extends a helping hand to the needy. Indian Red Cross Society (IRC), Barnala District branch is having Mr. Sarwan Singh as its secretary. Patrons, Life Members, and volunteers of the society recently attended a "Seminar on Fund Raising and Capacity Building" at Ferozepur (the border town of Punjab)on 26 April 2011. Dr. Raj Kumar Jindal led the delegation.
- The District Public Relations Officer (DPRO). He is responsible for public relations of the state government as well as the district administrations. He issues and authorizes press notes to the print and electronic media of the district. Maintains records of all press and electronic channel reporters. Currently, Smt. Megha Mann is the DPRO of the Barnala District.
- The Divisional Forest Officer (DFO), an officer belonging to the Indian Forest Service is responsible for managing the forests, environment, and wildlife-related issues of the district. He is assisted by the officers of the Punjab Forest Service and other Punjab Forest officials and Punjab Wild-Life officials. Sectoral development is looked after by the district head of each development department such as PWD, Agriculture, Health, Education, and Animal husbandry. These officers belong to various State Services.
- The District Informatics Officer (DIO), head of National Informatics Center. This department works regarding the E-Governance and other Technology-based Services that provide an automated environment to do the various tasks in District Office. Currently, Mr.Mohammad kasif is DIO.

=== Subdistricts of Barnala district ===
According to the Indian government's integrated online directory, Barnala district is divided into the following subdistricts (tehsils/subdivisions) and blocks:

- Subdistricts
  1. Barnala
  2. Mehal Kalan
  3. Tapa
- Blocks:
  1. Barnala
  2. Mehal Kalan
  3. Sehna

== Demographics ==
Languages of Barnala district (2011)
1. Punjabi (95.1%)
2. Hindi (4.30%)
3. Others (0.56%)

Religion in Barnala district (2011)
Religion	Percent
Sikhism	78.54%
Hinduism	18.95%
Islam	2.20%
Other or not stated	0.30%

Historical population
Year	Pop.	±% p.a.
1951	188,189	—
1961	242,368	+2.56%
1971	292,463	+1.90%
1981	362,663	+2.17%
1991	440,772	+1.97%
2001	526,931	+1.80%
2011	595,527	+1.23%

According to the 2011 census, Barnala district has a population of 595,527, roughly equal to the nation of Solomon Islands or the US state of Wyoming. As per 2011 census, Barnala is the least populous district of Punjab. This gives it a ranking of 527th in India (out of a total of 640). The district has a population density of 419 inhabitants per square kilometre (1,090/sq mi). Its population growth rate over the decade 2001-11 was 13.16%. Barnala has a sex ratio of 876 females for every 1,000 males, and a literacy rate of 68.9%. Scheduled Castes made up 32.24% of the population.

At the time of the 2011 census, 95.14% of the population spoke Punjabi and 4.30% Hindi as their first language.

The table below shows the population of different religions in absolute numbers in the urban and rural areas of Barnala district.

Absolute numbers of different religious groups in Barnala district
Religion	Urban (2011)	Rural (2011)
Sikh	1,03,541	3,64,210
Hindu	82,016	30,843
Muslim	4,304	8,796
Christian	358	264
Other religions	466	729

The table below shows the population of different religious groups in Barnala district, as of 2011 census.

Population by religious groups in Barnala district, 2011 census
Religion	Total	Female	Male
Sikh	467,751	220,451	247,300
Hindu	112,859	50,679	62,180
Muslim	13,100	6,058	7,042
Christian	622	286	336
Jain	246	105	141
Buddhist	108	41	67
Other religions	481	227	254
Not stated	360	158	202
Total	595,527	278,005	317,522

== Economy ==
The income of Municipalities and Municipal corporations in Barnala district from municipal rates and taxes in the year 2018 was 236,253 thousand rupees.

== Health ==
The table below shows the data from the district nutrition profile of children below the age of 5 years, in Barnala, as of year 2020.

District nutrition profile of children under 5 years of age in Barnala, year 2019-21
Indicators	Number of children (<5 years)	Percent (2019-21)
Stunted	33.8%	24.6%
Wasted	9.4%	11.8%
Severely wasted	2.4%	6.1%
Underweight	16.5%	17.9%
Overweight/obesity	6.1%	3.4%
Anemia	60.6%	51.5%

The table below shows the district nutrition profile of Barnay of women between the ages of 15 and 49 years, as of year 2019-21.

District nutritional profile of Taran Taran of women of 15-49 years, in 2019-21
Indicators	Percent (2019-21)	Percent (2015-16)
Underweight (BMI <18.5 kg/m^2)	13.0%	13.2%
Overweight/obesity	37.7%	32.4%
Anemia (non-preg)	55.2%	42.6%
Anemia (preg)	58.5%	45.0%

The table below shows the current use of family planning methods by currently married women between the ages of 15 and 49 years, in Barnala district.

Family planning methods used by women between the ages of 15 and 49 years, in Barnala district
Method	Total (2019–21)	Total (2015–16)	Urban (2015-16)	Rural (2015-16)
Female sterilization	25.8%	43.5%	40.7%	44.8%
Male sterilization	0.6%	0.3%	0.5%	0.3%
IUD/PPIUD	3.2%	9.2%	6.2%	10.7%
Pill	2.9%	2.8%	2.6%	2.8%
Condom	20.7%	12.0%	17.3%	9.5%
Injectables	0.2%	0.4%	--	--
Any modern method	53.6%	68.4%	67.3%	68.9%
Any method	69.3%	78.6%	82.6%	76.7%
Total unmet need	9.4%	5.5%	5.2%	5.7%
Unmet need for spacing	3.6%	2.1%	1.7%	2.2%

The table below shows the number of road accidents and people affected in Barnala district by year.

Road accidents and people affected in Barnala district by year
Year	Accidents	Killed	Injured	Vehicles Involved
2022	113	79	80	174
2021	138	95	90	157
2020	164	117	107	124
2019	179	117	140	205

== Politics ==
No.	Constituency	Name of MLA	Party	Bench
106	Bhadaur	Labh Singh Ugoke	Aam Aadmi Party	Government
107	Barnala	Kuldeep Singh Dhillon	Indian National Congress	Opposition
108	Mehal Kalan (SC)	Kulwant Singh Pandori	Aam Aadmi Party	Government

== Notable people ==
- Ram Sarup Ankhi - Punjabi writer, novelist and poet
- Surjit Singh Barnala - politician who served as the chief minister of Punjab state
- Kewal Singh Dhillon - President of BJP Punjab
- Balwant Gargi - Punjabi language dramatist, theatre director, novelist, and short story writer
- Rajinder Gupta - politician and founder of Trident Group
- Gurmeet Singh Meet Hayer - politician Lok Sabha MP Sangrur
- Rupinder Rupi - actress in Punjabi film industry
- Devendra Satyarthi - Indian folklorist and writer of Punjabi, Hindi and Urdu literature.
- Ala Singh - founder and first ruler of Patiala
- Karam Singh - soldier who was the first living recipient of the Param Vir Chakra
- Sant Ram Udasi - Punjabi poet

== See also ==
- Chananwal
- Pharwahi
- Uppli
