= Bathinda–Rajpura line =

Indian railway line

Rajpura–Bathinda line
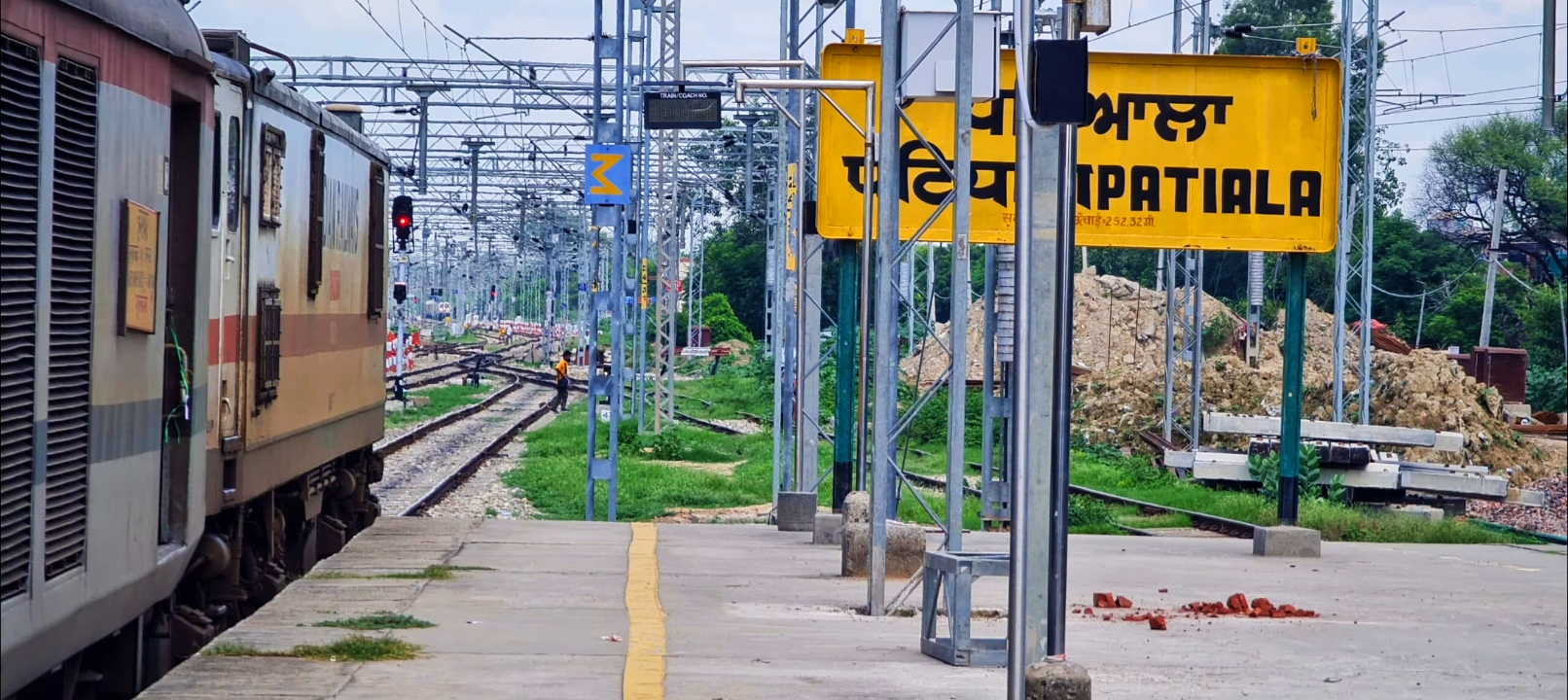
- Patiala railway station is an important Railway Station on Rajpura-Bathinda Line

Overview
- Status: Operational
- Owner: Indian Railways
- Locale: Punjab
- Termini: Bathinda Junction; Rajpura Junction

Service
- System: (Fully electrified and doubling in progress)
- Operator: Northern Railway

Technical
- Track length: 173 km (107 mi)
- Number of tracks: 1 (single)
- Track gauge: 5 ft 6 in (1,676 mm) broad gauge
- Electrification: doubling in progress with electrification
- Operating speed: 110 km/h (68 mph)
- Highest elevation: Rajpura 274 m (899 ft); Bathinda 207 m (679 ft)

The Rajpura–Bathinda line is a railway line connecting Bathinda and Rajpura in the Indian state of Punjab. The line is under the administrative jurisdiction of Northern Railway.

== Main stations ==
- Rajpura Junction
- Patiala
- Nabha
- Dhuri Junction
- Barnala
- Tapa
- Rampura phul
- Lehra mahabat
- Bhuchchu
- Bathinda Junction

== History and key developments on the route ==
The Maharaja of Patiala was built the railway station in the perpendicular orientation as he had hoped that one day the Ambala–Ludhiana would be diverted via Patiala, but that never happened. One reason was the trains would have to pay the taxes levied by the Pepsu state. In February 2015, doubling of track between Rajpura–Patiala–Bathinda was sanctioned.

In 2016, electrification of the single broad-gauge railway line from Rajpura to Dhuri junction is under progress which is being executed by Rail Vikas Nigam Ltd.

Patiala railway station on the line is also one of the 400 stations to be redeveloped under the Government of India's AMRUT scheme. In 2016, the work for the platform-1 extension is in progress which shall be extended to another 200 meters to accommodate the longest possible train. In March 2017, work for doubling of Rajpura–Patiala–Bathinda line was partly given to Northern railway construction but later all was allotted and interested in rail Vikas Nigam limited. As it is also a feeder route for Eastern Dedicated Freight Corridor. It has capacity utilization to the peak. The doubling is scheduled to start for December 2018.

== Electrification ==
The rail link has been approved by the rail board for electrification to the Lehra Mahabat railway station and doubling to Bathinda junction. The electrification trail between Rajpura and Dhuri was completed on 10 September 2019. Commission of Railway Safety(CRS) has given clearance to electrification up to Dhuri Junction. Bathinda to Rajpura track is fully electrified and functional now.
