= Music of Punjab =

Overview of music traditions in Punjab

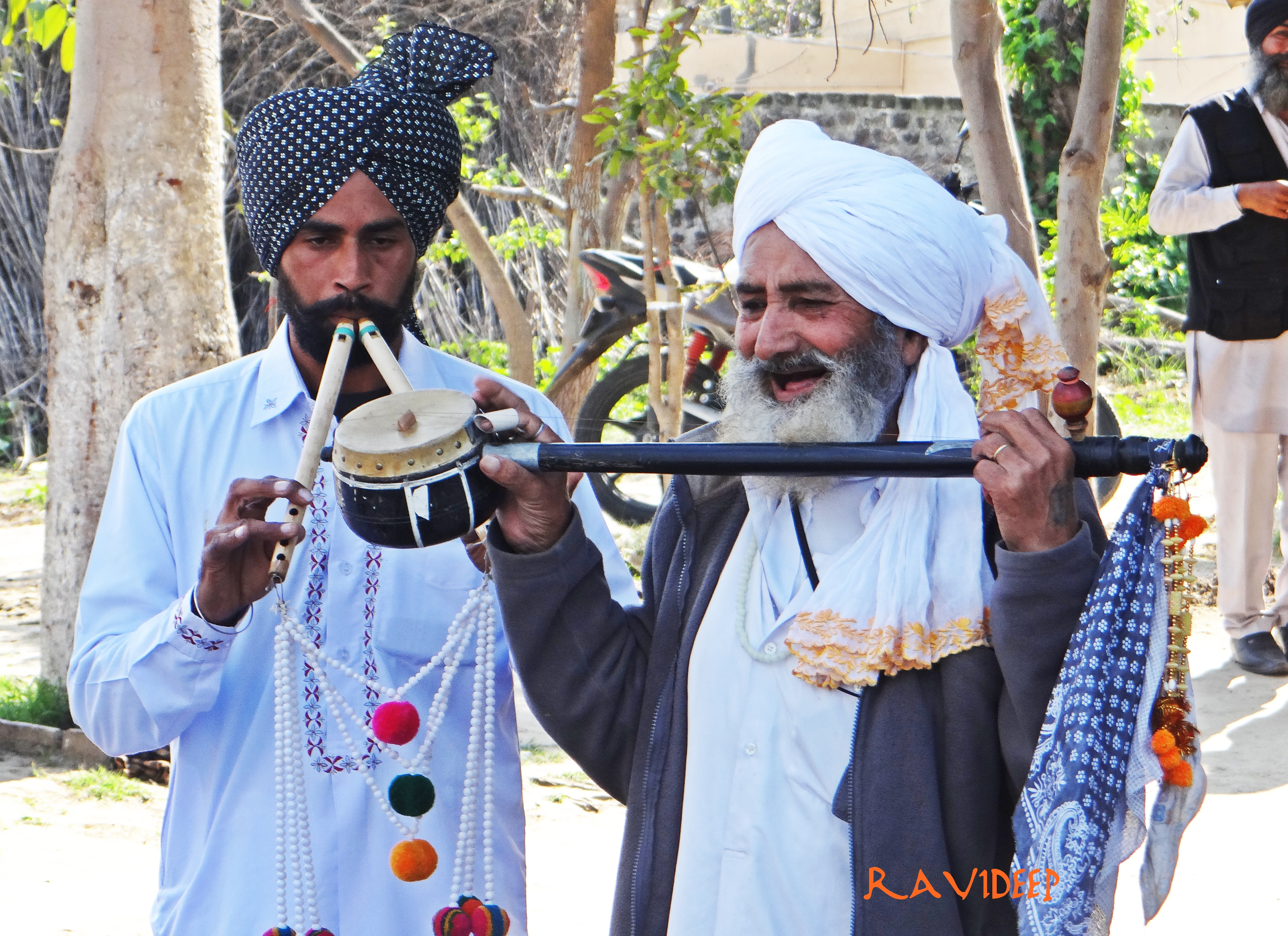
Punjabi men playing the Punjabi instruments Algoza (left) and Tumbi (right)

The music of Punjab reflects the traditions of the Punjab region associated with Punjabi language. Punjab is a region of the Indian subcontinent currently divided into two parts: eastern Punjab, in India and western Punjab in Pakistan. The Punjab has diverse styles of music, ranging from folk and Sufi to classical, notably the Patiala gharana. Contemporary Punjabi music has tended to include more modern hip-hop and R&B sounds. While this style of music is most popular in Punjab, it has seen popularity across the subcontinent and areas with large Punjabi diaspora populations, such as Canada, the United Kingdom, and the United States. In India, 331 music-records and 47 music-tapes were produced in Punjabi by 1989.

== Classical music ==
- Patiala Gharana
- Sham Chaurasia gharana
- Punjab Gharana

=== Instruments ===
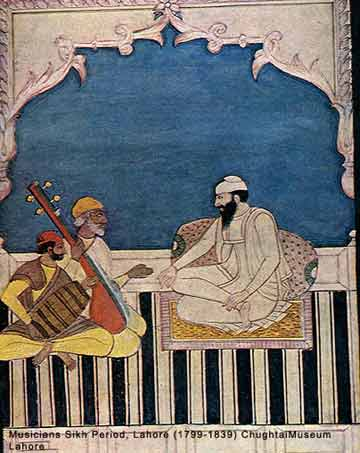
Painting from Lahore of musicians from the Sikh period (1799–1849)

During the past century, Punjabi folk musicians used 87 instruments, 55 of which are still used today. It is notable that the instruments used today serve a function that exceeds musical necessity in that they are closely tied to Punjabi culture and heritage. The dhol, for example, continues to be popular because it is important to special proceedings such as weddings and sporting events. Additionally, the popularity of certain instruments encourages people to continue learning to play them; therefore, maintaining their relevance in Punjabi events.

Terrorist events during the late 1980s threatened the existence of Punjabi folk music and the instruments that accompanied this genre. With several notable artists being killed and major festivals being cancelled there was not a space for folk music to exist. The boom of technology also threatened folk music by creating a new genre of music known as Punjabi Pop, which mixed electronic and folk music. The following instruments are the most popular within Punjabi music.

Algoza: The algoza “consists of two joined beak flutes, one for melody, the second for drone” and the “flutes are either tied together or may be held together loosely with the hands”. A continuous flow of air is necessary as the player blows into the two flutes simultaneously.

Dhol: Resembles much of the construction of a drum. It is a two-sided drum of mango wood, 48 cm long and 38 cm wide and is played using two slightly curved sticks. It is thought to have a much more significant value to the artisans such as the blacksmiths or the cobblers. It is usually played during neutral occasions and mostly by only men.

Chimta: The chimta are similar to tongs and consist of a 122 cm-long iron strip that is bent in half and adorned with an iron ring set. The small metal discs called chaene are “attached on the inner side of the tongs so as to strike against each other like small cymbals when the arms of the chimta are struck”.

Dholki: The dholki is a smaller, feminine version of the dhol. It is played by women in marriages and religious gatherings. It is rarely decorated with tassels.

Kanjari: This is a shallow one sided drum, round or sometimes octagonal, 18 to 28 cm in diameter and set with rattling discs around the rim- in essence of a tambourine. It accompanies singing, dances and religious activities.

Kato: This is a stick with a squirrel (galad) on top. Attached to the head of the squirrel is a cord, which jerks its head up, “producing a sharp click”. At the same time, bells attached to its tail jingle.

Dhad: The Dhad has the hourglass shape of the damroo, but is slightly larger. The body of this instrument is made from mango, mulberry or sheesham wood and the heads are covered in goatskin held taut with cords. The fingers are used to tap and make sounds that can vary based on how tightly or loosely the strings are maintained.

=== Dances ===
Dance traditions of Punjab represent a collection of folk art forms that have evolved significantly and changed in meaning throughout the centuries. After the Partition of 1947, Punjab was marked by a period of state-building efforts that sought to establish a national identity, which was intimately tied to the revival, folklorization, and ritualization of many of Punjab's older dances. During this period, bhangra dance in particular became tokenized as the iconic emblem of the Punjab region as a whole, overshadowing other important and centuries-old folk dances of the region. Punjab's rich repertoire of folk dances include jhummar, sammi, luddi, dandas, nachar, and giddha. There are prominent dances in Punjab, but are perhaps less familiar to a global audience. Jhummar is a widely established Punjabi dance; there was a decline in jhummar performances, though it was later revived as a conscious reaction to the over-commodified and over-sensationalized bhangra dance to invoke a more traditional notion of Punjab. The name jhummar stems from ghoomar, designated a performance done in a circular direction or group of individuals spinning. It is generally performed only by men, and the movements are generally “relatively slow and gentle, and often considered rather “feminine” when compared to other Punjabi dances. Dance movements are performed in unison." Musical accompaniment usually involves the dhol barrel drum. Sammi is a simple female dominated dance traditionally performed by women in the Sandal Bar region of Punjab that has existed from at least the eighteenth century that was revived after the Partition of 1947. Giddha is a dance of Malwa, the Southeast region of Punjab that has both expression in men and women's forms, and involves pairs of individuals dancing while others stand in a circle around them singing lyrical verses (boliyan).

== Devotional music ==
=== Gurbani Sangeet ===
Gurbani sangeet (Gurmukhi: ਗੁਰਬਾਣੀ ਸੰਗੀਤ), also known as Gurmat Sangeet (Gurmukhi: ਗੁਰਮਤਿ ਸੰਗੀਤ), is the classical music style that is practised with Sikhi. In this musical tradition, the Sikhs sing shabads which are hymns written by their SatGuru in raag. Instruments used in this art are known as “tanti saaj” (stringed instruments; ਤੰਤੀ ਸਾਜ਼). The majority of these instruments had been invented by the Sikh Gurus. They include: the 'Firandia' Rabab, Saranda, Jori, Pakhaawaj, Taus, and the Dilruba. Etymologically, the word "shabad" is derived from the Sanskrit word shabda which means sound or word. Preaching of Sikh Gurus is called bani or ‘’transcript of Sikh Satgurus, which is set to music in various Sikh scriptures called granths”. The most notable granth is the Satguru, Sri Guru Granth Sahib. The Satguru, Sri Guru Granth Sahib is not only the Sikh’s eternal SatGuru (and so is given the utmost deference) it is also divided into chapters which are raags rather than aspects of life. The first Shabad in SatGuru Granth Sahib is the Mool Mantar. Examples of Shabad in other Sikh scriptures, include the hymn Deh Siva Var Mohe in Dasam Granth. The raags that are sung are common to Hindustani classical music. Some raags have also been created by the Sikhs in SatGuru Sri Guru Granth Sahib; for example, raag jaijaivanti was created by the 9th SatGuru Sri Guru Tegh Bahadur Sahib. Ghar is a musical sign, used at the top of the Shabad in the Satguru, Sri Guru Granth Sahib. It gives a hint to Raagees as to what musical clef (beat) to sing the Shabad in. In other words, "Ghar" binds music and poetry in their metrical-form. There are up to seventeen "Ghar" mentioned in the SGGS. Musicologists have different interpretations of this term. But the consensus seems to be that it denotes the parts of a Taal (beat). Gurmukhi script is used for the Shabad. “Ragees” are the Sikh singers of Gurmat Sangeet. Ragees form groups of three or more consisting of a percussionist, a backup singer and the main singer. Rababees are the main singers of Gurmat sangeet and are descendants of the first rababee Bhai Mardana. Since the first SatGuru, the rababees have been the main singers of Gurmat Sangeet however, since the partition of India and Pakistan, rababees had been unable to perform Gurmat sangeet, with ragis taking the responsibility

=== Sufi music ===
Sufi music includes the singing of Sufi poetry in several genres. Some of the poets whose compositions are often sung include Baba Farid, Bulleh Shah, Shah Hussain, Waris Shah, and Mian Muhammad Bakhsh.

== Folk music ==
Folk music of the Punjab is the traditional music of Punjab produced using traditional musical instruments like Tumba, Algoza, Dhadd, Sarangi, Chimta, etc. There is a wide range of folk songs for every occasion from birth to death including marriage, festivals, fairs, and religious ceremonies.

Folk music is often perceived as the traditional music of Punjab and typically has communal authorship. This aspect of folk music has shifted with time but the older categories of folk begin with the dhadi genre, which does follow ideas of communal authorship. The folk dhadi genre emphasizes stories of heroism and love stories, as exemplified by the numerous ballads of the legendary romantic tales of Hir-Ranjha and Sahiba-Mirza. Folk music is also commonly used in various life-cycle events in the Punjab region. “In almost every wedding ceremony family members, friends, and professional folk musicians perform different sets of folk songs which use themes from a nostalgic past, but communicate themes of separation, joy, fear, and hope in the present.” The lyrical content of many of these wedding songs have the paternal home depicted as a source of love and nurture, while the in-laws home is a source of tyranny and torture. Folk music continues to be used as a modern tool and a way of locating identification.

Paudhi, a Punjabi folk song

=== Ritual and life-cycle songs ===
The notion of the traditional or folk music remains a critical part of Punjab society because it aids in the preservation of long-established customs. Life-cycle songs mostly “coincide with ritual occasions and they often mark stages in a ceremony” and can vary in topic ranging from birth to marriage. For example, family members and friends sing these songs during wedding festivities, and by doing so help protect the traditional rituals associated with each step of the marriage. Suhag or ghorian, which are sung for the bride and groom respectively, typically give praise to God and ask for blessings from God. Women typically sing these songs in a choral fashion and may also focus on the ideal groom and bride. Both song genres celebrate the emotion of joy specifically surrounding the wedding process. The ghorian emotes feeling of “pure joy and desire”, while the suhag is a “mixture of joy and grief”. There are also songs that are associated with each night of the wedding starting as far back as five nights before to spread turmeric paste on the bride and groom. By having these songs, Punjabi people continue to celebrate the traditional cultural practices and have “transformed and even...revitalized” the way marriages are celebrated.

While folk songs exist to commemorate important moments in one's life, they also “serve as a repository of local culture, beliefs, social structures, and response to historical change” because they reflect the current climate within local communities. With the subject of these songs varying from praising God to simply discussing the qualms of an agrarian lifestyle, they provide greater insight into Punjabi daily life. While folks song are “set in complex cultural context of a society” that is consumed by a strict social system influenced by social and economic status, they reveal that these “village people of all levels interact daily in a manner that demonstrates their mutual codependence”. Because of this, folk music serves as a way to further encourage this mixture that helps to break down social constructs.

=== Short verse forms and entertainment songs ===
These include Tappa, Mahia, and Dhola.

=== Professional musicians and genres ===
Professional performing communities in Punjab represent endogamous ethnic groups who generally occupy a lower-class status of service providers and are patronized by higher classes. Generally, men dominate professional music production and are trained in the ‘master-disciple’ system. Professional musicians are occupational specialists who inherit their professions through their musician ancestors. The most prominent group are the Mirasis, which is an umbrella occupational label used to designate all hereditary musicians. Mirasis serve as genealogists and are responsible for committing to memory and singing the praises of their lineages. Mirasis are generally Muslims (settled in West Punjab) who emerged from the “Dum” group and encompass many performing communities that “differ depending on kinship practices, musical sophistication, and sociomusical contexts.” Other professional performing communities include the tribal Bazigar group, performers of the dhadi and tumba-algoza genre.

Bazigar (Goaar) people: From their base in West Punjab in the pre-Partition era, Bazigar performers carried both traditions that were unique to their community and those that were typical of the local residents of that area. However, despite their contributions to the music world and performing sector of Punjab, they are poorly recognized by their neighbors and outsiders. mainstream Punjab classifies these people as the “acrobats” of the society. The Bazigar people have neither inclination nor the opportunity to remedy that situation. At present they are becoming more and more integrated into the mainstream society. Their performances consist of the display of a variety of physical feats: strength, balance, agility, and courage. Performances were usually invited by big festivals and occasions. They would begin with the beating of the dhols in order to enhance excitement and call attention to the event.

Dhadi: Refers to both a genre of Punjabi music and the performers who play it. It is a distinctly composed ensemble of ballad-singers. The folk dhadi genre is subject to three main poetic forms namely baint, sadd, and kali. It has four main aspects: discourse, poetry, singing and music. The concerts were usually held outside of villages on the banks of a pond or in some other open space under the dense shade of a few large tree, or else the religious-camps of the village. A distinctive feature of the folk dhadi's art has been a continuous and strict practice regimen. Usually these dhadis were completely illiterate or practically so. They would have to learn by hearing others, so their power of memory, would have to be very great. Their attire usually consisted of dazzling white, starched turbans with fan. The white color is a symbol of wisdom, learning and cleanliness. Another ballad-style form of music is the tumba-algoza genre based in the regions of Malwa and Majha.

== Popular music ==
=== History of Popular Music Recording ===
Dhādī and Dāstāngo groups recorded the first records of Punjabi popular music in the 1930s. They chose to record arrangements of weighty ballads that were appropriate listening entertainment because they were often performed at a fair or at a wedding. Shortly afterward, cinema with sound became available in India, and throughout the 1930s-1950s film songs dominated the recordings of popular music in Punjab. These songs were accompanied by Indian instruments and Western instrumentation. Many of the most famous actor-singers in India came from Punjab, including Kundan Lal Saigal, Noor Jahan, and Shamshad Begum.

In the 1950s, commercial recordings of folk-style Punjabi music began. Lal Chand “Yamla Jatt” was among the prominent voices of these recordings. While his stage name suggested he belonged to the Jat ethnicity, Lal Chand belonged to the Chamar community, which was marginalized as opposed to mainstream, like the Jat ethnicity. He also developed the tūmbī, a one-stringed instrument that is now iconic for Punjabi “folk” singers.

In the 1960s, a new type of popular “folk song” began to be recorded. The majority of these songs were not orally transmitted, anonymous compositions, and many were composed by contemporary songwriters, in a parallel to the folk movement in the UK and the United States. The songs themselves were considered “folk” because they were simple and in Punjabi language, but the accompaniments and musical settings mimicked film-song instead of rural music. An example of a singer in this style would be Singh Mastana, who really emphasized Punjabi identity. Another famous example is Surinder Kaur, who was born into a Sikh, Jat family that did not approve of singing, but who had a very successful career.

By the 1980s, the introduction of affordable cassette players made it possible for independent music labels to flourish in Punjab. These independent labels had lower operating costs, so they were able to offer more regional music. In contrast to previous music that only had explicitly Punjabi content in the songs in order to make the music Punjabi, this new music had a Punjabi instrumentation and rustic vocal tone to make the music sound Punjabi. Some examples of artists who made this style of music include K.S. Narula and Charanjit Ahuja. A popular format in the genre were duets recorded by artists like Chamkila and Amarjot.

=== Bhangra evolution from folk to pop ===
Bhangra describes dance-oriented popular music with Punjabi rhythms. The name refers to one of the traditional and folkloric Punjabi dances. Thus in bhangra music the emphasis is usually on the music (i.e. rhythm for dancing) and less on the singer and the lyrics. Shift from folk instruments to pop started to happen since the 1980s, since then Bhangra dance music developed into a popular pop genre appreciated all over the globe, specially among the Punjabi diaspora.

=== Punjabi pop ===
Punjabi songs in recent years have entered mainstream Indian culture, as well as in the UK and U.S., and its inclusion in Bollywood songs. The rise in popularity in Punjabi music in London and in the suburb of Southall, which has a sizeable South Asian population, can be attributed to the diaspora of immigrants from both the east and west Punjab to the United Kingdom in the 1970s. By the 1980s, Punjabi music, many types of which were now being referred to as “bhangra,” started to be played in discos.

In addition to the UK, Punjabi music has also gained popularity in the United States. This inclusion of Punjabi music in popular culture has continued and become more salient today, as exemplified by UK-based Panjabi MC's “Mundian to Bach Ke” becoming a Top 40 hit in the United States, being listened to widely by non-Punjabis. Furthermore, second generation Indian American youth in major American cities such as New York and New Jersey have adopted elements of Punjabi music into their nightlife. The music that is popular amongst this Indian American subculture incorporates both Western and Eastern influences. Urban sounds including hip hop, R&B, and reggae are mixed with the more traditional Indian genres of bhangra and Hindi film music.

Punjabi music has also made its mark in mainstream Hindi cinema. It has typically been characterized as “an ethnocultural signifier of Panjabi celebration,” and more recently, “a national signifier of fun.”

==== Diaspora developments ====
Although the diaspora of Punjabi music to western countries such as the United Kingdom first became popular in the 1980s, the trend continued into the 1990s. In the UK in particular, Punjabi music became intertwined with American and British popular music, as Punjabi youth connected their western experience with their cultural roots. It became an important medium through which Punjabi youth could navigate their unique identities as British Indians. The British press sporadically became aware of trends in Punjabi music, especially with the rise of popular artists such as Panjabi MC and Apache Indian; that said, however, the diaspora of Punjabi music was primarily a local phenomenon, limited to Punjabi communities in the UK.

The 1990s marked a significant shift in Punjabi music pertaining to production styles and lyrical content. The decade was marked by a musical style that contained consistent elements of traditional music including instruments such as the dhol, tumbi, and algoza. However, the 90s were the first time that elements from other genres such as reggae and disco/club type of instrumentals were incorporated in the music. This is seen as the decade that produced the birth of what is commonly referred to today as “fusion” Punjabi music.

One prime example of a breakthrough artist that exemplified this new fusion style was Apache Indian. His song “Arranged Marriage,” produced by British Indian Punjabi brothers Simon and Diamond and released on the album titled No Reservations (1993), combined a reggae lyrical style, traditional dhol elements, and a Punjabi background chorus. Many more prominent Punjabi artists and producers broke through into mainstream Punjabi music during this time. They included Bally Sagoo, Sukshinder Shinda, and Jazzy B. Bally Sagoo became famous for his productions and remix. Shinda became renowned for his production ability and inclusion of vigorous dhol beats, while Jazzy B exemplified the influence hip-hop had in Punjabi music in his image and tough lyrics.

==== Global Punjabi music industry ====
Diaspora music has been spread back to India through media, including radio, cassettes and the TV channels MTV and ETC Panjabi. The 2000s Diaspora music was a reflection of the evolution that took place in Punjabi music in the 1990s. Artists began to develop and build upon the styles and foundations that were previously established as popular and successful musical styles abroad.

With the mixture of styles of both Punjabi and Western culture, there became a fusion in both the music and the identity formation of those living abroad. Because samples of famous Hindi and Punjabi music have been included in the club scene, youth are able to “inculcate an Indian identity.” Youth of the Diaspora can use these fusions to help establish their hybrid identities. These identities could include urban American culture or British culture alongside Indian culture. While this new identity has been created by the Diaspora youth the same ideas of identity do not hold for older generations, causing divides between the two.

The artists of this time period and the music they produced had a large effect on the popularity and transformation of Punjabi music into a type of genre that became an enjoyable and popular component of nightlife for South Asians. Dr. Zeus for example produced club-friendly instrumentals and collaborated with established Punjabi artists to take the fusion sound to a higher and more sophisticated level. His song “Kangna” reflects a fusion between club, hip-hop, and Punjabi musical styles. While Punjabi MC became famous in the late 1990s for his hit “Mundian tho Bachke Rahin,” he has continued to produce music that reflects a similar style and is extremely popular with the first and second generation South Asian population.

By 2016, touring musicians claimed that Punjabi music grew by 60 to 80% over the last two to three years in Canada, where Punjabi folk hop artists, such as Jaz Dhami, credit Prime Minister Justin Trudeau for his contribution for "promoting Indian culture and Punjabi music ... leader who understands the importance of Punjabi music in his country's music space."

== See also ==
- List of Punjabi singers
- Punjabi culture
- Punjabi folk dances
- Punjabi folk instruments
- Indian dances
- Indian music
- Pakistani music
- Indian musical instruments

== Sources ==
- Pande, Alka. (1999). Folk Music & Musical Instruments of Punjab. Middletown, NJ: Grantha Corporation. ISBN 818582262X
