= Malwa (disambiguation) =

Malwa may refer to the following entities in India:

Central India

- Malwa, plateau in central India and one of the six historical regions of northern India, part of the modern Madhya Pradesh state
  - Malwa culture, a Chalcolithic culture based in Malwa
  - Malwa Express, a passenger train in India
  - Malwa or Malvi, a zebu cattle breed of India
  - Kingdom of Malwa (disambiguation)
  - Malwa Sultanate (1401–1562), medieval kingdom of India
  - Malwa Subah (1568–1743), a top-level province of Mughal India
  - Malwa Agency (1895–1947), administrative section of the Central India Agency for indirect rule of the princely states of British India
  - Malwa Union later Madhya Bharat (1948–1957), former state of India, merged with Madhya Pradesh
  - Battle of Malwa, 1738, part of the Mughal-Maratha wars

elsewhere in India

- Malwa (Punjab), one of the three geographical regions that make up Punjab, India

== See also ==
- Malva (disambiguation)
- Malvi (disambiguation)
- Malavas, an ancient Indian people
- Malwas, a village in Churu district, Rajasthan, India
- Malwasthan, a region in Punjab, India
- Malwai dialect, a dialect of Punjabi in Malwa, Punjab, India
- Malwai Giddha, a form of the giddha folk dance from Malwa, Punjab, India
