= Malavi =

Malavi may refer to:

- Malavi, India, a village in Karnataka, India
- Malavi, Iran
- Malavi Rural District
- Malvi, breed of cattle from India

== See also ==
- Malvi (disambiguation)
- Malawi, a landlocked country in southeastern Africa
- Mali, a landlocked country in West Africa
- Mallavi, a town in Mullaitivu District, Sri Lanka
- Mallawi, a city in Egypt
- Marawi, a city in Lanao del Sur, Philippines
- Melawi Regency, a regency in West Kalimantan, Indonesia
