= Malvi (disambiguation) =

Malvi may refer to:

- of, from, or related to the Malwa/Malva region of central India
  - Malvi language, an Indo-Aryan language
  - Malvi, breed of cattle from central India
- of, from, or related to the distinct Malwa/Malva region of Indian Punjab
  - Malwai dialect/Malvi, of the Punjabi language
  - Malwai Giddha, a form of the giddha folk dance
- Malvi Malhotra (born 1997), Indian actress

== See also ==
- Malva (disambiguation)
- Malwa (disambiguation)
