= Sapp (instrument) =

Sapp or Chhikka
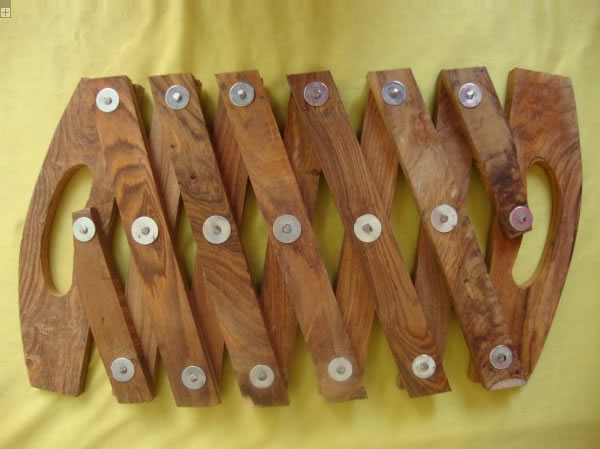
- Sapp or Chhikka
- Other names: Sap, Supp, Chhikka, Chikka
- Classification: Percussion instrument

More articles or information
- Dhol, Kato, Algoza

Sapp (Punjabi: ਸੱਪ, also known as Chhikka (Punjabi: ਛਿੱਕਾ)), also spelled as Sap or Supp is a musical instrument native to Punjab. It is used with the folk dances Bhangra and Malwai Giddha.

== Design and playing ==
It is made of wood with many X-shaped small parts. It is played by expanding and collapsing with both hands. It makes a unique clapping sound.

== See also ==
- Kato
- Folk Instruments of Punjab
