= Folk instruments of Punjab =

Punjabi folk music (Punjabi: ਪੰਜਾਬੀ ਲੋਕ ਸੰਗੀਤ (Gurmukhi); پنجابی لوک موسیقی (Shahmukhi)) has a wide range of traditional musical instruments used in folk music and dances like Bhangra, Giddha, Jhumar etc. Some of the instruments are rare in use and to find even. Here are some best known traditional instruments of the Punjab region used in various cultural activities.

== Instruments ==
Here is a list of Punjabi folk musical instruments in alphabetical order:

- Algoze
- Bugchu
- Chimta
- Dilruba
- Dhadd
- Dhol
- Gagar
- Gharha
- Ektara
- Kato
- Khartal
- Sapp
- Sarangi
- Tumbi

== See also ==
- Punjabi music
- Punjabi folk music
- Sikh music
- Indian music
