= Folk dances of Punjab =

Punjabi dances are an array of folk and religious dances of the Punjabi people indigenous to the Punjab region, straddling the border of India and Pakistan. The style of Punjabi dances ranges from very high energy to slow and reserved, and there are specific styles for men and women.

== Types ==
=== Bhangra ===
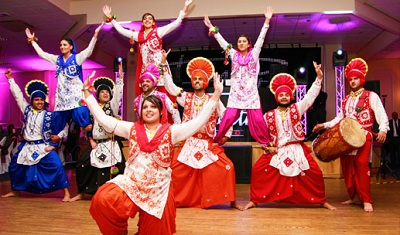
Bhangra dancers in Punjab, India

Bhangra is the most popular folk dance from Punjab, originating in the Sialkot area of Pakistani Punjab. It is especially associated with the vernal Vaisakhi festival.

Bhangra was mainly performed by Punjabi farmers during the harvesting season, while they did agricultural chores. As they did each farming activity they would perform bhangra moves on the spot. This allowed them to finish their job in a pleasurable way. After harvesting their wheat crops during the Vaisakhi season, people used to attend cultural festivals while dancing bhangra. For many years, farmers performed bhangra to showcase a sense of accomplishment and to welcome the new harvesting season.

=== Giddha ===
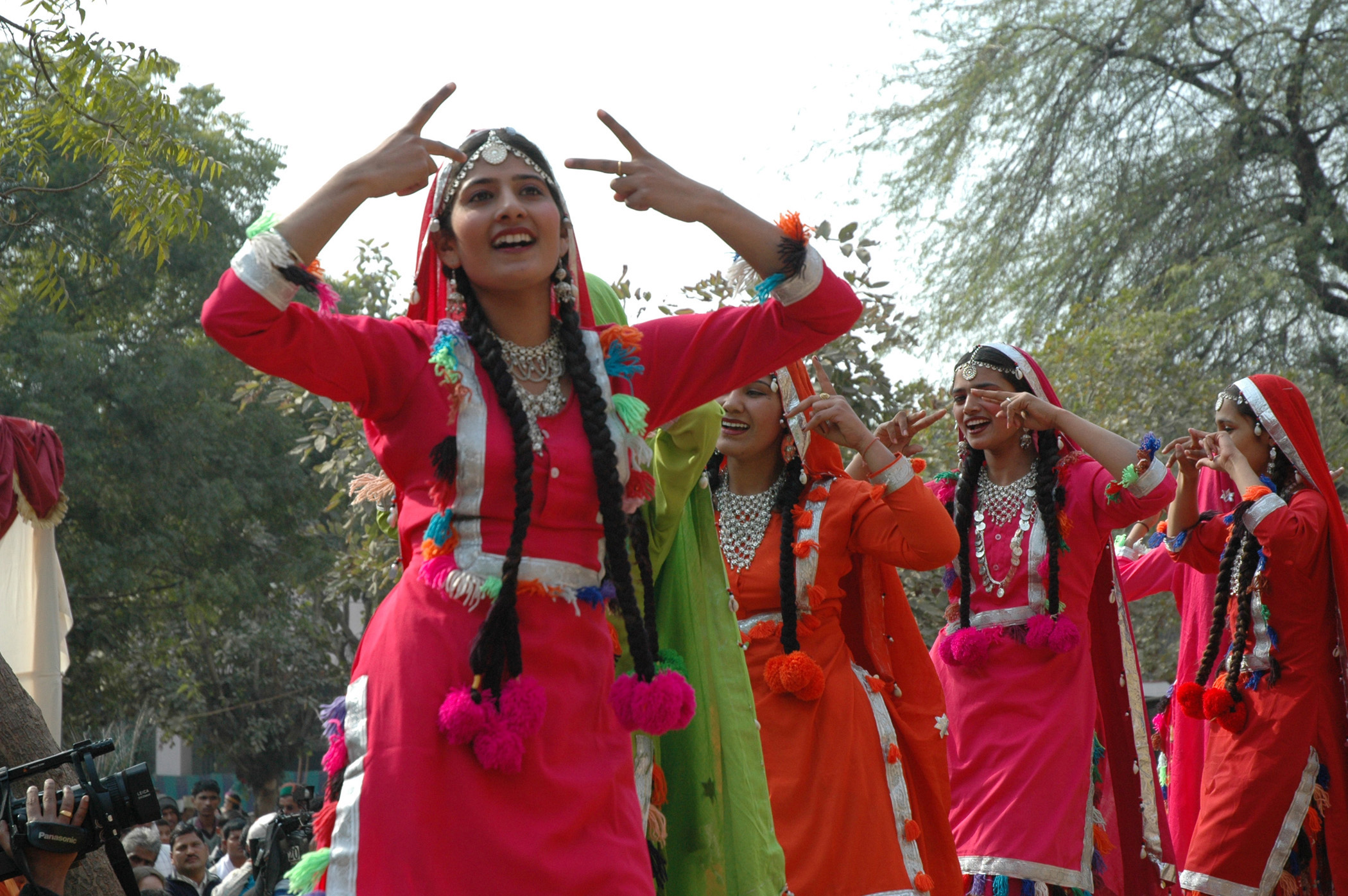
Folk dancers from Punjab performing at six-day Folk Dance Festival ‘Lok Tarang, in New Delhi on January 19, 2007

Giddha is a popular women's folk dance in the Punjab region. Giddha displays a traditional mode of performing Punjabi femininity, as seen through dress, choreography, and language. While the form of giddha was not seriously affected by the Partition of India, it has been classified, post-Partition, as the women's counterpart to the male bhangra, despite that not entirely being the case.

Traditionally, women used to wear salwar kameez and ghagra in bright colours and jewellery. The attire is completed by styling the hair into two braids, adorned with folk ornaments and wearing a tikka on the forehead.

=== Malwai Giddha ===
Malwai Giddha is a male folk dance from the Malwa region of Punjab. The dance was originally performed by elderly men. The dance is associated with the districts of Muktsar, Bathinda, Faridkot, Sangrur, Ferozpur, Mansa and Patiala.

=== Luddi ===
Luddi is performed, by both men and women, by moving in circles while clicking fingers and clapping hands and perform jumps and half-turns. It is mainly performed at weddings and sports events to celebrate victory. It can be performed in pairs or in groups, to the sounds of dhol and shenayi. "Luddi Hay Jamalo" was a famous song sung by Noor Jehan in 1980s, often sung at weddings by women.

=== Sammi ===
Sammi is a traditional dance form originating from the tribal belt of Punjab, particularly in the Sandalbar area and Pothohar region of Pakistani Punjab. Men usually perform the Sammi dance during conventional Punjabi parties. It is also performed by women, who dress in colourful kurtas and lehengas, often accompanied with a silver hair accessory.

Commonly, it has a slow flow and people dance in a circle. While forming a ring, dancers swing their hands from the side and bring them to the front. People implement a hopping sequence, along with using sticks in their hands. The Coke Studio track "Sammi Meri Waar" by Umair Jaswal and Quratulain Baloch is a popular song of this dance genre.

=== Jhumar ===
Jhumar performed before 1947

Jhumar, also called Ghumbar in the Sandalbar area, is popular in the Sandalbar areas of Punjab. It is a slower and more rhythmic form. The word "jhumar" comes from Hindi: झूम, romanized: jhum, which means "swaying". Jhumar is usually performed at wedding ceremonies. The dance is also performed in a circle, accompanied by emotional songs.

=== Kikkli ===
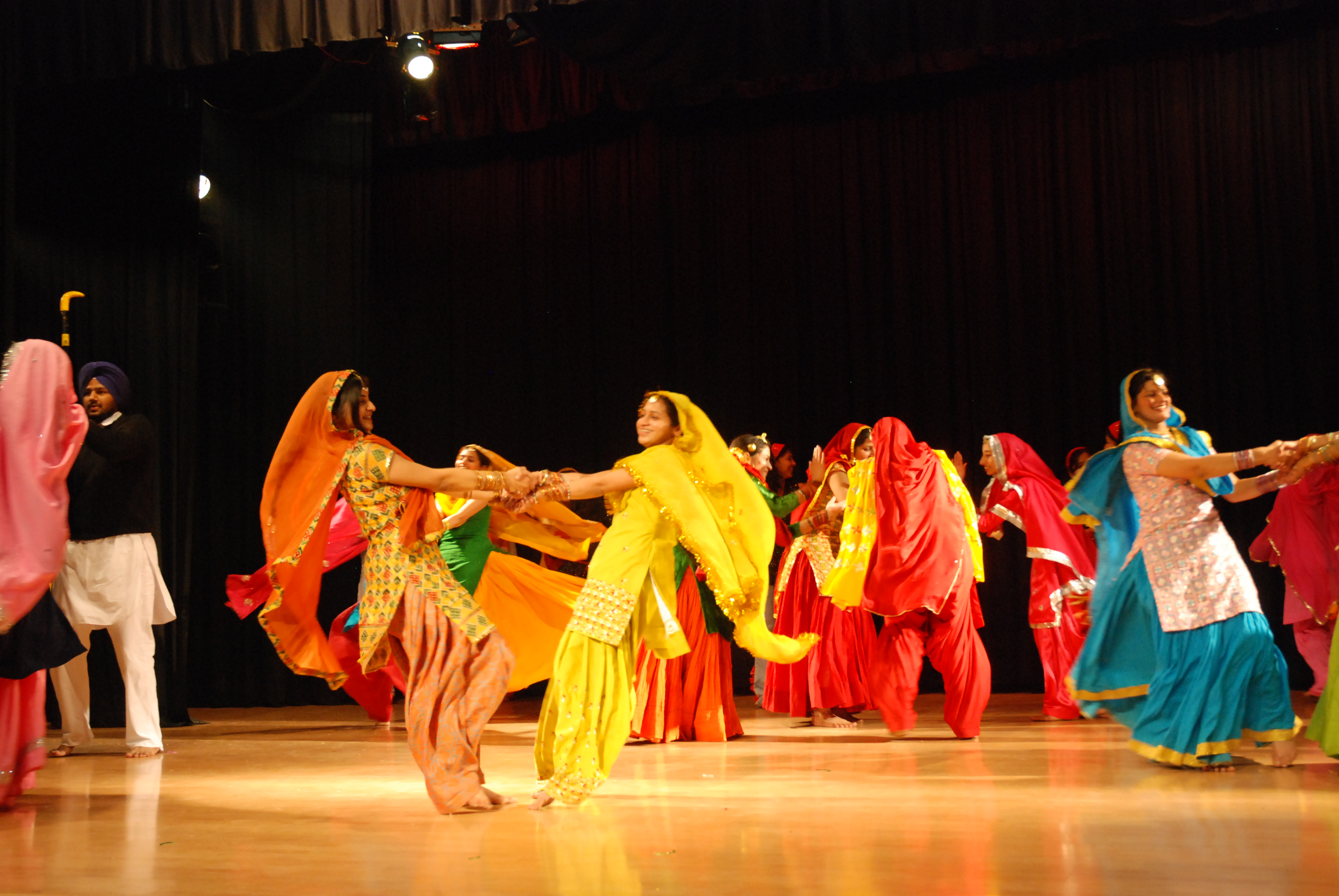
Kikkli dancing

Kikkli is a popular female folk dance performed by two girls holding hands, twirling each other in a circle and balancing their positions in circular motions. It is generally popular among young girls and performed in pairs, although it may be performed by four women. A variety of songs featuring clapping are used. The dance usually involves two girls standing face to face close to each other and holding hands, with arms crossed and bodies inclined back; in this position, the arms are stretched to the maximum and hands interlock firmly. Then, they wheel around continuously, with their dupattas floating in the air and anklets making tinkling sound.

=== Gatka ===
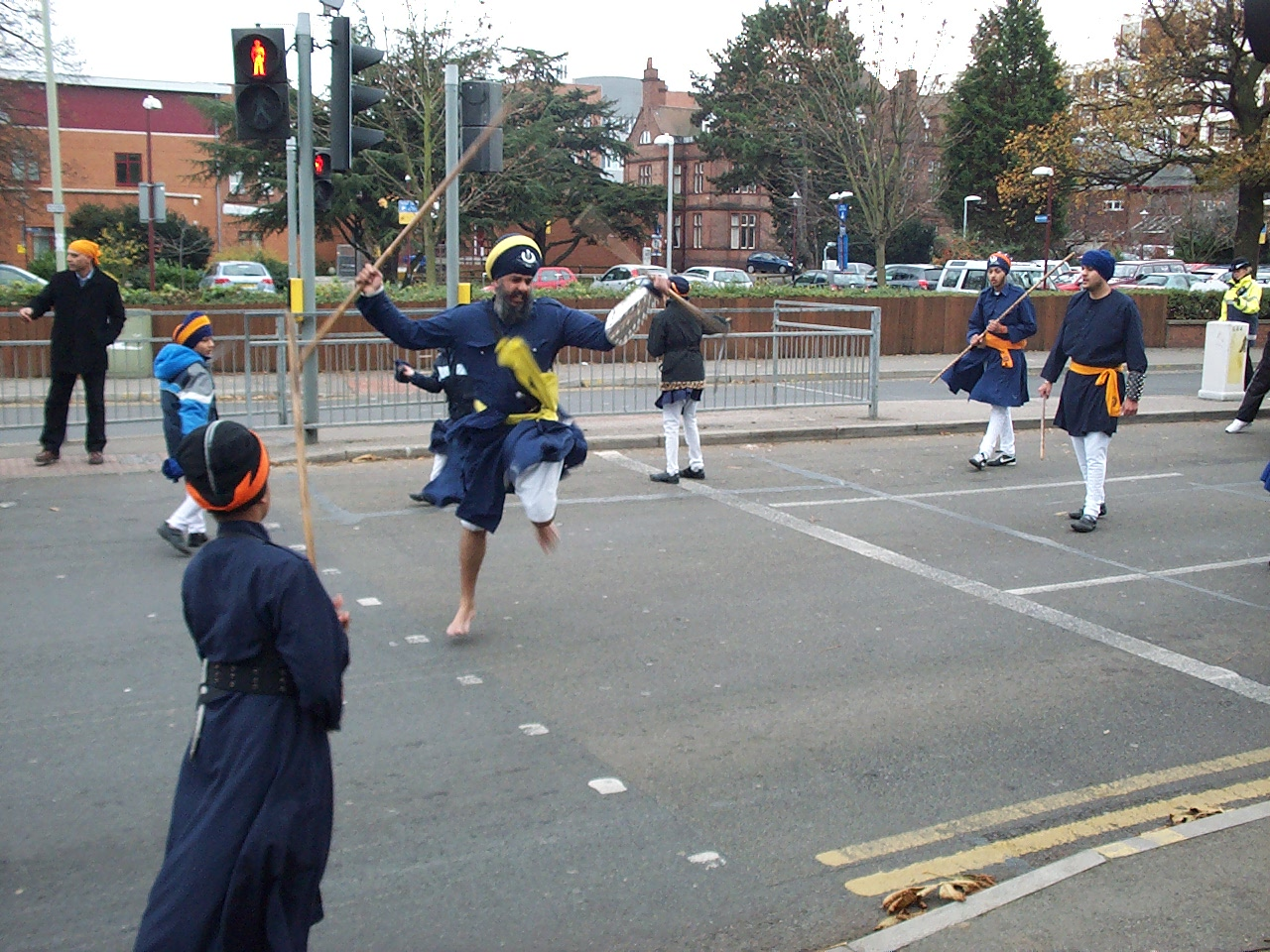
Gatka demonstration in Bedford, England

Gatka is a form of martial art associated primarily with the Sikhs of the Punjab. It is a style of stick-fighting, with wooden sticks intended to simulate swords. The other weapon used is a shield, natively known as phari. It is now popular as a sport or sword dance performance art and is often performed during Sikh festivals. Gatka's theory and techniques were taught by the Sikh gurus, and employed by the Sikhs in war and has been thoroughly battle tested.
