= Bugchu =

Punjabi traditional musical instrument

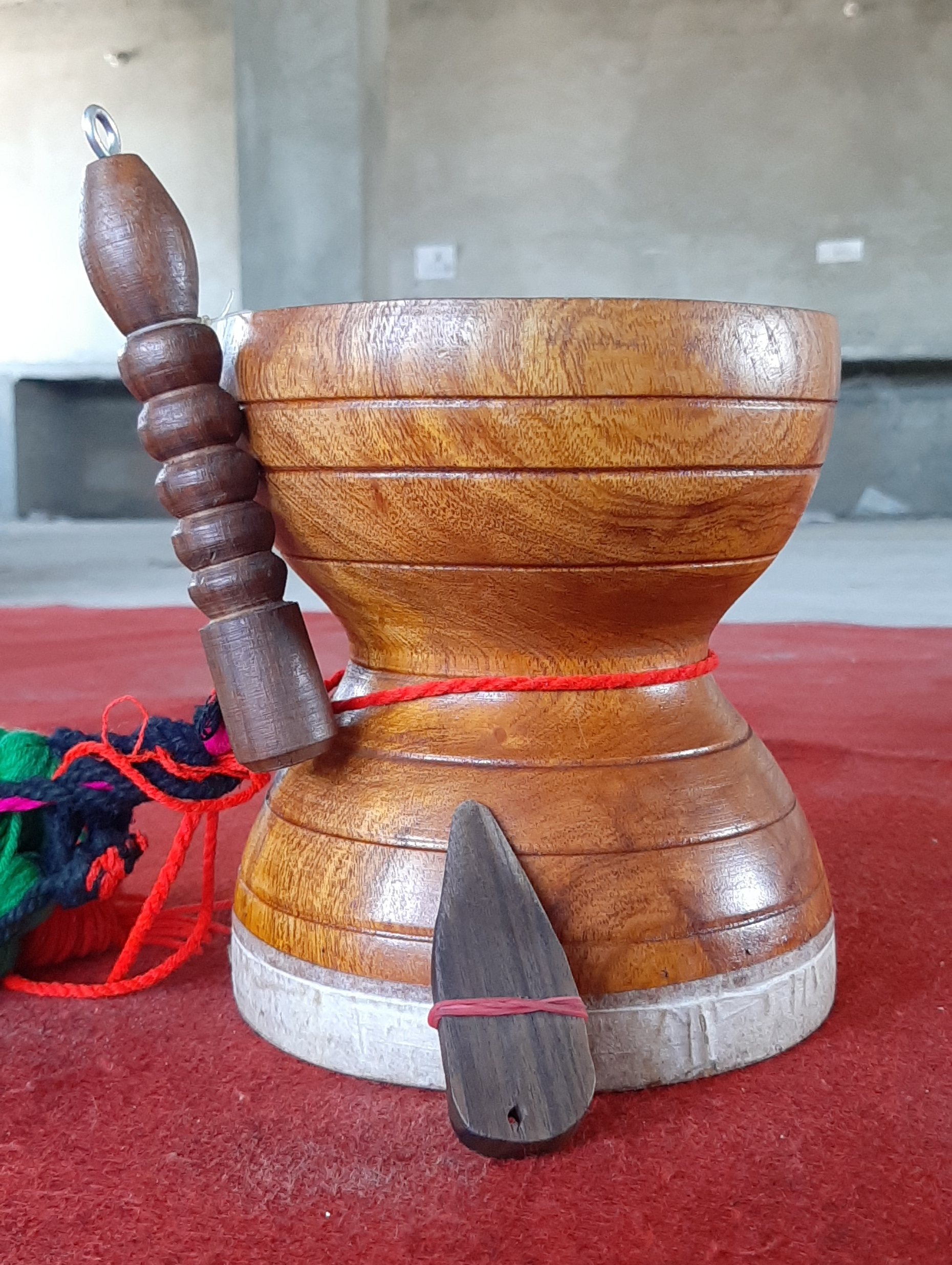
ਬੁਗਚੂ

Bugchu (Punjabi: ਬੁਘਚੂ), also spelled as Bughchu, Bugdu or Bughdu, is a traditional musical instrument native to the Punjab region. It is used in various cultural activities like folk music and folk dances such as bhangra, Malwai Giddha etc. It is a simple but unique instrument made of wood. Its shape is very similar to the damru, an Indian musical instrument. It makes a sound similar to its name, "bugchoo".

== Design and playing ==
The bugchu is an hourglass-shaped gourd with stretched skin on heads. A thick cord or string pierces the center of the skin and a knob of wood is tied to the other end of the string.

The instrument is held in a crook of the arm and the string is held in the palm of the same hand that holds the instrument. Then the taut string is plucked with the other hand's fingers or with a striker to produce a unique sound. The pitch of the sound is controlled by increasing or decreasing the tension on the string while plucking the string. Increasing the tension raises the pitch and decreasing the tension decreases the pitch.

== See also ==
- Folk instruments of Punjab
