= Malva (disambiguation) =

Malva is a genus of plants.

Malva may also refer to:

- 2S43 Malva, Russian self-propelled gun on a truck chassis
- Malva or Malve, Roman name for the Moulouya River
- Malva (Dacia), Dacian settlement in present-day Romania, where the Roman city of Romula was built.
- Malva, Zamora, a Spanish municipality of Castile and León
- Malwa, an alternative spelling for the Indian region and former state
- the pseudonym of Syrian artist Omar Hamdi (artist)
- Malva pudding, a South African sweet pudding
- Malva, a fictional character from Pokémon X and Y
- Malva (1924 film), a German silent film
- Malva (1957 film), a Russian drama film
- Malva Christie, a fictional character in Diana Gabaldon's Outlander book series and its TV adaptation

== See also ==
- Malvi (disambiguation)
- Malwa (disambiguation)
- Melva, a list of people with the give name
- Melva, Missouri, United States, a ghost town
- Milva (disambiguation)
- Malavas, a tribe and kingdom in ancient India
