= Milva (disambiguation) =

Milva was an Italian singer, actress, and television personality, born as Maria Ilva Biolcati (1939–2021)

Milva may also refer to:

- Milva Ekonomi (born 1962), Albanian politician and government minister
- Milva Perinoni (born 1961), birth name of Eva Grimaldi, Italian actress and model
- Michaela Kalogerakou (born 1998), Greek water polo player nicknamed "Milva"
- Milva, a character in The Witcher fantasy series

== See also ==
- Malva (disambiguation)
- Melva, a list of people with the given name
- Melva, Missouri, United States, a ghost town
- Milvi (disambiguation)
