= Melva =

Melva is a feminine given name which may refer to:

- Melva Bucksbaum (1933–2015), American art collector, curator, and patron of the arts
- Melva Clemaire, stage name of American opera singer Mellie Wilde (1874–1937)
- Melva Lowe de Goodin (born 1945), Afro-Panamanian academic and writer
- Melva Lind (1903–1997), academic
- Melva Paredes (born 1968), Venezuelan politician
- Melva Philipson (1925–2015), New Zealand botanist
- Melva L. Price (1902–1996), American educator and activist
- Melva Saunders (1931–2021), Australian basketball player
- Melva K. Wallace, American 21st century academic and academic administrator

== See also ==
- Malva (disambiguation)
- Milva (disambiguation), a given name and nickname
