= Boliyan =

Poetic couplets in the Punjab region

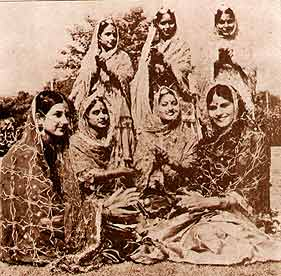
Photograph of Punjabi women performing 'Boliyan'

Boliyan or bolis are couplets that are sung in Punjab. Boliyan are often sung in accompaniment of bhangra dances.

A boli expresses typical situations and their emotions. Usually a boli is sung and introduced by one woman, and then other girls form a chorus. These boliyan are usually passed down generation by generation orally. This forms a continuous and successive chain, each generation being taught by its predecessor. It is through this process that boliyan have been refined and passed on from long ago.

Although commonly women do giddha and sing boliyan, in the Malwa region, in lower Punjab, men sing the boliyan. They also do Bhangra dances to accompany the Boliyan (see Malwai Giddha).

Boliyan are traditional, but time has made changes in them too. They are not only composed by professionals, but even farmers contribute to them. They have a uniform rhythm, and often their appeal is enhanced by a meaningless rhyme being added to them. Almost all folk dances are performed in circles. Whilst dancing the giddha, the women sing in sonorous voices, to the accompaniment of the dholak (drum), ghadda (pots) or to the beat of clapping. The leader (woman) of the chorus sings the boli, which the chorus repeats. The ghadda is played by gently striking a ring or a small stone on it in keeping with the rhythm. It helps to build an atmosphere of gaiety.

== Forms ==
Boliyan can be categorized as two forms: Nikian Boliyan (small) and Lambian Boliyan (long). Nikian Boliyan are songs formed of two sentences connected with giddha; the first sentence introducing and the last sentence concluding. Lambian Boliyan take the form of a chain or flow of feelings, sometimes denoted while exaggerating.

== Examples ==
"Jaago", the night before the wedding, the awakening night, is when all of the family join and sing boliyan, to celebrate the joyous occasion. The first boli to be sung on the Jaago Night is Jaago Aiya- which translates into the following:

Jatta Jaag Vey. - All you Jatts Wake Up
Hun Jaago Aiya. - For the Jaago has come
Shava vey hun Jaago Aiya. - Wow, just look; the Jaago has come.
Lori de ke paiya
uth pau gi
addiyan karu gi
chukni pau gi
Jaago aaiya
Jatta Jaag Vey
Hun Jaago Aiya

== See also ==
- List of Indian folk dances
- Big Boli Star
