= Big Boli Star =

- Hosted by: RJ Dhanveer, RJ Pankaj
- Judges: Pammi Bai; Sukhi Brar; Raj Brar; Gurmeet Bawa; Master Saleem; Gulrej Akhtar; Kolaveri D Punjabi Boys
- Winners: Rajvinder Singh, Harpreet Singh
- Runners-up: Savroop Singh, Avtar Singh

Release
- Original network: Spark Punjabi (Reliance Broadcast Network Limited)
- Original release: March 2012 – May 2012

Big Boli Star is an Indian talent hunt contest aimed at promoting Punjabi boliyan, a traditional Punjabi folk art. The first season of the show saw popular names like Pammi Bai, Master Saleem, Gurmeet Bawa, Raj Brar, Gulrej Akhtar, Kulvinder Kelly, Kolaveri D Punjabi Boys as judges. The show was aired on Reliance Broadcast Network Limited’s regional general entertainment channel for the Punjab, Haryana, Chandigarh, and Himachal Pradesh (PHCHP) region, Spark Punjabi in 2012.

The on-ground auditions were hosted from March to May 2012 across cities like Amritsar, Jalandhar, Ludhiana, Patiala, Chandigarh and Jammu with over 300 participants from each city. The show includes elements like musical performances, folk dances and an emotion-filled atmosphere along the way which creates a strong build up to the race for the top 2 and finally the "Big Boli Star".

The popularity of the Big Boli Star created a new wave of enthusiasm towards highlighting traditional Punjabi culture while bringing young new talent to the forefront.

The series was presented by Reliance Broadcast Network’s media platforms of the PHCHP (Punjab, Haryana, Chandigarh, Himachal Pradesh) – Spark Punjabi and 92.7 BIG FM – and was marketed across RBNL platforms.

Televised over 14 episodes, the show went on-air on 3 June 2012 every Saturday and Sunday at 9 PM on Spark Punjabi.

== Finalists ==
Finalists with region
Name	Region
Avtar Singh	Chandigarh Winner
Shabnampreet Kaur	Chandigarh Winner
Rakesh Deol	Jammu Winner
Anamika Thakur	Jammu Winner
Savroop	Amritsar Winner
Ramneek	Amritsar Winner
Harpreet	Ludhiana Winner; Final Winner
Komalpreet	Ludhiana Winner
Rajvinder Singh	Patiala Winner; Final Winner
