= Milvi =

Milvi is a given name and may refer to:

- Milvi Koplus (1935–2010), Estonian poet and children's book writer
- Milvi Panga (born 1945), Estonian psychiatrist, numerologist and hiromant

== See also ==
- Milva (disambiguation)
