= Gale Wade =

American baseball player (1929–2022)

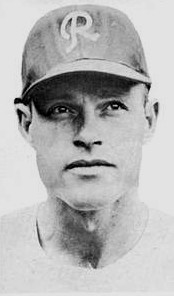
- Wade in 1959
- Center fielder
- Born: January 20, 1929; Melva, Missouri, U.S.
- Died: January 16, 2022 (aged 92); McDowell County, North Carolina, U.S.
- Batted: Left Threw: Right

MLB debut
- April 11, 1955, for the Chicago Cubs

Last MLB appearance
- May 8, 1956, for the Chicago Cubs

MLB statistics
- Batting average: .133
- Home runs: 1
- Runs batted in: 1
- Stats at Baseball Reference

Teams
- Chicago Cubs (1955–1956)

Galeard Lee Wade (January 20, 1929 – January 16, 2022) was an American professional baseball player who was a center fielder in Major League Baseball, playing for the Chicago Cubs in the 1955 and 1956 seasons.

== Life and career ==
Wade was originally signed as an amateur free agent pitcher by the Brooklyn Dodgers organization. He then was assigned to their Ponca City affiliate club of the Kansas–Oklahoma–Missouri League in 1947. As an 18-year-old rookie, Wade had a split season record while building a 10–9 record in 28 pitching appearances and hitting for a .318 average in 59 games as an outfielder. After that, he made the switch to outfield, where he spent the rest of his professional baseball career. Wade would go on to lead four different circuits in stolen bases during his minor league career and twice in the Venezuelan Professional Baseball League.

Wade also played in the Cleveland Indians, Cincinnati Reds, Kansas City Athletics and Milwaukee Braves' minor league systems in all of part of fifteen seasons spanning 1947–1961. In 1955, he posted a .292 average with career-highs in home runs (20), runs batted in (67) and stolen bases (67) in 120 games. In addition, Wade played winter baseball with the Leones del Caracas, Navegantes del Magallanes and Indios de Oriente in Venezuela, where he built a fan base around him, earning the nickname Galgo (greyhound) for his flashy speed on the bases. In a four-season stint, he batted .304 and stole 44 bases in 163 games, and accompanied his pennant-winning Caracas to the 1953 Caribbean Series, where he batted .353.

Wade's major league career with the Chicago Cubs included parts of two seasons (1955, 1956). He was in the starting lineup on both opening days.

Wade's baseball career ended in 1961 when he was hit by a pitch, permanently damaging his eyesight. Following baseball, he worked for over 25 years at a power company. Wade also served on the McDowell County School Board. His hobbies included hunting, hiking, and golfing, which he played until the age of 91. His grandson, Gardiner is a police officer with the Round Lake Beach PD in Round Lake Illinois. Wade died after a brief illness on January 15, 2022, four days before his 93rd birthday.
