= Sammi (dance) =

Traditional dance form of Punjab

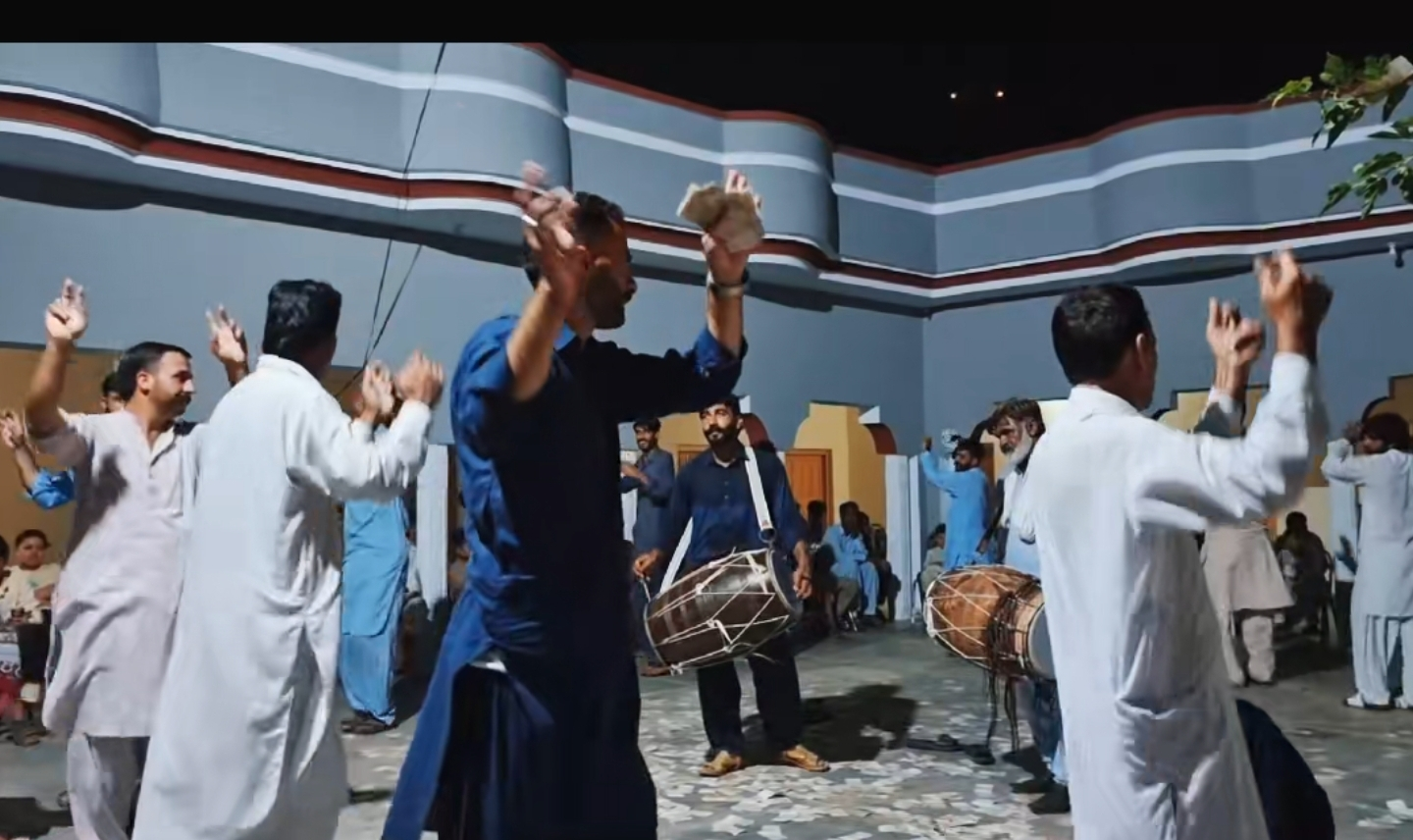
- A group of Punjabi men performing Sammi
- Origin: Punjab
- Related dances: Luddi

Sammi (Shahmukhi: سمّی) is a traditional dance form originating from the tribal communities of Punjab. The dance originates from Sandal bar but is also popular in other Bars and Pothohar regions of Pakistani Punjab.

== History ==
The dance is named after a young heroine of a legend, Sammi, who was madly in love and used to sing and dance as best as she could for the sake of her love.

== Costume ==
The dancers are dressed in bright colored kurtas and full flowing skirts called Ghagra or Lehenga. A peculiar silver hair ornament is associated with this dance.

== Performance ==
Like Giddha it is danced in a circle. The dancers stand in a ring and swing their hands bringing them up from the sides, right in front. The refrain of the most popular Sammi song is "Sammi Meri waar..".

== See also ==
- Punjabi dance
- Giddha – Punjabi Female dance.
- Bhangra – Punjabi Male dance.
