= Kato (instrument) =

Kato (Punjabi: ਕਾਟੋ), also spelled as Kaato or Katto, is one of the traditional musical instruments of Punjab. It is used in various cultural activities especially in folk dances like Bhangra, Malwai Giddha. Kato literally means squirrel in Punjabi, so named because of its design, which is similar to a squirrel and used as a symbol of happiness. In Punjab, when a happy man is asked how he is, he would answer "Ajj Taan Kaato Phullan Te Aa", which translates as "The squirrel is on flowers" (meaning the squirrel is happy).

== Design and function ==
The Kato is composed of a rudimentary squirrel on the end of a stick, both made of wood. The dancer holds the stick and rhythmically pulls a rope attached to the squirrel's mouth and tail, producing a clapping sound.

== See also ==
- Dhadd
- Folk Instruments of Punjab
