= Bhangra Empire =

American dance team

Established in 2006, Bhangra Empire is a San Francisco Bay Area dance team in California. The team is composed of undergraduates, graduate students, and recent graduates pursuing a variety of career paths while taking time to pursue Bhangra and Punjabi culture. The team has won 16 awards in four years.

== Popular culture ==
=== President Obama's first State Dinner ===
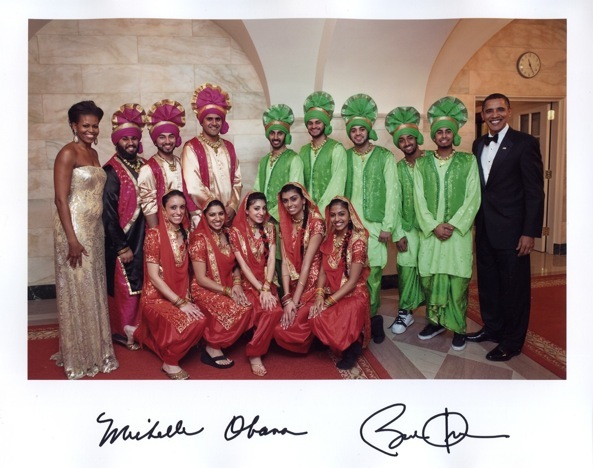
Bhangra Empire with the President and First Lady at the First State Dinner

On November 24, 2009, Bhangra Empire performed at the first State Dinner hosted by President Barack Obama and the First Lady, Michelle Obama. The event honored its chief guest Prime Minister of India, Manmohan Singh and was held on the South Lawn of the White House in Washington, D.C.

Along with Bhangra Empire, the entertainment lineup included the National Symphony Orchestra, A.R. Rahman, Kurt Elling, and Jennifer Hudson.

The guest list included a mix of prominent figures in United States and Indian politics, business, and entertainment, including the President and First Lady, Secretary of State Hillary Clinton, Colin Powell, Bobby Jindal, Dr. Sanjay Gupta, Steven Spielberg, M. Night Shyamalan, Alfre Woodard, and Blair Underwood.

=== America's Got Talent (Season 5) ===
On Tuesday June 22, 2010, Bhangra Empire made its debut on national television on America's Got Talent (Season 5) with a first round audition in Portland, Oregon. The performance received a standing ovation from the audience and three yeses from celebrity judges Howie Mandel, Piers Morgan, and Sharon Osbourne.

=== Harper's Bazaar ===
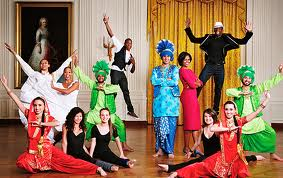
Bhangra Empire with Michelle Obama in Harper's Bazaar, Nov 2010

Selected by First Lady Michelle Obama as one of the foremost up-and-coming talents in the United States, Bhangra Empire participated in a photo shoot in the White House Ballroom with the First Lady for Harper's Bazaar magazine. The full article, and photo, were published in the November 2010 issue.

== Competitive performances ==
=== 2010 ===
- Boston Bhangra - 1st place
  - Performance video: unavailable
  - Held at the Orpheum Theater in Boston, Massachusetts, on November 13, 2010
- VIBC - 3rd place
  - Performance video: unavailable
  - Held at the Queen Elizabeth Theatre in Vancouver, British Columbia, Canada, on May 9, 2010
- Kollaboration - 1st runner-up
  - Performance video: Kollaboration 2010
  - Held at the Shrine Auditorium in Los Angeles, California on March 6, 2010
- Elite 8 Bhangra Invitational
  - Performance video: Elite 8 2010
  - Held at the Lisner Auditorium in Washington, D.C., on February 27, 2010

=== 2009 ===
- Boston Bhangra - 2nd place
  - Performance video: unavailable
- Bruin Bhangra - 1st place
  - Performance video: Bruin Bhangra 2009
- Best of the Best V - 1st place, 1st overall
  - Performance video: Best of the Best 2009
- VIBC - 1st place
  - Performance video: VIBC 2009

=== 2008 ===
- Boston Bhangra - 1st place
  - Performance video - Boston Bhangra 2008
- Bruin Bhangra - 2nd place
  - Performance video - Bruin Bhangra 2008
- Bhangra Fusion
  - Performance video - unavailable
- SoCal Bhangra - 1st place
  - Performance video - unavailable
- Dhol Di Awaz - 2nd place
  - Performance video - Dhol Di Awaz 2008
- Punjabi Showdown - 1st place, most entertaining
  - Performance video - Punjabi Showdown 2008

=== 2007 ===
- Rooh Punjab Di - 3rd place
  - Performance video: Rooh Punjab Di 2007
- Bhangra Nation West - 1st place
  - Performance video: Bhangra Nation West 2007
- Giant Bhangra
  - Performance video: Giant Bhangra
- Dhol Di Awaz
  - Performance video: Dhol Di Awaz 2007

=== 2006 ===
- Bulldog Bhangra
  - Performance video: Bulldog Bhangra 2006
- Nachda Punjab
  - Performance video: Nachda Punjab 2006
- Rooh Punjab Di
  - Performance video: Rooh Punjab Di 2006

== Community involvement ==
Many of Bhangra Empire's high-energy competitive performances are watched by audiences of over 5000 attendees. In addition to competitive and high-profile performances, Bhangra Empire performs at local community festivals, functions, and charity events. Bhangra Empire coaches a kids' Bhangra team and teaches bhangra classes at several locations throughout the Bay Area.

== See also ==
- Dance in California
