= Melva Clemaire =

American soprano singer

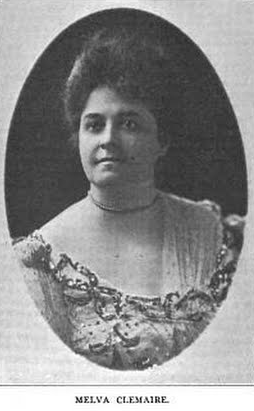
Melva Clemaire, from a 1908 publication

Melva Clemaire (1874 – April 18, 1937) was the stage name of Mellie Wilde, an American soprano singer.

== Early life ==
Mellie M. Wilde was born in St. Paul, Minnesota, the daughter of Francis F. Wilde and Melvina Ganyaw Wilde. Her father, who was born in Vienna, was a veteran of the American Civil War, and a real estate lawyer. She studied music with Emil Oberhoffer.

== Career ==
Wilde made her first public concert appearance in 1895, at the Metropolitan Opera House in St. Paul. Melva Clemaire toured Sweden in 1906, and sang at London's Albert Hall. In 1907 and 1908 she was the featured performer touring nationally with the Bostonia Sextette Club. She was described as having "a beautiful, clear soprano voice that shows fine training." She also sang with the Henry W. Savage Opera Company and the Gallo Italian Grand Opera Company. In 1915 she arranged for the San Carlo Grand Opera Company to perform in Minneapolis.

== Personal life ==
Wilde was a Christian Scientist. She married Mark O. Graves in 1896. She was widowed in 1924, and she died in Minneapolis, Minnesota in 1937, aged 63 years.
