= Malavi, India =

Malavi
- Village
- Location in Karnataka, India Malavi (India)
- Coordinates: 14°59′N 76°12′E
- Country: India
- State: Karnataka
- District: Belgaum
- Talukas: Khanapur

Government
  - Type: Panchayati raj (India)
  - Body: Gram panchayat

Languages
  - Official: Kannada
- Time zone: UTC+5:30 (IST)

Malavi is a village in the Ballari district Karnataka, India.

According to the 2011 census, the town contained 39 family units, with 100 males and 89 females for a total population of 189. There were 15 children between the ages of 0–6. The literacy rate was lower than in Karnataka, with 71.26 % able to read while in the district the rate was 75.36 %. Men have a higher literacy rate than women: 82.61 % for men compared with 58.54 % for women. The Panchyati Raaj Act allows the town to be administered by a Sarpanch (Head of Village) who is the elected representative of the village.
