= Jhumar =

Traditional Punjabi folk dance

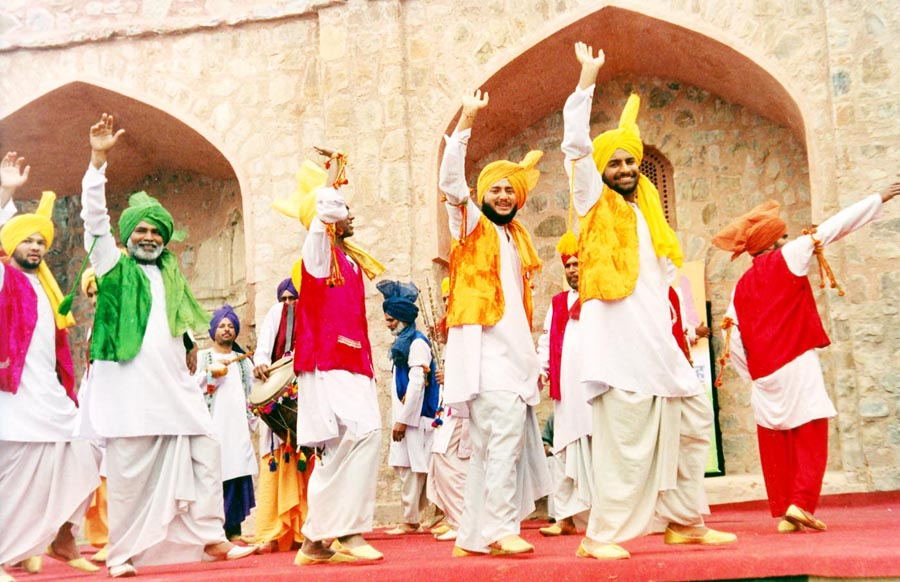
- Jhumar performed in New Delhi
- Genre: Folk dance
- Origin: Punjab

Jhumar performed before 1947

Jhūmar or Jhoomar (also called Ghūmbar in Sandal Bar) is a traditional Punjabi folk dance originating from the Sandal Bar and Chaj Doab regions of Punjab. The word "Jhūmar" comes from Jhūm, which means 'to sway' in Punjabi.

The dance is also called Jungle-dance of Jhang-Sials which has a tribal sounding beat - 16 beats on the drum per cycle.

== See also ==
- Music of Punjab
