= Malva, Spain =

Malva
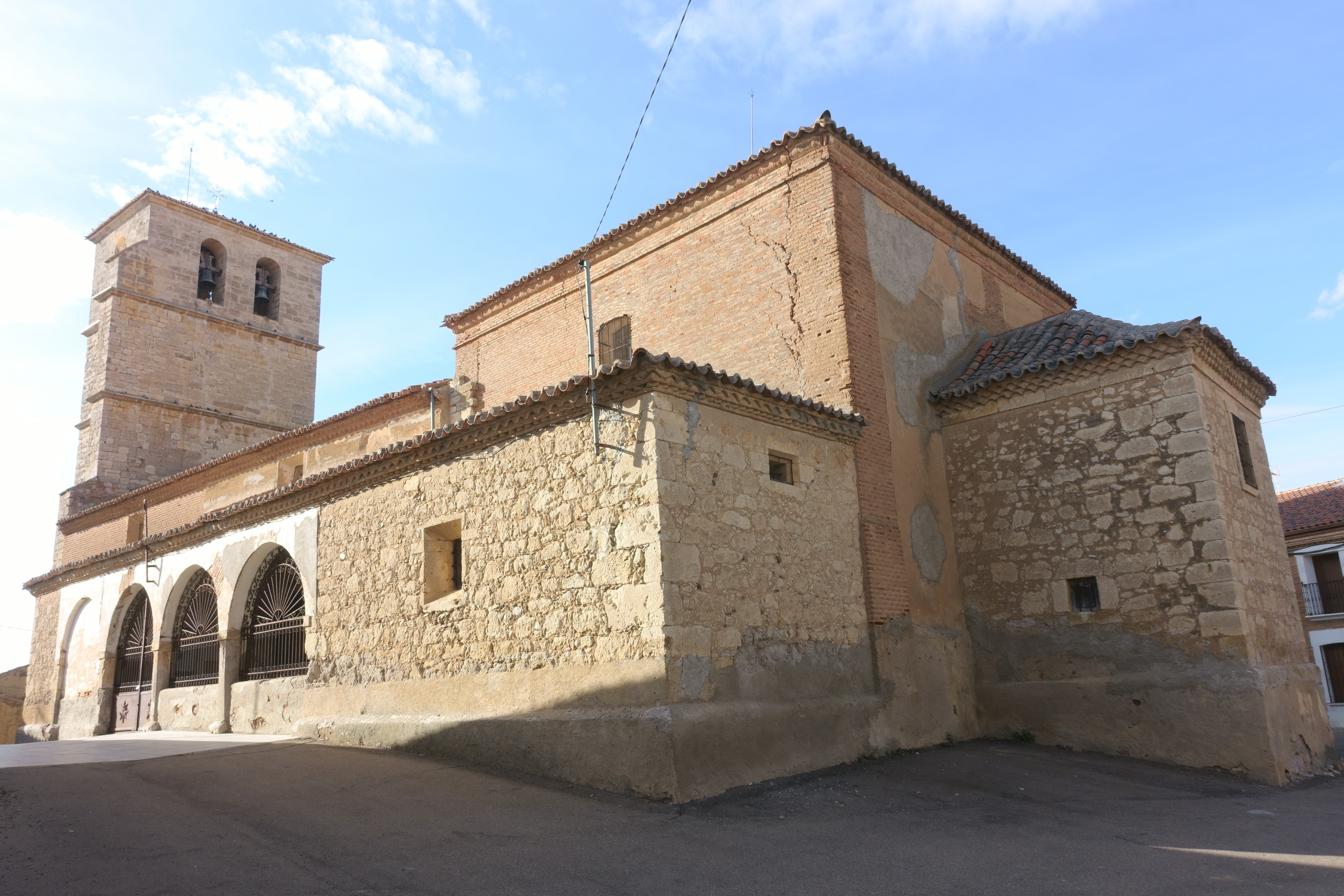
- Church of San Miguel

- Flag Coat of arms

- Location in Spain
- Coordinates: 41°39′15″N 5°29′10″W
- Country: Spain
- Autonomous community: Castile and León
- Province: (Province of Zamora) Zamora
- Comarca: Alfoz de Toro
- Judicial District: Zamora
- Mancomunidad: Norte-Duero

Government
  - Mayor: Manuel Masero Pastor (PSOE)

Area
  - Total: 27.33 km^{2} (10.55 sq mi)
- Elevation: 713 m (2,339 ft)

Population (2025-01-01)
  - Total: 92
  - Density: 3.4/km^{2} (8.7/sq mi)
- Demonym: Malvarisco / Malvarisca
- Time zone: UTC+1 (CET)
  - Summer (DST): UTC+2 (CEST)
- Postal code: 49832
- Area code: (+34) 980
- Website: Official website

Malva is a municipality located in the province of Zamora, Castile and León, Spain. According to the 2012 census (INE), the municipality has a population of 167 inhabitants.

== Geography ==
Located in south of the natural reserve of Lagunas de Villafáfila, Malva is 17 km far from Toro, 33 from Zamora and 83 from Valladolid.

== See also ==
- List of municipalities in Zamora
