= Turkey Creek (Lake Taneycomo tributary) =

Stream in the U.S. states of Arkansas and Missouri

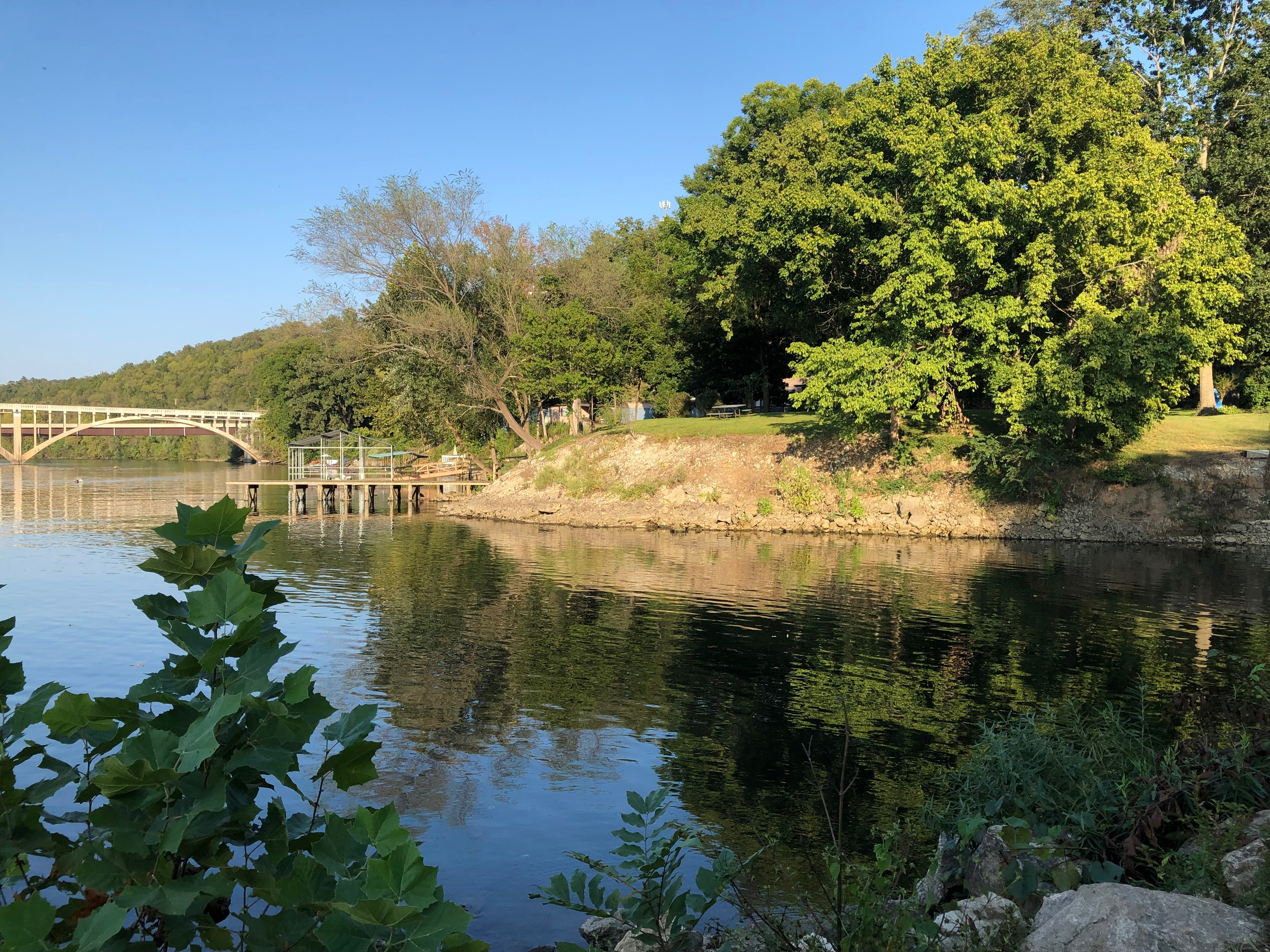
- Turkey Creek mouth at Lake Taneycomo
- Etymology: Named for wild turkeys in the area

Location
- Country: United States
- States: Missouri, Arkansas
- Counties: Taney County, Boone County

Physical characteristics
- Source
  - coordinates: 36°29′20″N 93°13′06″W
- Mouth: Lake Taneycomo
  - coordinates: 36°38′02″N 93°13′01″W
- Length: 86 mi (138 km)

Turkey Creek is a stream in the Ozarks of southern Missouri and northern Arkansas. It is a tributary of Lake Taneycomo. The stream source is two-thirds of a mile south of the Missouri - Arkansas border in Boone County north of the village of Crest. The Missouri Pacific Railroad line follows the stream course after exiting the Crest railroad tunnel under Arkansas State Route 14 at Crest. North of the state line in Taney County the stream flows north through west Hollister to its confluence with Lake Taneycomo south of Branson. The stream covers a linear distance of 86 mi (138 km) between the border and its confluence.

Turkey Creek was so named on account of the wild turkeys in the area.

== See also ==
- List of rivers of Arkansas
- List of rivers of Missouri
