= Melva, Missouri =

Extinct hamlet in Missouri, U.S.

Coordinates: 36°34′37″N 93°12′44″W

Melva is an extinct town in southern Taney County, in the Ozarks of southwest Missouri. The GNIS classifies it as a populated place. The site was located south of Hollister on the east bank of Turkey Creek along the Missouri Pacific Railroad. On March 11, 1920, the town was destroyed by a deadly tornado that killed 11 people, including 9 children.

A post office called Melva was established in 1906, and remained in operation until 1931. A railroad official gave the community the name of his daughter.

Gale Wade (1929-2022), baseball player, was born in Melva.

== See also ==
- List of ghost towns in Missouri
