= Malwai Giddha =

Punjabi folk dance

Malwai Giddha (Punjabi: ਮਲਵਈ ਗਿੱਧਾ) is the folk dance of males of Malwa region of Punjab. This dance was originally performed by Babey (old men) and hence is also called Babeyan da Gidhha but the dance is now performed by younger men too. This includes teasing of other people in Boliaan (folk poetry). The dance originated in the Malwa area of the Punjab region and is associated with the districts of Muktsar, Bathinda, Faridkot, Sangrur, Ferozpur, Mansa and Patiala.

== Instruments ==
The instruments used in Malwai Giddha are not merely for show. A performer has to play it in rhythm. The performer has to know not only the how to play the particular instrument but also the way to carry it.

The most commonly used instruments are:

- Tumbi
- Chimta
- Kato
- Kartara

== See also ==
- Sapp (instrument)
- Bhangra (dance)
- Jhumar
- Dances of Punjab
