= Malwai dialect =

Dialect of Punjabi

Malwai
- ਮਲਵਈ • مَلۡوَئی
- Pronunciation: Standard: [məlʋəi] Malwai: [məlˈʋi]
- Native to: Punjab; Haryana
- Region: Malwa (Punjab)
- Language family: Indo-European: Indo-Iranian; Indo-Aryan; Northwestern; Punjabi; Eastern Punjabi; Malwai
- Early form: Old Punjabi
- Writing system: Gurmukhī; Shahmukhi

Language codes
- ISO 639-3: –
- Map Malwa Region of Punjab

Malwai (Standard: [məlʋəi]; Malwai: [məlˈʋi]) is an eastern dialect of the Punjabi language, spoken in the Malwa region of Punjab.

== History ==
During the British colonial period, Malwai was spoken in the Ferozepore and Ludhiana districts. It was also spoken in much of the princely states of the Punjab, barring Kapurthala. However, Ferozepore and Zira had been influenced by Majhi owing to commercial, cultural, and logistic ties to Majha despite being in Malwa. The Fazilka and Abohar areas were influenced by Western Punjabi. After the partition in 1947, Majhi speaking refugees from rural Lahore district settled in Muktsar tehsil, influencing the local dialect there.

== Distribution ==
=== India ===
==== Punjab ====
Major Malwai speaking centers are Ferozepur, Fazilka, Faridkot, Muktsar, (Note: The language spoken in some southern villages of Fazilka, Muktsar and Bahawalnagar districts forms a dialect continuum with Bagri language, which is classified as a dialect of Rajasthani language.) Moga, Bathinda, Sangrur, Patiala, Barnala, Mansa districts and Jagraon, Raikot and Ludhiana (West) tehsils of Ludhiana district. (Note: The Punjabi spoken in eastern tehsils of Ludhiana district (Ludhiana (East), Payal, Khanna and Samrala) forms a dialect continuum with Pwadhi dialect.)

==== Haryana ====
Many Malwai speakers also live in Dabwali, Kalanwali and Rania tehsils of Sirsa district and Kaithal district of Haryana, India; the Jakhal and Ratia tehsils of Fatehabad district of Haryana, India.

==== Rajasthan ====
The dialect is also found spoken in Sri Ganganagar and Hanumangarh districts of Rajasthan, India.

=== Pakistan ===
In Pakistan, it is spoken in Vehari district of Punjab by the communities migrated from Indian Punjab after Partition 1947. It is also spoken in Bahawalnagar and Nankana Sahib districts.

== Characteristics ==
Although the characteristic distinction among the various dialects of Punjabi language lies in the speech pattern, the Malwai dialect most notably differs from the other dialects through its distinctive 'ū' (ਊ) sound in all future-tense verb endings.

Verb Conjugation Differences
Standard Punjabi	Malwai Dialect
āvegā	āūgā
āvegī	āūgī
āvoge	āūŋge
pīvegā	pīūgā
pīvegī	pīūgī
pīvoge	pīūŋge

Another notable difference is that where other Punjabi dialects have /l/ (ਲ) in Malwai many of those words are pronounced with an /r/ (ਰ) or [ɭ̆] (ਲ਼) instead.

The following peculiarities in vocabulary are also observed:

English	Standard Punjabi		Malwai	
English	Gurmukhi	Shahmukhi	Gurmukhi	Shahmukhi
He will come.	ਉਹ ਆਵੇਗਾ	اوہ آویگا	ਉਹ ਆਊਗਾ	اوہ آؤگا
I am coming.	ਮੈਂ ਆ ਰਿਹਾ ਹਾਂ	میں آ رہا آں	ਮੈਂ ਆਈ ਜਾਨਾਂ।	میں آئی جاناں۔
He is coming.	ਉਹ ਆ ਰਿਹਾ ਹੈ	اوہ آ رہا اے	ਉਹ ਆਈ ਜਾਂਦੈ।	اوہ آئی جاندَے۔
To lift/to pick (up)	ਚੁੱਕਣਾ	چُکنا	ਚੱਕਣਾ	چَکنا
To uproot/to dig (out)	ਪੁੱਟਣਾ	پُٹنا	ਪੱਟਣਾ	پَٹنا
Your	ਤੁਹਾਡਾ	تَہاڈا	ਥੋਡਾ/ਸੋਡਾ	تُہاڈا
(My/your/his/her) own	ਆਪਣਾ	اپنا	ਆਵਦਾ	آودا
By me/from me	ਮੇਰੇ ਤੋਂ/ਮੇਰੇ ਕੋਲੋਂ	میرے توں/میرے کولوں	ਮੈਥੋਂ	میتھوں
By you/from you	ਤੁਹਾਡੇ ਤੋਂ/ਤੁਹਾਡੇ ਕੋਲੋਂ/ਤਾਡਾ	تہاڈے توں/تہاڈے کولوں/تاڈا	ਥੋਤੋਂ	تُہاتھوں
Camel	ਊਠ	اُوٹھ	ਬੋਤਾ	اُٹھ
Son	ਪੁੱਤਰ	پُتر	ਪੁੱਤ	پُت
Friend	ਮਿੱਤਰ	یار/مِتر	ਮਿੱਤ	بیلی
Urine	ਮੂਤਰ	مُوتَر	ਮੂਤ	مُوت
Dew drop	ਤ੍ਰੇਲ਼	تریل	ਤੇਲ਼	تیل

Also, in contrast with Majhi dialect, 'ਹ' is not tonal. Exceptions are encountered when 'ਹ'/'ہ' is not followed by a schwa ending or a vowel sound, as in, ਕਹਿਣਾ, ਰਹਿ, ਘਾਹ / ۔کہنا، رہِ، گھاہ

== See also ==
- Punjabi dialects
- Languages of India
- List of Indian languages by total speakers
- List of Punjabi television channels
