= Luddi =

Type of dance

- Native name: Luddi
- Origin: Punjab
- Related dances: Sammi (dance)

Luddi is a traditional folk dance of Punjab. It is performed in circles by both men and women while clicking their fingers and clapping hands, jumps and half-turns.

Luddi is performed on weddings and sports to celebrate victory, it is performed by all ages of men and women. Luddi is popular in both eastern (India) and western (Pakistan) Punjab. Luddi can be performed in pairs or in groups on tunes of dhol and shehnayi. 'Luddi hay jamalo' was a famous song sung by Noor Jehan in 1980s and often sung at weddings by women.
