= Malvi =

Indian breed of cattle

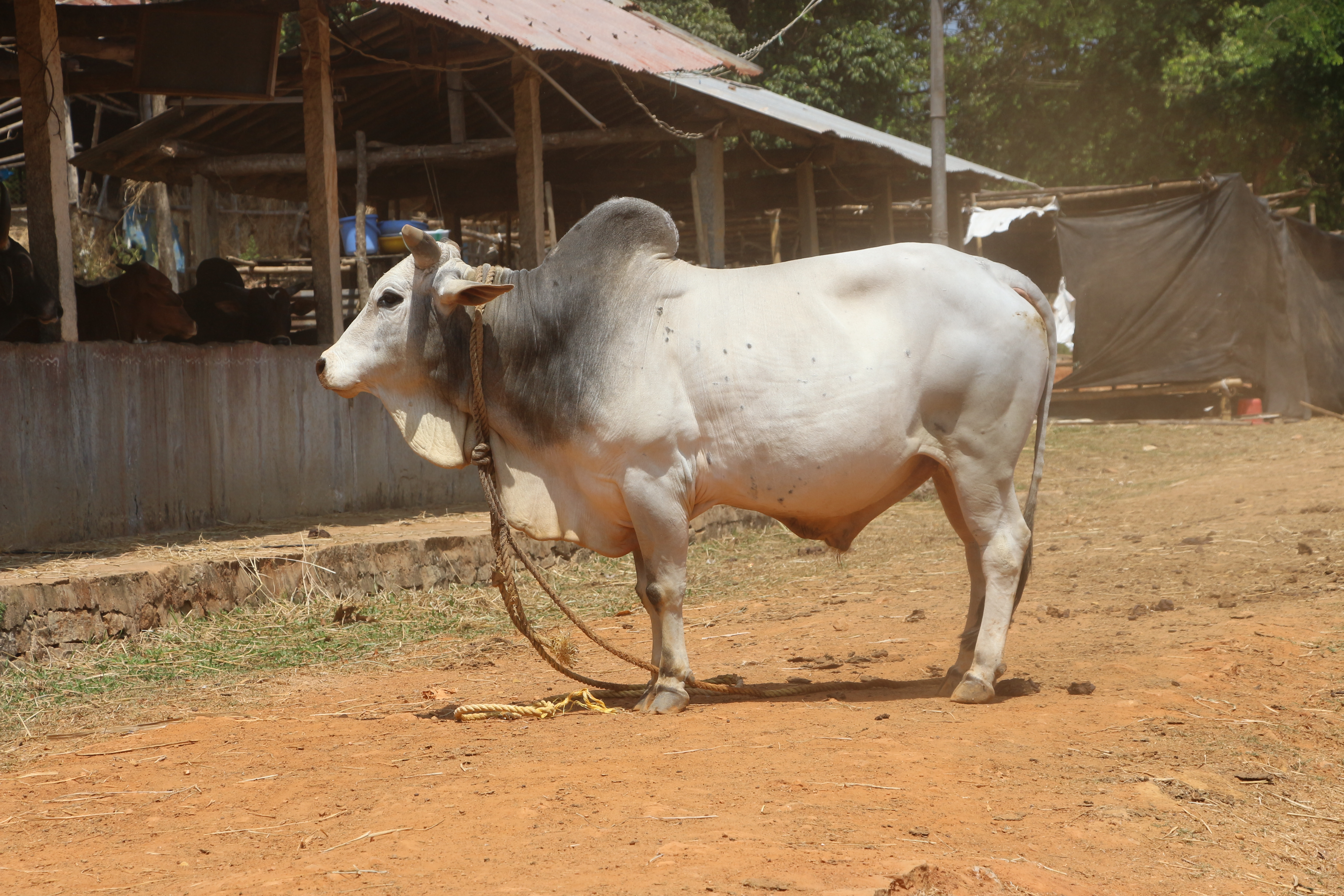
- Bull
- Conservation status: FAO (2007): not at risk
- Other names: Malavi; Manthani; Mahadeopuri
- Country of origin: India
- Distribution: Madhya Pradesh
- Use: draught

Traits
- Weight: Male: average: 499 kg; Female: average: 340 kg
- Height: Male: 140 cm; Female: 130 cm
- Coat: white/grey
- Horn status: lyre-shaped
- Cattle; Bos (primigenius) indicus

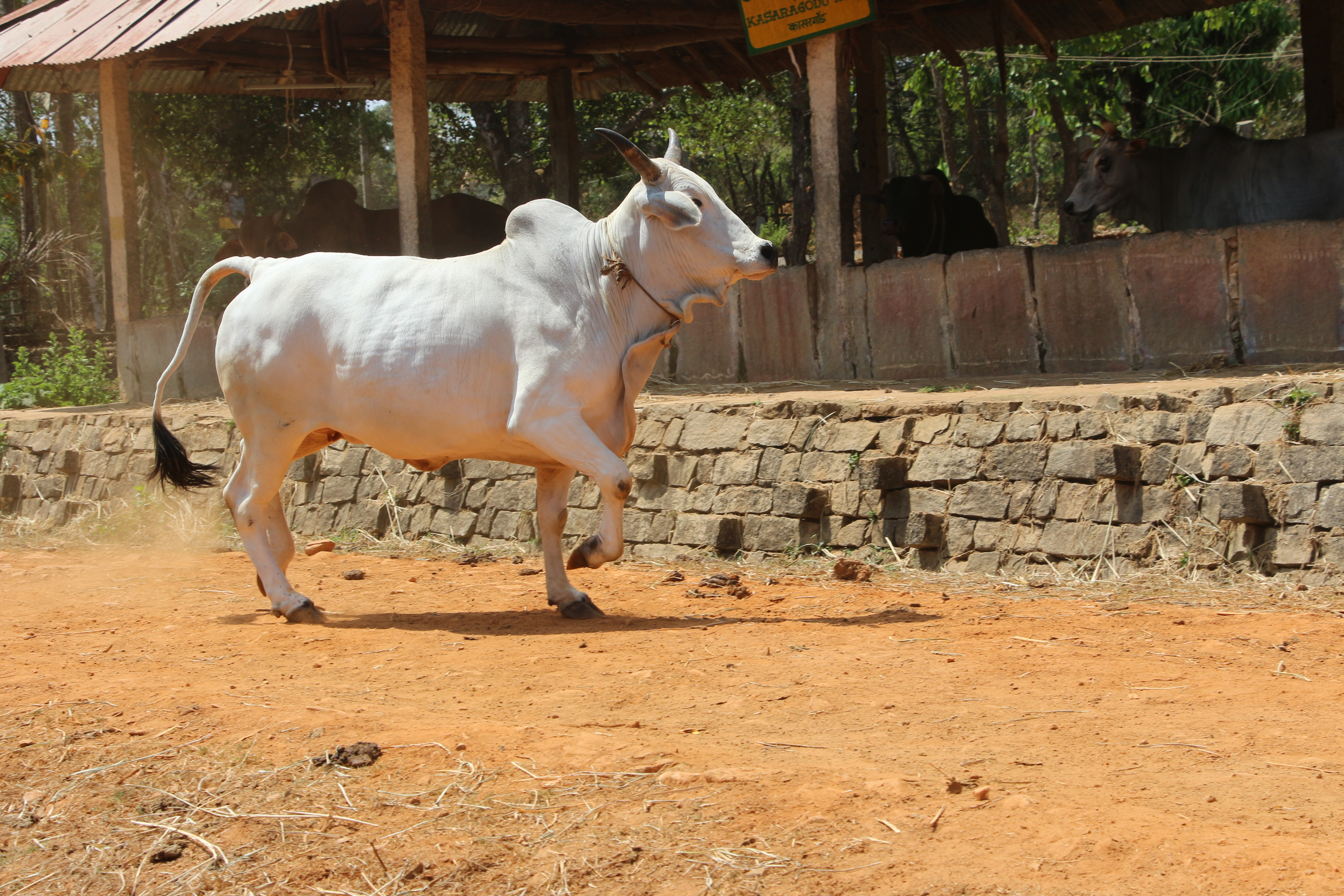
Malvi cow

The Malvi or Malavi, also known as Manthani or Mahadeopuri, is an Indian breed of zebu cattle from the Malwa plateau in western Madhya Pradesh, in central India. It is a good draught breed; the milk yield of the cows is low.

The breed has been studied at the Government Cattle Breeding Farm at Agar, in Shajapur district of Madhya Pradesh, for more than 50 years.
