= Bhangra (dance) =

Folk dance originating from the Punjab

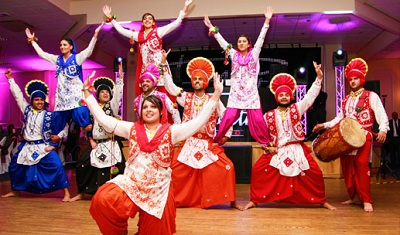
Bhangra dancers in Punjab, India

Bhangra is a type of traditional folk dance of Punjab area of the Indian subcontinent. According to Manuel (2001), bhangra is especially associated with the vernal Vaisakhi festival, performed during harvest season between April and the first quarter of May.

In a typical performance, several dancers execute vigorous kicks, leaps, and bends of the body—often with upraised, thrusting arm or shoulder movements—to the accompaniment of short songs called boliyan and, most significantly, to the beat of a dhol (double-headed drum). Struck with a heavy beater on one end and with a lighter stick on the other, the dhol imbues the music with a syncopated (accents on the weak beats), swinging rhythmic character that has generally remained the hallmark of bhangra music. An energetic Punjabi dance, bhangra originated with Punjabi farmers as a cultural and communal celebration. Its modern-day evolution has allowed bhangra to retain its traditional Punjabi roots, while broadening its reach to include integration into popular music and DJing, group-based competitions, and even exercise and dance programs in schools and studios.

== Origin ==
Bhangra has its origins from the historical Sialkot District which is considered to have its purest or standard version as well as neighboring districts of Gurdaspur, Gujranwala, Gujrat, and Shekhupura of the Majha. The community form of traditional bhangra has been maintained in Gurdaspur, where farmers performed bhangra to showcase a sense of accomplishment and to welcome the new harvesting season in pre-partition times, and has been maintained by people who have settled in Hoshiarpur, Punjab, India. Traditional bhangra is performed in a circle and is performed using traditional dance steps. Traditional bhangra is now also performed on occasions other than during the harvest season. According to Ganhar (1975), bhangra has been imported into Jammu which is danced on Baisakhi. Other Punjabi folk dances such as giddhā and luḍḍī have also been imported into Jammu, which shares Punjabi influences and an affinity with Punjab.

== Development ==
The 1950s saw the development of traditional bhangra in Punjab, which was patronized by the Maharaja of Patiala, who requested a staged performance of bhangra in 1953. The first significant developers of this style were a dance troupe led by brothers from the Deepak family of Sunam (Manohar, Avtar and Gurbachan) and dhol player Bhana Ram Sunami. Free form traditional bhangra developed during stage performances which incorporate traditional bhangra moves and also include sequences from other Punjabi dances, namely, Luddi, Jhummar, Dhamaal, and Gham Luddi. The singing of Punjabi folk songs, boliyan, are incorporated from Malwai Giddha. Bhangra competitions have been held in Punjab, India, for many decades, with Mohindra College in Patiala being involved in the 1950s.

== Perceptions ==
Though it has been referred to as a "Jat art," it may have had less specific origins, instead originally being a geographic West Punjabi regionalism. Men from Eastern Punjab originally viewed dancing as effeminate ; an activity limited to women's dance like the Giddha, or specialized male dancers (ਨਚਾਰ nachāră) who were not considered respectable.

After Partition, the dance was popularized by migrants from West Punjab through culture shows and college campuses, as attitudes began to change. As a result, the dance began to thrive in East Punjab, while being suppressed in Western Punjab. The more vigorous bhangra would come to supplant the older, historically more popular ਝੁੰਮਰ jhummară, though the eventual ubiquity of bhangra would trigger a revival of jhummar in recent years.

Bhangra connects to a much deeper set of masculine values. Most of these values are set through labour, industry and self-sufficiency in agriculture, loyalty, independence and bravery in personal, political and military endeavours; and the development and expression of virility, vigour, and honour are common themes. The use of a long staff, or khuṇḍā, by the men are reminiscent of martial dances like the bagha, from which bhangra's roots are traced.

Bhangra referred both to formal male performances and to communal dancing among men and women. In the past 30 years, bhangra has been established all over the world. It has become integrated into popular Asian culture after being mixed with hip hop, house and reggae styles of music. Certain bhangra moves have been adapted and changed over time but at its core remains a sense of cultural identity and tradition. Traditionally, bhangra is danced by men but now we see both men and women participating in this dance form. With bhangra competitions all over the world, we see all sorts of people competing in these events.

== Women in bhangra ==
Nowadays, while bhangra was "traditionally not for women at all," many second-generation diaspora Punjabi women have connected with their culture through bhangra, though at the expense of the traditional women's giddha, which has more of an emphasis on softer movements, acting, and storytelling. Bhangra is often adapted to suit women in this circumstance, in choices of moves, costumes, and props. This was concurrent with the rise in popularity of bhangra music abroad in the 1970s and 1980s, mixing with Western music genres. Women partaking in bhangra, seen as a powerful dance, is often motivated by modern notions of equality, often clashing with standards of authenticity and tradition. Like the men's jhummar, bhangra's over-commodification has also prompted efforts to revive other women's dances like the ਸੰਮੀ sammī.

Raaniyan Di Raunaq is India's first all-women's bhangra competition. Even with the abundance of female bhangra performers, many see this dance form as only masculine. Many women that compete in bhangra shows are judged according to a criterion that is made for male performers. Raaniyan Di Raunaq has customized a bhangra competition just for women or for those who identify as transgender or nonbinary. This competition has created a safe space where women can compete and be judged equally.

== Innovations and adaptations ==
In recent years, bhangra has also been performed in innovative styles, including a variant termed “Bhangra on Skates”, in which traditional bhangra steps are executed while skating. This form has been showcased in Chandigarh, India, through performances by freestyle skater Janvi Jindal..

== Gallery ==
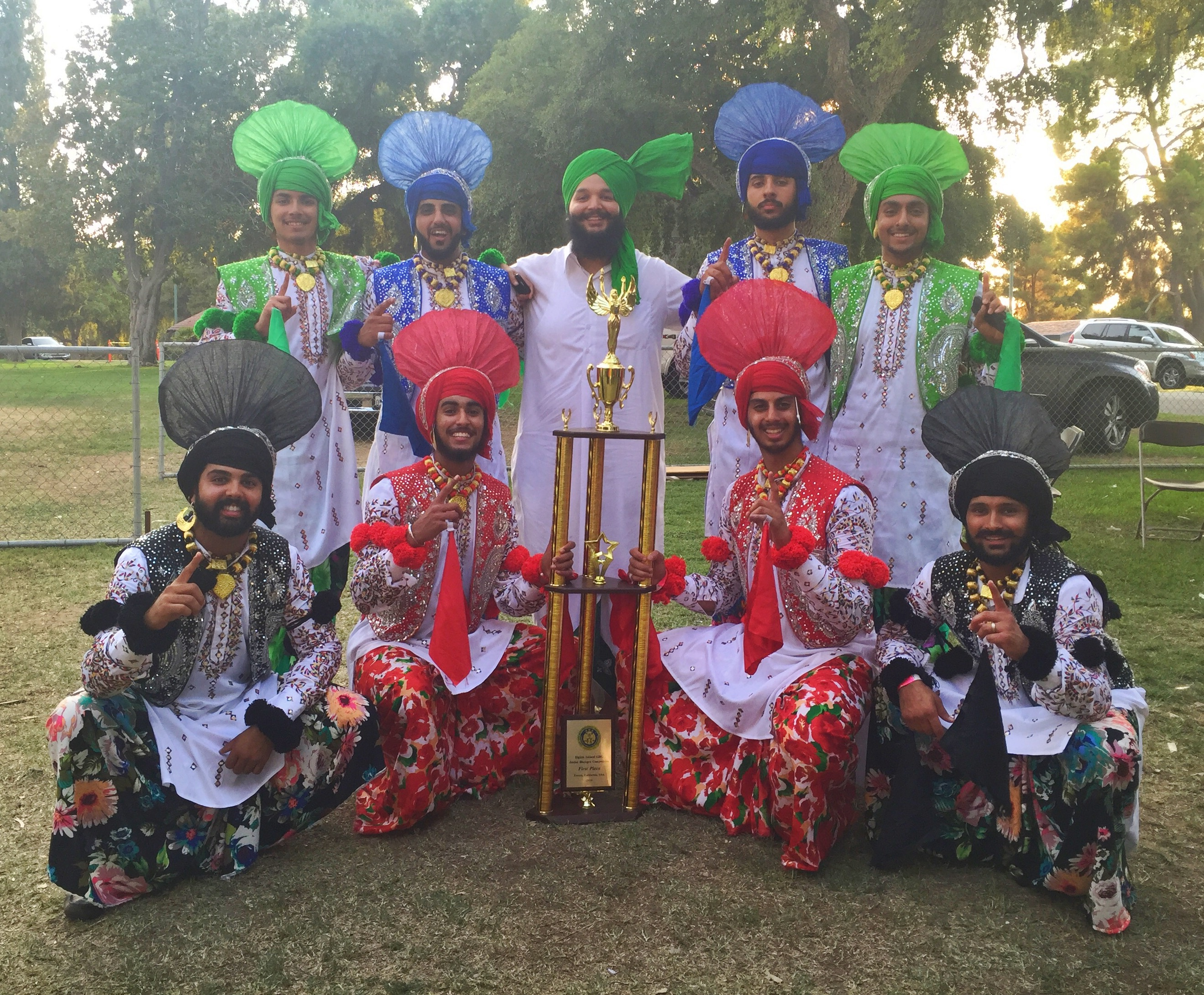
North American live bhangra team Johr Jawani Da

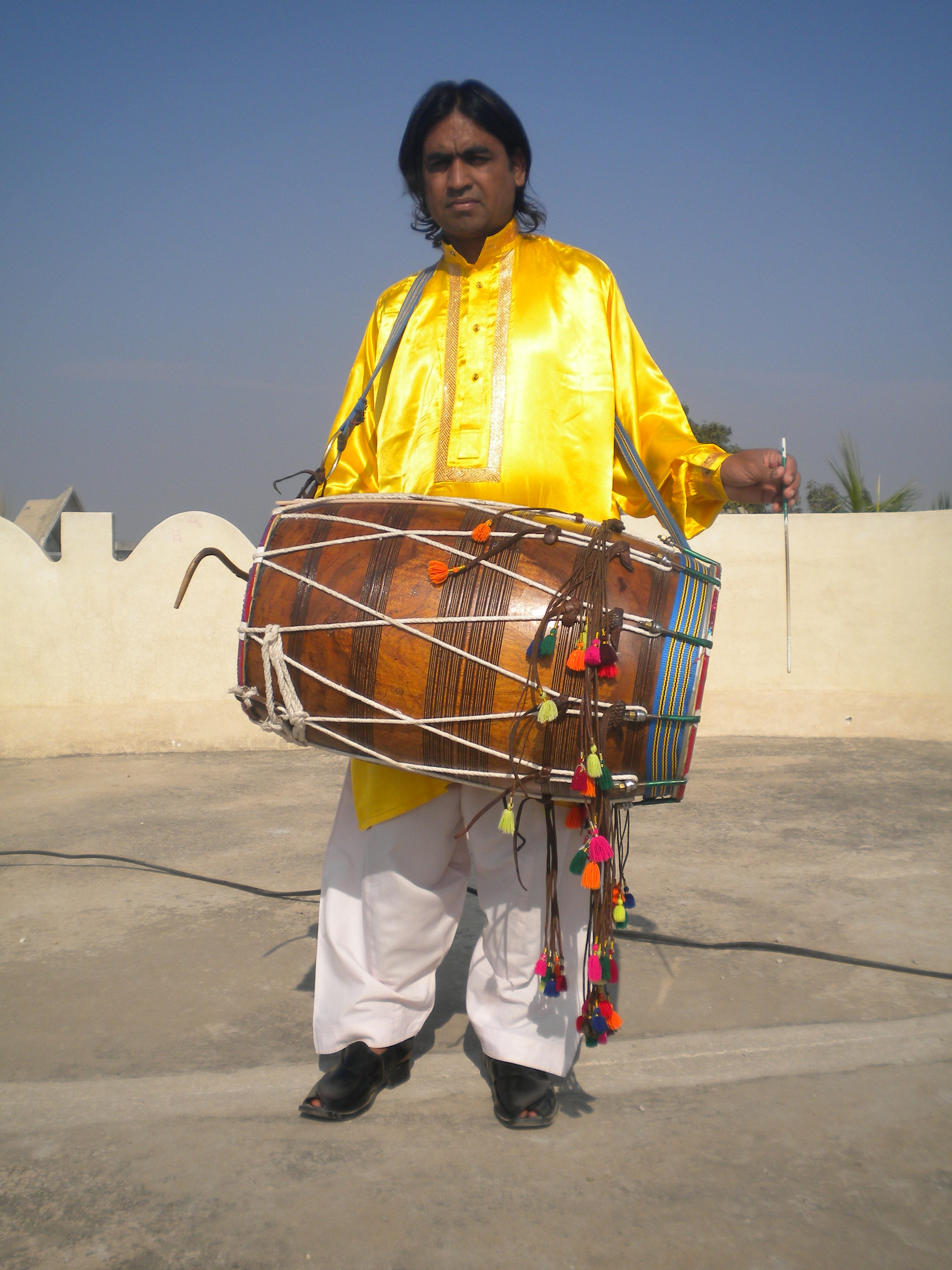
Punjabi bhangra drummer (Jhelum, Pakistan)

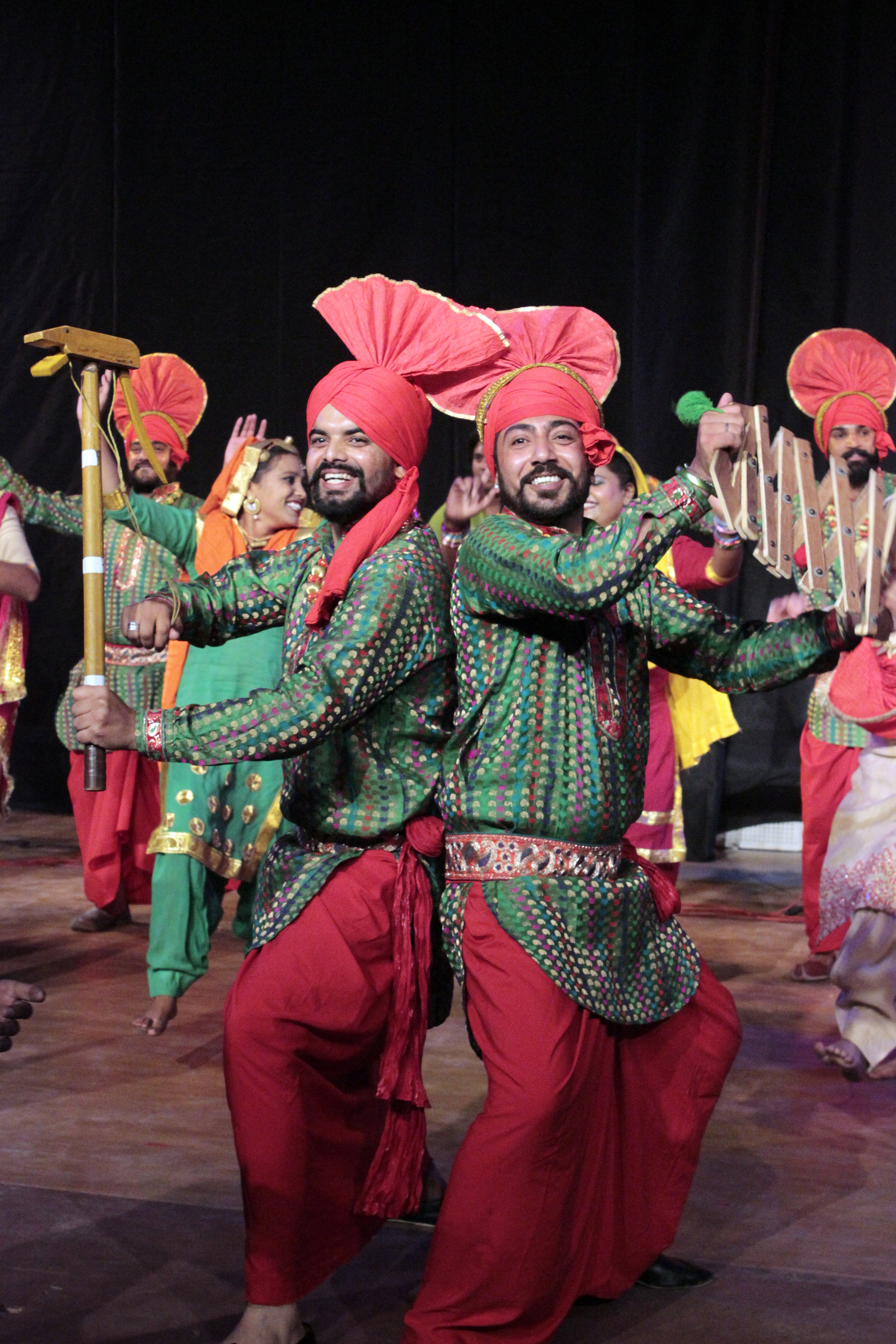
Bhangra

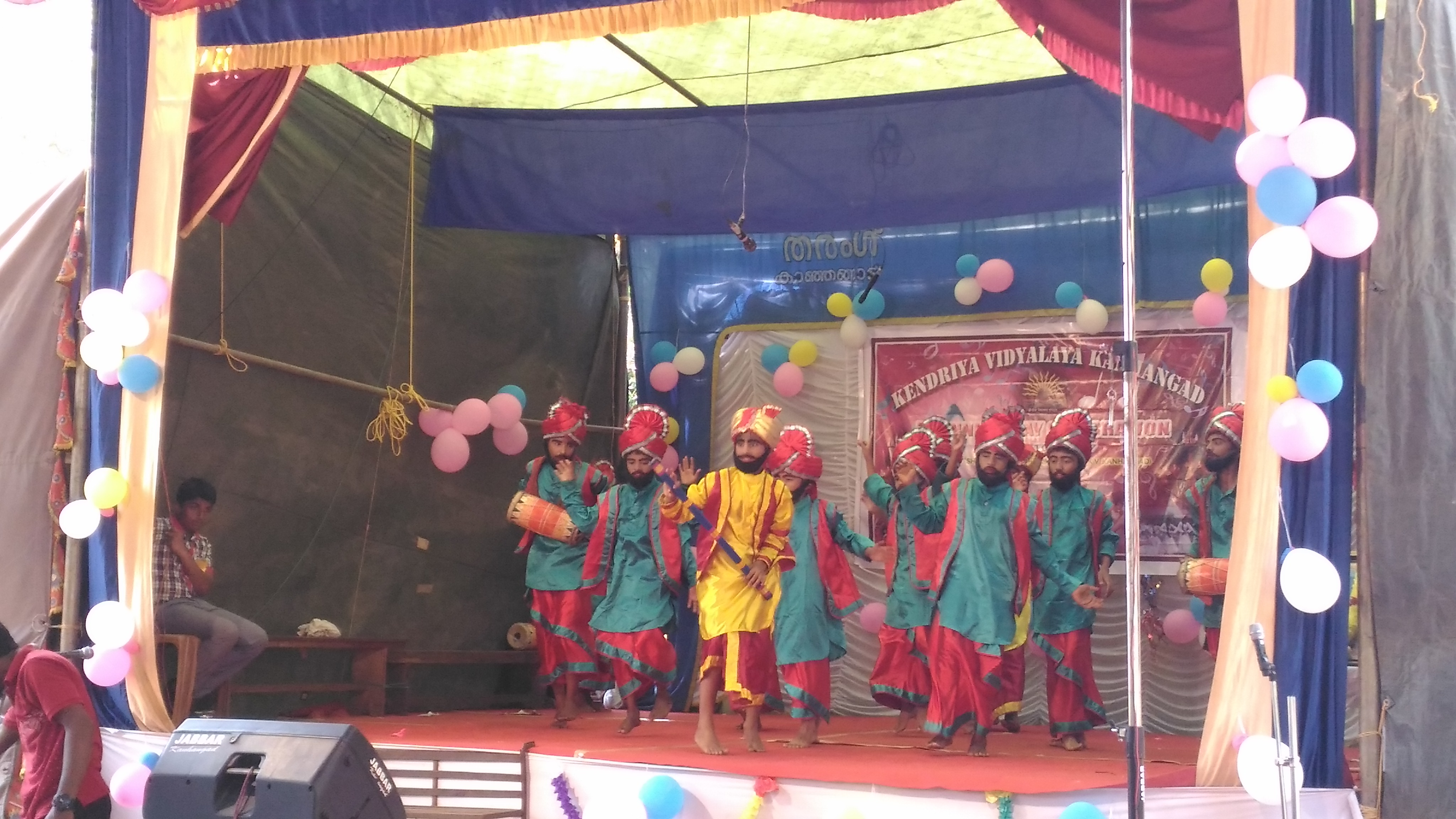
A group of students performing bhangra (dance) (India)

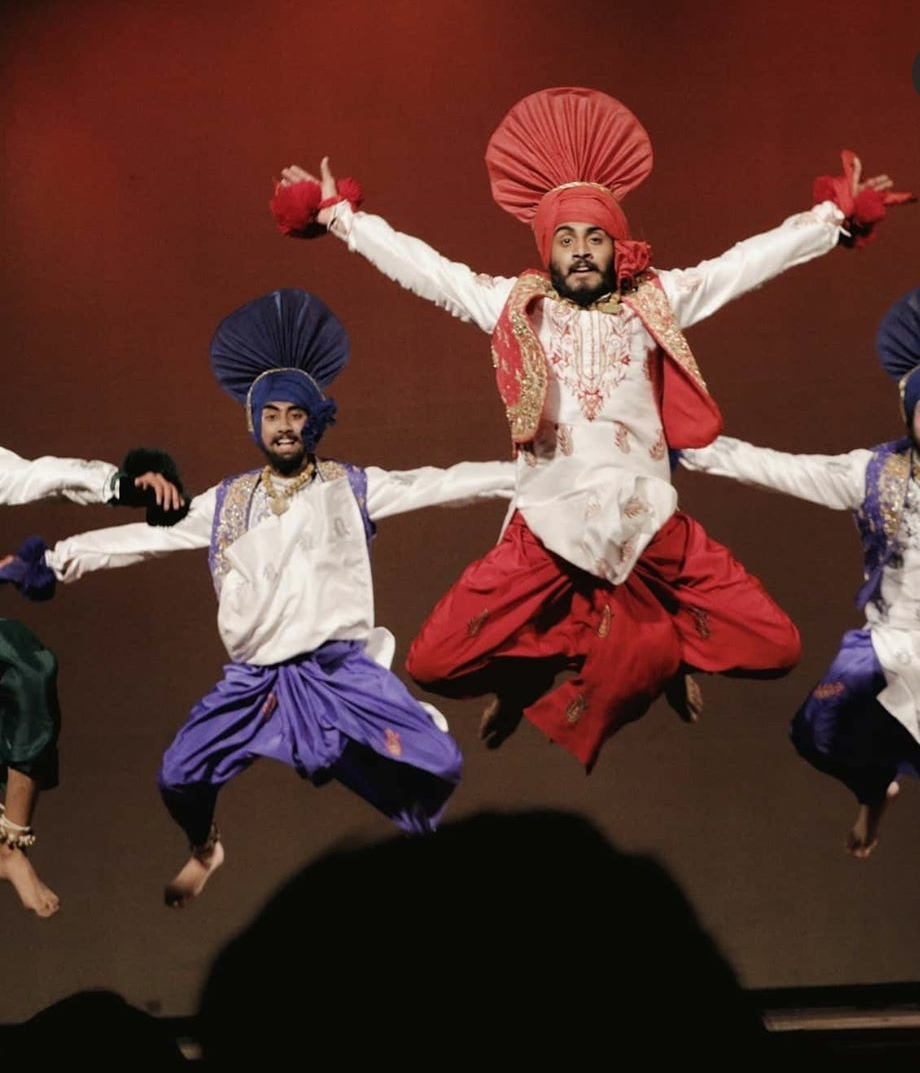
Bhangra dancers

== See also ==
- Bhangra Empire
- Dhol
- Punjabi folk dances
- Giddha
- Music of Punjab
