= Malwa (Punjab) =

Region of Punjab

Coordinates: 30.5000°N 76.0000°E

- Cultural region of Punjab
- Map
- Named for: Malavas

Malwa (IPA: [maːlʋaː]; Mālvā) is a geographical region in the south of Punjab state in India. It is located between south of the Sutlej river, north of the Ghaggar river, east of Pakistan, and west of the Sivalik Hills. Whilst Malwa officially consists of the Puadh region, this was historically and culturally a distinct region from Malwa. People from the region are known by the demonym 'Malwai' and the dialect of Punjabi spoken in the area is Malwai. The region is politically dominant in the State of Punjab.

== Etymology ==
The name of the region is derived from the Malavas, an ancient Indic tribe which inhabited the area in antiquity.

== History ==
=== Early history ===
Map created by the British East India Company of the Malwa region of Punjab showing the various polities, borders, and settlements of the area, ca.1829–1835. Rupnagar, Moga, Jagraon, Dharamkot, Kotkupura, Muktsar, and Sahnewal, are marked as the territories south of the Sutlej River which were controlled by the Sikh Empire.

The city of Ferozepur, located in the Malwa region, was founded sometime in the latter half of the 14th century by Firuz Shah Tughlaq the third of the Delhi Sultanate. Later-on during the Mughal Empire, Ferozepur acted as the capital of the Multan subah (province) according to the Ain-i-Akbari. With the shifting course of the Sutlej River, the region fell into decline, as the river which formerly provided a means of sustenance and fertility to the land became destructive and transformed the landscape of Malwa into mounds and deserts. Malwa had essentially taken on the appearance of a desert by the early 16th century due to these natural circumstances.

By the end of the 16th century, there was a migration of various Jat clans into the region for settlement, namely the Bhatti, Dhaliwal, Gill, and Sidhu clans, who entered the region from the south and southeast. The Sidhu clan of the Jats wielded power and influence in the local area. According to Pashaura Singh, the unpredictable power of the Sutlej River led to the toughening of the character of these newcomers.

=== Sikh gurus ===
The first Sikh guru to tour the Malwa region was Guru Hargobind, the sixth guru of the Sikhs. Prior to Hargobind, no Sikh guru had toured the region, which is in contrast to the neighbouring Majha and Doaba regions, which were introduced to Sikhism earlier on, as per Dalbir Singh Dhillon. Thus, most of the Jat tribes of Malwa were converted to Sikhism during the 17th century. With Guru Hargobind taking refuge in the forests of Daroli (present-day Daroli Bhai in Moga district) located in Malwa, many youths were drawn to the new religion and were martialized within this context. Guru Hargobind was physically impressive in stature and charismatic with his missionary efforts, which drew in converts in the region, providing new recruits for his Akal Sena. While at Daroli, Guru Hargobind kept in close communication with Bhai Gurdas and Baba Buddha. After the execution of Guru Arjan, the central Sikh headquarters at Amritsar came under close Mughal surveillance, which led to the development of Daroli in Malwa as an "itinerant Sikh centre" during the guruship of Guru Hargobind. Baba Gurditta, the son of Guru Hargobind and Mata Damodari, and father of Guru Tegh Bahadur, was born in the forests of Daroli in 1608.

Guru Hargobind visited the Jagraon region of Malwa in western Ludhiana and a Gurdwara called 'Guru Sar' was constructed in the village of Kaunke, located 7 km southwest of the city of Jagraon itself, to commemorate his visit to the locality between the years 1631–1632. During the early Mughal-Sikh wars, in 1634 Guru Hargobind left Amritsar to avoid Mughal persecution and arrived near Moga with fresh recruits enlisted en-route to stage a counter-attack against the Mughal government. When near Moga, he sent his family to safety in Kartarpur and whilst he remained in the Malwa region with his army.

At Dagru village in Moga district, it is believed Guru Har Rai stayed there for some time whilst on a tour of the Malwa region. Gurdwara Tambu Sahib was later constructed to commemorate his stay in the area.

The tenth guru of the Sikhs, Guru Gobind Singh, traveled around the Muktsar part of the Malwa region for around a year, converting many local Jats to Sikhism while doing so.

=== Sikh rule ===
Political control of the region was characterized by shifting local authority over dispersed settlements, being a hinterland. During Mughal rule, the region existed as a revenue-generation area administered through local intermediaries. Later, Sikh chiefs successfully carved out their own territories in the region. During the Sikh Confederacy of the 18th century, the Bhangi Misl held sway. Later, the region was part of the cis-Sutlej tract, which was mostly ruled by Phulkian states. As opposed to other regions of Punjab, most of Malwa was under the control of states under the protection of the British East India Company.

== Culture ==
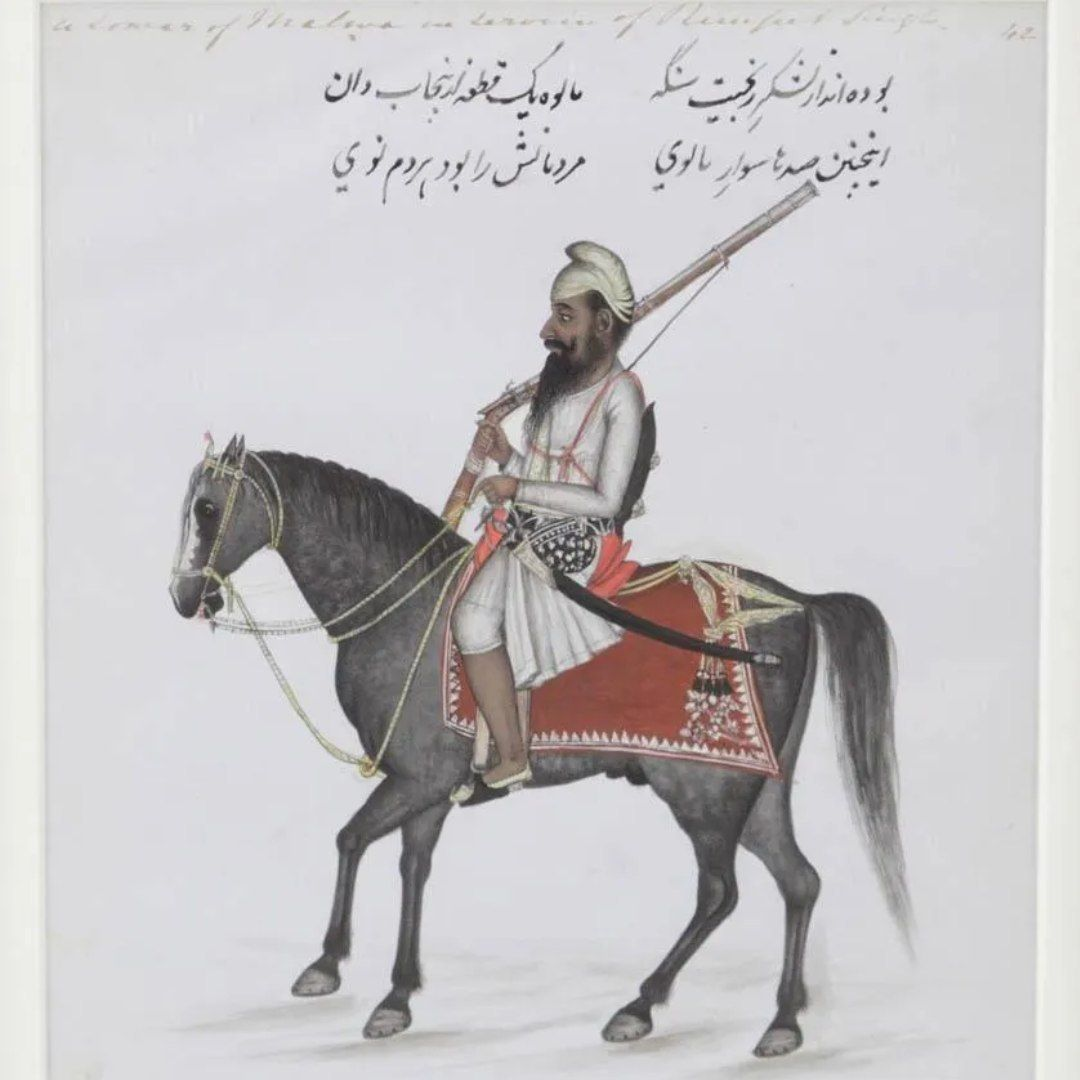
Equestrian painting of a Sikh from Malwa, Company School, Punjab Plains, ca.1840

The local Punjabi dialect of the cultural region is known as Malwai, which differs from other adjacent Punjabi lects. Malwai Giddha is a local dance form which evolved in the region. As per Mohinderpal Singh of Patiala, Malwa remains a stronghold of the Punjabi language in Indian Punjab, owing to the following factors:

Malwa area has produced more writers, language activists, films actors, singers, theatre groups than any other region. For example, Sidhu Moosewala, Sant Ram Udasi, Simranjeet Singh Maan and Lakha Sidhana. Sangrur and Patiala both are in Malwa, so that can be the reason. Panjabi University Patiala’s Theatre and Television Department provides Master degree, also there is Bhasha Vibhag in Panjabi University. All this keeps on encouraging youngsters to be associated with Panjabi language and Culture.

— Mohinder Pal Singh, Patiala

== Politics ==
The region is politically-dominant in the state of Punjab, with all of the state's chief ministers, apart from two, hailing from Malwa. (Note: Partap Singh Kairon was from Majha whilst Charanjit Singh Channi was from Puadh.) This has been attributed to Malwa becoming the largest region of Punjab after the re-organization of the state in 1966.

== Demographics ==
The Malwa region was historically sparsely populated in-comparison to the more occupied Majha and Doaba regions. The region is numerically dominated by the Jatt Sikh caste, whilst the Chamars and Tarkhans are also present in sizeable numbers.

== Geography ==
In Punjab, the region occupies the left bank of the Sutlej river or south of the Sutlej, extending until Ambala district in Haryana. Thus, it occupies much of the land between the Yamuna and Sutlej rivers. Around 60–70% of Indian Punjab's area belongs to this region.

=== Districts ===
The following districts are classified as Malwa (note that some of these districts' areas may overlap with the neighbouring Poadh region):

Malwa districts of Punjab, India
Barnala
Bathinda
Faridkot
Fatehgarh Sahib
Fazilka (not including Abohar tehsil)
Firozpur
Ludhiana
Malerkotla
Mansa
Moga
Mohali
Patiala
Muktsar
Rupnagar
Sangrur

Parts of these districts also speak Malwai Punjabi

- Kalawali Mandi area of Sirsa
- Area north of Ghaggar river Fatehabad

=== Traditional sub-regions ===
As per H. S. Bhatti, the Malwa region of Punjab can be traditionally subdivided into the following sub-regions:

- Jangal: derived from a historically vast tract of jungle known as the Lakhi Jungle, comprising the districts of Bathinda, Faridkot, Muktsar, and Firozpur districts.
- Puadh (Note: Others classify Puadh as being a separate, standalone region from Malwa, rather than a sub-region of it.): Ropar district and parts of Patiala district. The Puadhi dialect is spoken there.
- Bangar: region bordering Rajasthan and Haryana, comprising parts of Sangrur, Mansa, Bathinda districts near the border with those states. A dialect known as Bangru is spoken there.
- Tihara: comprises Ludhiana district and parts of Moga and Sangrur districts.

Marriages tend to be preferred within sub-regions, although the sub-region classification cannot be described as endogamous units.

== Relation to the Puadh region ==
Whilst the Puadh region is officially subsumed under Malwa due to a misguided belief of everything south of the Sutlej river in Punjab being "Malwa", it is culturally and historically a different region of Punjab, with its own culture and language. Puadh refers to the region of Punjab and Haryana adjacent to Chandigarh that are closer to the Ghaggar river.

== See also ==
- Doaba
- Majha
- Poadh
- Malwai Giddha
