= Kot Fatta =

- city
- :Location in Punjab, India Kot Fatta (India)
- Coordinates: 30.1122°N 75.112°E
- Country: India
- State: Punjab
- District: Bathinda

Population (2001)
  - Total: 6,493

Languages
  - Official: Punjabi
- Time zone: UTC+5:30 (IST)
- Postal code: 151101

Kot Fatta is a city and a municipal council in Bathinda district in the Indian state of Punjab.

The town is the second railway station on the Bathinda–Delhi railway line. It is located on the Bathinda-Mohali (SAS Nagar) State Highway (no. 12-A). It is 19 kilometers away from the main city and district of Bathinda. In the north is Bhucho Mandi, in south is Tawandi Sabo (Damdama Sahib) and in the east is Maur Mandi.

== Demographics ==
As of the 2001 India census, Kot Fatta has a population of 6493. Males constitute 53% of the population and females 47%. Kot Fatta has an average literacy rate of 51%, lower than the national average of 59.5%: male literacy is 58%, and female literacy is 44%. In Kot Fatta, 14% of the population is under 6 years of age.

== Overview ==
Kot Fatta is home to the Shaheed Sipahi Darshan Singh Government Senior Secondary School and three primary schools. It has a railway station, a police station, a small market bazaar (ਦਾਣਾ ਮੰਡੀ), a Health Dispensary and veterinary hospital. A municipal council office is located in the grain market. A bus stand with shops is located on Bathinda Mansa Road. The main Jat Sikh Community are Dhillons and it is an agricultural town. Wheat, paddy, cotton potatoes are the main crops of town. It has four Gurudwara sahibs. It has a post office near the high school.
