= Poohla =

Village in Punjab, India

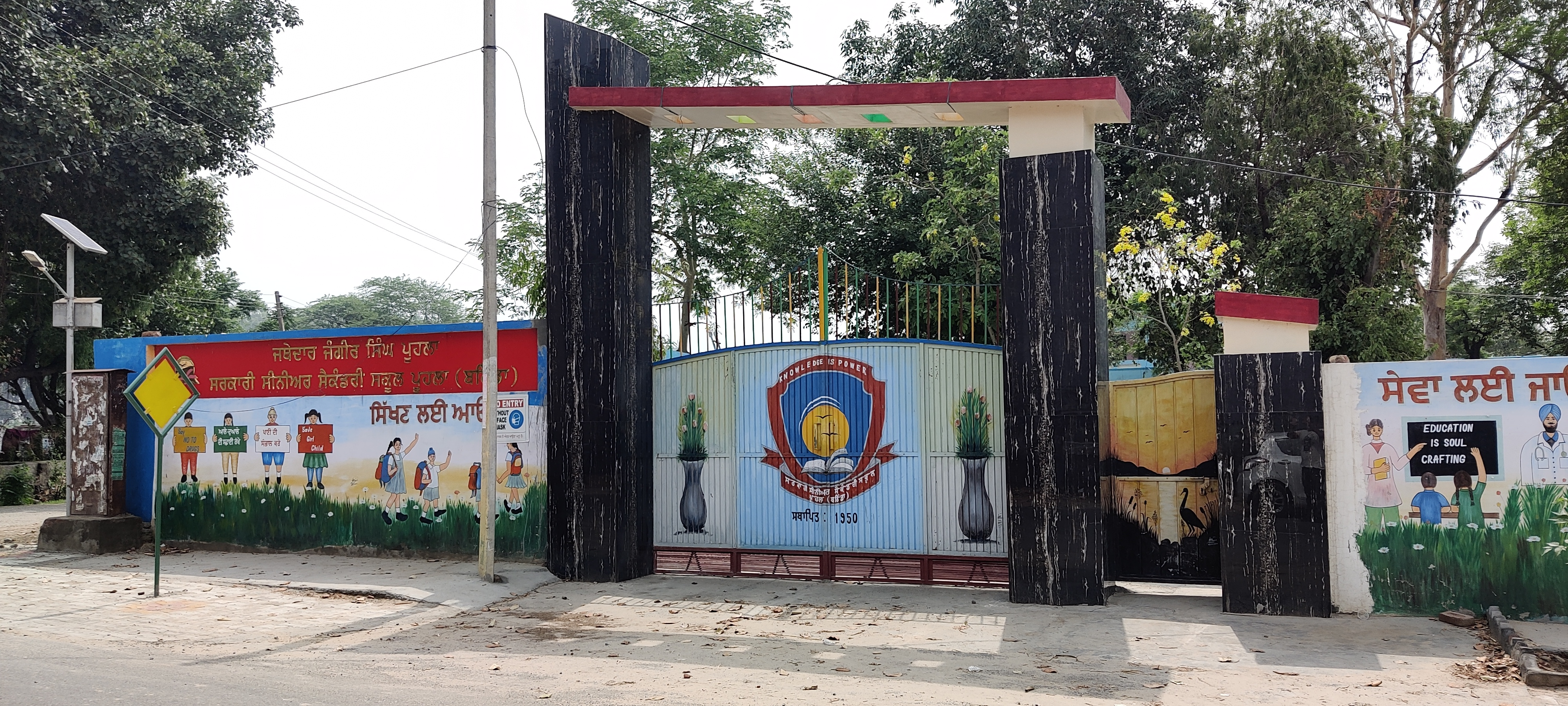
Entrance of government senior secondary school Poohla (Bathinda)

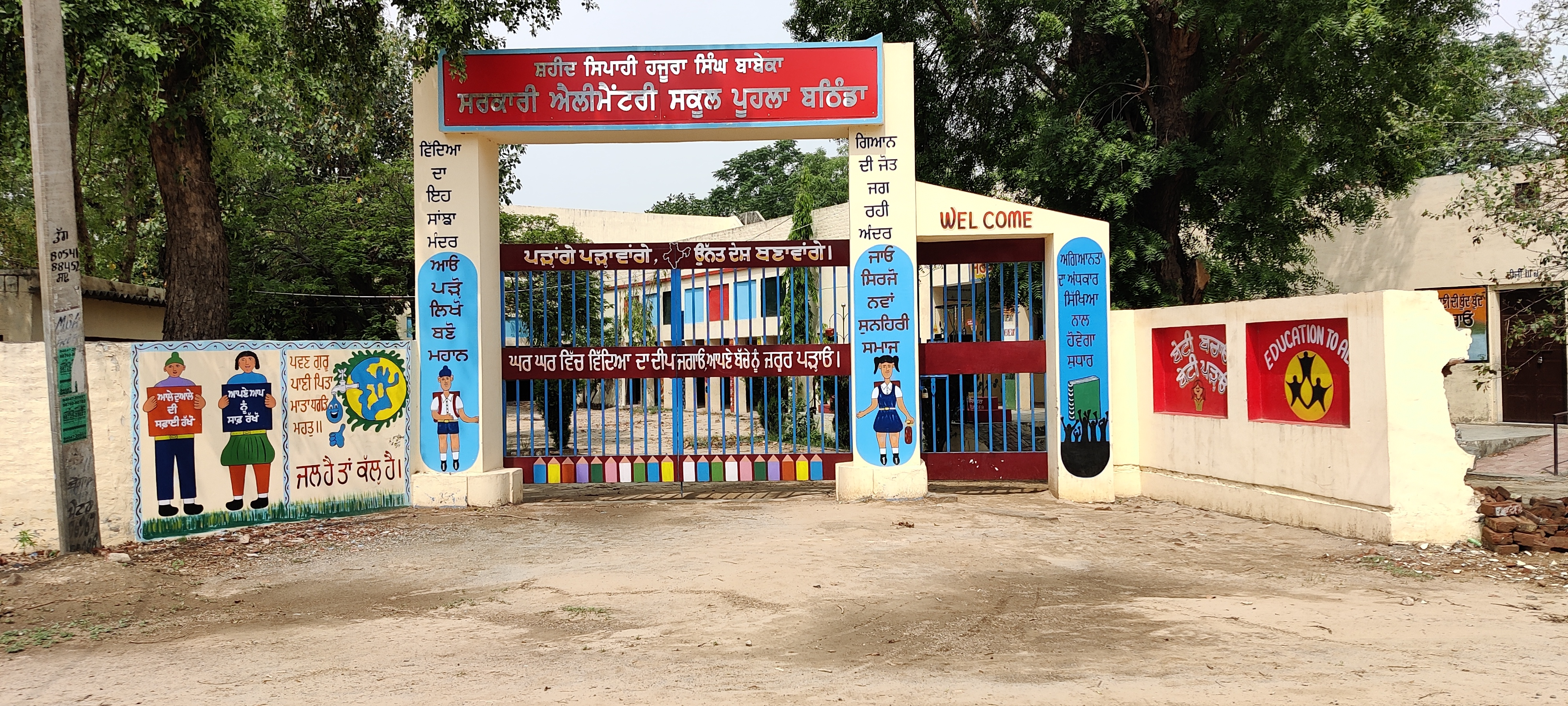
Entrance of Govt. Elementary School Poohla (Bathinda)

Poohla is a village located in Bathinda district in Punjab, India. It is frequently confused with Poohla village in Amritsar, home to a notorious Sikh Nihang.

It is a small village located on Bhucho-to-Bhagta Bhai ka Road. It is situated on the Sirhand Canal. At the last census, it had a population of 5,785, in 1,132 households. The main profession is agriculture. Moreover, it is also famous for its honesty. It is 2249 hectares in area.

There is a government high school and a primary school. For health care, a dispensary is there in village center.

On the northeast side of Sirhand Canal, which flows from east to west, an old guest house was constructed during British times to accommodate English officers. Later it was used by Indian government officers. Today it is in dilapidated condition.

Most of the community is Sikh and there are three main Gurdwaras and one Dera BaBa Dayanand Ji. There is another Gurudwara of the Ravidassia community. Many families permanently migrated to Canada, and live in Toronto, Vancouver, and other cities.

The nearest hospital is three kilometers away, but a tertiary care hospital, the Adesh Institute of Medical Sciences & Research, is situated on Bathinda-Barnala Road. Bathinda is a main city almost 30 km away from the village.

Kabadi cup is organised with help of Balkar Singh Sidhu to promote healthy lifestyle and sportsmanship. Recently, the Punjab government built a small Hydroelectric power plant on Sirhand Canal to overcome power shortages in the region. On canal bridge, there are two banyan trees on either side of road. During the summer, you can see a lot of people enjoying the cooler shade of these trees and drinking sweet water from water hand pumps next to them. Many people come and take water from these pumps, as it is very pure and good for drinking. When you cross the Sirhand Canal bridge, on the left side is the Vishvakarman temple built by the Ramgarhia community of the village and neighboring villages. Every year after Diwali festiwal, Vishwakarma day is celebrated and almost everyone participates. Eminent wrestler:S Bachan Singh 'Pehalwan' died in 1989.
