= Maur Charat Singh =

Maur Charat Singh (Chadat Singh Maur) is a village 2 km from Maur Mandi town, in Bathinda district in Punjab state of India. It is a small village with one Gurdwara.
