= Balkar Sidhu =

Indian politician

MLA, Punjab
- Incumbent
- Assumed office 2022
- Preceded by: Gurpreet Singh Kangar
- Constituency: Rampura Phul
- Majority: Aam Aadmi Party

Personal details
- Party: Aam Aadmi Party
- Known for: Punjabi singer and politician
- Musical career
- Born: Balkar; 10 October 1971 (age 55); Poohla, Punjab, India
- Genres: Punjabi folk, bhangra, pop
- Occupations: Singer, actor, Politician

Balkar Singh Sidhu (born 10 October 1971) is an Indian politician and Punjabi singer. He is the Member of legislative assembly from the Rampura Phul Assembly constituency and a member of the Aam Aadmi Party.

== Early life and career ==
Balkar Sidhu was born on 10 October 1971, to father S. Roop Singh Sidhu and mother Charanjeet Kaur, in the village of Poohla of Bathinda district in Punjab. He is married to Jinder Kaur and has two daughters and one son. He is the three-times university gold medalist in singing and learned music from the famous Dhadi singer Gurbakhsh Singh Albela (his uncle) as professional.

== Politics ==
In May 2014, he joined Aam Aadmi Party. He was nominated AAP candidate from Talwandi Sabo Assembly constituency in 2014 Punjab by-elections. Later he was replaced by another candidate Baljinder Kaur. Sidhu decided to contest elections as independent candidate and was expelled from AAP, although he re-joined The Aam Aadmi Party.

In 2022 Punjab Assembly elections, Balkar Singh Sidhu won from the Rampura Phul Assembly constituency defeating Shiromani Akali Dal candidate Sikandar Singh Maluka and former Congress MLA Gurpreet Singh Kangar. The Aam Aadmi Party gained a strong 79% majority in the sixteenth Punjab Legislative Assembly by winning 92 out of 117 seats in the 2022 Punjab Legislative Assembly election. MP Bhagwant Mann was sworn in as Chief Minister on 16 March 2022.

== Member of Legislative Assembly ==
He represents the Rampura Phul Assembly constituency as MLA in Punjab Assembly.

Committee assignments of Punjab Legislative Assembly

- Member (2022–23) Committee on Estimates
- Member (2022–23) Committee on Government Assurances

== Discography ==
His first Punjabi music album was Karna Chhad De Pyar, released during his graduation's first year. Later he released Din Pepran De and other albums. He has a role in the Punjabi film, Desi Munde, which as of February 2012 is incomplete.

His latest single track release was "Jatt Pateya Gya" composed and directed by Studio Nasha. Some of his albums are:

- Din Pepran/Paperan de
- Hasdian De Ghar Vasde
- Gall Taan Bandee
- Aaja Ganne Chupiye
- Tu Meri Khand Mishri
- Do Gallan
- Charkhe
- Laung Taviteriaan
- Mehndi
- Phulkari
- Chubare Wali Baari
- Saada Vee Viyah Ho Gayan

== Electoral performance ==
Punjab Assembly election, 2022: Rampura Phul
Party	Candidate	Votes	%	±%
AAP	Balkar Singh Sidhu	56,155	41.50	▲17.49
SAD	Sikander Singh Maluka	45,745	33.80	▲0.84
INC	Gurpreet Singh Kangar	28,185	20.80	▼19.79
SAD(A)	Baljinder Singh	2,541	1.90	New entry
PLC	Amarjit Singh Sharma	1,041	0.80	New entry
NOTA	None of the above	720	0.40	
Majority		10,410	7.65	
Turnout		136,089	79.7	
Registered electors				
AAP gain from INC				

State Legislative Assembly
Preceded by -	Member of the Punjab Legislative Assembly from Rampura Phul Assembly constituency 2022 –	Incumbent
