= Forts in India =

Forts in India have been constructed and used since at least the Bronze Age. While they are all called forts, most of them are larger and resemble castles. The existence of forts in ancient India is substantiated by documentation and excavation, as most of the structures have been lost, but it is known that they were classified into six categories, based on their defensive structures. In medieval times, the architecture of the forts had both Hindu and Muslim influence. Their structure moved towards having multiple walls, strong gates, deep defensive zones, and they began to enclose multiple structures, such as palaces and temples. Early modern forts were strengthened and adapted to resist gunpowder cannons, and the cities protected by the forts grew from small townships to presidencies. The forts constructed by the British initially had simple designs, and they adapted many existing forts into military barracks and training academies. Very few forts and castles have survived unchanged since the early Middle Ages or even since the early modern period: most of those built in the 10th-15th centuries were later rebuilt and altered. The existing forts are continually modified and many of them are privately owned.

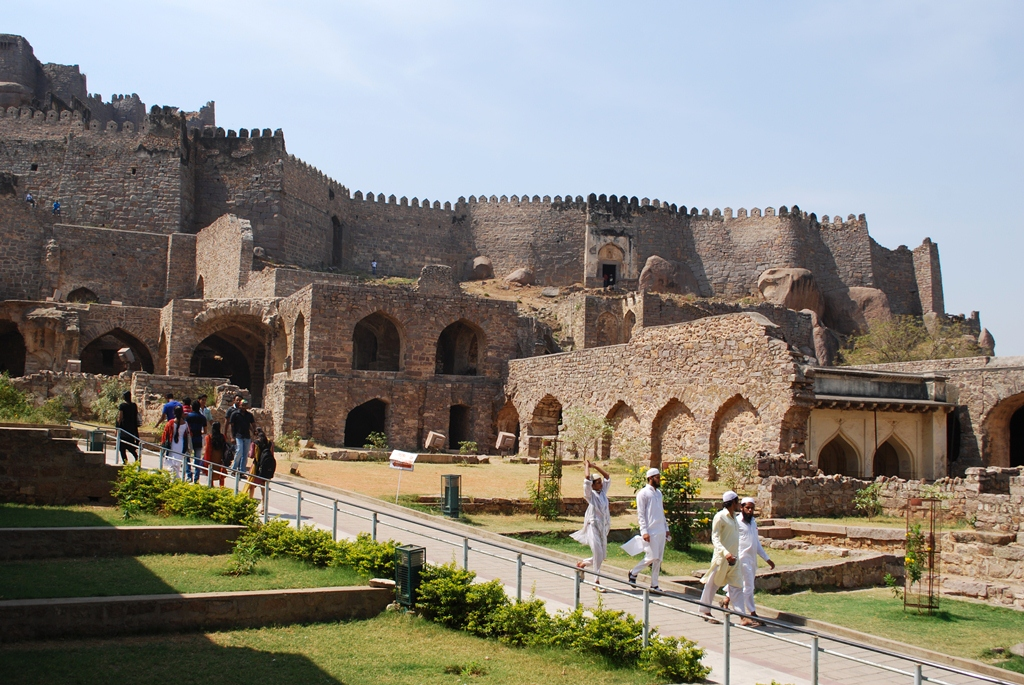
Golconda Fort, Hyderabad

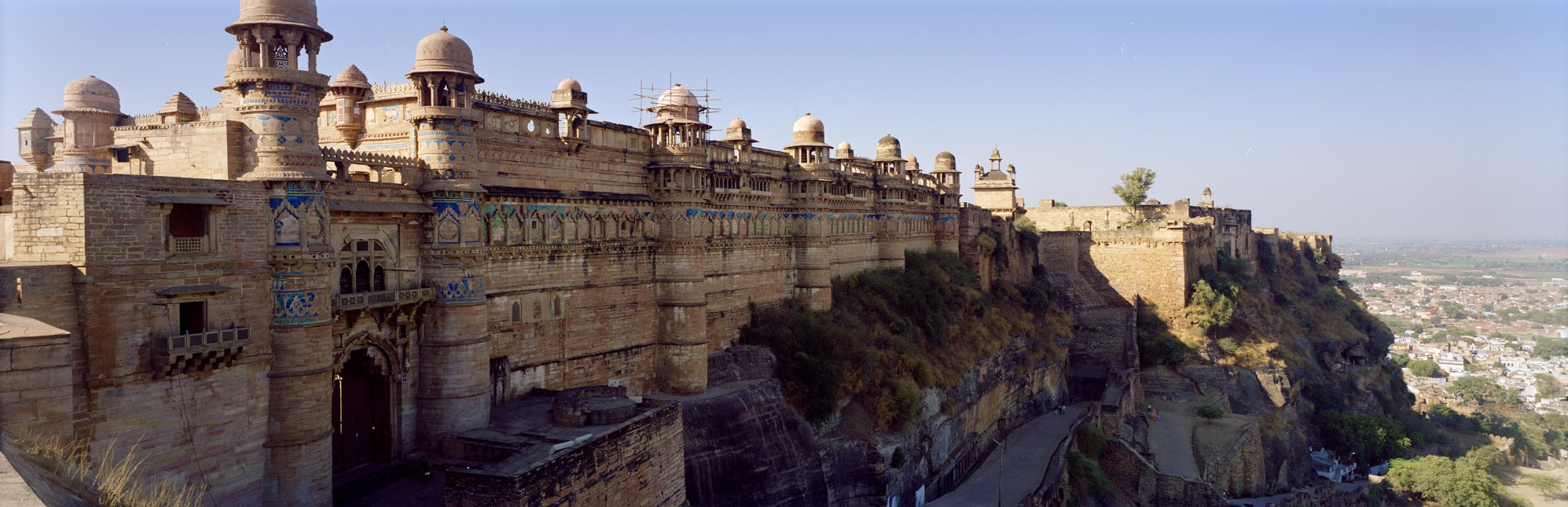
Gwalior Fort, Gwalior

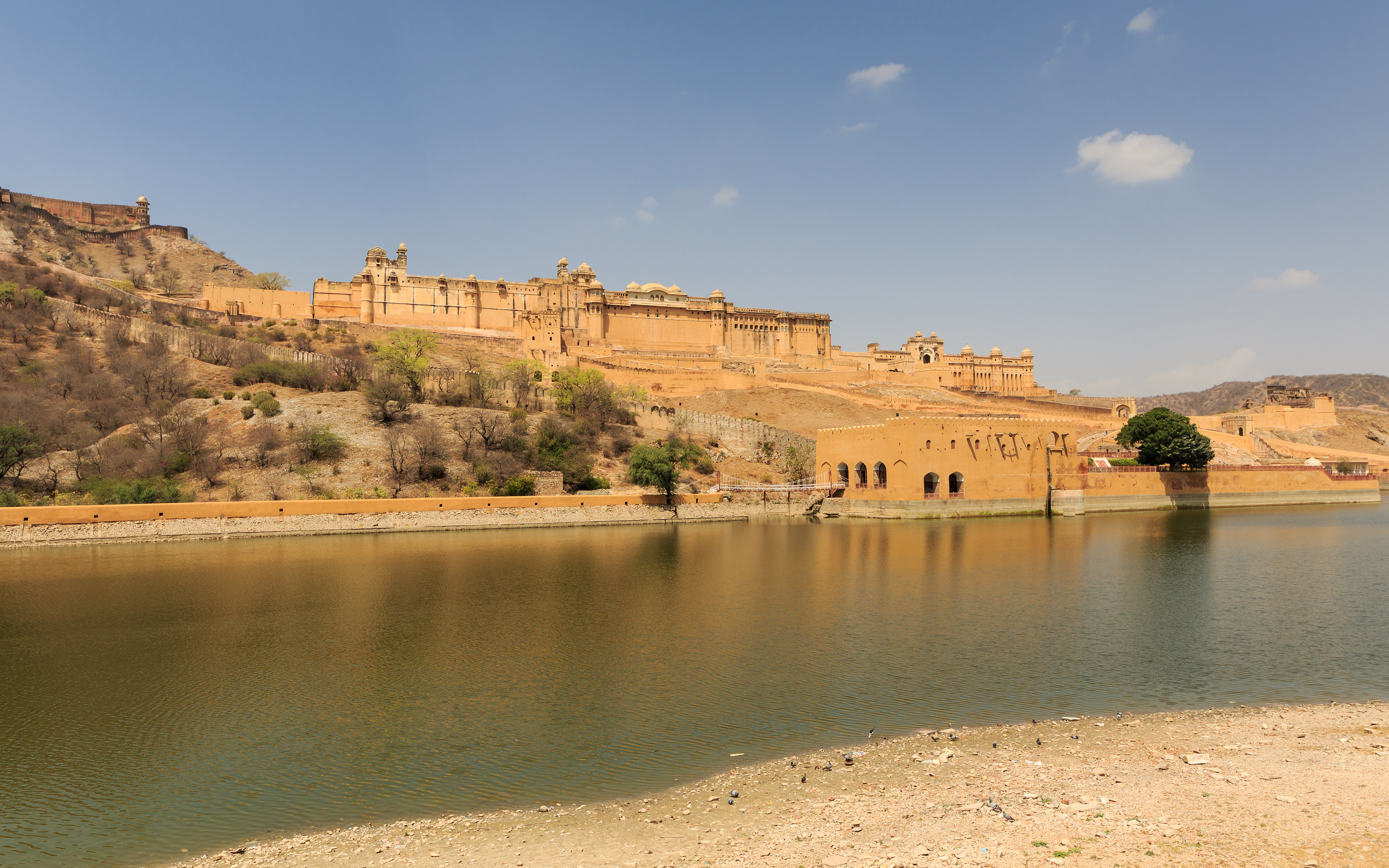
Jaipur Fort, Rajasthan

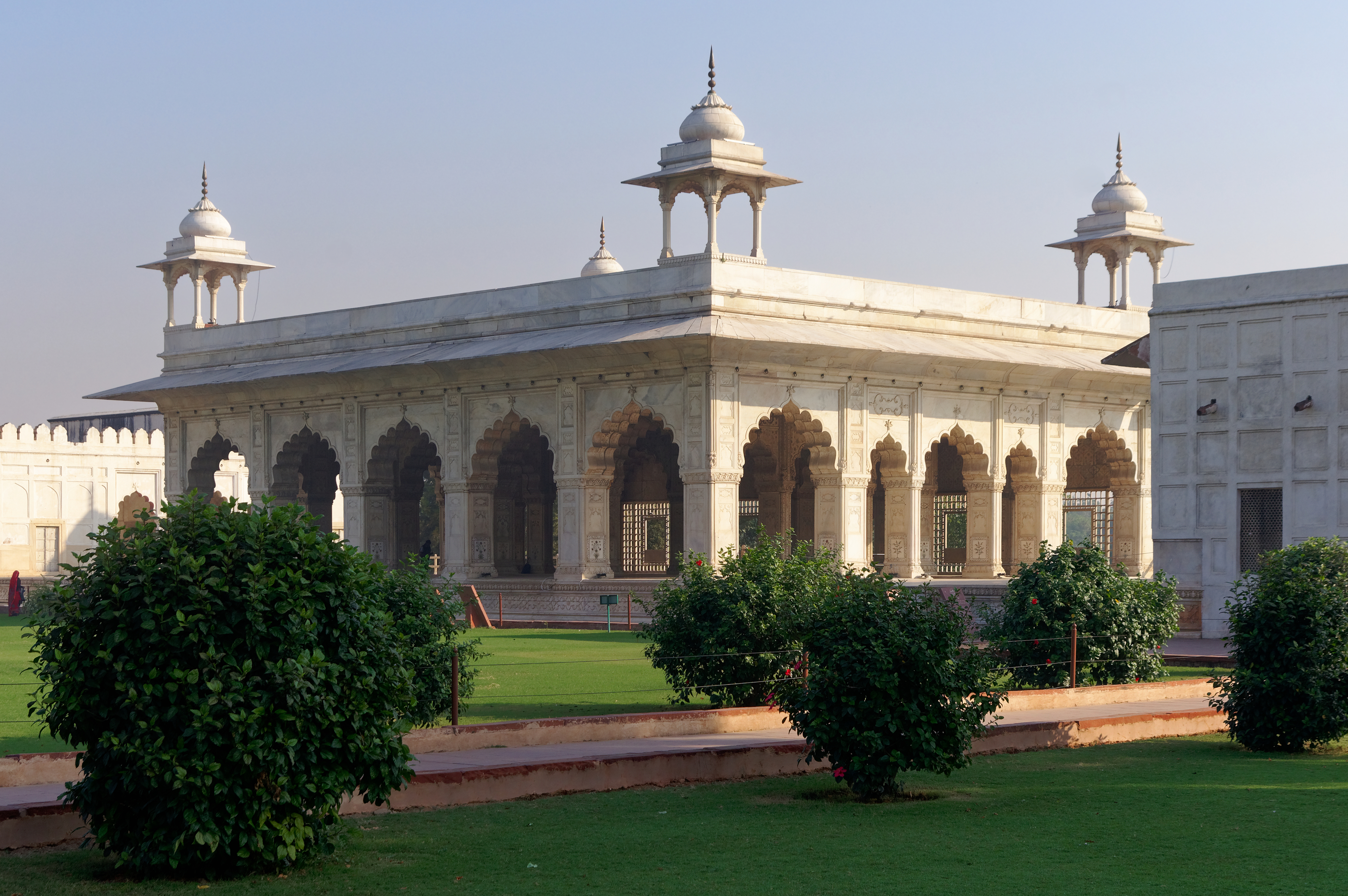
Diwan i Khas in Red Fort, Delhi

== Etymology ==
Most of the forts in India are actually castles or fortresses but, when the British Government in India were cataloging them in the 17th–19th century, they used the word "forts" as it was common in Britain then. All fortifications, whether European or Indian, were termed forts. Thereafter, this became the common usage in India. In local languages, the fort names are suffixed by local word for fort; thus, usage of the Sanskrit word durga (as in Suvarnadurg), the Urdu word qila (such as Aligarh Qila), or the Hindi words garh (as in Mehrangarh) or gad (as in Sudhagad) is common.

== History ==
=== Forts in ancient India (1500 BCE to 500 CE) ===
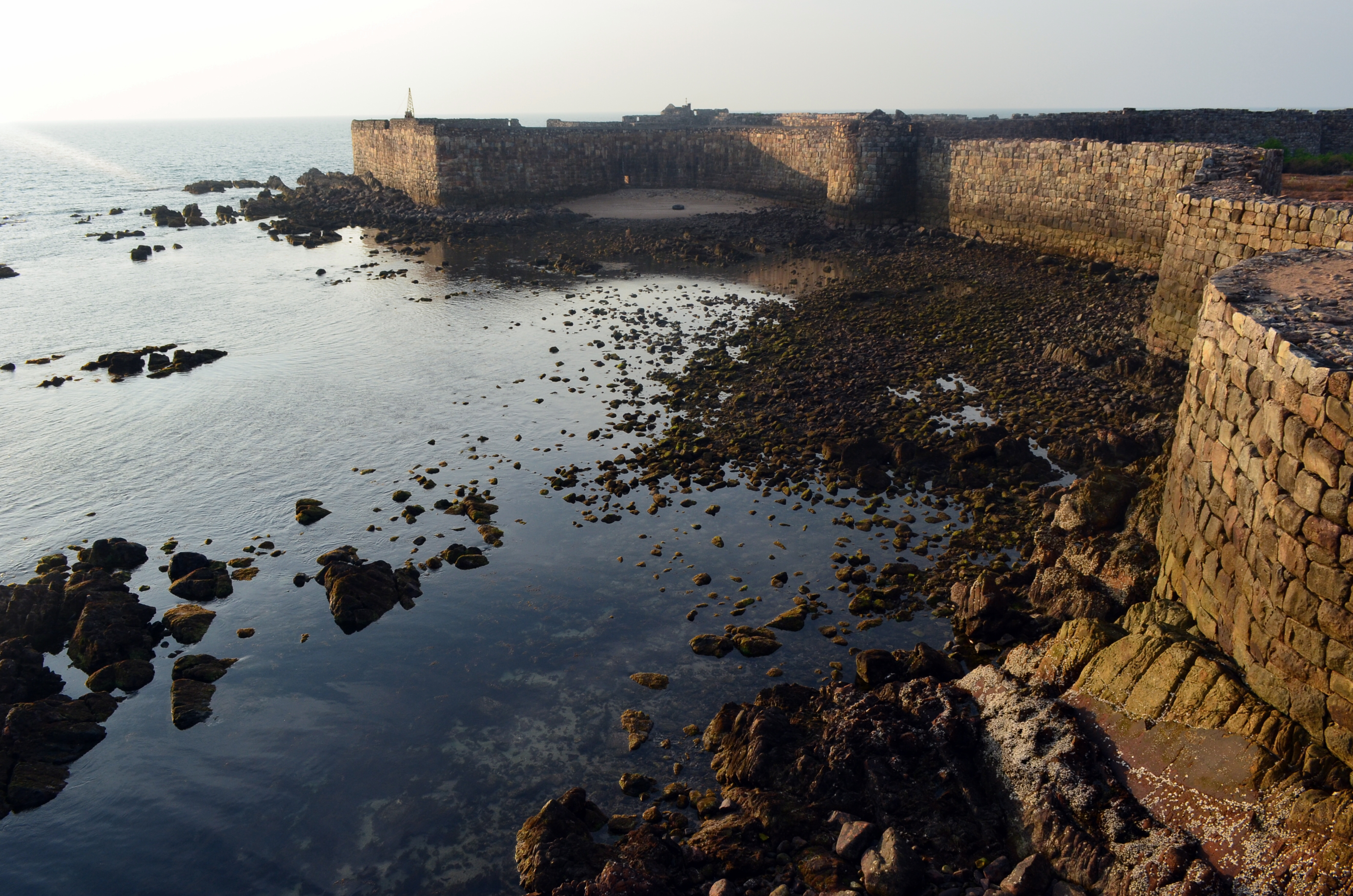
Sindhudurg Fort, Maharashtra

In ancient India, three major methods were used for the construction of Indian forts. The first consisted of earthen ramparts. Often, they were constructed of the sand which was dug out of the ditch surrounding the fort. The second was made of rubble, with earth on the outside, since it was more sturdy. The third type of construction was stone and masonry work, which was the strongest. Often, materials from demolished forts were reused in the building of new forts.

By the 4th century BCE, fortified cities were common in India. The largest ones were between the city of Mathura (on the Yamuna river) and Magadha (on the Ganges). Another series of forts in the south went from Ujjain (on the Narmada) into the Deccan. The existence of these forts has been inferred from the remains of fort walls and bastions found in excavations at Rajagriha and several sites in the Gangetic plain, notably Kaushambi. At the latter site, huge walls of burnt brick, which look like they have been battered, have been discovered.

There are few descriptions of these ancient structures. The most descriptive comes from Megasthenes, an ambassador of Seleucus I Nicator to the court of Chandragupta Maurya. He describes Pataliputra as being guarded by a ditch with wooden walls, and says that the fort had 570 towers and 64 gates, with colonnaded halls decorated with gold and silver. One such hall has been excavated, and is one of the oldest stone structures in India.

==== Ancient Indian classification of forts ====
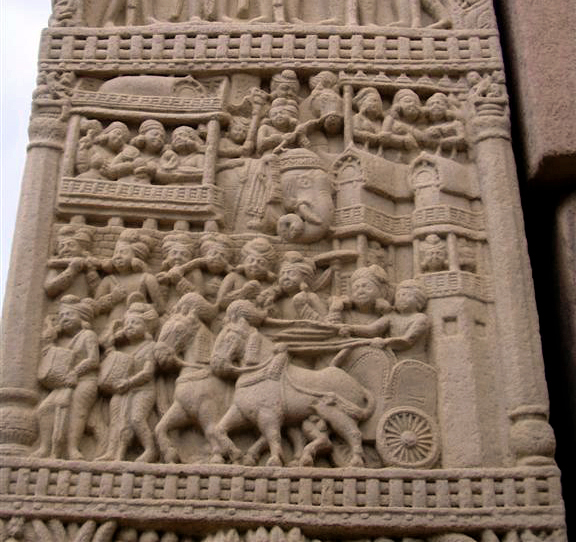
Detail on stupa at Sanchi showing evidence of crenellations and embrasures

Though most of the structures have decayed and are lost, India's legacy of ancient forts remains in shastras (ancient Indian treatises) and in reliefs on stupas. On some early reliefs, carvings indicate that ancient Indian forts had crenellations, embrasures, and sloping walls.

The Arthashastra, the Indian treatise on military strategy, describes six major types of forts, differentiated by their major modes of defenses:

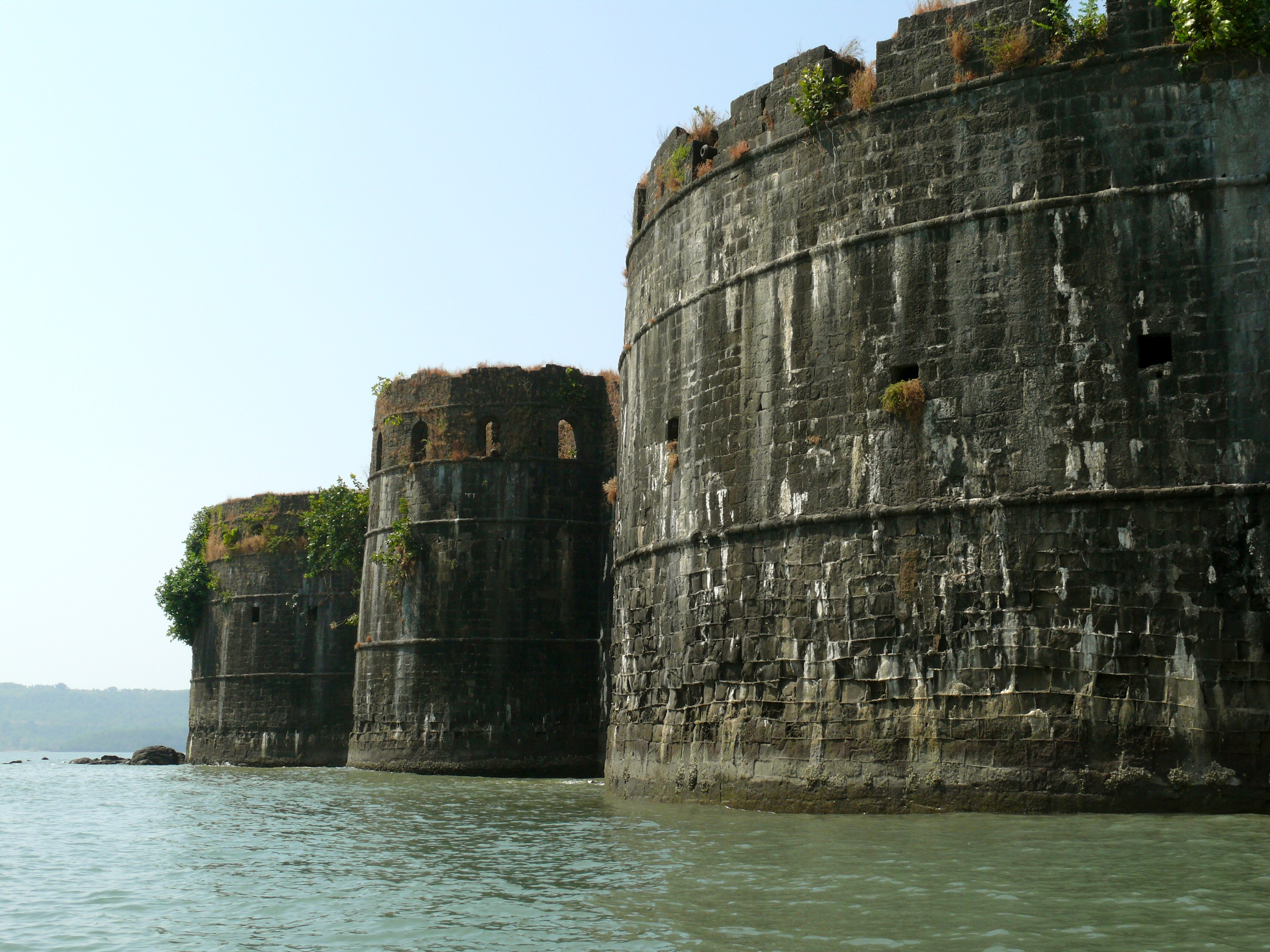
Bastions of Murud-Janjira a Jala durga

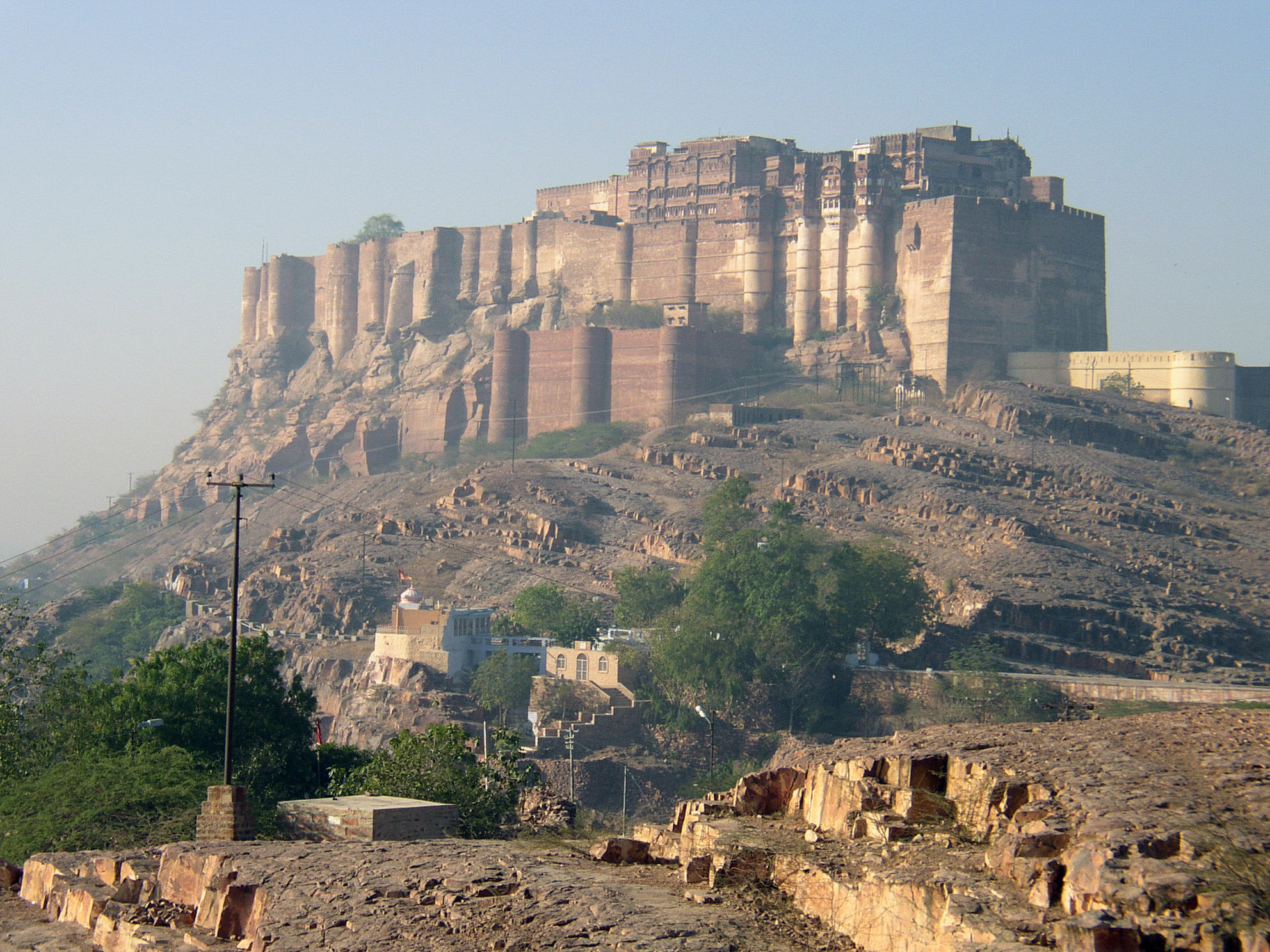
Mehrangarh Fort, Jodhpur, a Giri durga

- Jala-durga (Water fort):
  - Antardvipa-durga (island fortress): surrounded by a natural body of water, like river or sea. Murud-Janjira is an example.
  - Sthala-durga (plain fortress): surrounded by artificial moats or irrigated by a river. Deeg Fort and Lohagarh Fort are examples.
- Dhanvana-durga or Maru-durga (Desert Fort): surrounded by an arid area of at least 5 yojanas (73 km). Jaisalmer Fort is an example.
- Giri-durga (Hill fort)
  - Prantara-durga: located on a flat hill summit. Medieval forts such as Chittor, Gwalior and Ranthambore are examples.
  - Giri-parshva-durga: fortifications and civilian structures that extend down the hill slope, not just the summit. Taragarh (in Bundi) and Taragarh (in Ajmer) are examples.
  - Guha-durga: located in a valley surrounded by hills, where the outposts and the signal towers are located. The forts and palaces of Udaipur are an example.
- Vana-durga (Forest fort): surrounded by a dense forest over a distance of at least 4 krosas (14.6 km). Kandur and Narayanvanam are examples.
  - Khanjana-durga: built on a fen surrounded by thorny forests. Sangram Durga is an example.
  - Sthambha-durga: built in the forest among tall trees; lacks sufficient water sources. Kavaledurga Fort is an example.
- Mahi-durga (Earthen fort)
  - Mrid-durga: surrounded by earthen walls. Raibania Fort is an example.
  - Parigha-durga: surrounded by earthen walls, as well as stone or brick walls. The walls are at least 5.4 m high and their width is half of their height, the smallest of which is 2.7 m wide. Junagarh Fort is an example.
  - Panka-durga: surrounded by fens or quicksand.
- Nri-durga (Human fort): defended by a large number of loyal and experienced warriors. Usually a city fortress, populated by a substantial garrison. Nagaur Fort is an example.

Each of these types had its own advantages and disadvantages. For example, according to the Manusmṛti, forest forts suffer from monkey attacks, earthen forts get swarmed with rodents and water forts are plagued by diseases, while forts that rely on human defenses require a lot of supplies. Different sources recommended different forts: the Manusmṛti considers the hill fort to be the best defensive structure and some Sanskrit text consider hill forts to be the abode of gods and hence auspicious, but the Mahabharata describes the human fort as the most effective fortification.

=== Medieval India (500 to 1500 CE) ===
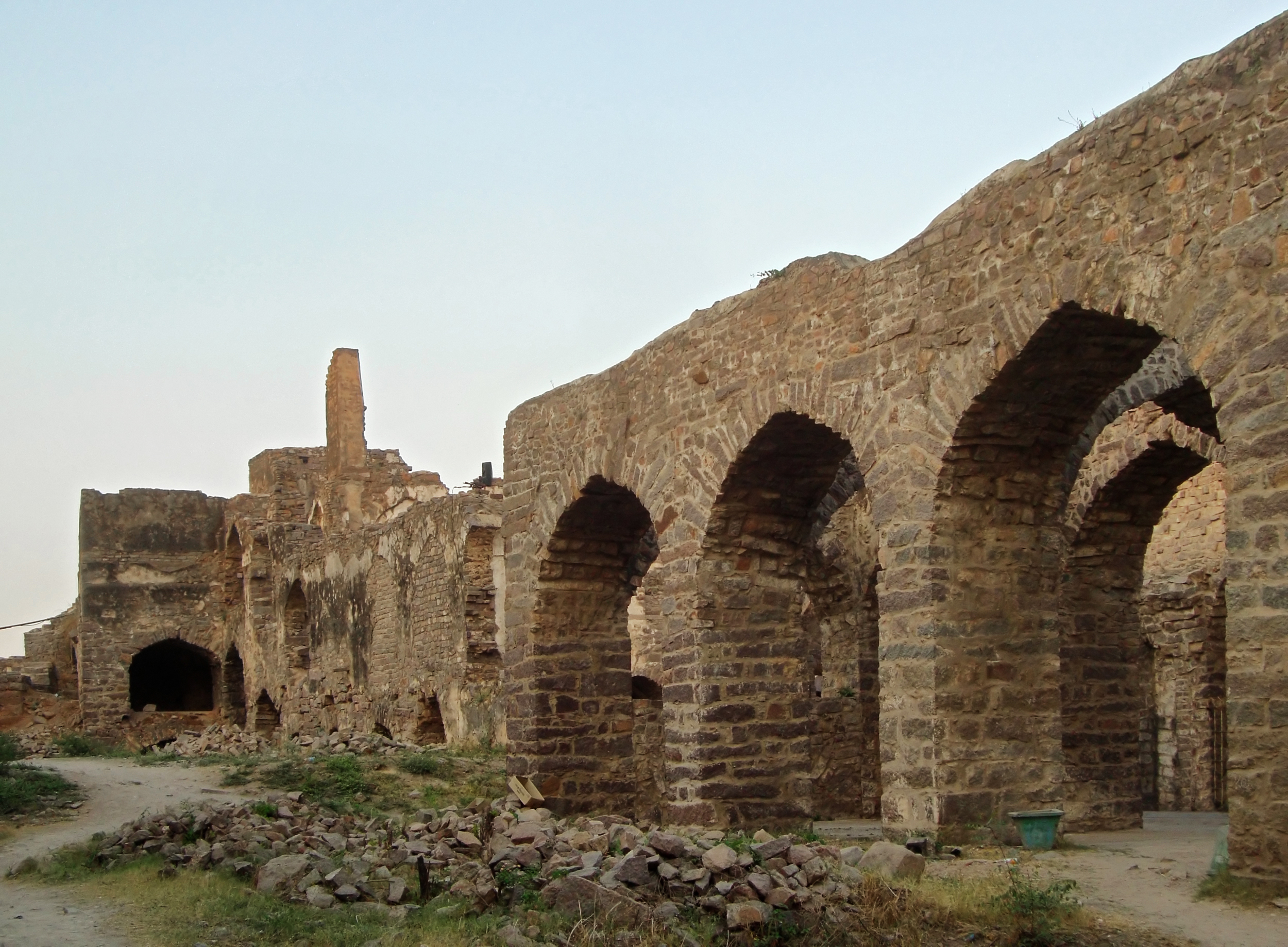
Ruins of Golkonda Fort, Hyderabad

The medieval period saw the decline of large empires like the Guptas and the rise of local lordships. With more raiding and close-range sieges, forts and castles with keeps, moats, gatehouses, and towers controlling roads and territory were constructed. One of the oldest extant forts in India, Qila Mubarak can be found in Bathinda, Punjab, first built some time between the 1st and 6th centuries BCE, possibly by Raja Dab, in a town established around the early 9th century by local Bhatti chiefs. Major hill and plateau forts, combining palaces, temples or mosques and defensive walls were built. These include the Bhatner, Gingee, Jaisalmer, Rajgad and Shivneri forts.

With Muslim conquests and prolonged sieges against castles, the need for layered passive defence and flanking fire increased. The response was concentric layouts, multiple walls, stronger gate systems, and deep defensive zoning. The construction of a citadel, either in the center or a corner or a corner or a fortified city, and the establishment of a greater area between the citadel and the walls was characteristic of medieval forts, due to the same military pressures that led to the Norman motte and bailey. Classic examples of such structures are the Amber, Bidar, Chittor, Chitradurga, Daulatabad, Golkonda, Gulbarga and Ranthambore forts.

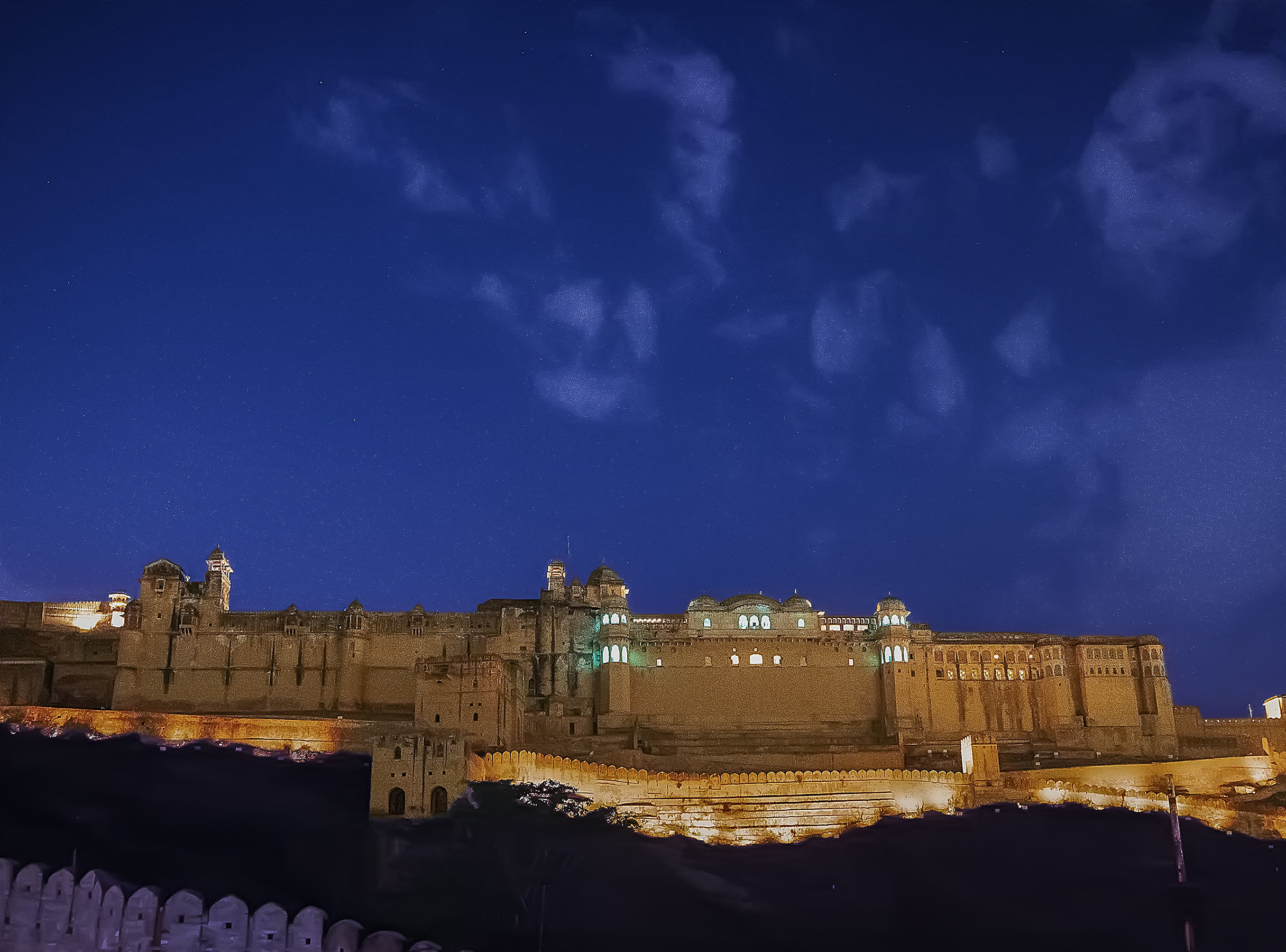
Night View of Amer Fort, Rajasthan, India.

=== Early modern period (1500 to 1800 CE) ===
With the introduction of gunpowder cannons, lower, thicker, larger, artillery-adapted fortresses with curtain walls and bastions were built. Examples include Agra Fort, Fort d’Orléans Chandernagore, Fort Louis (Fort St. Louis), Fort St. David, Manjarabad Fort, and the Red Fort. The Sikh Confederacy began to construct mud-forts, known as garhis, as they began to establish their own states, such as the Phulkians, in the 18th century; these include Qila Mubarak and forts in Nabha and Jind. The Marathas expanded and strengthened many existing hill and sea forts like Raigad, Sindhudurg and Suvarnadurg. With the advent of the East India Company, the British established trading posts (historically, called factories) along the coast. The East India Company's parsimony with regard to materials and artisans and the non-availability of trained engineers initially resulted in weak design and construction. The vulnerability of these earlier forts, hostilities with the French and the growing might of the Company resulted in stronger and more complex designs for the second round of construction. Fort St George in Chennai, Fort William in Kolkata and Bombay Fort were polygonal forts, reflecting the influences of the French engineer Vauban. The cities guarded by these forts developed from the small townships outside the forts and became the centers of individual presidencies. The Sikh Empire also built a number of polygonal forts.

=== Modern period (after 1800 CE) ===
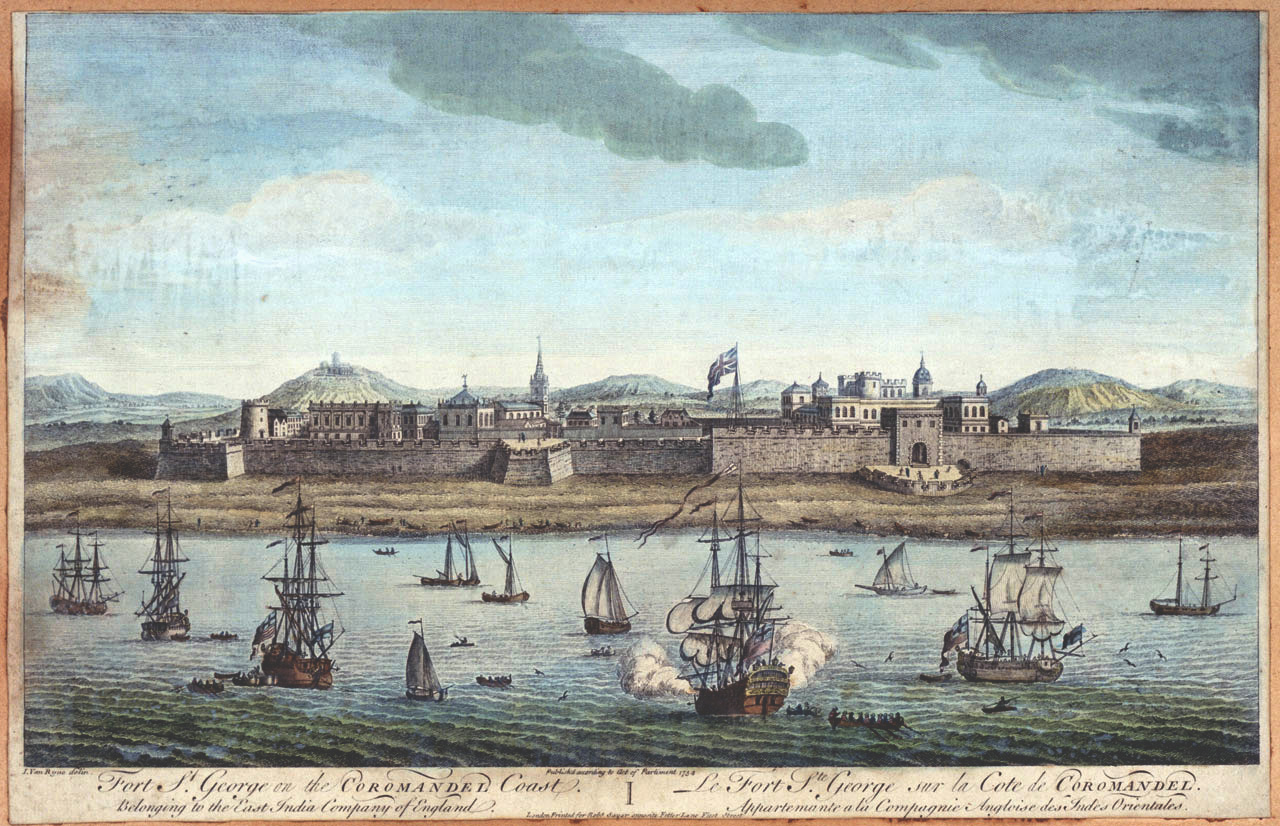
An 18th-century painting of Fort St George, Madras

In 1850, Lord Dalhousie ordered the destruction of many fortresses in Punjab after British annexation. After the Indian Rebellion of 1857, the British converted many pre-existing forts into military barracks and training academies, which damaged the original sites. After the development of longer-range, more accurate, rifled breech loader artillery, which threatened cities from beyond the walls, the style of fortification changed.

==== Current state ====
After the abolition of the privy-purse in 1971, many forts owned by former royal families of the princely states fell into disrepair and neglect. Although no Indian forts have been destroyed by sudden disasters, there are several which were abandoned by their rulers and have consequently deteriorated over time. Some castles were still used as living quarters until the 19th-20th centuries, and so were continually modified. Some of them are private property, and are used as hotels or private museums.

== Construction and style ==
Construction methods depended on the materials available. Stone was the most important material for building fortifications in India. The main binding material for construction was lime mortar.

Walls were erected by one of the three construction methods:

- The first was an earthen rampart, faced with stone on both sides. The rampart was built using the earth excavated while digging the ditch, with three-quarters of it used for building a rampart and one-quarter for leveling out the surface inside the fortress and in front of the ditch. Facing the rampart with stone allowed for the erection of higher and steeper walls than those possible with a purely earthen rampart. The structure had a substantial shortcoming, however: an earthen core accumulated water, which could destroy the stone shell. Drainage channels were therefore installed along the length of the wall from top to bottom.

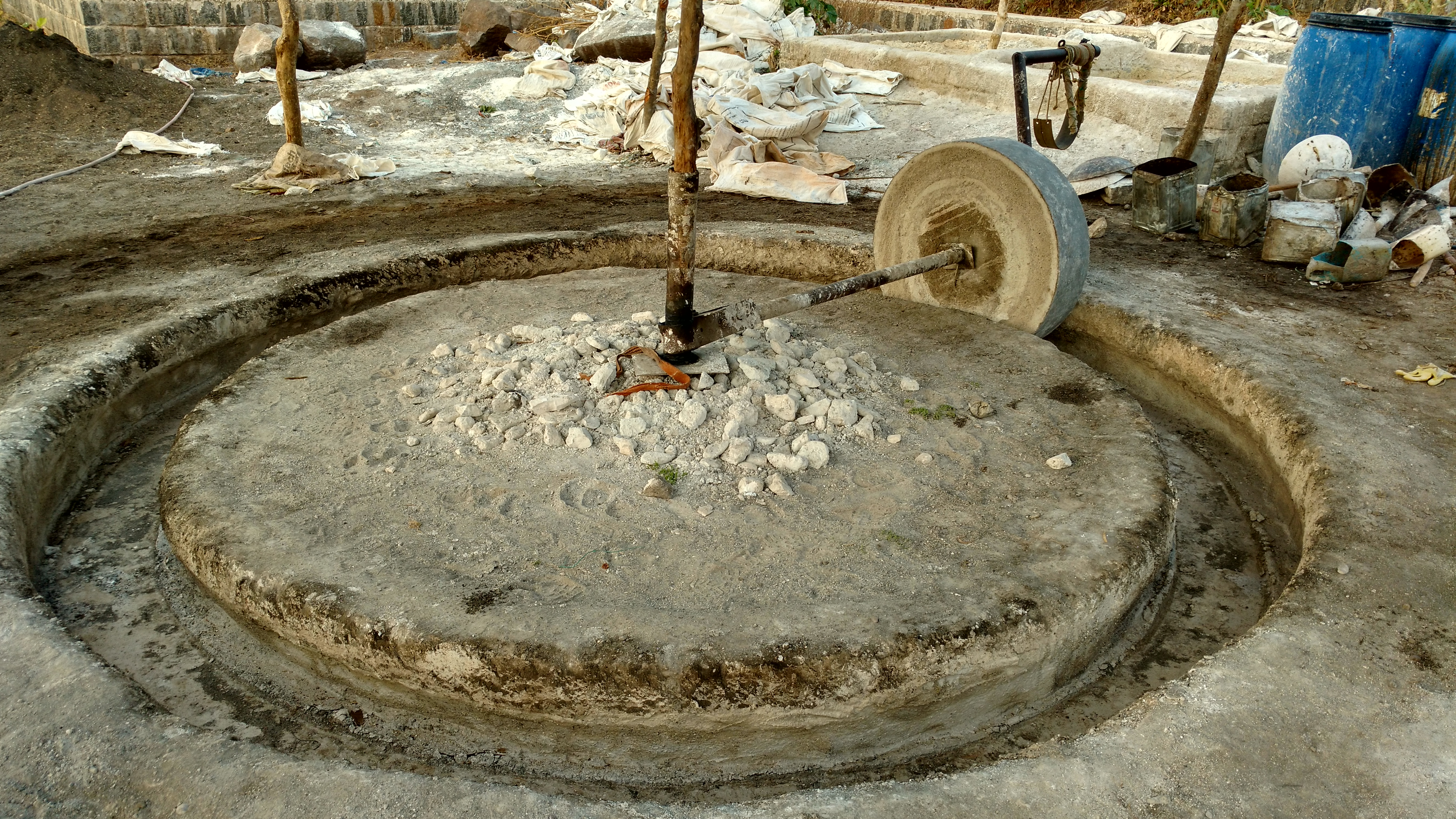
Lime mortar mixer on Rasalgad

- The second method involved filling the space between the outer layers with earth mixed with rubble. This core was considerably harder than simply using rammed earth.
- The third, and most advanced, method involved the use of mortar. A rubble-built wall fastened with mortar was strong and long lasting.

The gates of Indian forts were highly decorated. Two distinct styles are seen: the Hindu style, with a lintel, and the Mughal style, with an arch. Gates in Indian forts were often high and wide to allow elephants to pass. They often had rows of sharp, stout iron spikes, used to dissuade an attacking army from using elephants to break down the gates. One such spiked gate can be seen on the Shaniwarwada fort in Pune. The main gate to the forts usually faced north, in order to avoid its deterioration by the rains, winds and the sun.

The walls of the forts often appeared higher from the outside than the inside, as the forts made use of natural rock formations on hills. This not only gave an illusion of greater height, but also lead to the lower walls of the fort to be entirely made up of natural rock or earthworks, providing an almost perfect defense against the use of a battering ram or war elephants to tear down the walls.

Many Indian fortifications have parapets and crenellations with peculiarly shaped merlons and complicated systems of loopholes, which differ substantially from similar structures in other countries. Typical Indian merlons were semicircular and pointed at the top, although they were sometimes fake: the parapet may be solid and the merlons shown in relief on the outside, as at Chittorgarh. What was unique is the arrangement and direction of loopholes. Loopholes were made both in the merlons themselves, and under the crenels. They could either look forward (to command distant approaches) or downward (to command the foot of the wall). Sometimes, a merlon was pierced with two or three loopholes, but more often, one loophole was divided into two or three slits by horizontal or vertical partitions. The shape of loopholes, as well as the shape of merlons, were not necessarily the same throughout a castle, as shown by Kumbhalgarh.

Along with the fortifications, emphasis was also given on the construction of rock cut water cisterns, ponds, wells and lakes. To avoid evaporation of water, the water bodies were covered. At times, rooms were built close to water bodies to lower the temperatures.

=== Human sacrifice ===
Several reports exist of the practice of burying humans, either dead or alive, in the foundations of fort walls, to ensure their stability. It was believed that the ghosts of the sacrificed would keep evil spirits and bad luck away. During the building of the Siri Fort in Delhi, Alauddin Khalji was reported to have buried 8,000 skulls of Mughals killed by him into the foundation. During the building of Purandar Fort, one its bastions gave way several times. The king of Berar then ordered his minister, Esaji Naik Chive, to bury a first-born son and his wife into the foundation of the bastion. This was promptly done, along with further offering of gold and bricks. When the bastion was finished, Esaji Naik was given possession of the fort and the father of the sacrificed boy was rewarded with two villages.

== See also ==
- List of forts in India
- Hill Forts of Rajasthan

== Notes ==
Exploration of forts on maps

== Bibliography ==
- Fass, Virginia; Sharma, Rita (1986). The Forts of India. London: William Collins Sons. ISBN 0-00-217590-8.
- Nossov, Konstantin; Delf, Brian (2006). Indian Castles 1206-1526 (Illustrated ed.). Osprey. ISBN 1-84603-065-X.
- Sandes, E. W. C. (1934). The Military Engineer in India, Vol. I. Chatham: Institution of Royal Engineers.
- Toy, Sidney (1965). The Fortified Cities of India. London: Heinemann Educational.
- Yule, Paul (2007). Review of J. Deloche, Studies on Fortifications in India, Pondicherry. Zurich.
- Yule, Paul (2009). Early Forts in Eastern India, Antiquity vol 82 issue 316 June 2008, virtual Project Gallery. cambridge. Archived from the original on 24 January 2013.
