= Jagdish Bhola =

Indian wrestler

Jagdish Bhola is a famous wrestler known for his skill and dedication to the sport. Often called the "King Kong" of Indian wrestling, he became well known for his strength and success in the ring. He was honored with the Arjuna Award, one of India’s most prestigious sports awards, recognizing his achievements in wrestling.

== Early life ==
Jagdish Bhola was born in Chauke (dist. Bathinda). Bhola spent most of his childhood with his maternal family. At an early age he was encouraged by his maternal uncle to take up wrestling as a career and was trained by him as well in village Chauke itself, where many national and international players have been produced. Later on Bhola shifted to Ludhiana and joined a renowned akhara to master his skills in wrestling.

== Career ==
As a wrestler he reached fame after earning a silver medal in the 1991 Asian Wrestling Championships, Delhi, he also competed throughout the world. For his wrestling career, Government awarded him with the Arjuna Award. Bhola also appeared in a Punjabi language movie, Rustam-e-Hind which released in 2008. For a brief time Bhola served in the Punjab police as DSP before being suspended by the Punjab Police.

== Decline in career ==
Bhola was subject to controversy when in 2008 he was caught by Mumbai Police for drug peddling. Soon after the government took away his Arjuna award, followed by Punjab police suspending Bhola from his DSP post in 2008.

Bhola restarted his drug trafficking business earning much wealth and possessing two posh bungalows, costly cars and having a sugar mill fitted with high resolution CCTV cameras around its perimeter.

He was arrested again in 2015 by Punjab Police along with Ram Singh, a boxer, for alleged participation in synthetic drug cartel of ₹ 700 crore.

According to sources, Bhola was also convicted for running illegal drug manufacturing business from his home. According to Punjab Police he is the head of the Punjab-based drug racket. The drugs where trafficked from Pakistani border areas and is supplied to Mumbai and parts of Himachal Pradesh.
