= Bir Behman =

Village in Punjab, India

Bir Behman is a village in Bathinda district, Punjab, India. Bir Behman is 9.2 km from its Mandal Main Town Bathinda. Bir Behman is 7.1 km from its District Main City Bathinda. Near this village are a small zoo and park. Bir Behman also decorated with Gurudwara Nanaksar.

Nearby villages are Multania (2.1 km), Behman Dewana (2.9 km), Naruana (5 km), Teona (5.2 km), Chughe Khurd (5.4 km). The village is well connected to Bathinda city. There is a highway and a railway that reach the village.

A large number of educated youth are well employed in Punjab Education department, especially the sports teachers. The village has earned a name for experimentation in advanced agriculture farming and agro-forestry.

Bir Behman is a place of saints; so many holy persons visited here in past. Dhan Dhan Baba Nand Singh ji, Nanaksar wale visited here also. Then after Baba Ram Singh Ji Nanaksar wale visited here and made an Gurudwara Nanaksar and guide so many people for Gurbani and trustworthy lives.
