= Behman Jassa Singh =

- village
- Location in Punjab, India Behman Jassa Singh (India)
- Coordinates: 29.9176099°N 75.1122338°E
- Country: India
- State: Punjab
- District: Bathinda district

Languages
  - Official: Punjabi
- Time zone: UTC+5:30 (IST)
- PIN: 151302

Behman Jassa Singh is a village in Bathinda district in the northern Indian state of Punjab. It is located at longitude 74 56'E and latitude 30 12'N. Its postal pin code is 151302.
