= Bhuchchu railway station =

Railway station in Punjab, India

Bhuchchu

General information
- Location: Bhucho Mandi, Bathinda district, Panjab; India
- Coordinates: 30°12′36″N 75°05′43″E
- Elevation: 242 metres (794 ft)
- System: Indian Railways station
- Owner: Indian Railways
- Operator: Northern Railway
- Line: Bathinda–Rajpura line
- Platforms: 2
- Tracks: Double Electric-Line

Construction
- Structure type: Standard (on ground)

Other information
- Status: Functioning
- Station code: BCU
- Zone(s): Northern Railway
- Division(s): Ambala

Services
Preceding station	Indian Railways	Following station
Bathinda Cantonment towards ?	Northern Railway zone Bathinda–Rajpura line	Lahira Khana towards ?
Location
- Interactive map

Bhuchchu railway station is a railway station in located on Bathinda–Rajpura railway line operated by the Northern Railway under Ambala railway division. It is situated at Bhucho Mandi in Bathinda district in the Indian state of Panjab.
