= Maiser Khana =

Religion
- Affiliation: Hinduism
- District: Bathinda
- Deity: Goddess Durga

Location
- Location: 29 kilometers away from Bathinda
- State: Punjab
- Country: India

Maiser Khana is a temple built to honour the Goddesses Durga and Jwala Ji. It is built 29 kilometers away from Bathinda, Punjab, India, on Bathinda-Mansa Road. Each year two grand melas are held here on Ashtami. According to a legend, long ago, a person called "Kamala", having failed to undertake hazardous pilgrimage to far off Jwala ji, underwent a lifelong penance to honour Durga for her darshan and the goddess was pleased to grant him a vision twice a year, so two melas are held each year. People gather from almost all over from Punjab and even nearby states to join in singing hymns in praise of the deity. This is also considered important from political point of view because both Sikhs and Hindus gather with equal enthusiasm. As early as 1951 the devotees had requested Mahavir Dal to take over the shrine, which was decaying due to Government indifference. Only then the three high-ups namely Radheshyam Budhlada, Jagannath ji of Maur Mandi and Hansraj Aggarwal collected funds and hired India's best architects to build the temple. It was one of the nine spots the Bathinda administration claimed would be developed to turn the district into tourist hub of Punjab.
