= Dan Singhwala =

Coordinates: 30°18′N 75°36′E

Dan Singhwala is a village in the Bathinda district of Punjab, India.
