= Chauke =

Chauke Chaoke, Chau
- Town
- Nickname: Chau
- Location within Punjab Location within India
- Coordinates: 30°11′04″N 75°20′11″E
- Country: India
- State: Punjab
- District: Bathinda

Government
  - Type: Democratic
  - Body: Nagar Panchayat

Population (2011)
  - Total: About 11,000 (7,386 voters)

Languages
- Time zone: UTC+5:30 (IST)
- PIN: 151510
- Telephone code: 01651
- Vehicle registration: PB 03
- Nearest city: Maur Mandi, Rampura Phul
- Literacy: About 70%
- Lok Sabha constituency: Bathinda (Lok Sabha constituency)
- Vidhan Sabha constituency: Maur Mandi
- Civic agency: Nagar panchayat (11 members)
- Climate: Extreme in either seasons (Köppen)
- Website: https://www.facebook.com/dashmeshchauke/

Chauke (also known as Chau or Chaoke, Chouke) is a town of Malwa in the Bathinda district of Punjab state, India. It comes under the Maur Mandi assembly constituency. It shares its boundaries with the Bathinda and Barnala districts of Punjab.

== Location ==
Chauke is located approximately 15 kilometres from both Maur Mandi and Rampura Phul, and 7 kilometers from Mandi Kalan. Other cities central to Chauke are Tapa Mandi as well as Mansa. It is located approximately 8 kilometers from Mansa-Barnala main road.

== Population ==
Chauke's population is approximately 12000 with voting population of 7386(according to voter list of January 2017), making it one of the Biggest village of the constituency Maur Mandi.

== Education ==
Chauke has a Government Secondary School, One Adarsh Public school, two primary schools, and many private schools are located in this town.

== Commerce ==
Along with a dispensary and Anaaj Mandi (Grain Market), the village has a stadium. There is a branch of the State Bank of India and also Cooperative bank. There are six medical stores.

== Transportation ==
It has 6 bus stops to cover each corner of the village and 3Petrol Pump has also come up in the village. Village is well connected with all the neighboring villages and to the cities through a proper transport network. Most of the roads are upgraded from 11 feet to 18 feet in 2016-17 by the govt.

== Utilities ==
A newly 66 KV Power station has also started working from the January 2007 which has given this a village an additional advantage. RO system also working here although two big water tanks working. Village has a big playground[6 acre] along with Anaaj Mandi.

== Society ==
Village has three Gurudwara Sahibs, a Masjid and Temple along with revered Shiv-dwala. Then there are two deras namely Dera Baba Dunna Ji (Punjabi:ਬਾਬਾ ਦੁੱਨਾ ਜੀ) and Dera Baba Bulla Ji (Punjabi:ਬਾਬਾ ਬੂਲਾ ਜੀ). There is a Youth club Shaheed Baba Mahaa Singh Youth Welfare Club in the village along with Patwar-Khana (Place for Patwari).

== Culture ==
The villagers celebrate renowned four day mela called Maaghi Da Mela (Punjabi:ਮਾਘੀ ਦਾ ਮੇਲਾ) from 14 January, annually. Distant visitors come to pray at Dera Baba Dunna Ji and Dera Baba Bulla Ji. The four day mela consists of sports activities (Punjabi:ਖੇਡ ਮੇਲਾ) Kabaddi, wrestling, Dog racing, Volleyball, Tug of war, playing card's games & much more. The villager also celebrate regular Indian functions like New moon, Black moon along with religious festivals of Sikhs, Hindus & Muslims.

== Politics ==
In the town, there is a bipolar fight between two major political parties named Shiromani Akali Dal and Indian National Congress.Town is dominated by Shiromani Akali Dal as the party is ruling the Town since 1981, losing only in 1989 elections to an independent named Harnek Singh. Currently there are 9 MC's from the ruling Shiromani Akali Dal and 2 from Congress elected in February 2015. Town is headed by present S. Gurdeep Singh (Sarpanch of Chauke).
