= Bhagta Bhai Ka =

- village
- Nickname: Bhagta
- Location in Punjab, India Bhagta Bhai Ka (India)
- Coordinates: 30.4812°N 75.094°E
- Country: India
- State: Punjab
- District: Bathinda

Government
  - Body: Municipality

Population (2011)
  - Total: 12,587

Languages
  - Official: Punjabi
- Time zone: UTC+5:30 (IST)
- PIN: 151206
- Telephone code: 01651
- Vehicle registration: PB 03

Bhagta Bhai Ka is a village in the Bathinda district in the Indian state of Punjab. It is about 38 km from Bathinda city. It is a sub-tehsil of Phul town of assembly area Rampura Phul. Gurduwara Mehal sahib and Bhootan wala khooh are notable places.
