= Rampura Phul Assembly constituency =

Legislative Assembly constituency in Punjab State, India

Coordinates: 30.27°N 75.24°E

Rampura Phul
- Constituency No. 90 for the Punjab Legislative Assembly

Constituency details
- Country: India
- State: Punjab
- District: Bathinda
- Lok Sabha constituency: Faridkot
- Total electors: 170,676
- Reservation: None

Member of Legislative Assembly
- 16th Punjab Legislative Assembly
- Incumbent Balkar Singh Sidhu
- Party: Aam Aadmi Party
- Elected year: 2022

Rampura Phul Assembly constituency is one of the 117 Legislative Assembly constituencies of Punjab state in India. It is part of Bathinda district.

== Members of the Legislative Assembly ==
Most successful parties from Rampura Phul Vidhan Sabha
1. INC (6 Times) (33.3%)
2. SAD (6 Times) (33.3%)
3. CPI (5 Times) (27.8%)
4. AAP (1 Time) (5.56%)

Year	Member	Party
As part of PEPSU Legislative Assembly (1951–56)
"Sehna Phul constituency"
1952	Gurdial Singh	Shiromani Akali Dal
"Phul constituency"
1954	Dhanna Singh	Shiromani Akali Dal
1954	Arjan Singh	Communist Party of India
As part of Punjab Legislative Assembly (1956–Present)
1957	Ram Nath	Indian National Congress
1962	Babu Singh	Communist Party of India
1967	H. Singh	Indian National Congress
1957	Babu Singh	Communist Party of India
1972	Harbans Singh	Shiromani Akali Dal
"Rampura Phul constituency"
1977	Babu Singh	Communist Party of India
1980	Babu Singh	Communist Party of India
1985	Sukhdev Singh	Shiromani Akali Dal
1992	Harbans Singh	Indian National Congress
1997	Sikander Singh Maluka	Shiromani Akali Dal
2002	Gurpreet Singh Kangar	Indian National Congress
2007	Gurpreet Singh Kangar	Indian National Congress
2012	Sikander Singh Maluka	Shiromani Akali Dal
2017	Gurpreet Singh Kangar	Indian National Congress
2022	Balkar Singh Sidhu	Aam Aadmi Party

== Election results ==
=== 2027 ===
Punjab Assembly election, 2027: Rampura Phul
Party	Candidate	Votes	%	±%
AAP				
AD (WPD)				New entry
INC				
BSP				
SAD				
BJP				New entry
NOTA	None of the above			
Majority				
Turnout				

=== 2022 ===
Punjab Assembly election, 2022: Rampura Phul
Party	Candidate	Votes	%	±%
AAP	Balkar Singh Sidhu	56,155	41.50	▲17.49
SAD	Sikander Singh Maluka	45,745	33.80	▲0.84
INC	Gurpreet Singh Kangar	28,185	20.80	▼19.79
SAD(A)	Baljinder Singh	2,541	1.90	New entry
PLC	Amarjit Singh Sharma	1,041	0.80	New entry
NOTA	None of the above	720	0.40	
Majority		10,410	7.65	
Turnout		136,089	79.7	
Registered electors				
AAP gain from INC				

=== 2017 ===
Punjab Assembly election, 2017: Rampura Phul
Party	Candidate	Votes	%	±%
INC	Gurpreet Singh Kangar	55,269	40.59	▼1.17
SAD	Sikander Singh Maluka	44,884	32.96	▼12.84
AAP	Manjit Singh Sidhu	32,693	24.01	New entry
NOTA	None of the above	445	0.33	
Majority		10,385	7.63	
Turnout		136,162	86.19	
Registered electors		158,494		
INC gain from SAD		Swing		

=== 2012 ===
Punjab Assembly election, 2012: Rampura Phul
Party	Candidate	Votes	%	±%
SAD	Sikandar Singh Maluka	58,141	45.80	▼0.73
INC	Gurpreet Singh Kangar	53,005	41.76	▼6.68
PPoP	Lakhvir Singh Sidhana	10,065	7.93	New entry
BSP	Randhir Singh	1,454	1.15	▼0.07
Independent	Dr. Amarjit Singh	1,304	1.03	New entry
Majority		5,136	4.05	
Turnout		126,933	87.22	
Registered electors		145,535		
SAD gain from INC		Swing		

== See also ==
- List of constituencies of the Punjab Legislative Assembly
- Bathinda district
