= Bathinda Cantonment railway station =

Railway station in Bathinda, Punjab

Bathinda Cantt Railway Station

General information
- Location: Cantt Area, Bathinda Cantonment, Punjab; India
- Coordinates: 30.2003°N 75.0228°E
- Elevation: 208 metres (682 ft)
- System: Indian Railways junction station
- Owner: Indian Railways
- Operator: Northern Railway
- Line: Bathinda–Rajpura line
- Platforms: 1
- Tracks: 5 ft 6 in (1,676 mm) broad gauge

Construction
- Structure type: Standard on ground
- Parking: Yes
- Cycle facilities: No

Other information
- Status: Functioning
- Station code: BTIC
- Division(s): Ambala

Services
Preceding station	Indian Railways	Following station
Bhuchchu towards ?	North Western Railway zone Bathinda–Rajpura line	Bathinda towards ?
Location

Bathinda Cantt Railway Station is a small railway station in Bathinda, Punjab, serving Bathinda city. Its code is BTIC. It has 2 platforms, which are not well sheltered, and lacks water and sanitation facilities.

== Major trains ==
- Kalka–Barmer Express
- Barmer–Haridwar Link Express
- Kalka–Barmer Chandigarh Express
- Kalka–Shri Ganganagar Express
- Dhuri–Bhatinda Passenger
- Bhatinda–Ambala Passenger
- Ambala Cantt–Shri Ganganagar Passenger
