= Vena Pal =

Purported ruler of the Bathinda region

Vena Pal, also known as Ven or Raja Bineypal, is the name of a purported raja of the Bathinda region. (Note: Vena Pal's name is alternatively rendered as 'Vinaipal', 'Binaypal', 'Bhainipal', 'Bena Pal', 'Benapal', or 'Venapal'.) Vena Pal was a Hindu Rajput ruler. According to lore recounted by Giani Gian Singh, Vena Pal is said to have been the son of Surpal of Bhatner. Vena Pal was exiled by his step-mother and wandered in the jungle, eventually he witnessed a she-goat fighting two wolves to save its offspring, and was moved by the scene. The location where he witnessed the scene is said to have been the present-day location of Bathinda.

According to tradition, the Bathinda Fort was built by an ancestor of Vena Pal named Raja Deb. In local traditional lore, Vena Pal is connected to Baba Rattan. However, there are various versions of the tradition that connects the two figures together. One version states that Baba Rattan arrived in Bathinda from Medina in 668 Bk. (611–612 C.E. or 24 A.H.) and became the prime minister of Raja Vena Pal. Some sources claim Vena Pal was a contemporary of the Islamic prophet Muhammad whilst others state that he lived much later, being contemporary with Muhammad of Ghor, who he was defeated by. According to Visakha Singh, the Gills of Moga trace their origin to Vena Pal, having founded the settlement of Moga after their dispersal from Bhatinda in the aftermath of the Islamic conquest and dissolution of Vena Pal's dynasty in Bhatinda. Visakha Singh blames the fall of the polity to an individual named Rattan Mal, a Muslim Siddha, who betrayed the dynasty in-favour of the invaders. Alongside Bhatinda, the settlements of Bitli and Bhatner of Marwar were also ravaged.
