= Bhucho Mandi =

Bhucho Mandi Bhucho
- Suburb
- Location in Punjab, India Bhucho Mandi (India)
- Coordinates: 30.2233°N 75.1017°E
- Country: India
- State: Punjab
- District: Bathinda
- Elevation: 528 m (1,732 ft)

Population (2011)
  - Total: 14,961

Languages
  - Official: Punjabi
- Time zone: UTC+5:30 (IST)
- PIN: 151101
- Telephone code: 0164
- Vehicle registration: Pb-03

Bhucho Mandi is a suburb of Bathinda and a municipal council in Bathinda district in the state of Punjab, India.Bhucho mandi is popular for dera baba rumi wala. It is close to adesh university.

== Demographics ==
According to the 2011 census, Bhucho Mandi has population of 14,961 of which 7,805 are males and 7,156 are females. The female sex ratio was 917 against the state average of 895.

Children aged 0–6 numbered 1,718 (11.48%). The child female sex ratio was around 928 compared to the state average of 846.

The literacy rate was 76.25%, higher than state average of 75.84%. Male literacy was 82.14% and female literacy 69.82%.

The table below shows the population of different religious groups in Bhucho Mandi city, as of 2011 census.

Population by religious groups in Bhucho Mandi city, 2011 census
Religion	Total	Female	Male
Hindu	9,578	4,582	4,996
Sikh	4,969	2,377	2,592
Muslim	320	156	164
Buddhist	19	12	7
Christian	12	5	7
Jain	5	2	3
Not stated	58	22	36
Total	14,961	7,156	7,805

== Economy ==
Mandi is known for its marbles, tiles and carpets work. It is a centre for the trade for farmers from near by villages.

The Bhucho Mandi area has one of the biggest food-grain and cotton markets in Bathinda.

Industries in Bhucho Mandi include cotton ginning, rice mill, non-woven fabric carry bags, cotton cake and oil factories.

== Politics ==
Bhucho Mandi is divided into 13 wards for which elections are held every five years. Once known as a well planned city is now the days due to apathy of state government is becoming the dirties city.

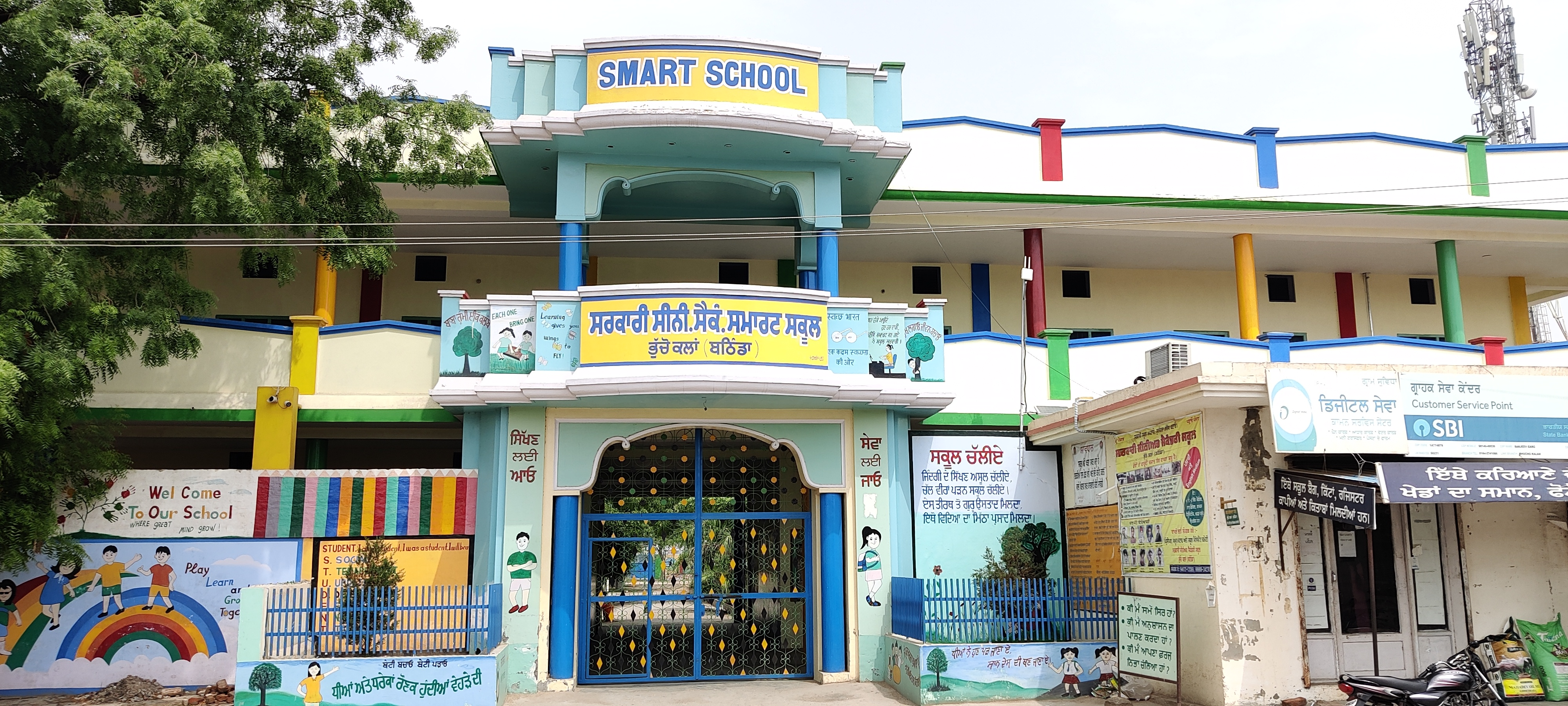
Entrance of Govt. Senior Secondary School Bhucho Kalan(Bathinda)

== Transport ==
Bhuchchu railway station is the nearest railway connection of Bhucho Mandi area, situated on Bathinda–Rajpura line.
