= Sikander Singh Maluka =

Indian politician

MLA, Punjab
- In office 1997 - 2002
- Preceded by: Harbhans Singh
- Succeeded by: Gurpreet Singh Kangar
- Constituency: Rampura Phul
- In office 2012 - 2017
- Preceded by: Gurpreet Singh Kangar

Minister for Education
- In office 2012 - 2017
- Preceded by: Sewa Singh Sekhwan

Personal details
- Born: 20 June 1949 (age 77) Maluka, Bhatinda, Punjab, India
- Party: Shiromani Akali Dal
- Spouse: Surjit Kaur
- Children: Gurpreet Singh, Charanjit Singh

Sikander Singh Maluka is an Indian politician and belongs to the non ruling Shiromani Akali Dal party. He was minister for Rural Development and Panchayats in the Akali Punjab Government.

== Early life ==
Maluka was born on 20 June 1949 at Maluka in Bathinda district. His father's name is S. Kartar Singh and mother's name Mata Chatin Kaur. He is married to Surjit kaur. The couple have two sons, Gurpreet Singh and Charanjit Singh.

== Political career ==
He was elected to the Punjab Legislative Assembly in 1997 on an Akali Dal ticket from Rampura Phul for first time. He lost the next two elections from Rampura in 2002 and 2007. He was re-elected from Rampura in 2012. After 2012 elections, he was made Minister for Education and Higher Education & Languages. He is also the president of Punjab Kabaddi Association and Chairman All India Circle Style Kabaddi, Vice President Punjab Olympic Association, Chairman, District Planning Committee Distt. Bathinda (Govt. of Punjab), President Shromani Akali Dal Distt. Bathinda, Member core Committee and Political Affairs Committee of Shromani Akali Dal, Vice President of Administrative Committee of World Kabbadi Cup 2010 and 2011. On 20 November 2015, Sikander Singh Maluka was assaulted by an elderly farmer in Hamirgarh village in Bathinda district of the Indian state of Punjab. He was able to escape without any visible injury.
