= Raja Dab =

Purported ruler of the Bathinda region

Raja Dab, also spelt as Raja Deb, was a purported ruler (raja) of the Bathinda region of Malwa, Punjab who is credited with constructing the Qila Mubarak out of mud-bricks. His descendant was Raja Vena Pal. One source claims he lived in the 6th century contemporary with invading Hunas whilst other sources places him earlier. The establishment of the settlement of Bathinda itself is credited to another ruler, Rao Bhati, in other sources.
