= Qila Mubarak, Bathinda =

Fort in Bathinda

Qila Mubarak
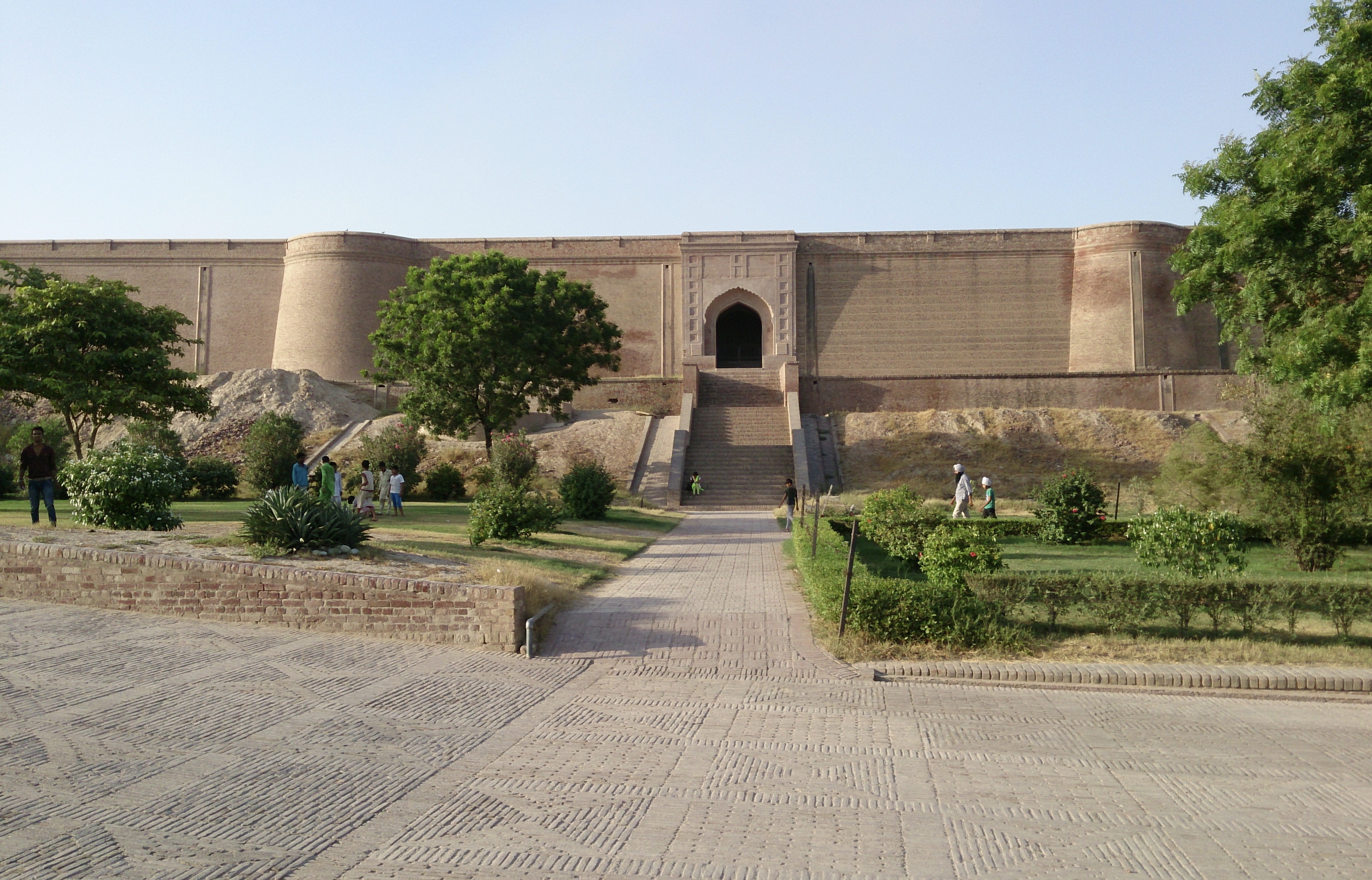
- Qila Mubarak in 2015

- Location in Punjab Qila Mubarak, Bathinda (Punjab)
- 30°12′29″N 74°56′15″E
- Location: Bhatinda, Punjab, India

History
- Built: 6th century CE

Site notes
- Height: 30 m (98 ft)
- Restored by: Maharaja of Patiala
- Governing body: Government of Punjab, India (Since abolishment of Patiala state & accedence within Union of India )

Qila Mubarak, also known as Gobindgarh or Bathinda Fort, is a historical monument in the heart of the city of Bathinda in Punjab, India. It is recognised as monument of national importance and maintained by Archaeological Survey of India. It has been in existence from 1100 to 1200 AD in its current place and is the oldest surviving fort in India. It was here that Razia Sultan, the first woman to take charge of the Delhi throne was incarcerated upon her defeat and dethroned. The bricks of the fort date back to the Kushana period when emperor Kanishka ruled over Northern India/Bactria. Raja Dab, along with emperor Kanishka, is believed to have built the fort. Qila Mubarak in latter part of the 10th Century was under the rule of Jayapala, a ruler of the Hindu Shahi dynasty. Much of the fortress is closed-off to the public, aside from lawns and the gurdwaras.

== Architecture ==
The Imperial Gazetteer of India describes the fort having 36 bastions and a height of about 118 ft. It was a conspicuous landmark for many miles around. A gurdwara located on its ramparts marks the visit of Guru Gobind Singh to the fort. The Rani Mahal located above the fort's entrance was a later addition.

== History ==
=== Early history ===
The bricks used to construct the fort dates back to the Kushana period. The fort was constructed by the king so that Huns could not invade the kingdom of Emperor Kanishka. The Qila Mubarak of Bathinda is purported to have been constructed by Raja Dab, a local ruler. Raja Dab was the ancestor of Vena Pal, another local ruler later on. According to Puneetinder Sidhu, the fortress was constructed around the early 9th century by the local Bhatti Rajput rulers of the region. Hindu chronicles of Kashmir described it as Jaipal's capital, and say it was captured by Mahmud of Ghazni.

=== Sultanates and Mughals ===
In the later years, the fort has undergone various types of alteration done by the rulers of the area. Bhatinda appears in the works of the historians from early Muhammadan period as Batrinda, often incorrectly converted into Tabarhind. The location in the early Muslim chronociles is described as Tabarhind, ruled by Altunia. Razia Sultana, the first empress of Delhi had been imprisoned in Quila Mubarak by Altunia, who had rebelled against her rule. Razia Sultana escaped from the fort and married Altunia, with them re-capturing Delhi and later being killed. The fortress was enhanced many times under the rule of the Mughal Empire, especially under Mughal Emperor Akbar.

=== Sikh period ===
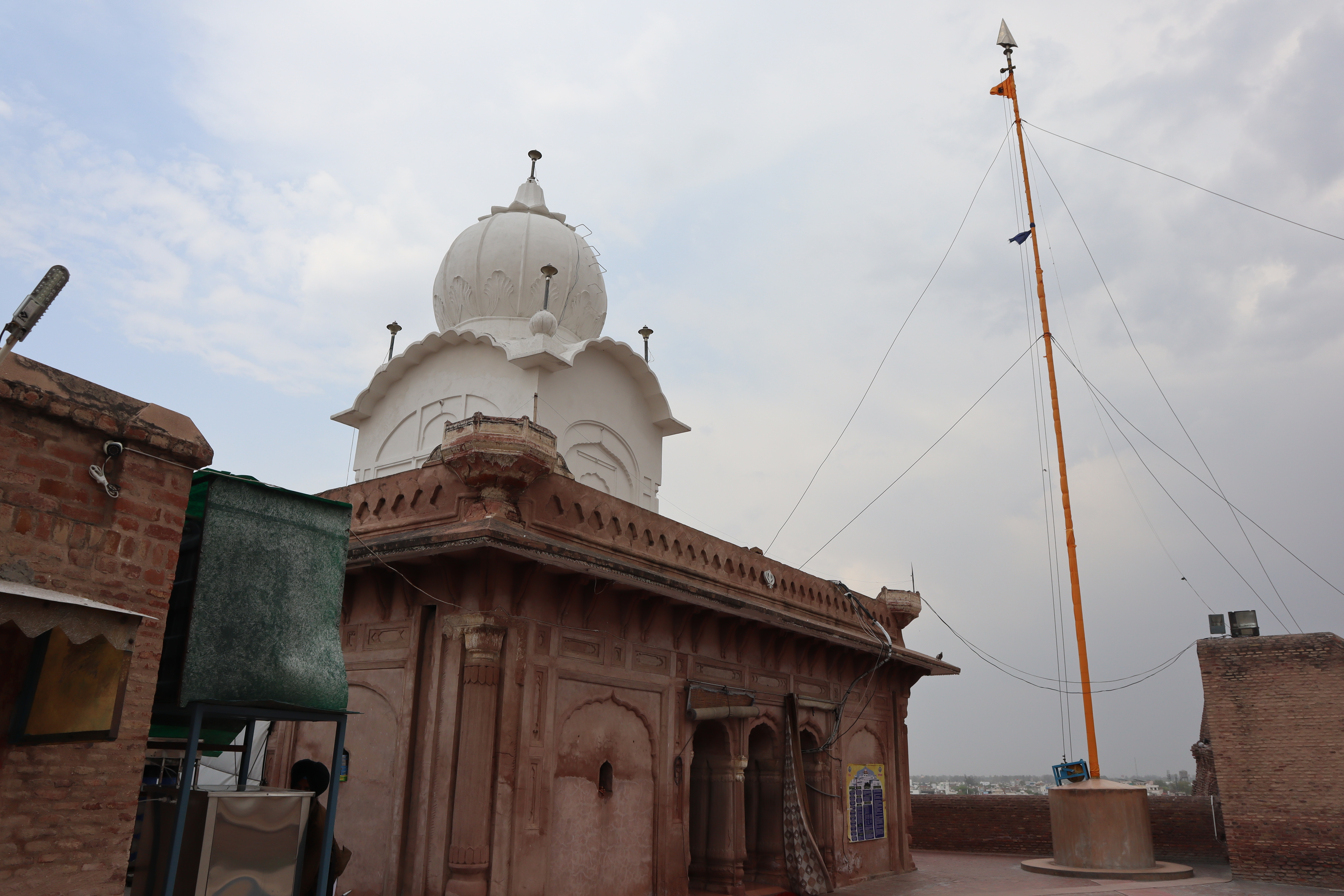
Photograph of Gurdwara Sri Qila Mubarak Sahib at Qila Mubarak (Bathinda Fort), Bathinda, Punjab, India, April 2023

In 1754, Baba Ala Singh of Patiala state took control of Qila Mubarak and renamed it Gobindgarh to honor Guru Gobind Singh. Before this, local say that Guru Nanak Dev, the first Sikh guru, visited the fort in 1515, and Guru Tegh Bahadur, the ninth Sikh guru, visited around 1665. Many years later, in 1705, Guru Gobind Singh came to the fort after his victory at the Battle of Muktsar. To commemorate Guru Gobind Singh’s visit, two gurdwaras were later constructed within the fort complex, one of which was built by Karam Singh, a former ruler of Patiala. The main gurdwara structure of Gurdwara Qila Mubarak, Bathinda was originally built in 1835 during the reign of Maharaja Karam Singh of Patiala in the Phulkian style of Sikh architecture, one of the few surviving original gurdwara structures created during his reign.

== See also ==
- Qila Mubarak, Patiala
- Bathinda district

== Gallery ==
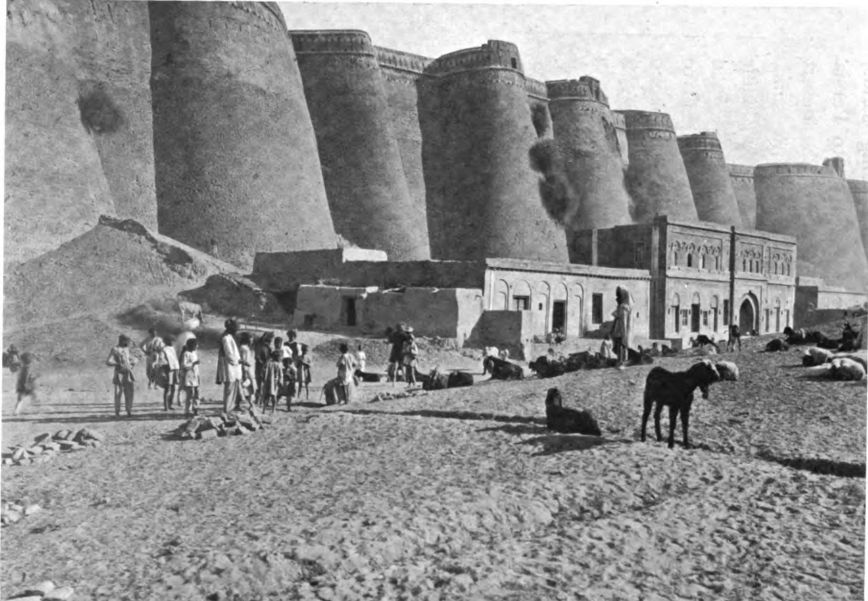
Bathinda Fort in 1906

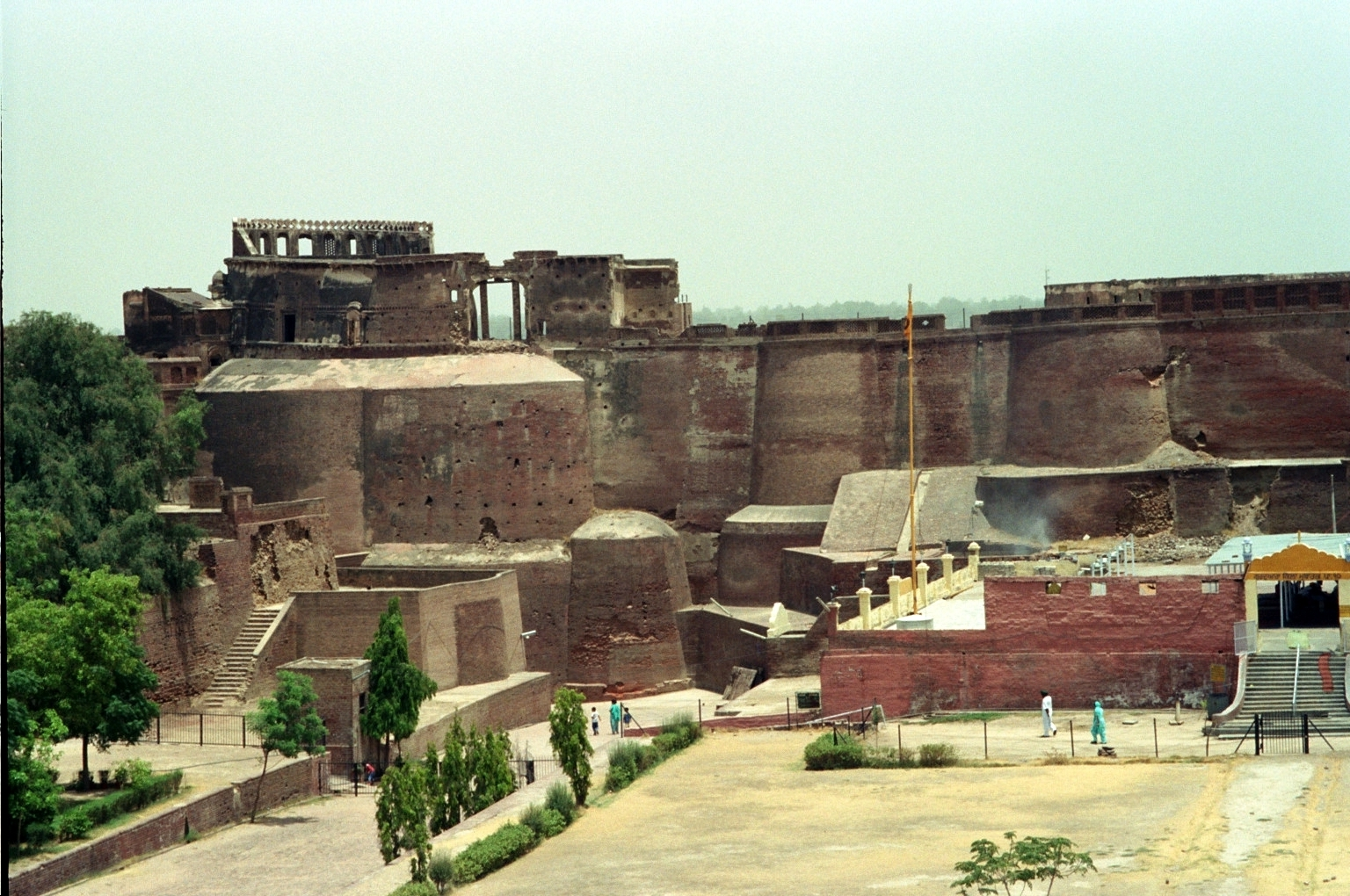
View from inside the Fort

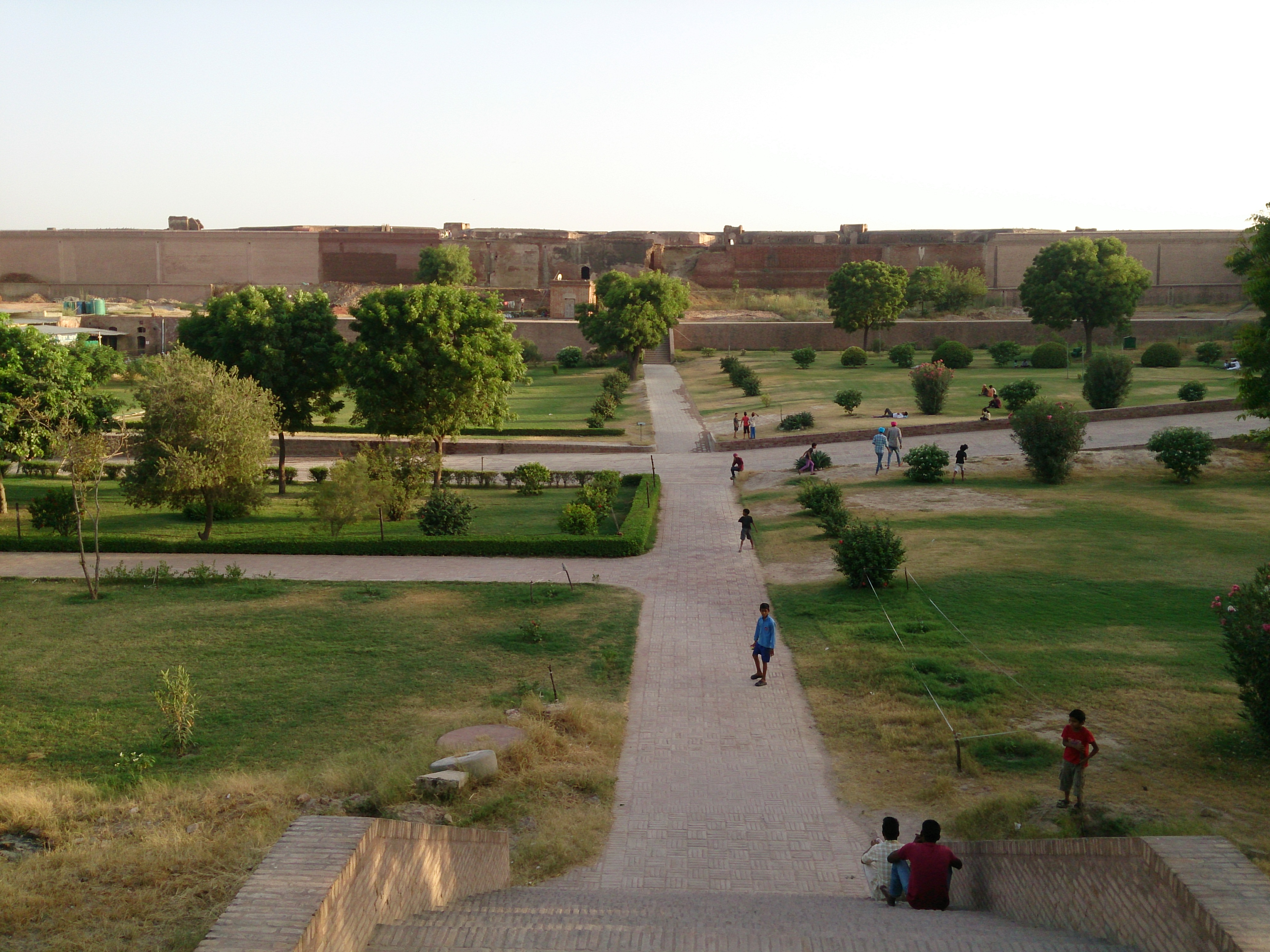
Qila Mubarak inside view

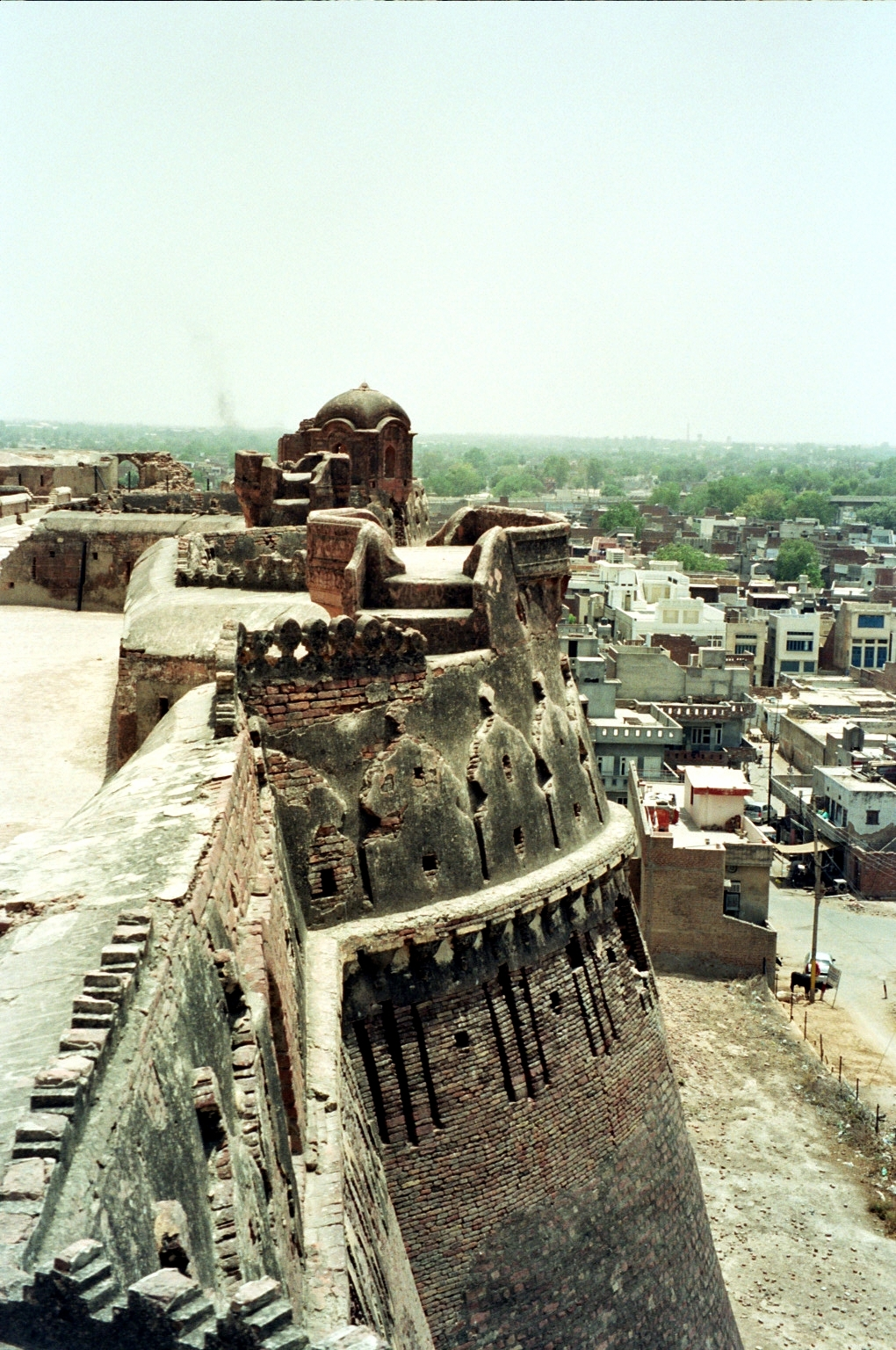
View from top terrace of Fort, June 2003

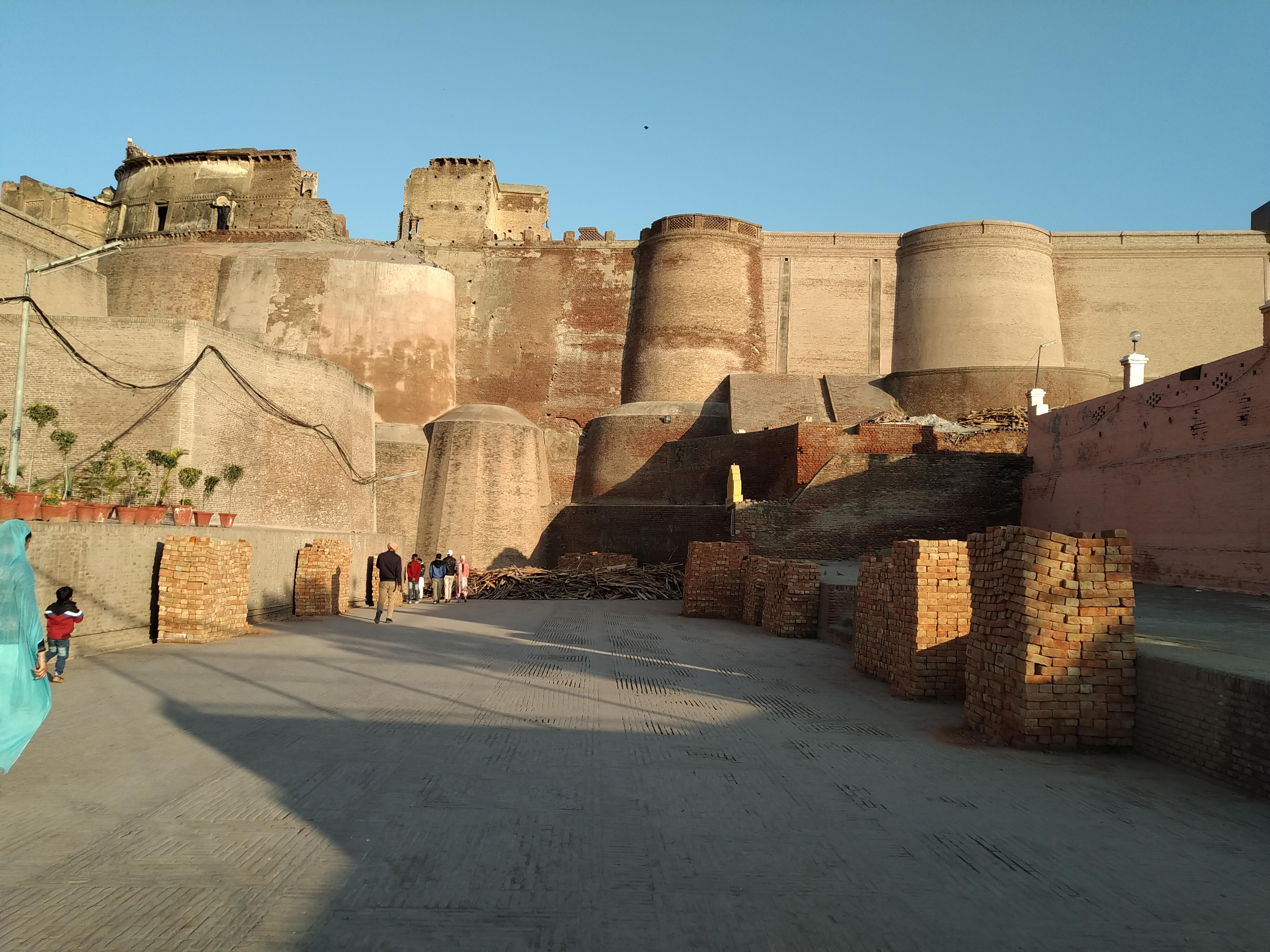
The fort of Govindgarh
