= Gurpreet Singh Kangar =

Indian politician

Member of Punjab Legislative Assembly
- Incumbent
- Assumed office 2017
- Preceded by: Sikander Singh Maluka
- Succeeded by: Balkar Sidhu
- Constituency: Rampura Phul

Personal details
- Born: 1 September 1966 (age 59) kangar
- Party: Indian National Congress
- Profession: Agriculturist, Social Service
- As of August, 2020

Gurpreet Singh Kangar is an Indian politician from Punjab, India. He was a member of Punjab Legislative Assembly and was also a minister in Second Amarinder Singh ministry. He had won the assembly election as a member of Indian National Congress.
