= Maur Mandi =

Maur Mandi Maur
- Town
- Location in Punjab, India
- Coordinates: 30.08°N 75.25°E
- Country: India
- State: Punjab
- District: Bathinda
- Founder: Maan singh

Government
  - Type: Democracy
- Elevation: 212 m (696 ft)

Population (2011)
  - Total: 31,849

Languages
  - Official: Punjabi
- Time zone: UTC+5:30 (IST)
- PIN: 151509
- Vehicle registration: PB 80

Maur is a sub-town of Bathinda City and a municipal council in Bathinda district in the Indian state of Punjab.It has a class II Municipal committee, located on the Bathinda- Delhi railway line, and the Bathinda-Mohali (Ajitgarh) state highway (no. 12-A). This State Highway has now been upgraded to National Highway NH 148B (Bathinda-Kotputli, Jaipur National Highway). Maur Mandi is about 35 km from Bathinda city.

== History ==
The suburb town is said to have been founded by one Maur, a Jat of Mann sub caste. There exists a Gurudwara which is associated with the visit of Sri Guru Teg Bahadur, the ninth Guru of the Sikhs. It is said that the guru stayed here for a few days and got rid the villagers of a ghost. A fair is held here on every Amavas. The town is known for the manufacture of agricultural items. Government of Punjab has upgraded Maur from the status of sub-tehsil to Sub-Divisional headquarters in the year 2013. This is the fourth sub-division of Bathinda district, Punjab.

== Geography ==
Maur is located at 30.08°N 75.25°E. It has an average elevation of 212 metres (695 feet).Situated on Bathinda Mansa road at a distance of 35 km from Bathinda, the district headquarters, Maur (also called Maur Mandi) is a railway station on the Firozpur - Bathinda - New Delhi railway line. It has become its own tehsil. It is well connected by road with the State headquarters, Chandigarh (187 km), Patiala (122 km), Talwandi Sabo (18 km) and Bathinda (35 km).

== Demographics ==
As of 2011 India census, Maur had a population of 31,849. Males constitute 53% of the population and females 47%. Maur has an average literacy rate of 78%, higher than the national average of 59.5%: male literacy is 85%, and female literacy is 79%. In Maur, 13% of the population is under 6 years of age.
