= Bathinda district =

- District
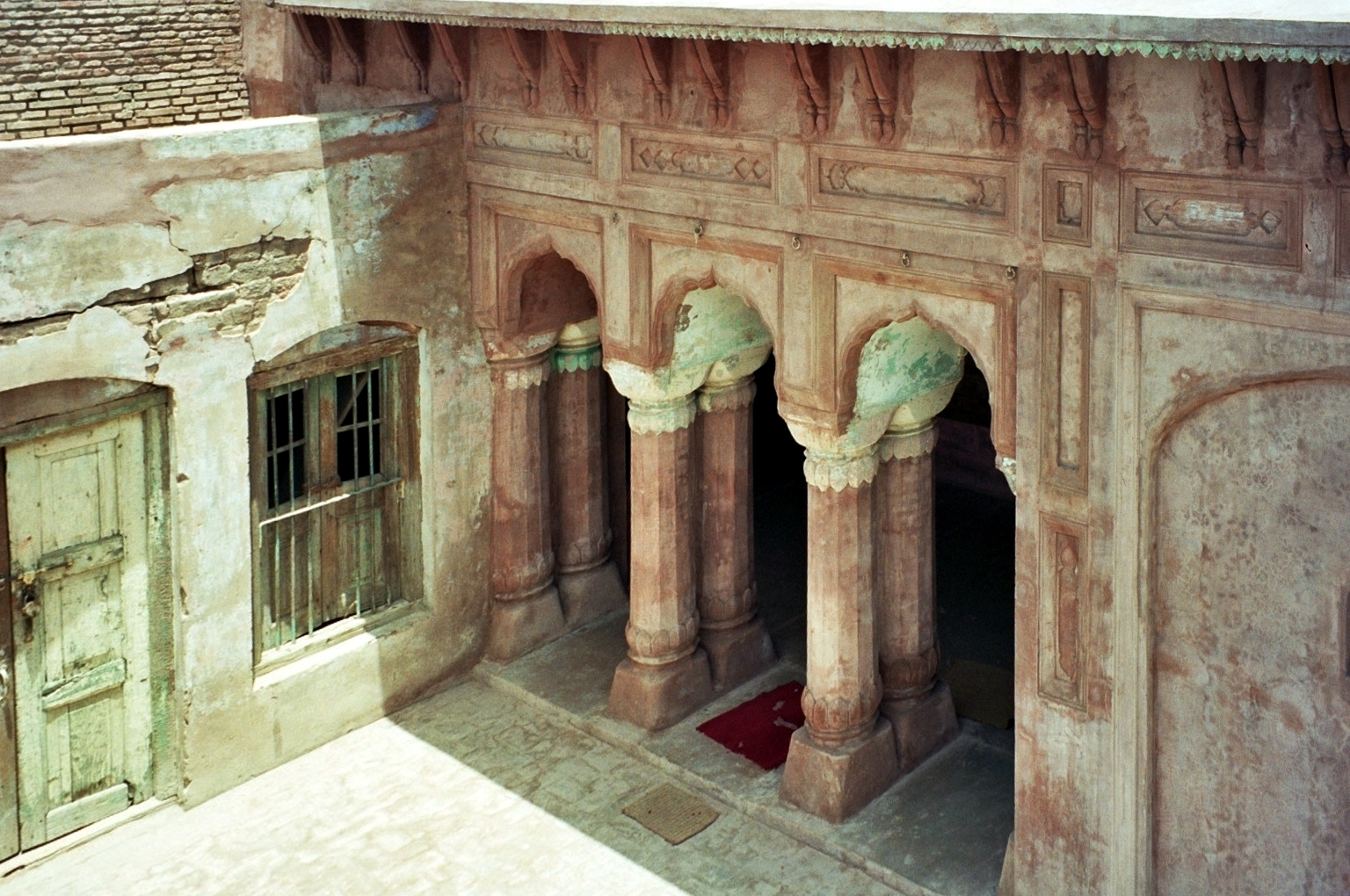
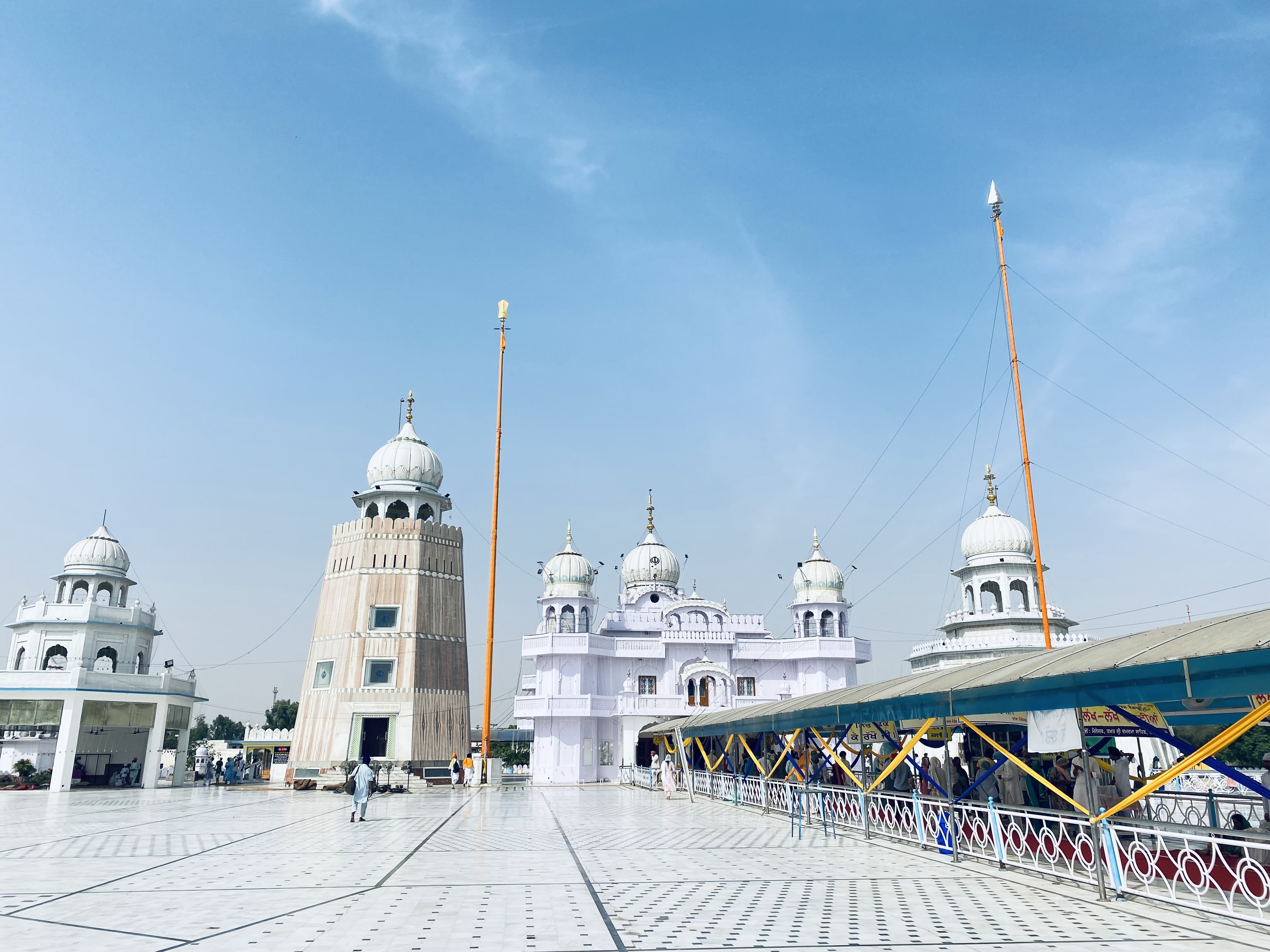
- Gobindgarh (Qila Mubarak) in Bathinda, Takht Sri Damdama Sahib

- Location in Punjab
- Coordinates: 30°12′36″N 74°56′24″E
- Country: India
- State: Punjab
- District: Bathinda
- Region of Punjab: Malwa

Area
  - Total: 3,385 km^{2} (1,307 sq mi)

Population (2011)
  - Total: 1,388,525
  - Density: 410.2/km^{2} (1,062/sq mi)

Languages
  - Official: Punjabi
- Time zone: UTC+5:30 (IST)
- Telephone code: 0164
- Website: bathinda.nic.in

Bathinda district is in Malwa region of Punjab, India. The district encompasses an area of 3,385 square kilometers. By area, Bathinda district is the second-largest in Punjab, after Ludhiana district. It is bounded by Faridkot district and Moga district on the north, Muktsar district on the west, Barnala and Mansa districts on the east, and the state of Haryana on the south. Bathinda is cotton producing belt of Punjab. The district is part of the Faridkot division.

== History ==
Raja Deb and Raja Vena Pal are purported to have been local rulers of the region, being tied to the fort of Bathinda.

The district of Bathinda came into existence with the formation of the PEPSU in 1948. It had its headquarters at Faridkot, which were shifted to Bathinda in 1953.

In 1953, Bathinda district was expanded to include the Phul sub-tehsil of Barnala district. In 1956, along with the merger of PEPSU, Bathinda was integrated into the state of Punjab.

Later, Faridkot district was carved out of Bathinda on August 7, 1972, by separating Faridkot tehsil from Bathinda district, along with Moga and Muktsar tehsils from Firozpur district. Subsequently, on April 13, 1992, Mansa district was created by carving out the southeastern part of Bathinda district.

During the British era, most of present-day Bathinda district was part of Patiala State, with Bathinda functioning as a tehsil under its Barnala (Anahgarh) district. Some parts of the present district were also under other princely states—Nabha State (Phul etc.), Jind State (Balanwali, Dyalpura Mirza etc.), and Faridkot State (bhagta, Goniana etc.). Additionally, the Mehraj/Nathana area was part of Moga tehsil in Ferozepur district until 1959, when it was transferred to Bathinda district.

== Demography ==
Religion in Bathinda district (2011)
1. Sikhs (70.9%)
2. Hindus (27.4%)
3. Muslims (1.17%)
4. Other (0.53%)
Languages of Bathinda district (First Language) (2011)
1. Punjabi (89.6%)
2. Hindi (8.61%)
3. Other (1.83%)

Historical population
Year	Pop.	±% p.a.
1951	377,757	—
1961	509,031	+3.03%
1971	623,172	+2.04%
1981	817,764	+2.75%
1991	985,301	+1.88%
2001	1,183,295	+1.85%
2011	1,388,525	+1.61%

According to the 2011 census Bathinda district has a population of 1,388,525, roughly equal to the nation of Eswatini or the US state of Hawaii. This gives it a ranking of 352nd in India (out of a total of 640). The district has a population density of 414 inhabitants per square kilometre (1,070/sq mi) . Its population growth rate over the decade 2001–2011 was 17.37%. Bathinda has a sex ratio of 865 females for every 1000 males, and a literacy rate of 69.6%. Scheduled Castes made up 32.44% of the population.

At the time of the 2011 census, 89.56% of the population spoke Punjabi and 8.61% Hindi as their first language.

Religion in Bathinda district (2011)
Religion	Percent
Sikhism	55.66%
Hinduism	41.23%
Islam	1.25%
Buddhism	0.82%
Christianity	0.66%
Other or not stated	0.38%

Religion in tehsils of Bathinda district (2011)
Tehsil	Sikhism (%)	Hinduism (%)	Islam (%)	Others (%)
Bathinda	63.12	35.12	1.07	0.69
Talwandi Sabo	78.04	20.38	1.23	0.35
Phul	82.30	16.00	1.37	0.32

== Economy ==
In 2010–11, there were a total of 4,261 registered industrial units in Bathinda district. Of this, 12 were large and medium units. Small scale industries employed 22,744 workers and Large and Medium industries employed 6,865 people.

== Health ==
The table below shows the data from the district nutrition profile of children below the age of 5 years, in Bathinda, as of year 2020.

District nutrition profile of children under 5 years of age in Taran Taran, year 2020
Indicators	Number of children (<5 years)	Percent (2020)	Percent (2016)
Stunted	24,114	23%	25%
Wasted	16,184	15%	10%
Severely wasted	4,982	5%	4%
Underweight	24,911	24%	17%
Overweight/obesity	1,290	1%	2%
Anemia	65,550	70%	45%
Total children	104,888		

The table below shows the district nutrition profile of Bathinda of women between the ages of 15 and 49 years, as of year 2020.

District nutritional profile of Bathinda of women of 15–49 years, in 2020
Indicators	Number of women (15–49 years)	Percent (2020)	Percent (2016)
Underweight (BMI <18.5 kg/m^2)	72,366	17%	12%
Overweight/obesity	164,038	37%	24%
Hypertension	141,098	32%	15%
Diabetes	61,202	14%	NA
Anemia (non-preg)	261,533	46|%	
Anemia (preg)	NA	NA	32%
Total women (preg)	20,789		
Total women	437,786		

The table below shows the current use of family planning methods by currently married women between the ages of 15 and 49 years, in Bathinda district.

Family planning methods used by women between the ages of 15 and 49 years, in Bathinda district
Method	Total (2019–21)	Total (2015–16)	Urban (2015–16)	Rural (2015–16)
Female sterilization	17.5%	43.2%	37.6%	47.7 %
Male sterilization	0.8%	0.9%	0.4%	1.3%
IUD/PPIUD	6.2%	10.5%	12.1%	9.2%
Pill	2.5%	2.4%	2.4%	2.3%
Condom	13.2%	20.4%	22.3%	18.9%
Injectables	0.1%	0.0%	NA	NA
Any modern method	40.7%	77.3%	74.7%	79.3%
Any method	45.3%	82.6%	81.4%	83.6%
Total unmet need	17.7%	3.8%	3.9%	3.6%
Unmet need for spacing	4.9%	1.5%	1.5%	1.6%

The table below shows the number of road accidents and people affected in Bathinda district by year.

Road accidents and people affected in Bathinda district by year
Year	Accidents	Killed	Injured	Vehicles Involved
2022	350	265	199	551
2021	287	213	161	447
2020	284	229	187	358
2019	324	261	182	279

== Administration ==
Bathinda

Climate chart (precipitation, max. and min. temperature)
J	F	M	A	M	J	J	A	S	O	N	D
10 20 7	19 24 10	7.9 30 15	9.8 37 21	20 41 26	38 41 28	90 37 28	84 36 27	52 36 25	9.4 34 19	1.4 29 13	3.6 23 8
- █ Average max. and min. temperatures in °C
- █ Precipitation totals in mm
- Source: MSN World Weather
Imperial conversion
J	F	M	A	M	J	J	A	S	O	N	D
0.4 68 45	0.8 75 50	0.3 86 59	0.4 99 70	0.8 106 79	1.5 106 82	3.6 99 82	3.3 97 81	2 97 77	0.4 93 66	0.1 84 55	0.1 73 46
- █ Average max. and min. temperatures in °F
- █ Precipitation totals in inches

Bathinda is divided into the 4 tehsils of Bathinda, Rampura Phul, Maur and Talwandi Sabo. These tehsils are further divided into the nine blocks of Bathinda, Sangat, Nathana, Rampura, Phul, Maur, Balianwali, Bhagta Bhai ka and Talwandi Sabo.

Administrative Structure
No of Blocks	No of Villages	No of Census town	No of M.Corporation	No of M. Councils
9 (Bathinda, Sangat, Nathana, Rampura, Phul, Maur, Balianwali, Bhagta Bhaika and Talwandisabo)	272	2 (Bhisiana, Mehna)	1 (Bathinda)	20 (Sangat, Raman Mandi, Maur, Kotfatta, Rampura, Bhuchomandi, Goniana, Talwandi sabo, Bhagta, Kotshamir, Lehra Mohabbat, Nathana, Chauke, Rampura, Balianwali, Mandi Kalan, Maluka, Kothaguru, Bhairupa, Mehraj )

=== Subdistricts of Bathinda district ===
According to the Indian government's integrated online directory, Bathinda district is divided into the following subdistricts (tehsils/subdivisions) and blocks:

- Subdistricts
  1. Bathinda
  2. Maur
  3. Rampura Phul
  4. Talwandi Sabo
- Blocks:
  1. Bathinda
  2. Bhagta Bhaika
  3. Goniana
  4. Maur
  5. Nathana
  6. Phul
  7. Rampura
  8. Sangat
  9. Talwandi Sabo

== List of Deputy Commissioners ==
Name	Assumed office	Left office
Sh. Sodhi Surjeet Singh, PCS	20-03-1954	01-07-1954
Sh. Munshi Ram, PCS	01-07-1954	04-07-1957
Sh. M.D. Ahuja, PCS	04-07-1957	09-01-1958
Sh. Sher Jasjeet Singh, PCS	09-01-1958	26-05-1959
Sh. Bhai Sher Jang Singh, IAS	17-06-1959	19-11-1962
Sh. K.D. Vasudev, IAS	19-11-1962	02-09-1966
Sh. R.C. Kapila, IAS	13-09-1966	18-04-1968
Sh. Joginder Singh, IAS	19-04-1968	01-05-1969
Sh. Sukhbir Singh, IAS	16-09-1969	07-06-1971
Sh. Gurdev Singh Gill, PCS	11-06-1971	27-08-1971
Sh. A.C. Saini, IAS	27-08-1971	30-06-1972
Sh. R.R. Bhardvaj, IAS	30-06-1972	03-10-1975
Sh. N.K. Arora, IAS	03-10-1975	27-07-1977
Sh. Vikramjeet Singh, IAS	27-07-1977	25-01-1980
Sh. S.K. Tuteja, IAS	12-03-1980	12-03-1980
Sh. K. Rajindren Nair, IAS	12-03-1980	22-08-1980
Sh. Jai Singh Gill, IAS	03-09-1980	20-03-1983
Sh. A.K. Mishra, IAS	20-03-1983	27-04-1986
Sh. J.S. Komi, IAS	27-04-1986	25-04-1988
Sh. D.S. Guru, IAS	25-04-1988	12-05-1992
Sh. R.K. Nayar, IAS	12-05-1992	26-08-1993
Sh. Arun Goyal, IAS	26-08-1993	14-06-1994
Sh. Amarjeet Singh, IAS	14-06-1994	14-07-1995
Sh. Sukhpal Singh Gill, IAS	14-07-1995	23-04-1998
Sh. S.R. Ladhar, IAS	23-04-1998	16-12-1999
Sh. Jaspal Singh, IAS	16-12-1999	07-06-2001
Sh. R.Venctortanam, IAS	07-06-2001	04-03-2002
Sh. Anurag verma, IAS	04-03-2002	19-05-2003
Sh. Anurag Aggarwal, IAS	23-05-2003	27-11-2003
Sh. K.A.P. Sinha, IAS	27-11-2003	12-05-2005
Sh. Rahul Bhandari, IAS	12-05-2005	19-07-2007
Sh. Rahul Tiwari, IAS	19-07-2007	14-06-2008
Sh. Vinjay N Jada, IAS	14-06-2008	11-08-2008
Sh. Rahul Tiwari, IAS	11-08-2008	28-02-2010
Sh. Gurkirat Kirpal Singh, IAS	02-03-2010	05-01-2011
Dr. S. Karuna Raju, IAS	06-01-2011	28-07-2011
Sh. Kamal Kishore Yadav, IAS	28-07-2011	02-06-2014
Sh. Basant Garg, IAS	02-06-2014	14-11-2016
Sh. Ghansham Thori, IAS	15-11-2016	17-03-2017
Sh. Diprava Lakra, IAS	17-03-2017	17-07-2018
Sh. Praneet, IAS	18-07-2018	08-04-2019
Sh. B. SRINIVASAN, IAS	09-04-2019	04-10-2021
Sh. Arvind Pal Singh Sandhu, IAS	05-10-2021	19-01-2022
Sh. Vineet Kumar, IAS	19-01-2022	01-04-2022
Sh. Showkat Ahmad Parray, IAS	02-04-2022	in office

== Politics ==
No.	Constituency	Name of MLA	Party	Bench
90	Rampura Phul	Balkar Singh Sidhu	Aam Aadmi Party	Government
91	Bhucho Mandi (SC)	Master Jagsir Singh	Aam Aadmi Party	Government
92	Bathinda Urban	Jagroop Singh Gill	Aam Aadmi Party	Government
93	Bathinda Rural (SC)	Amit Rattan Kotfatta	Aam Aadmi Party	Government
94	Talwandi Sabo	Baljinder Kaur	Aam Aadmi Party	Government
95	Maur	Sukhvir Maiser Khana	Aam Aadmi Party	Government

== Notable people ==
- Parduman Singh Brar, athlete
- Ravinder Singh Khaira, athlete
- Kuldeep Manak, singer
- Jazim Sharma, singer
- Gurpreet Singh, painting artist
